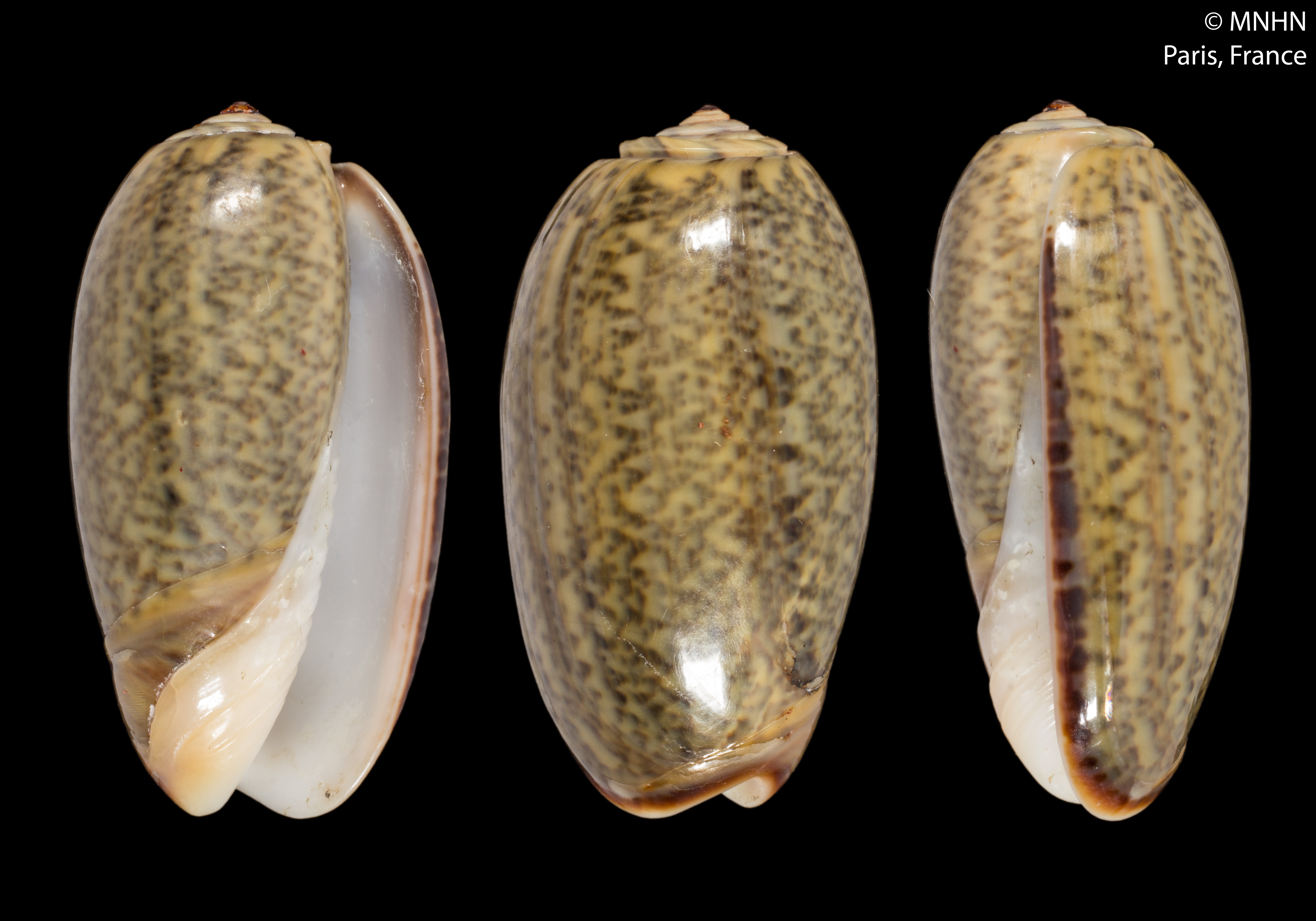
- Shell of Oliva lecoquiana (syntype at MNHN, Paris)

Scientific classification
- Kingdom: Animalia
- Phylum: Mollusca
- Class: Gastropoda
- Subclass: Caenogastropoda
- Order: Neogastropoda
- Family: Olividae
- Genus: Oliva
- Species: O. lecoquiana

Binomial name
- Oliva lecoquiana Ducros de Saint Germain, 1857

= Oliva lecoquiana =

Species of gastropod

Oliva lecoquiana is a species of sea snail, a marine gastropod mollusk in the family Olividae, the olives.
