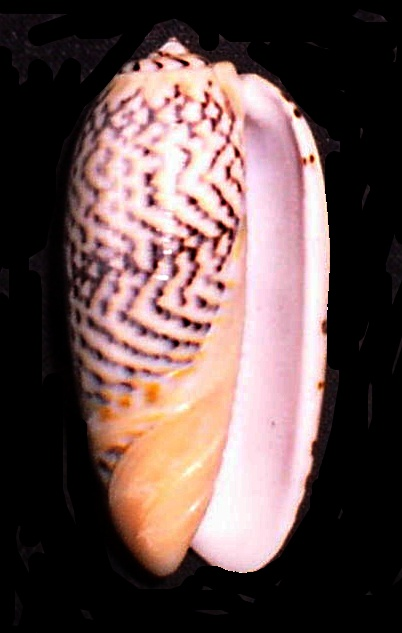

Scientific classification
- Kingdom: Animalia
- Phylum: Mollusca
- Class: Gastropoda
- Subclass: Caenogastropoda
- Order: Neogastropoda
- Family: Olividae
- Genus: Oliva
- Species: O. reticulata

Binomial name
- Oliva reticulata (Röding, 1798)

Synonyms
- Oliva evania Duclos, 1840; Oliva sanguinolenta Lamarck, 1810; Oliva (Viduoliva) reticulata (Röding, 1798)

= Oliva reticulata =

Species of gastropod

Oliva reticulata, common name the blood olive, is a species of sea snail, a marine gastropod mollusk in the family Olividae, the olive snails.

== Description ==
The length of the shell varies between 32 mm and 50 mm. The shell of the snail forms as a deep orange columella with a black pattern on the body whorl. The aperture of the shell is a brighter pale white.

== Distribution ==
This species occurs in the Indian Ocean off Madagascar and in the Pacific Ocean off New Caledonia.
