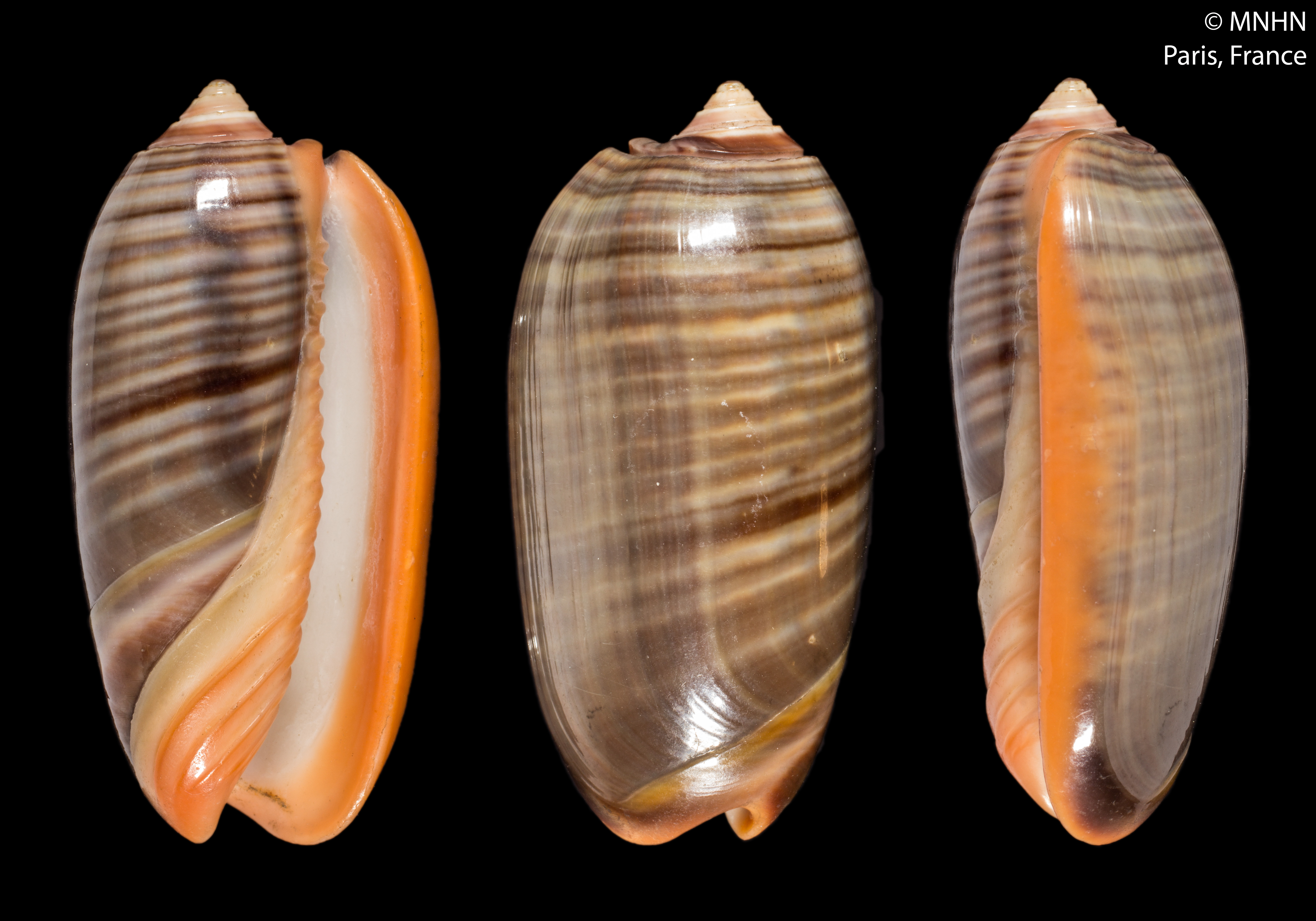
- Shell of Oliva rubrolabiata (holotype at MNHN, Paris)

Scientific classification
- Kingdom: Animalia
- Phylum: Mollusca
- Class: Gastropoda
- Subclass: Caenogastropoda
- Order: Neogastropoda
- Family: Olividae
- Genus: Oliva
- Species: O. rubrolabiata

Binomial name
- Oliva rubrolabiata Fischer, 1903

= Oliva rubrolabiata =

Species of gastropod

Oliva rubrolabiata, commonly named the red-lip olive, is a species of sea snail, a marine gastropod mollusk in the family Olividae, the olives.

== Description ==
The size of the shell varies between 35 mm and 47 mm.

== Distribution ==
This marine species occurs off the New Hebrides, Vanuatu, and New Caledonia.
