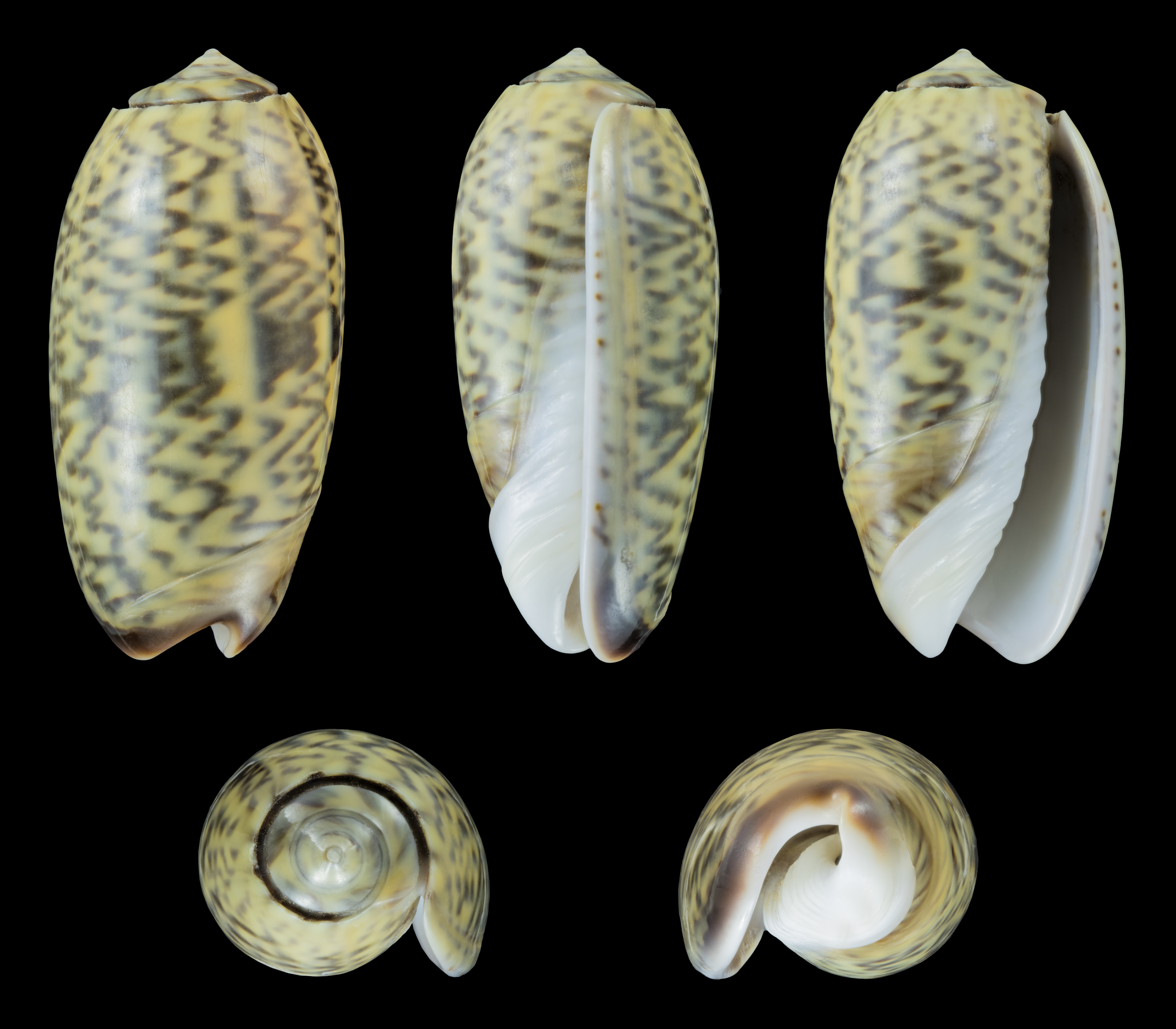

Scientific classification
- Kingdom: Animalia
- Phylum: Mollusca
- Class: Gastropoda
- Subclass: Caenogastropoda
- Order: Neogastropoda
- Family: Olividae
- Genus: Oliva
- Species: O. keenii

Binomial name
- Oliva keenii Marrat, 1870

Synonyms
- Oliva leucostoma Duclos, 1840 (invalid: junior homonym of Oliva leucostoma Lamarck, 1811)

= Oliva keenii =

Species of gastropod

Oliva keenii is a species of sea snail, a marine gastropod mollusk in the family Olividae, the olives.

== Distribution ==
Pacific Ocean: Philippines.
