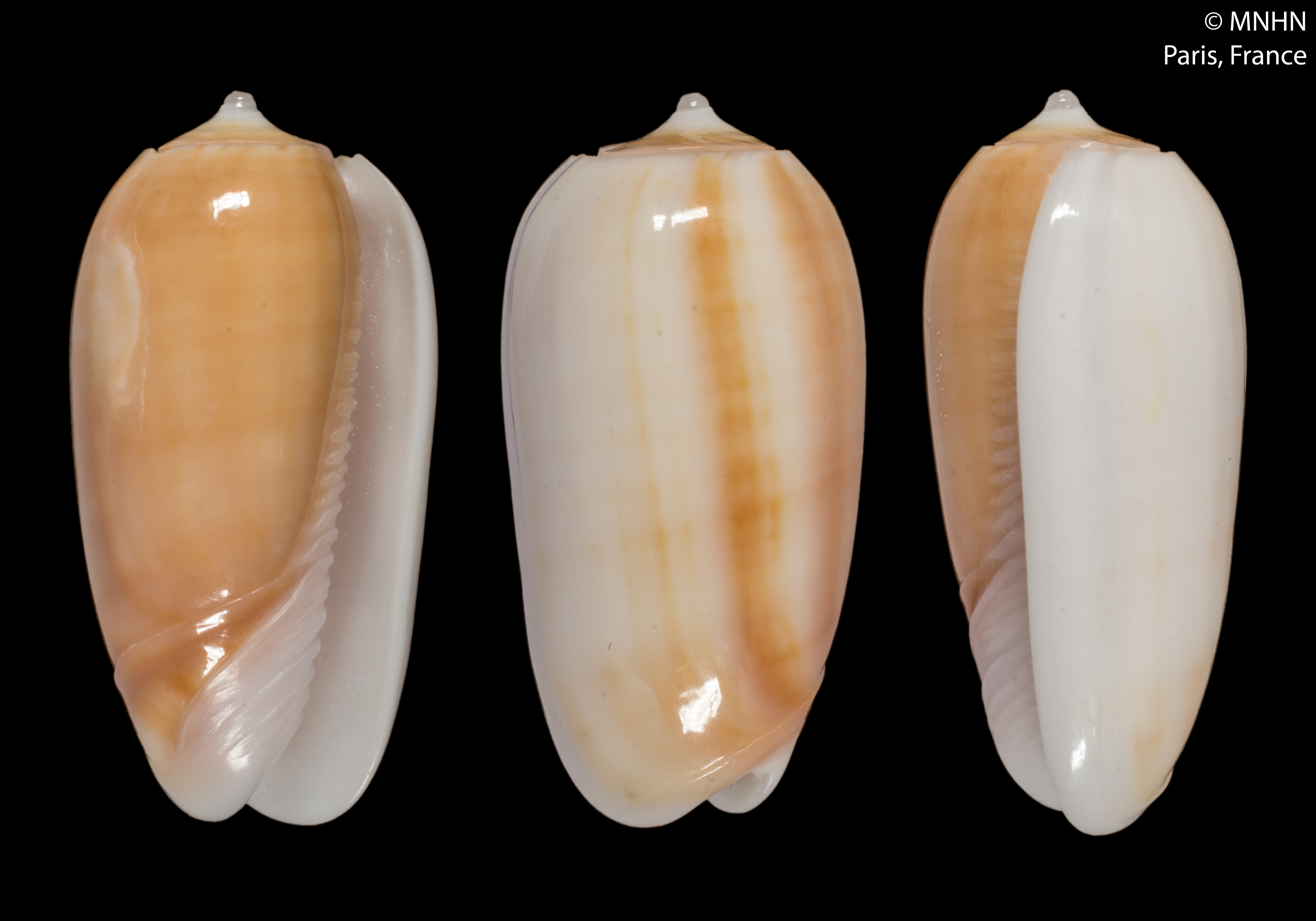
- Shell of Oliva athenia (paralectotype at MNHN, Paris)

Scientific classification
- Kingdom: Animalia
- Phylum: Mollusca
- Class: Gastropoda
- Subclass: Caenogastropoda
- Order: Neogastropoda
- Family: Olividae
- Genus: Oliva
- Species: O. athenia

Binomial name
- Oliva athenia Duclos, 1840

= Oliva athenia =

Species of gastropod

Oliva athenia is a species of sea snail, a marine gastropod mollusk in the family Olividae, the olives.It was first described by Pierre-Louis Duclos in 1840 and is currently recognized in the World Register of Marine Species as a valid species.Like other members of the family Olividae, it is characterized by a smooth, glossy, elongated shell and a burrowing predatory lifestyle in sandy marine habitats.

== Distribution ==
This species occurs in the China seas.
