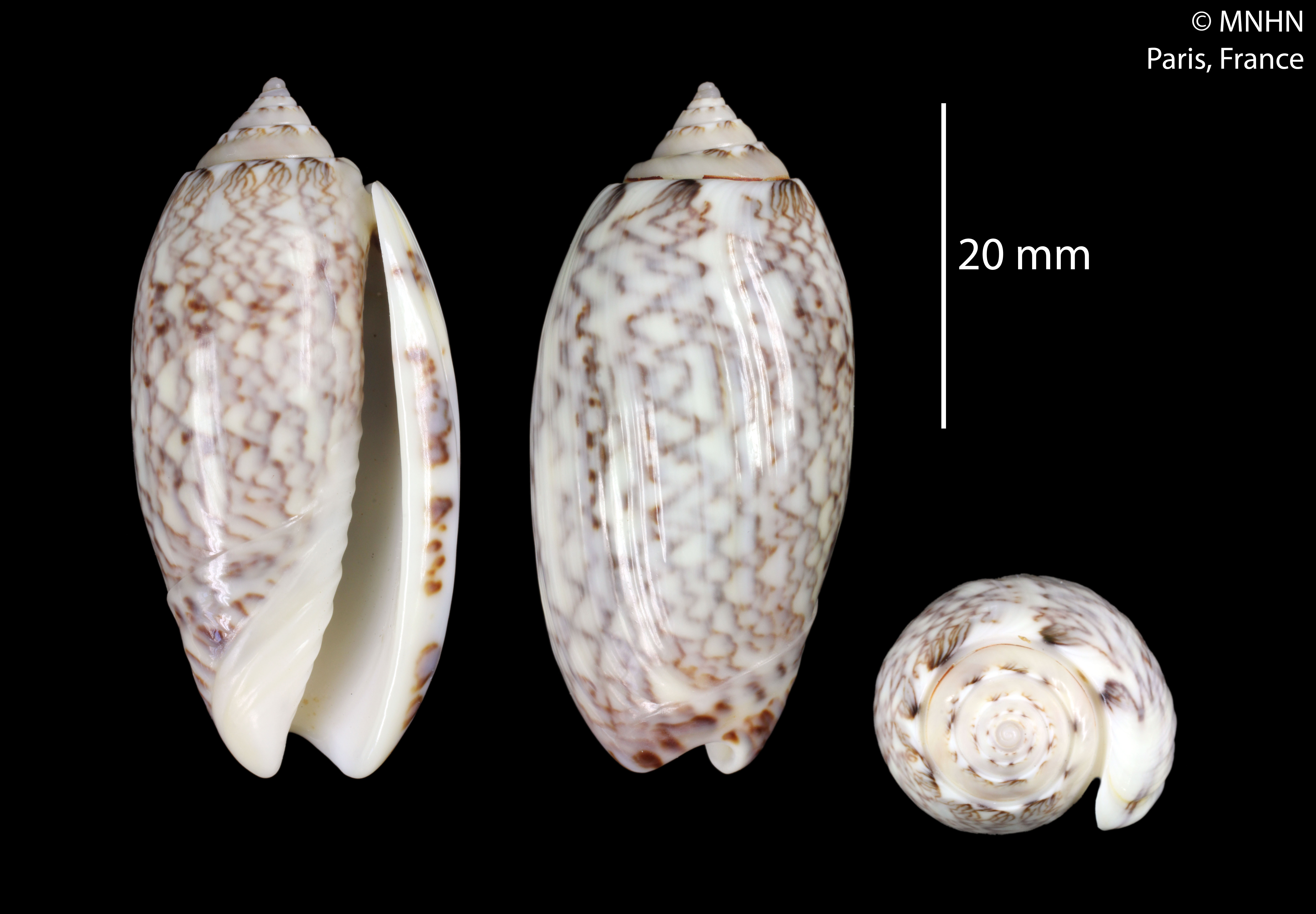
- Shell of Oliva tisiphona (specimen at MNHN, Paris)

Scientific classification
- Kingdom: Animalia
- Phylum: Mollusca
- Class: Gastropoda
- Subclass: Caenogastropoda
- Order: Neogastropoda
- Family: Olividae
- Genus: Oliva
- Species: O. tisiphona

Binomial name
- Oliva tisiphona Duclos, 1845

= Oliva tisiphona =

Species of gastropod

Oliva tisiphona is a species of sea snail, a marine gastropod mollusk in the family Olividae, the olives.

This is a nomen dubium.

== Distribution ==
This marine species occurs off Martinique.
