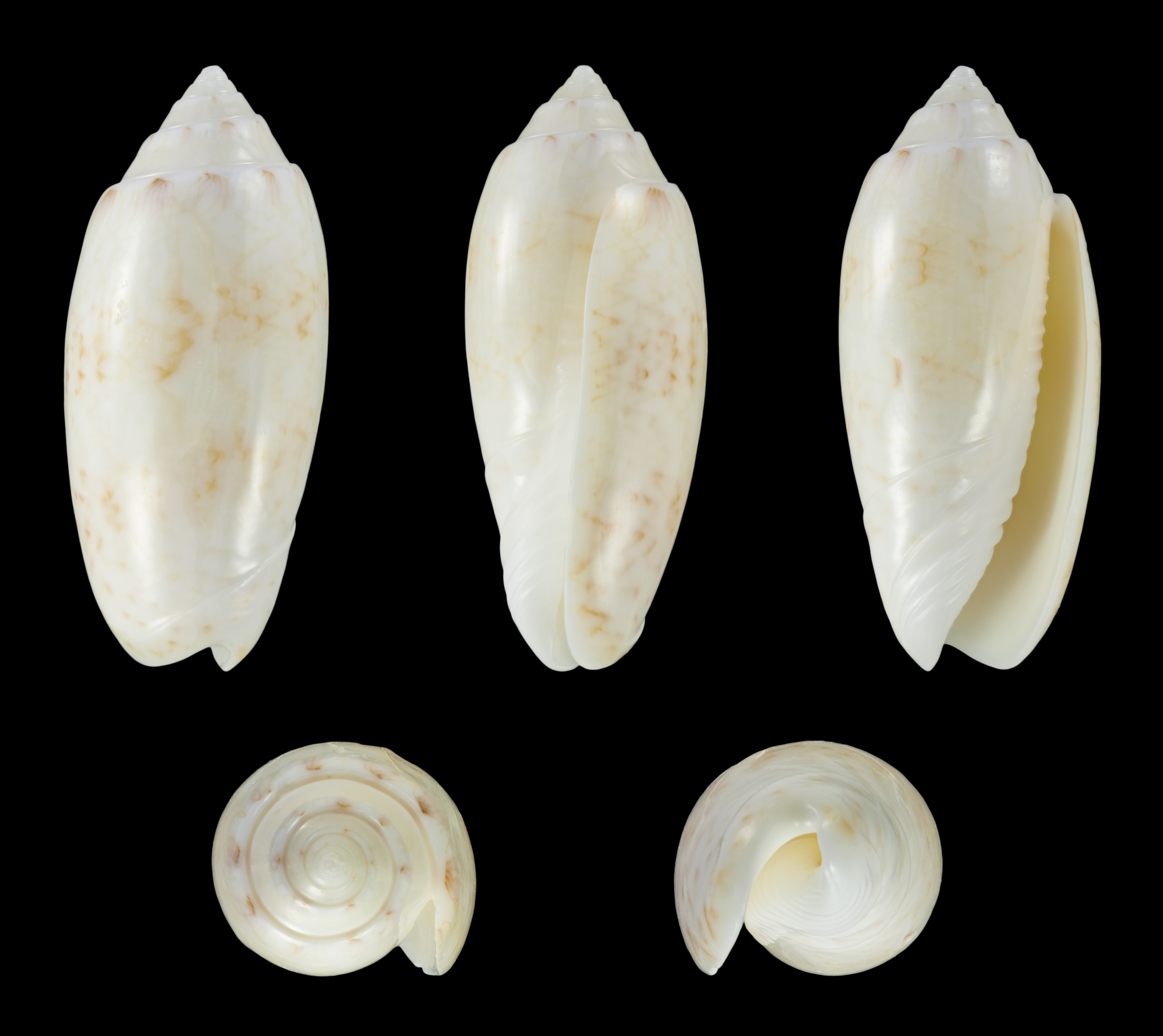

Scientific classification
- Kingdom: Animalia
- Phylum: Mollusca
- Class: Gastropoda
- Subclass: Caenogastropoda
- Order: Neogastropoda
- Family: Olividae
- Genus: Oliva
- Species: O. fulgurator

Binomial name
- Oliva fulgurator (Röding, 1798)

Synonyms
- Oliva aldinia Duclos, 1844; Oliva bullata Marrat, 1871; Oliva fusiformis Lamarck, 1811; Oliva mercatoria Marrat, 1871; Porphyria fulgurator Röding, 1798 (original combination)

= Oliva fulgurator =

Species of gastropod

Oliva fulgurator is a species of sea snail, an olive snail, a marine gastropod mollusk in the family Olividae, the olives.

Subspecies

- Oliva fulgurator bullata Marrat, 1871
- Oliva fulgurator fulgurator (Röding, 1798)

== Distribution ==
This marine species occurs in the Caribbean Sea and off the Lesser Antilles.
