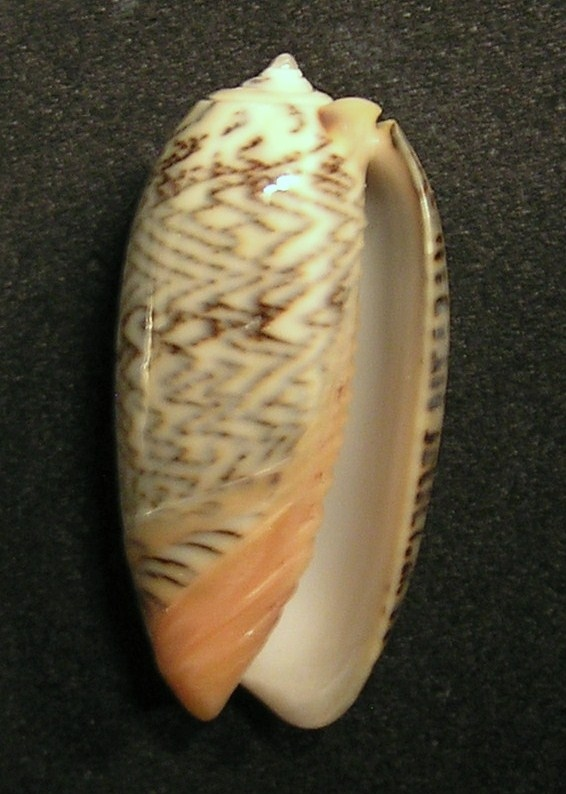
- Apertural view of a shell of Oliva elegans zigzag

Scientific classification
- Kingdom: Animalia
- Phylum: Mollusca
- Class: Gastropoda
- Subclass: Caenogastropoda
- Order: Neogastropoda
- Family: Olividae
- Genus: Oliva
- Species: O. elegans

Binomial name
- Oliva elegans Lamarck, 1811

Synonyms
- Oliva (Viduoliva) elegans Lamarck, 1811

= Oliva elegans =

Species of gastropod

Oliva elegans is a species of sea snail, a marine gastropod mollusk in the family Olividae, the olives.

== Description ==
The length of the shell varies between 30 mm and 53 mm.

== Distribution ==
Oliva elegans occurs in the Red Sea, in the Indian Ocean off Mozambique and in the Western Pacific Ocean.
