= Oliva vicweei =

Scientific classification
- Kingdom: Animalia
- Phylum: Mollusca
- Class: Gastropoda
- Subclass: Caenogastropoda
- Order: Neogastropoda
- Family: Olividae
- Genus: Oliva
- Species: O. vicweei

Binomial name
- Oliva vicweei Recourt, 1989

Species of gastropod

Oliva vicweei is a species of sea snail, a marine gastropod mollusk in the family Olividae, the olives.

== Description ==
Original description: "Shell medium sized for genus. Cylindrical, 15-17 plicae which are explicit present. Spire blunted in adults and more elongated in subadult specimens. Spire whorls are completely covered with thickened purplish to brownish callus. The coloration of the callus is shown radially from apex to suture. The ground color of the body-whorl is cream to yellowish. The shell has two, more or less shown, bands. One around the middle of the body-whorl, the other a little below the suture. Oliva vicweei n.sp. is clouded by brownish spots and yellow triangles and very dark spots are scattered around the body-whorl. Just below the suture a necklace of dark brown to black spots is present.
Aperture lavender to brownish within. The suprafasciolarian band is provided with numerous, irregular, reddish brown lines." The holotype measures 29.8 x 13.3 mm. and is deposited in the ZMA (ZMA moll. 3.89.017).

== Distribution ==
Locus typicus: "The holotype and two paratypes
originate from Madura, North West of Java, Indonesia."

== Habitat ==
"Type material was discovered in small pockets of yellow sand,
at a depth of 1.5 to 2.5 metres, inside a reef."
