= Oliva lacanientai =

- Shell of Oliva lacanientai (specimen at the Natural History Museum, Rotterdam)

Scientific classification
- Kingdom: Animalia
- Phylum: Mollusca
- Class: Gastropoda
- Subclass: Caenogastropoda
- Order: Neogastropoda
- Family: Olividae
- Genus: Oliva
- Species: O. lacanientai

Binomial name
- Oliva lacanientai Greifeneder & Blöcher, 1985

Species of gastropod

Oliva lacanientai is a species of sea snail, a marine gastropod mollusk in the family Olividae, commonly known as the olives.

== Description ==
The shell of Oliva lacanientai is smooth, glossy, and elongated, typical of members of the family Olividae. The length of the shell varies between 9 mm and 26.5 mm. The spire is relatively low, with a well-defined suture, and the aperture is long and narrow, extending nearly the full length of the shell.

Shell coloration and patterning vary among individuals but generally include muted tones with subtle banding or mottling, consistent with camouflage in sandy marine environments. As with other species in the genus Oliva, the surface of the shell lacks strong sculpture and is highly polished due to the action of the mantle, which often partially covers the shell during life.

== Habitat and ecology ==
Oliva lacanientai is a marine species that inhabits sandy substrates in shallow to moderately deep waters. Like other olive snails, it is likely to be a burrowing species, spending much of its time beneath the sand surface. Members of the family Olividae are carnivorous and typically prey on small invertebrates, using a well-developed foot for rapid movement and burrowing.

== Distribution ==
This marine species occurs in the western Pacific region. It has been recorded from waters off the Philippines, the Eastern China Sea, and off New Caledonia.

== Taxonomy ==
The species was first described in 1985 by Greifeneder and Blöcher. It belongs to the genus Oliva, which comprises numerous species distributed primarily in tropical and subtropical marine environments. The specific epithet lacanientai was assigned by the original authors and has remained valid since its description.
