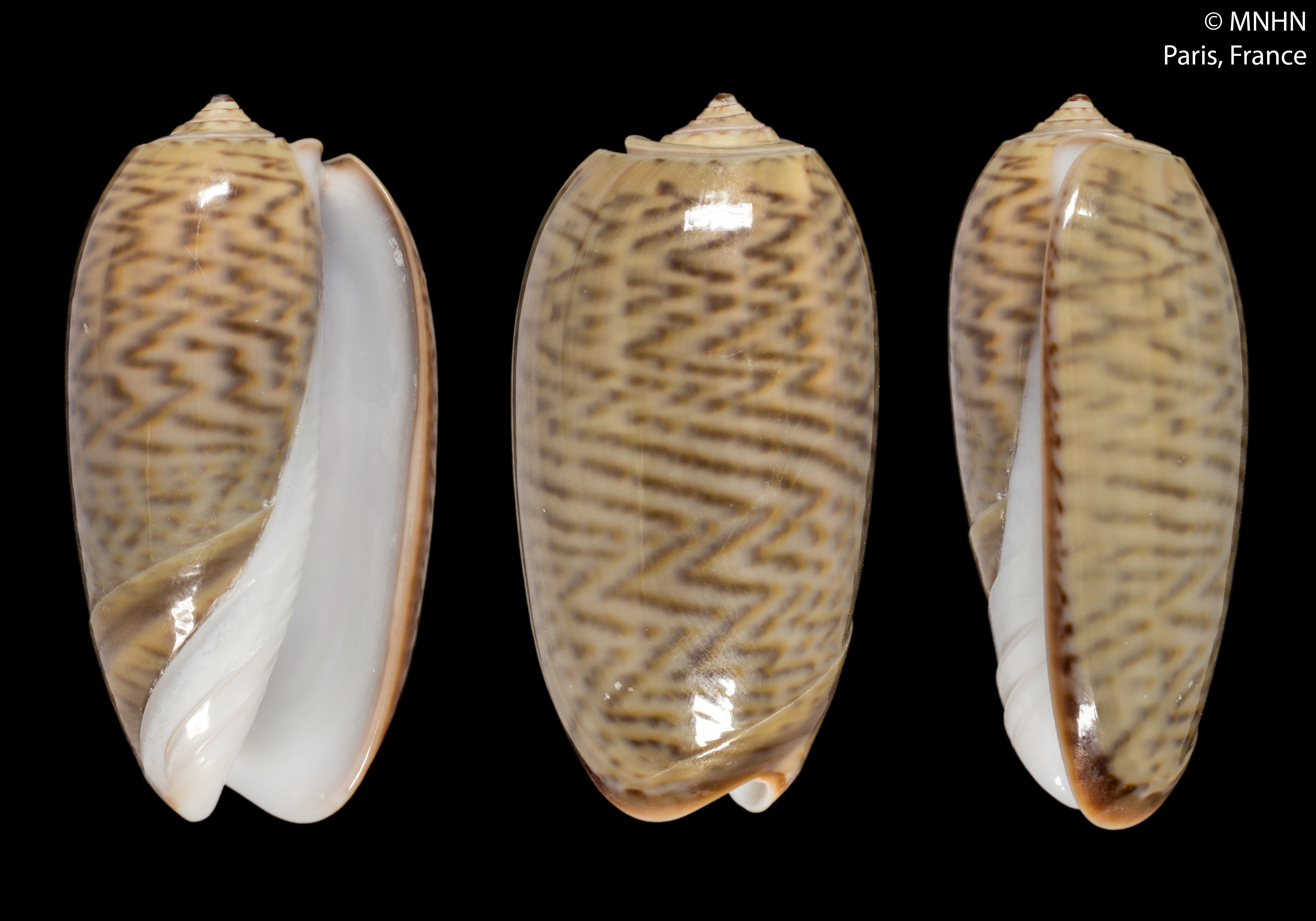
- Shell of Oliva neostina (syntype at MNHN, Paris)

Scientific classification
- Kingdom: Animalia
- Phylum: Mollusca
- Class: Gastropoda
- Subclass: Caenogastropoda
- Order: Neogastropoda
- Family: Olividae
- Genus: Oliva
- Species: O. neostina

Binomial name
- Oliva neostina Duclos, 1840

Synonyms
- Oliva neoslina (incorrect original spelling)

= Oliva neostina =

Species of gastropod

Oliva neostina is a species of sea snail in the olive family, Olividae.

== Distribution ==
This marine species occurs from the Bay of Bengal to Fiji|.
