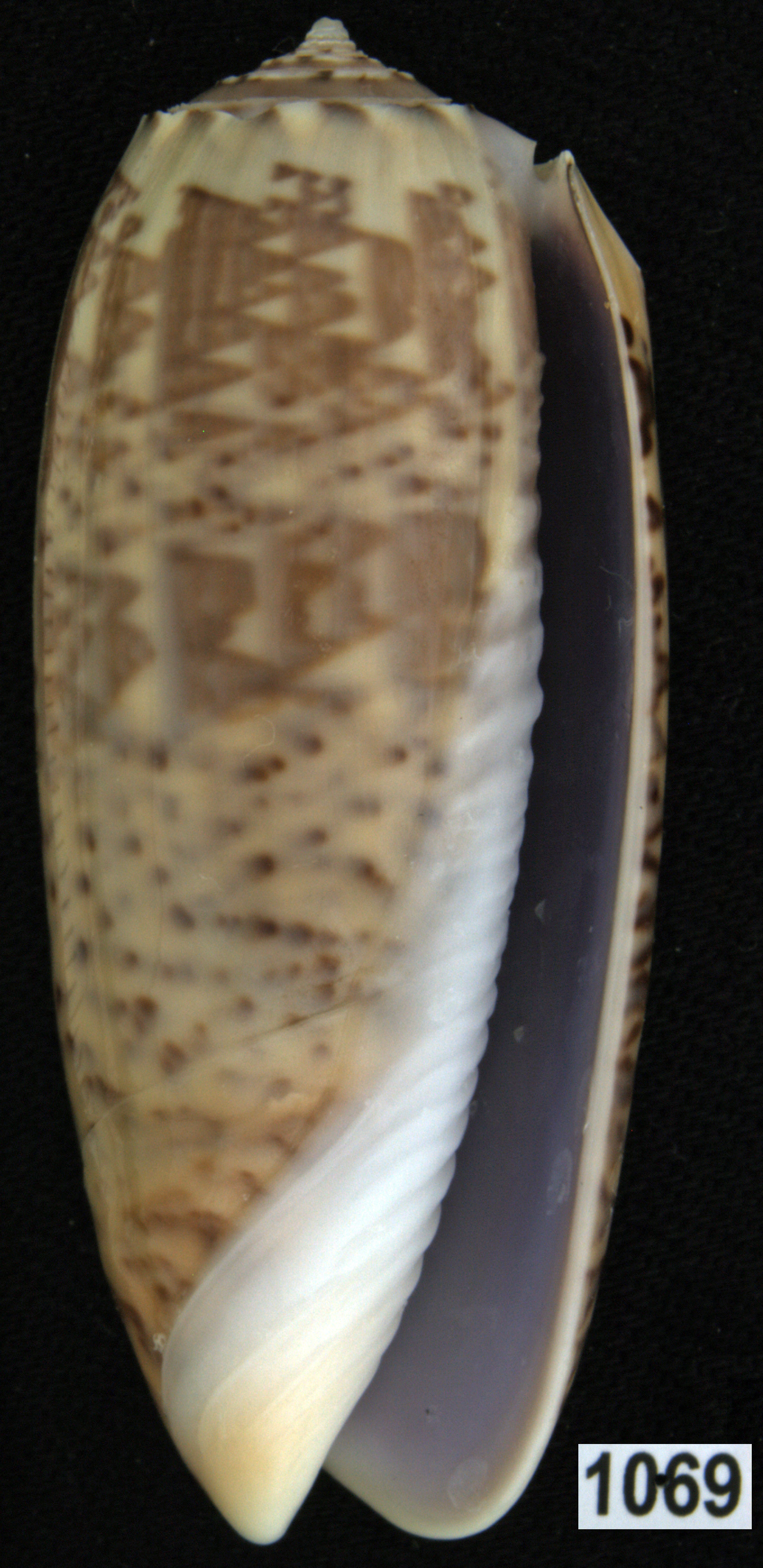

Scientific classification
- Kingdom: Animalia
- Phylum: Mollusca
- Class: Gastropoda
- Subclass: Caenogastropoda
- Order: Neogastropoda
- Family: Olividae
- Genus: Oliva
- Species: O. pacifica

Binomial name
- Oliva pacifica Marrat, 1870

Synonyms
- Oliva arctata Marrat, 1870; Oliva zeigleri da Motta, 1981

= Oliva pacifica =

Species of gastropod

Oliva pacifica is a species of sea snail, a marine gastropod mollusk in the olive family Olividae.

== Description ==
Its shell is long and roughly cylindrical in shape and is 30–63 mm long, with a narrow slit running along the length of it.

== Distribution ==
Oliva pacifica is mainly found in western Thailand.
