= Oliva ouini =

Scientific classification
- Kingdom: Animalia
- Phylum: Mollusca
- Class: Gastropoda
- Subclass: Caenogastropoda
- Order: Neogastropoda
- Family: Olividae
- Genus: Oliva
- Species: O. ouini

Binomial name
- Oliva ouini Kantor & Tursch, 1998

Species of gastropod

Oliva ouini is a species of sea snail, a marine gastropod mollusk in the family Olividae, the olives.

== Description ==
Shell size 15-20 mm.

== Distribution ==
Pacific Ocean: Vanuatu.
