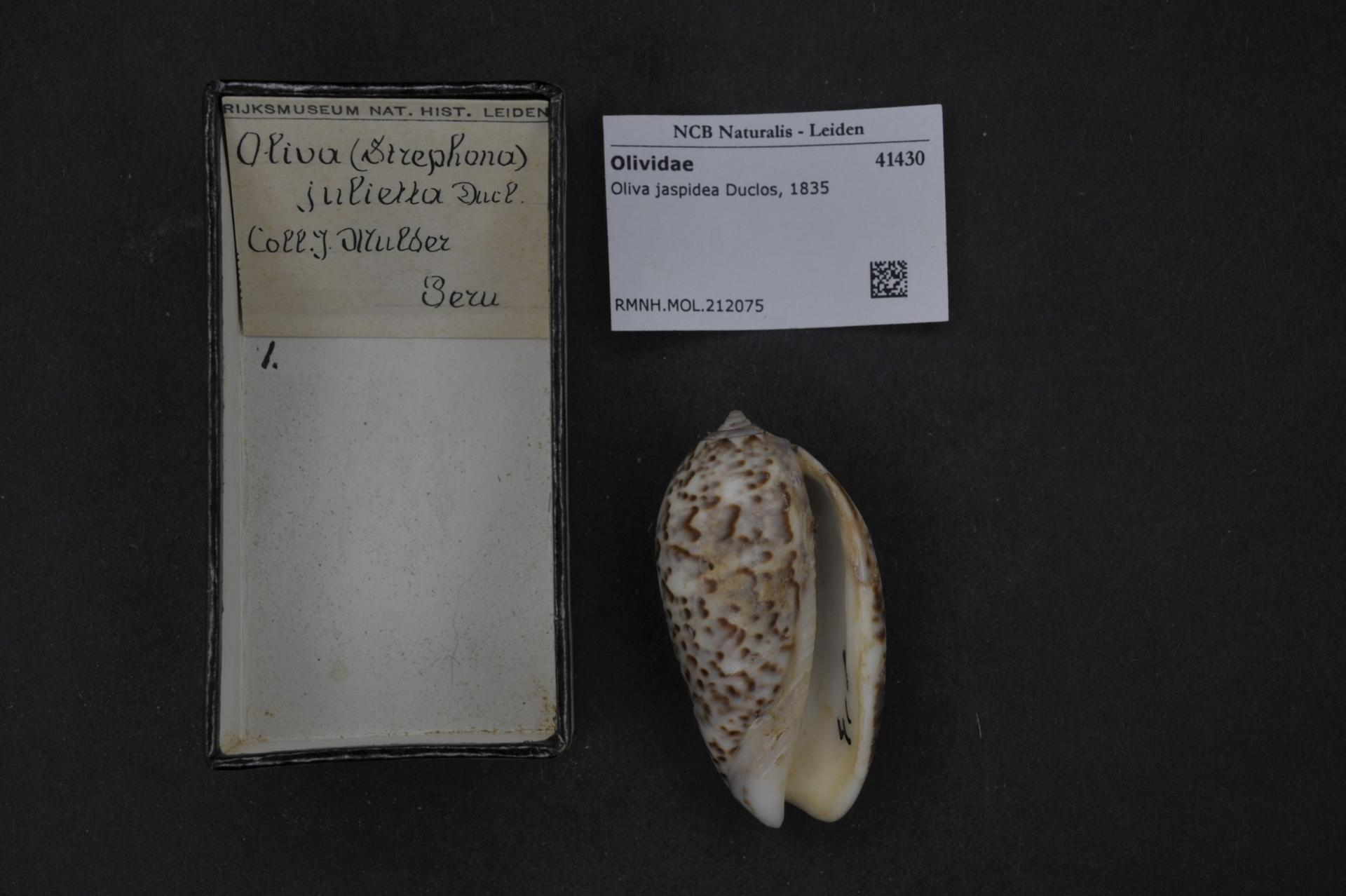

Scientific classification
- Kingdom: Animalia
- Phylum: Mollusca
- Class: Gastropoda
- Subclass: Caenogastropoda
- Order: Neogastropoda
- Family: Olividae
- Genus: Oliva
- Species: O. julieta

Binomial name
- Oliva julieta Duclos, 1840

= Oliva julieta =

Species of gastropod

Oliva julieta is a species of sea snail, a marine gastropod mollusk in the family Olividae, the olive snails.

== Distribution ==
This species inhabits the Pacific Ocean from Costa Rica to Peru.
