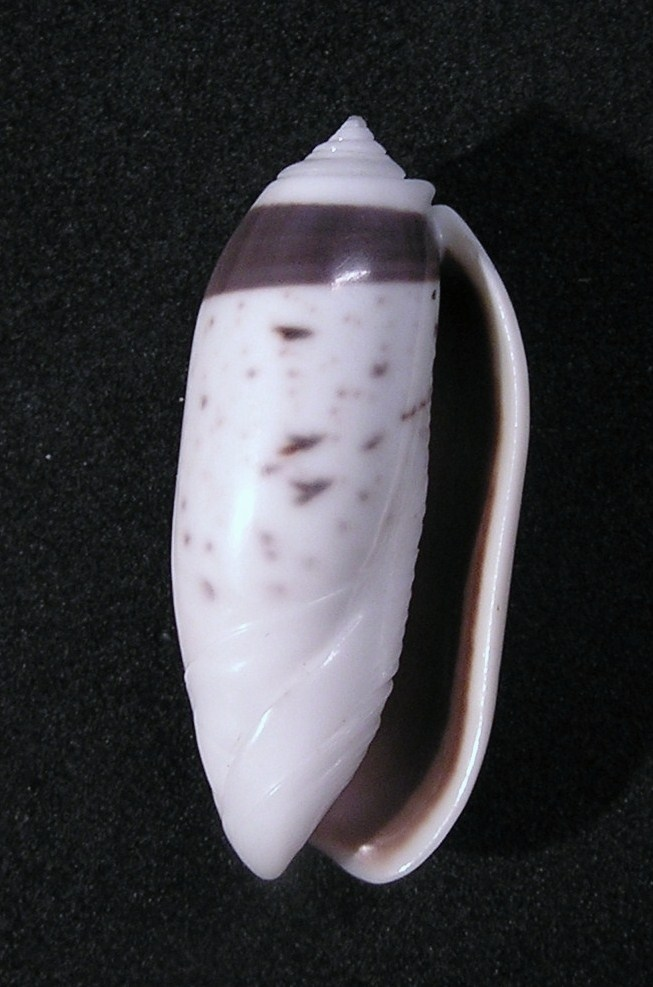
- Apertural view of a shell of Oliva tigridella stellata

Scientific classification
- Kingdom: Animalia
- Phylum: Mollusca
- Class: Gastropoda
- Subclass: Caenogastropoda
- Order: Neogastropoda
- Family: Olividae
- Genus: Oliva
- Species: O. tigridella

Binomial name
- Oliva tigridella Duclos, 1835

Synonyms
- Oliva blanda Marrat, 1867

= Oliva tigridella =

Species of gastropod

Oliva tigridella is a species of sea snail, a marine gastropod mollusk in the family Olividae, the olives.

== Description ==
The length of the shell varies between 15 mm and 42 mm.

== Distribution ==
This marine species occurs from the Philippines, Indonesia to French Polynesia, and Australia.
