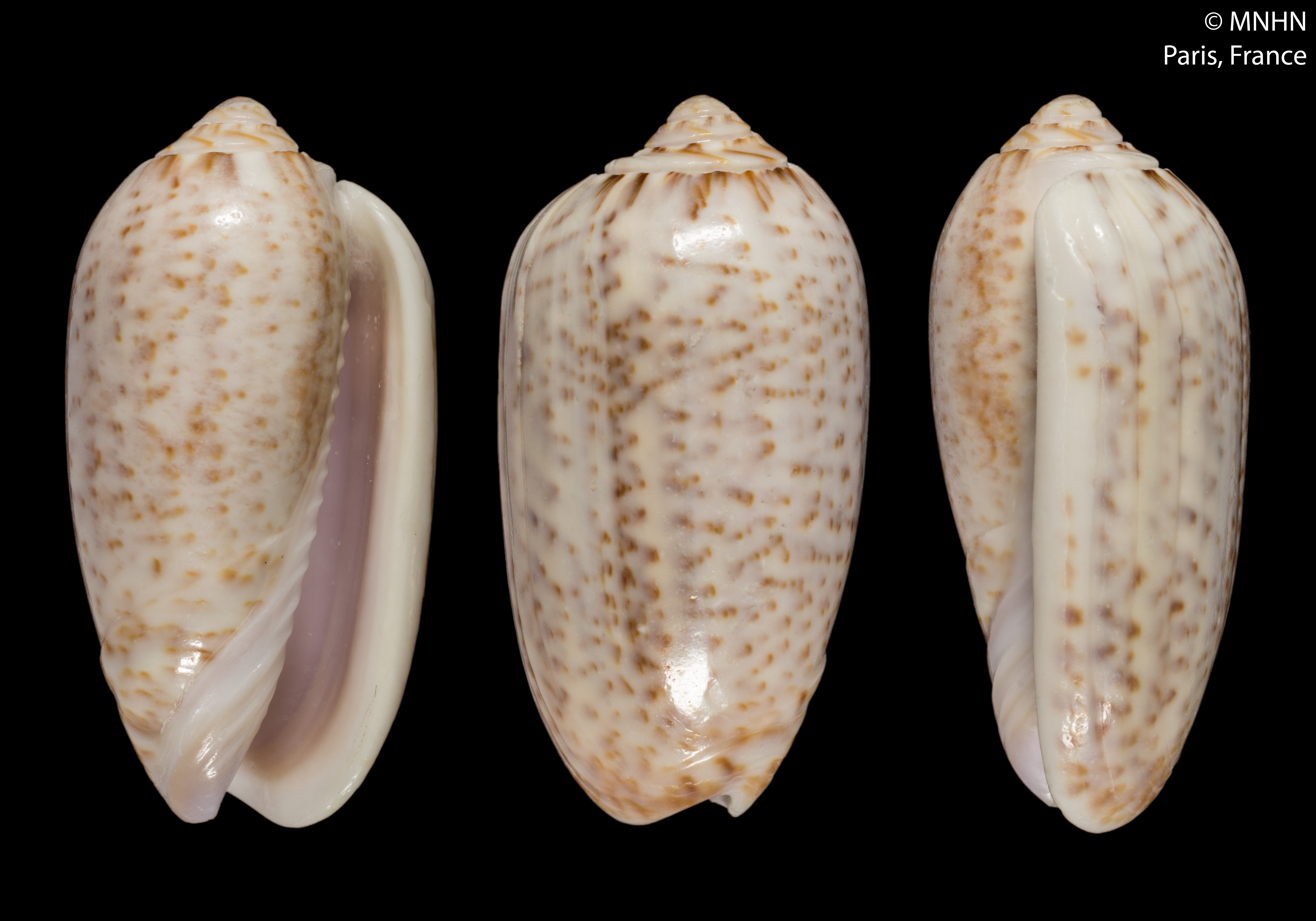
- Shell of Oliva pindarina (syntype at MNHN, Paris)

Scientific classification
- Kingdom: Animalia
- Phylum: Mollusca
- Class: Gastropoda
- Subclass: Caenogastropoda
- Order: Neogastropoda
- Family: Olividae
- Genus: Oliva
- Species: O. pindarina

Binomial name
- Oliva pindarina Duclos, 1840

= Oliva pindarina =

Species of gastropod

Oliva pindarina is a species of sea snail, a marine gastropod mollusk in the family Olividae, the olives.

== Description ==
The length of the shell varies between 25 mm and 58 mm.

== Distribution ==
This marine species occurs in the Sea of Cortez, Mexico.
