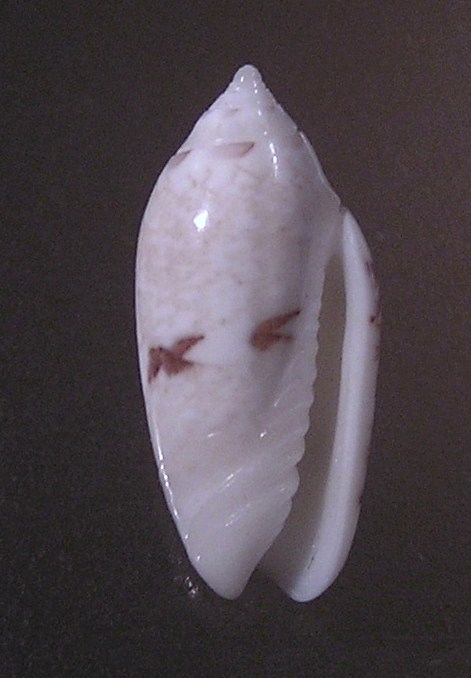

Scientific classification
- Kingdom: Animalia
- Phylum: Mollusca
- Class: Gastropoda
- Subclass: Caenogastropoda
- Order: Neogastropoda
- Family: Olividae
- Genus: Oliva
- Species: O. chrysoplecta

Binomial name
- Oliva chrysoplecta Tursch & Greifender, 1989

Synonyms
- Oliva (Acutoliva) chrysoplecta Tursch & Greifender, 1989

= Oliva chrysoplecta =

Species of gastropod

Oliva chrysoplecta is a species of sea snail, a marine gastropod mollusk in the family Olividae, the olives.

== Description ==
The length of the shell varies between 15 mm and 27 mm.

== Distribution ==
This marine species occurs off Okinawa, the Philippines and Fiji.
