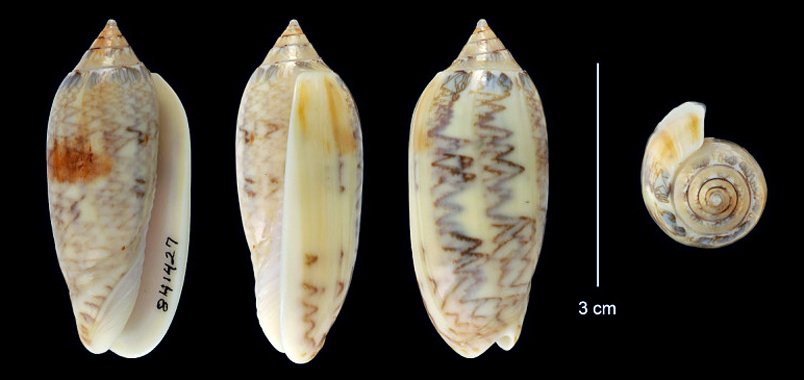
- Shell of Oliva barbadensis (holotype at the Smithsonian Institution)

Scientific classification
- Kingdom: Animalia
- Phylum: Mollusca
- Class: Gastropoda
- Subclass: Caenogastropoda
- Order: Neogastropoda
- Family: Olividae
- Genus: Oliva
- Species: O. barbadensis

Binomial name
- Oliva barbadensis Petuch & Sargent, 1986

= Oliva barbadensis =

Species of gastropod

Oliva barbadensis is a species of sea snail, a marine gastropod mollusk in the family Olividae, the olives.

== Description ==
Original description: "Shell of medium size for subgenus, heavy, thickened, fusiform in shape, body somewhat inflated, wider at midsection than at shoulder; spire elevated, protracted; color yellow to yellow-tan, overlaid with variable amounts of fine brown triangles in a netted pattern; some specimens with large zig-zag areas of bright yellow; body whorl with two bands of darker brown zig-zags; spire whorls with tan-colored callus; shoulder and edge of suture with pale blue patches, corresponding to sutural scalloping pattern; protoconch large; interior of aperture white; columellar area white with 18 to 25 thin plicae.

Size: approximately 40 to 50 mm. in length: rarely to 60+ mm.

Holotype: USNM. 841427, length 50 mm, width 21 mm, trawled from 200 meters depth off St. James, Barbados Island, by research vessel.

Discussion: Oliva barbadensis is closest to Oliva drangai from Tobago, but differs in being a larger, more inflated species, and by having a much darker and more elaborate color pattern."

Holotype of Oliva barbadensis - apertural view

Dorsal view of O. barbadensis holotype

== Distribution ==
Locus typicus: off West coast of Barbados, Lesser Antilles: at 500 ft. depths.

"Endemic to Barbados, where it is common at 100 to 160 meters depth, off the west coast of the island."

This marine species occurs off French Guiana.

== Etymology ==
"Named for Barbados Island, West Indies, the type locality."

== Habitat ==
"This new species is one of the deepest-dwelling olives in the western Atlantic and is known only from deep water surrounding the Barbados seamount." This carnivorous, scavenging Olive responds readily to baited traps.
