= Oliva subangulata =

Scientific classification
- Kingdom: Animalia
- Phylum: Mollusca
- Class: Gastropoda
- Subclass: Caenogastropoda
- Order: Neogastropoda
- Family: Olividae
- Genus: Oliva
- Species: O. subangulata

Binomial name
- Oliva subangulata Philippi, 1848

Species of gastropod

Oliva subangulata is a species of sea snail, a marine gastropod mollusk in the family Olividae, the olives.

== Distribution ==
Pacific Ocean: West coasts of North and South America.
