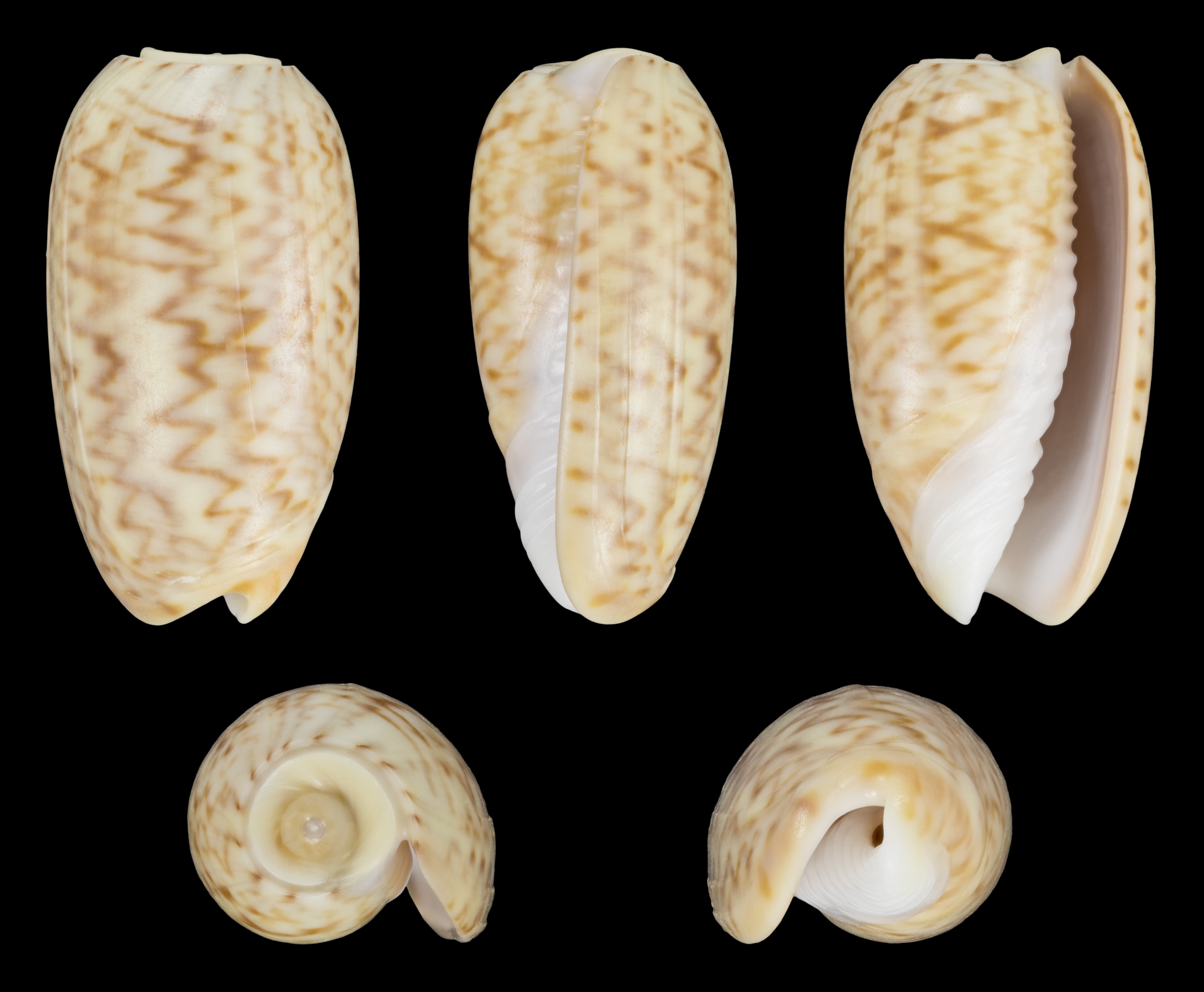

Scientific classification
- Kingdom: Animalia
- Phylum: Mollusca
- Class: Gastropoda
- Subclass: Caenogastropoda
- Order: Neogastropoda
- Family: Olividae
- Genus: Oliva
- Species: O. concavospira

Binomial name
- Oliva concavospira G.B. Sowerby III, 1914

= Oliva concavospira =

Species of gastropod

Oliva concavospira is a species of sea snail, a marine gastropod mollusk in the family Olividae, the olives.
