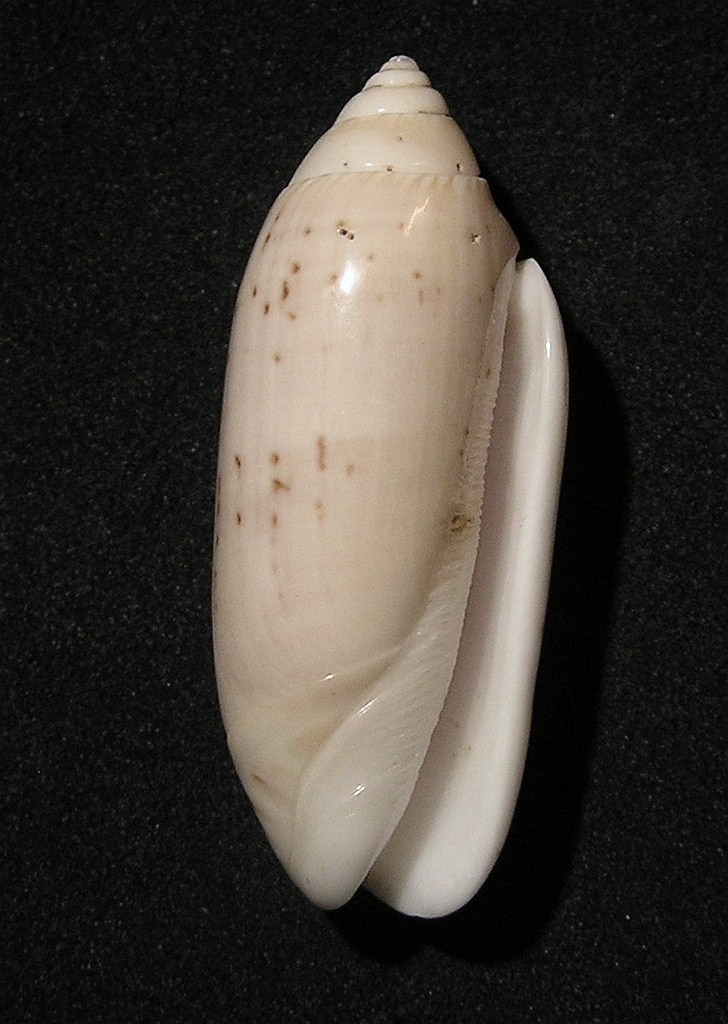
- Apertural view of a shell of Oliva multiplicata

Scientific classification
- Kingdom: Animalia
- Phylum: Mollusca
- Class: Gastropoda
- Subclass: Caenogastropoda
- Order: Neogastropoda
- Family: Olividae
- Genus: Oliva
- Species: O. multiplicata

Binomial name
- Oliva multiplicata Reeve, 1850

Synonyms
- Oliva labuanensis Marrat, 1871; Oliva (Multiplicoliva) multiplicata Reeve, 1850

= Oliva multiplicata =

Species of gastropod

Oliva multiplicata, common name the many-plaited olive, is a species of sea snail, a marine gastropod mollusk in the family Olividae, the olives.

== Description ==
The length of the shell varies between 27 mm and 49 mm.

== Distribution ==
This marine species occurs off Taiwan and from Japan to Indonesia.
