= Oliva polita =

Scientific classification
- Kingdom: Animalia
- Phylum: Mollusca
- Class: Gastropoda
- Subclass: Caenogastropoda
- Order: Neogastropoda
- Family: Olividae
- Genus: Oliva
- Species: O. polita

Binomial name
- Oliva polita Marrat, 1867

Synonyms
- Oliva ceramis Schepman, 1904

Species of gastropod

Oliva polita is a species of sea snail, a marine gastropod mollusk in the family Olividae, the olives.

== Distribution ==
Pacific Ocean: Marquesas Islands.
