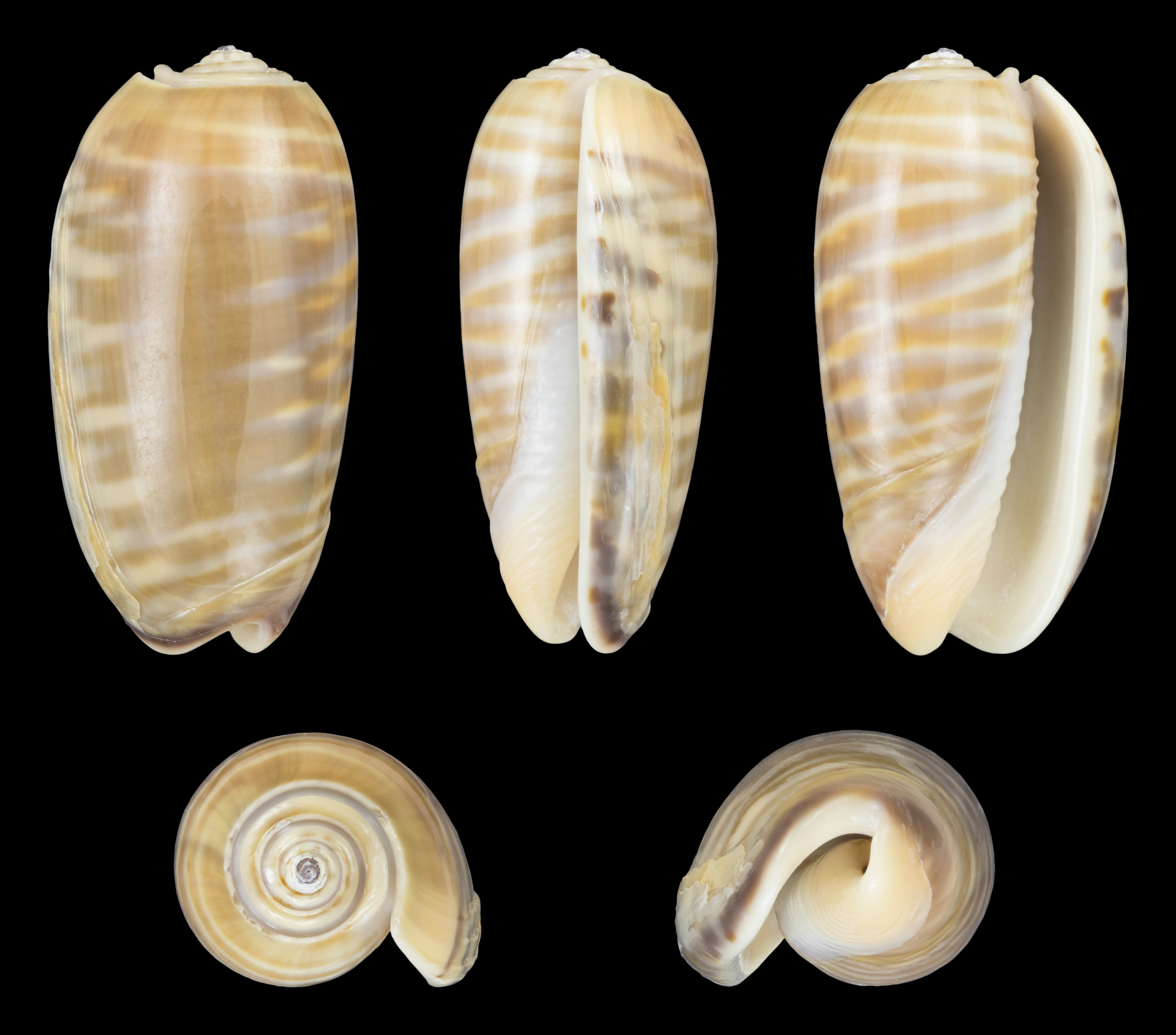

Scientific classification
- Kingdom: Animalia
- Phylum: Mollusca
- Class: Gastropoda
- Subclass: Caenogastropoda
- Order: Neogastropoda
- Family: Olividae
- Genus: Oliva
- Species: O. rufula

Binomial name
- Oliva rufula Duclos, 1840

Synonyms
- Oliva (Rufoliva) rufula Duclos, 1840· accepted, alternate representation

= Oliva rufula =

Species of gastropod

Oliva rufula is a species of sea snail, a marine gastropod mollusk in the family Olividae, the olives.

== Description ==
The length of the shell varies between 25 mm and 40 mm

== Distribution ==
This marine species occurs off the Philippines, the Solomon Islands and off Ambon, Indonesia.
