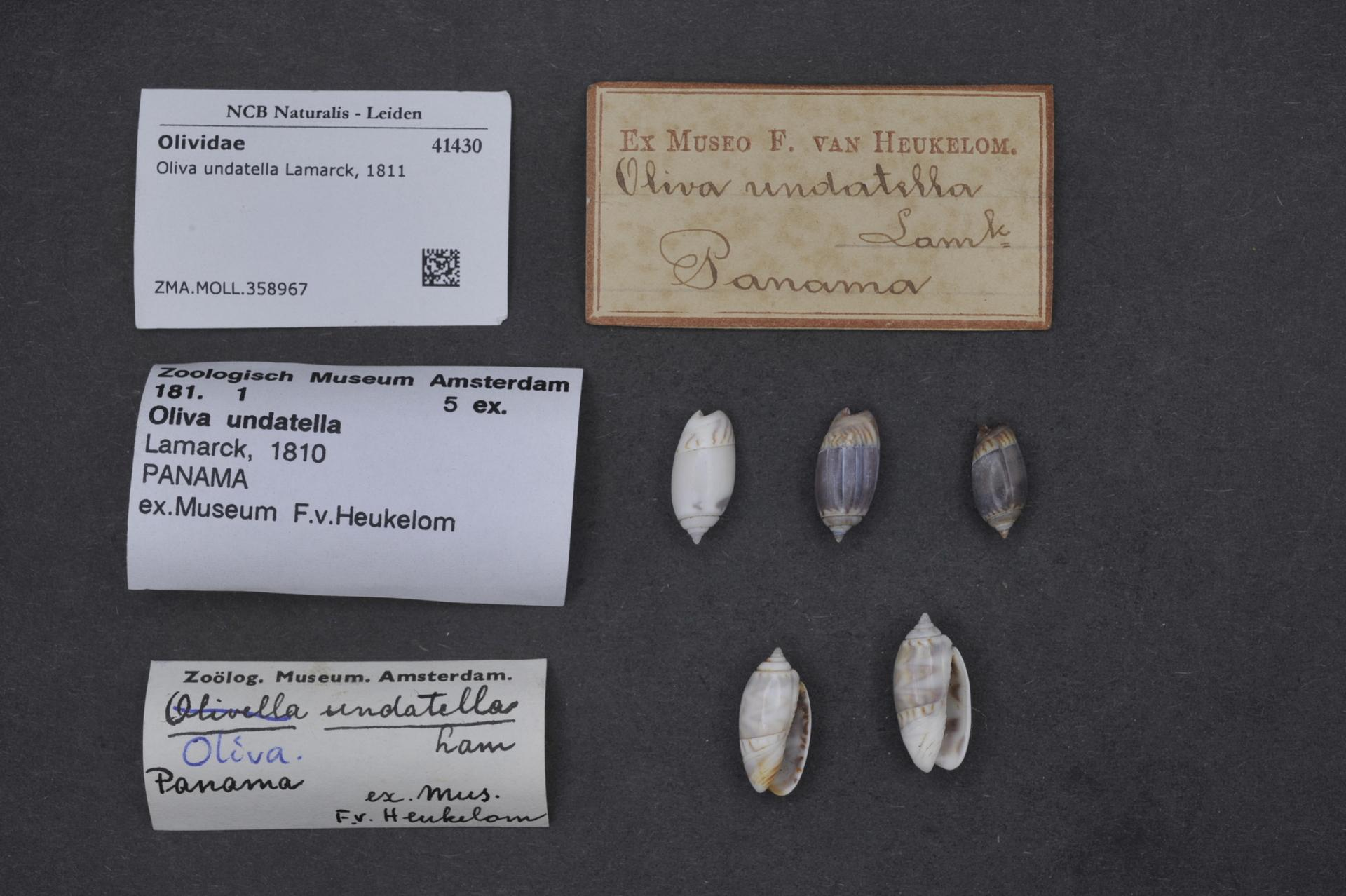

Scientific classification
- Kingdom: Animalia
- Phylum: Mollusca
- Class: Gastropoda
- Subclass: Caenogastropoda
- Order: Neogastropoda
- Family: Olividae
- Genus: Oliva
- Species: O. undatella

Binomial name
- Oliva undatella Lamarck, 1811

Synonyms
- Oliva (Strephonella) undatella Lamarck, 1811· accepted, alternate representation; Oliva nedulina Duclos, 1835; Oliva undatella ecuadoriana Petuch & Sargent, 1986; Oliva undatella equadoriana [sic] (misspelling); Oliva undatella undatella Lamarck, 1811

= Oliva undatella =

Species of gastropod

Oliva undatella is a species of sea snail, a marine gastropod mollusk in the family Olividae, the olives.

== Subspecies ==
- Oliva undatella ecuadoriana Petuch & Sargent, 1986: synonym of Oliva undatella Lamarck, 1811
- Oliva undatella equadoriana [sic] accepted as Oliva undatella Lamarck, 1811 (misspelling)
- Oliva undatella undatella Lamarck, 1811: synonym of Oliva undatella Lamarck, 1811

== Description ==
The length of the shell varies between 10 mm and 25 mm.

== Distribution ==
This marine species occurs from the Gulf of California, Mexico to Peru.
