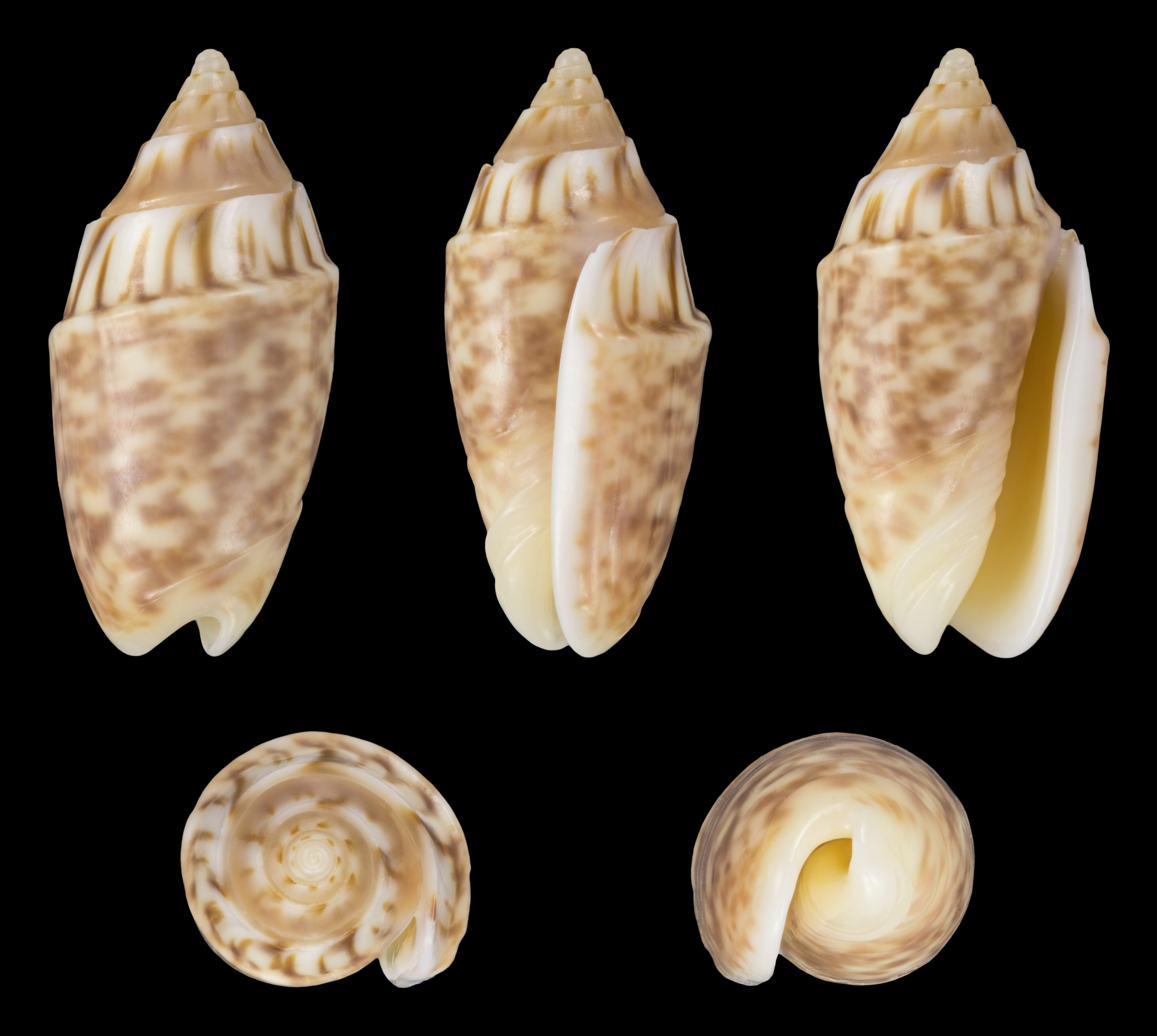

Scientific classification
- Kingdom: Animalia
- Phylum: Mollusca
- Class: Gastropoda
- Subclass: Caenogastropoda
- Order: Neogastropoda
- Family: Olividae
- Genus: Oliva
- Species: O. parkinsoni

Binomial name
- Oliva parkinsoni Prior, 1975

= Oliva parkinsoni =

Species of gastropod

Oliva parkinsoni is a species of sea snail, a marine gastropod mollusk belonging to the family Olividae, the olives.
