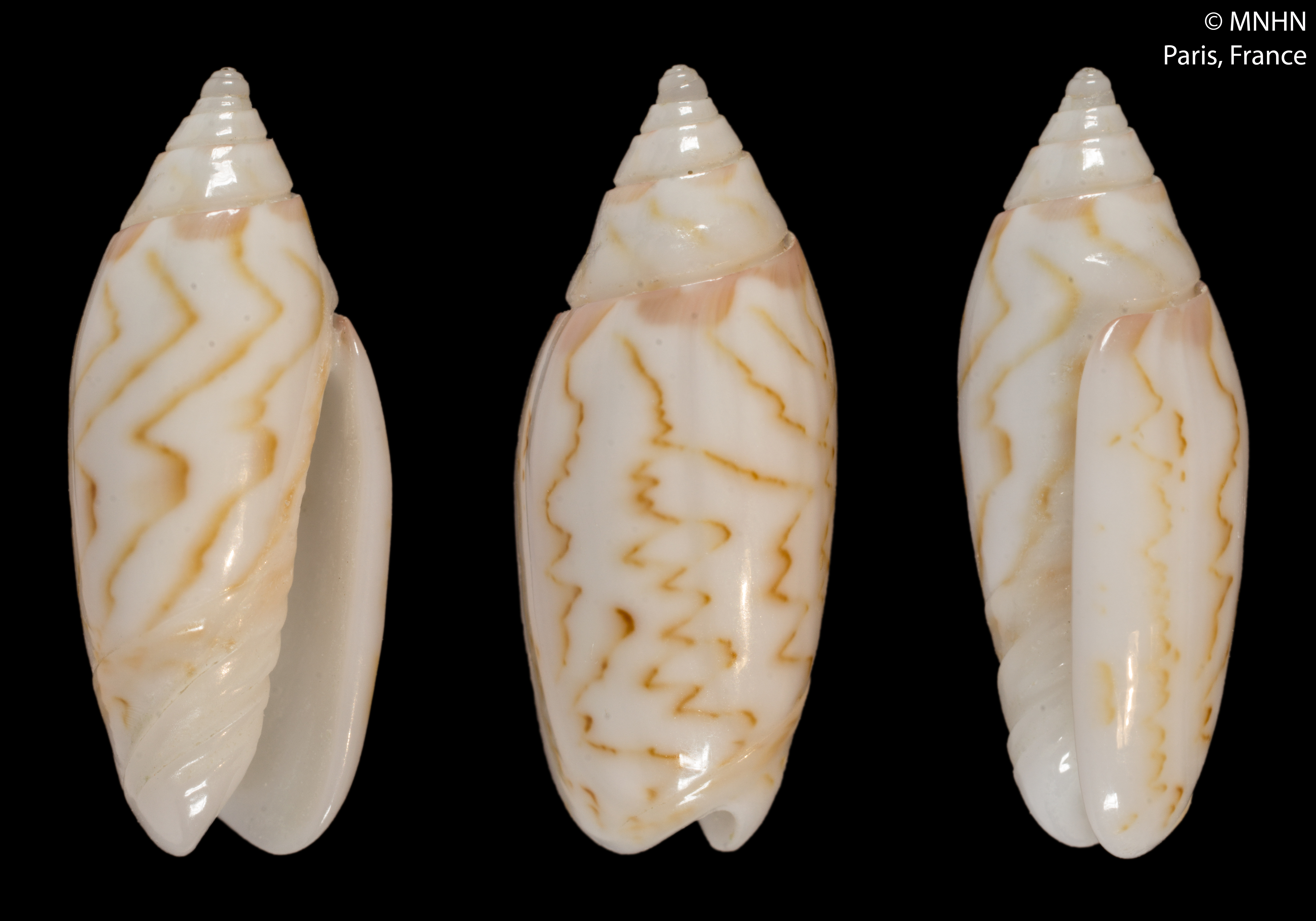
- Shell of Oliva panniculata (syntype at MNHN, Paris)

Scientific classification
- Kingdom: Animalia
- Phylum: Mollusca
- Class: Gastropoda
- Subclass: Caenogastropoda
- Order: Neogastropoda
- Family: Olividae
- Genus: Oliva
- Species: O. panniculata

Binomial name
- Oliva panniculata Duclos, 1835

Synonyms
- Oliva (Acutoliva) panniculata Duclos, 1835· accepted, alternate representation; Oliva (Acutoliva) williamsi Melvill & Standen, 1897; Oliva panniculata panniculata Duclos, 1835· accepted, alternate representation; Olivella williamsi Melvill & Standen, 1897

= Oliva panniculata =

Species of gastropod

Oliva panniculata, common name the silk-clad olive, is a species of sea snail, a marine gastropod mollusk in the family Olividae, the olives.

== Description ==
The length of the shell varies between 13.1 mm and 25 mm.

== Distribution ==
Tjhis marine species occurs off East Africa and in the West Pacific
