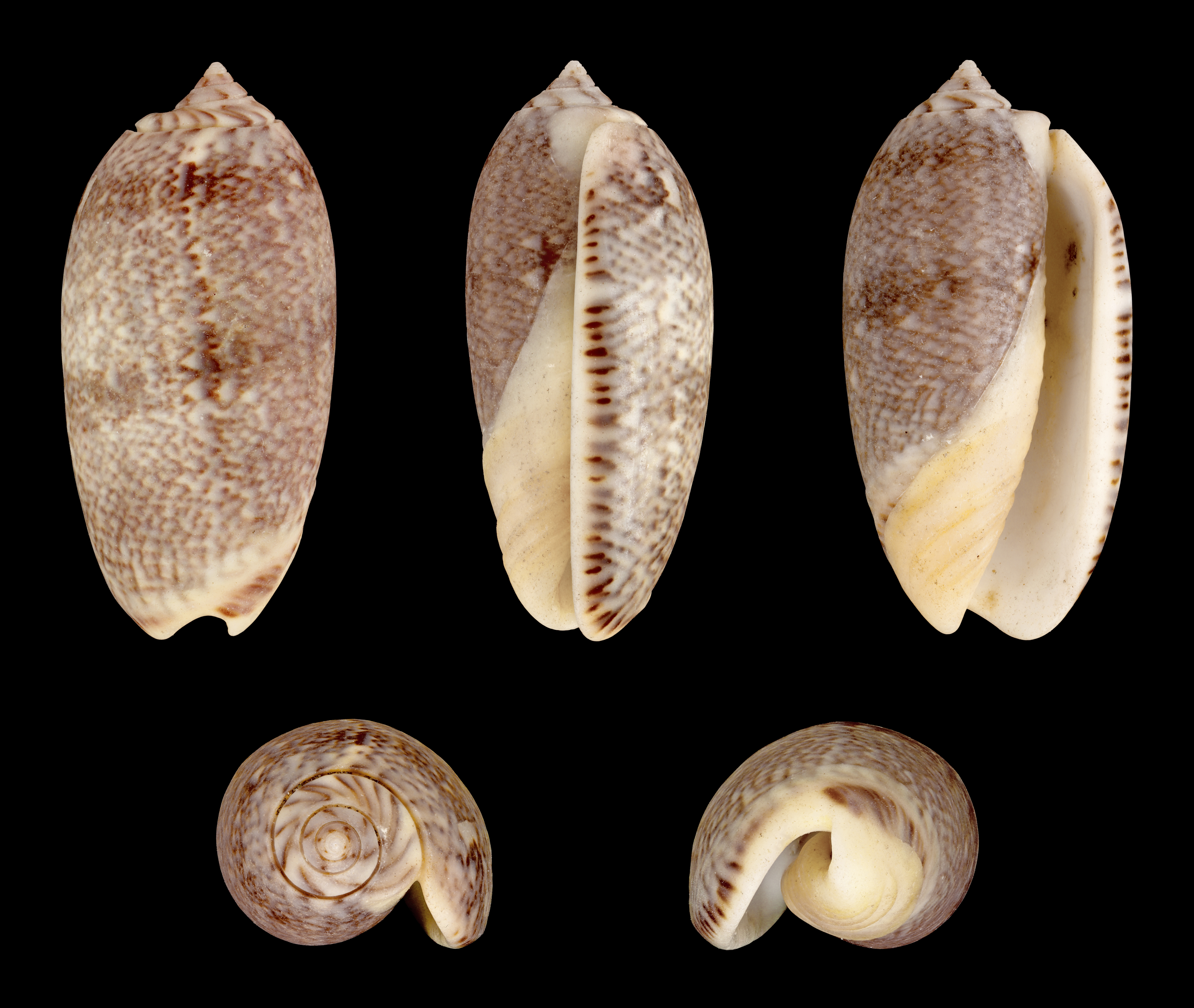
- A shell of Oliva bulbiformis

Scientific classification
- Kingdom: Animalia
- Phylum: Mollusca
- Class: Gastropoda
- Subclass: Caenogastropoda
- Order: Neogastropoda
- Family: Olividae
- Genus: Oliva
- Species: O. bulbiformis

Binomial name
- Oliva bulbiformis Duclos, 1840

Synonyms
- Oliva calosoma Duclos, 1840; Oliva clara Marrat, 1871; Oliva jayana Ducros de Saint Germain, 1857; Oliva laevis Marrat, 1871; Oliva similis Marrat, 1867; Oliva (Oliva) calosoma Duclos, P.L., 1840; Oliva (Oliva) funebralis Lamarck, J.B.P.A. de, 1811; Oliva (Oliva) leucostoma Lamarck, J.B.P.A. de, 1811; Oliva (Carmione) bulbiformis Duclos, 1840

= Oliva bulbiformis =

Species of gastropod

Oliva bulbiformis, or black-tinted olive, is a species of sea snail in the family Olividae.

== Description ==
Bulbiformis shells vary between 21 mm and 45 mm, and come in a variety of colors, including green, ash, tan, and orange.

== Distribution ==
This marine species occurs in the west-central Pacific, including the Bay of Bengal, Sri Lanka, Philippines, Papua New Guinea and Solomon Islands.
