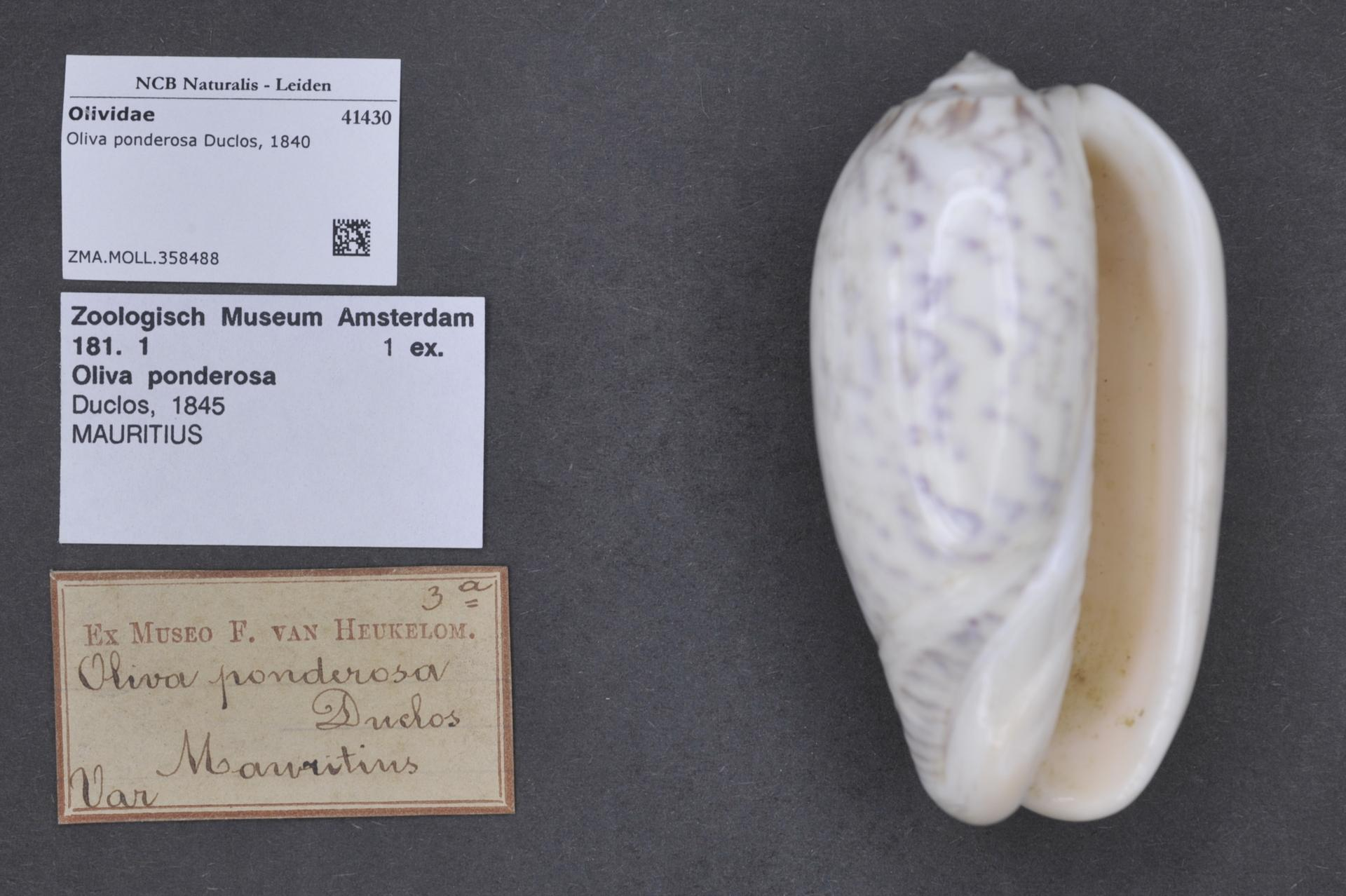

Scientific classification
- Kingdom: Animalia
- Phylum: Mollusca
- Class: Gastropoda
- Subclass: Caenogastropoda
- Order: Neogastropoda
- Family: Olividae
- Genus: Oliva
- Species: O. ponderosa

Binomial name
- Oliva ponderosa Duclos, 1840

Synonyms
- Oliva (Miniaceoliva) ponderosa Duclos, 1840

= Oliva ponderosa =

Species of gastropod

Oliva ponderosa, common name the ponderous olive, is a species of sea snail, a marine gastropod mollusk in the family Olividae, the olives.

== Description ==
The length of the shell varies between 45 mm and 73 mm.

== Distribution ==
This marine species occurs off the Maldives, Mauritius and South India.
