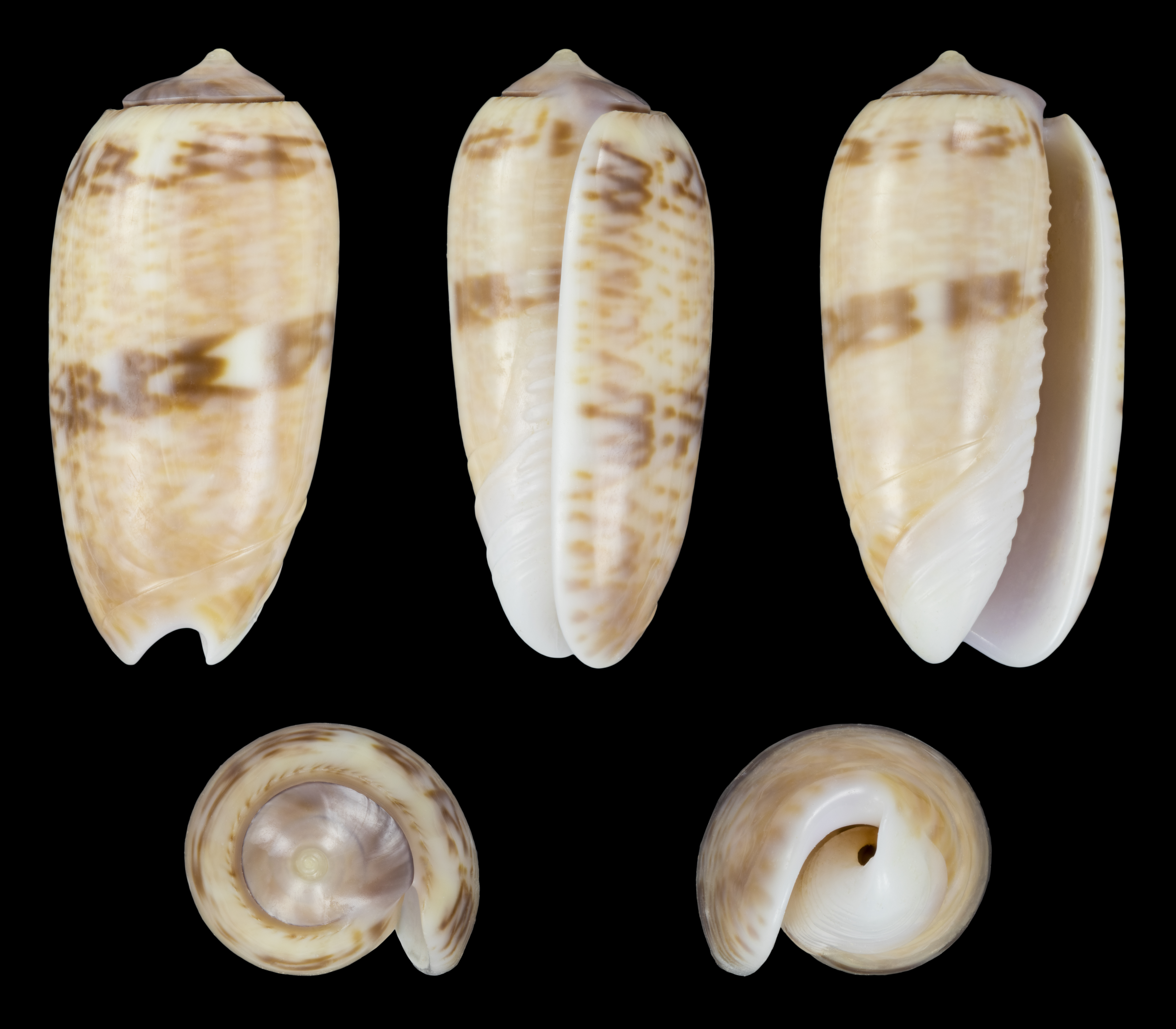

Scientific classification
- Kingdom: Animalia
- Phylum: Mollusca
- Class: Gastropoda
- Subclass: Caenogastropoda
- Order: Neogastropoda
- Family: Olividae
- Genus: Oliva
- Species: O. sidelia

Binomial name
- Oliva sidelia Duclos, 1840

Synonyms
- Oliva faba Marrat, 1867; Oliva (Galeola) sidelia Duclos, 1840

= Oliva sidelia =

Species of gastropod

Oliva sidelia, common name the pretty olive, is a species of sea snail, a marine gastropod mollusk in the family Olividae, the olives or olive snails.

== Description ==
The length of the shell varies between 14 mm and 23 mm.

== Distribution ==
This marine species occurs in the Bay of Bengal; off Philippines, New Guinea and Fiji.
