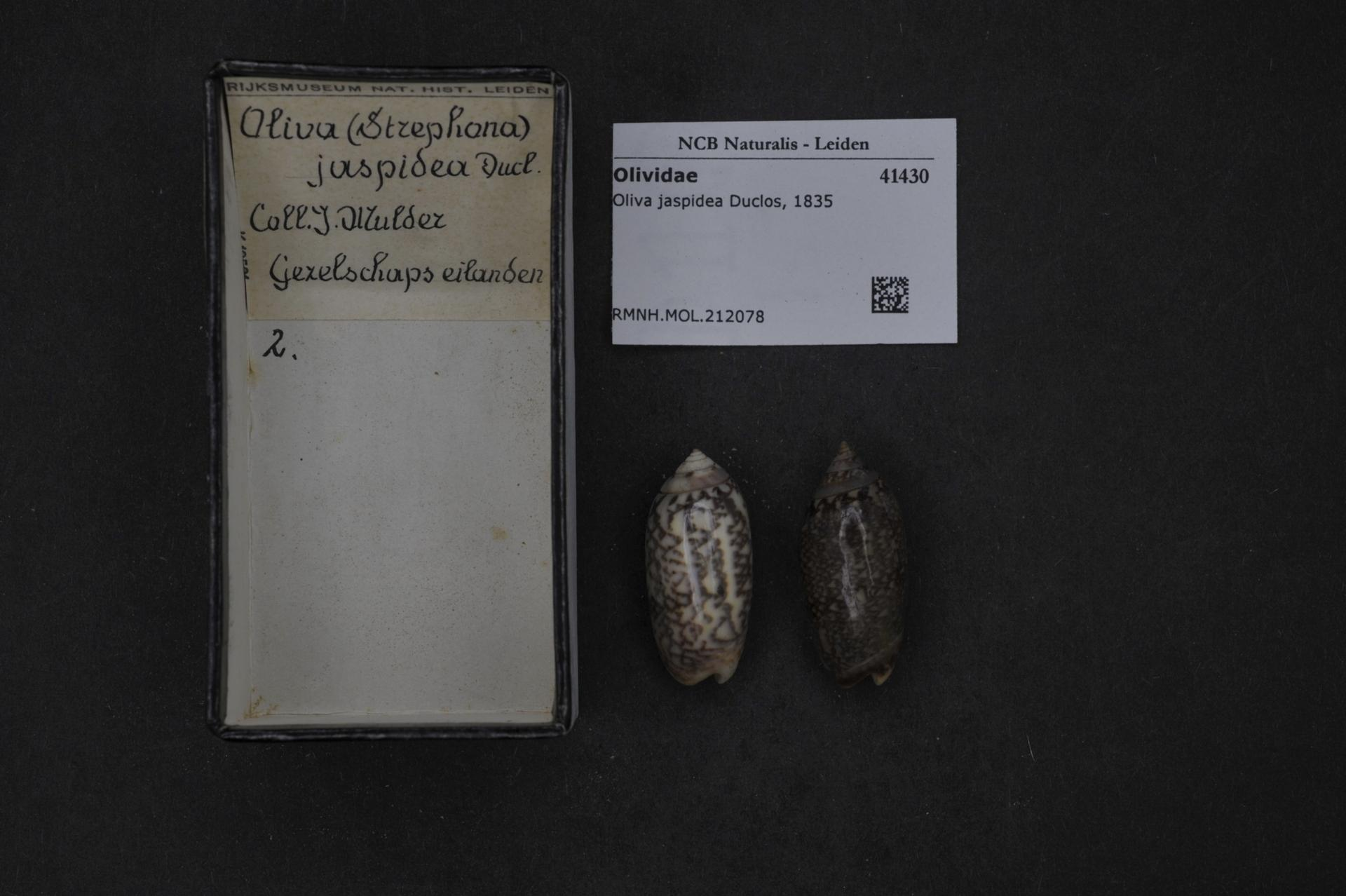

Scientific classification
- Kingdom: Animalia
- Phylum: Mollusca
- Class: Gastropoda
- Subclass: Caenogastropoda
- Order: Neogastropoda
- Family: Olividae
- Genus: Oliva
- Species: O. esiodina

Binomial name
- Oliva esiodina Duclos, 1844

Synonyms
- Oliva (Acutoliva) duclosi Reeve, 1850· accepted, alternate representation; Oliva (Acutoliva) esiodina Duclos, 1844· accepted, alternate representation; Oliva (Acutoliva) lentiginosa Reeve, 1850; Oliva duclosi Reeve, 1850; Oliva jaspidea Duclos, 1835; Oliva lengtinosa Reeve, 1850

= Oliva esiodina =

Species of gastropod

Oliva esiodina is a species of sea snail, a marine gastropod mollusk in the family Olividae, the olives.

== Distribution ==
This marine species occurs in Oceania.
