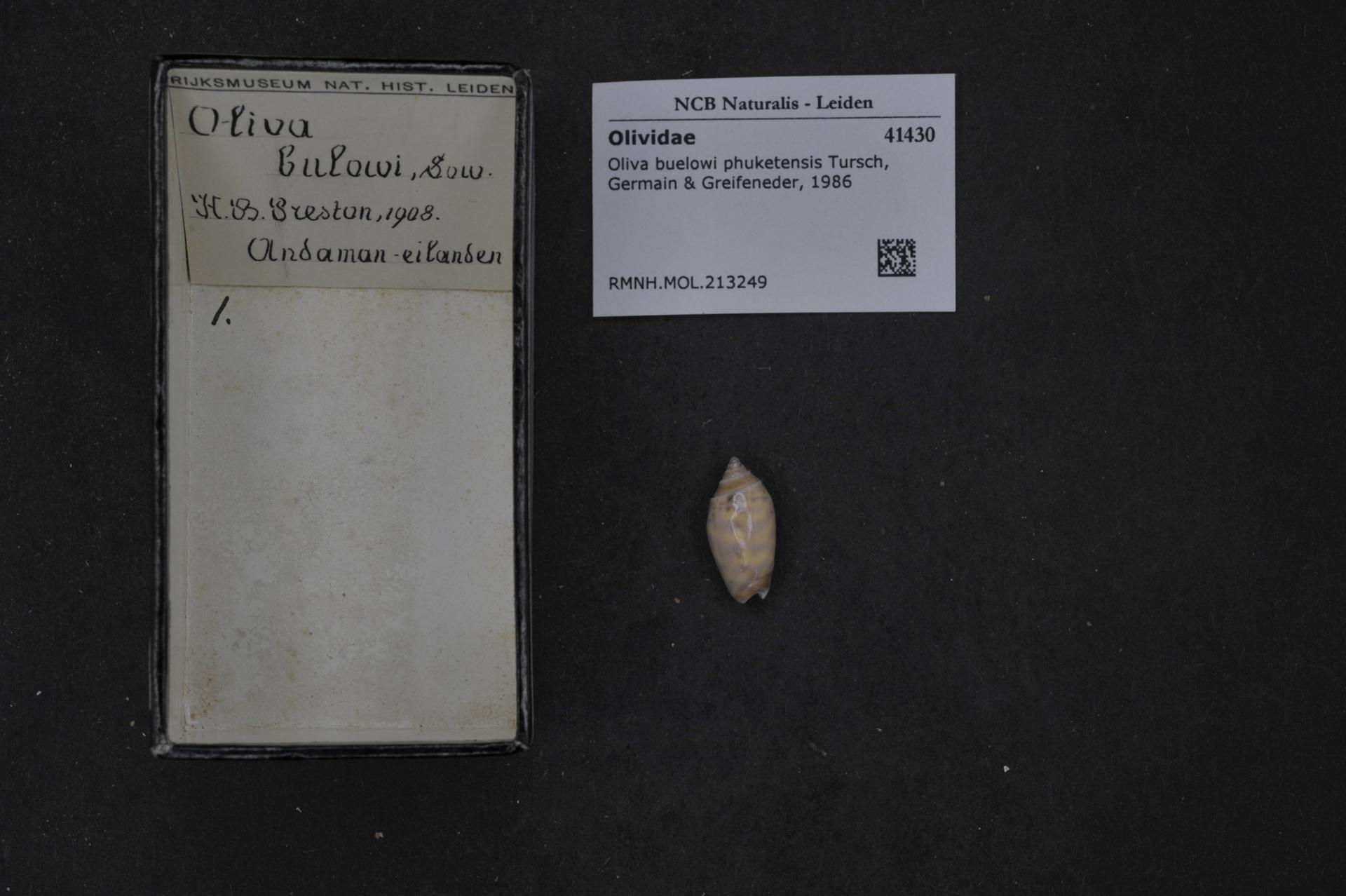
- Preserved specimen

Scientific classification
- Kingdom: Animalia
- Phylum: Mollusca
- Class: Gastropoda
- Subclass: Caenogastropoda
- Order: Neogastropoda
- Family: Olividae
- Genus: Oliva
- Species: O. buelowi

Binomial name
- Oliva buelowi G.B. Sowerby III, 1890

= Oliva buelowi =

Species of gastropod

Oliva buelowi is a species of sea snail, a marine gastropod mollusk in the family Olividae, the olives.
