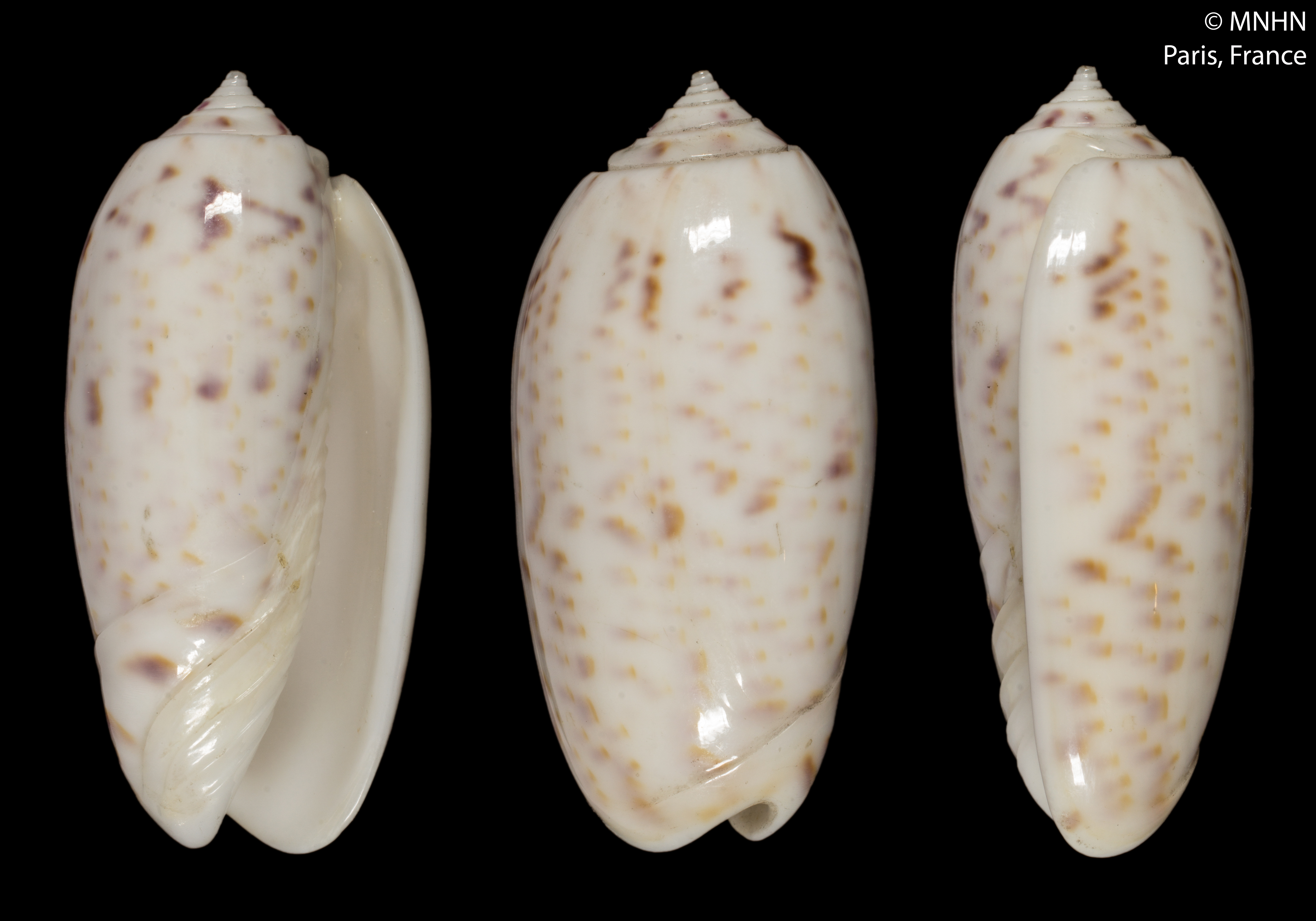
- Shell of Oliva atalina (syntype at MNHN, Paris)

Scientific classification
- Kingdom: Animalia
- Phylum: Mollusca
- Class: Gastropoda
- Subclass: Caenogastropoda
- Order: Neogastropoda
- Family: Olividae
- Genus: Oliva
- Species: O. atalina

Binomial name
- Oliva atalina Duclos, 1835

Synonyms
- Oliva (Miniaceoliva) atalina Duclos, 1835; Oliva quersolina Duclos, 1835

= Oliva atalina =

Species of gastropod

Oliva atalina is a species of sea snail, a marine gastropod mollusk in the family Olividae, the olives.

== Description ==
Shell size 40-45 mm.

== Distribution ==
Indian Ocean: endemic to Mauritius, and in the seas around China and Japan.
