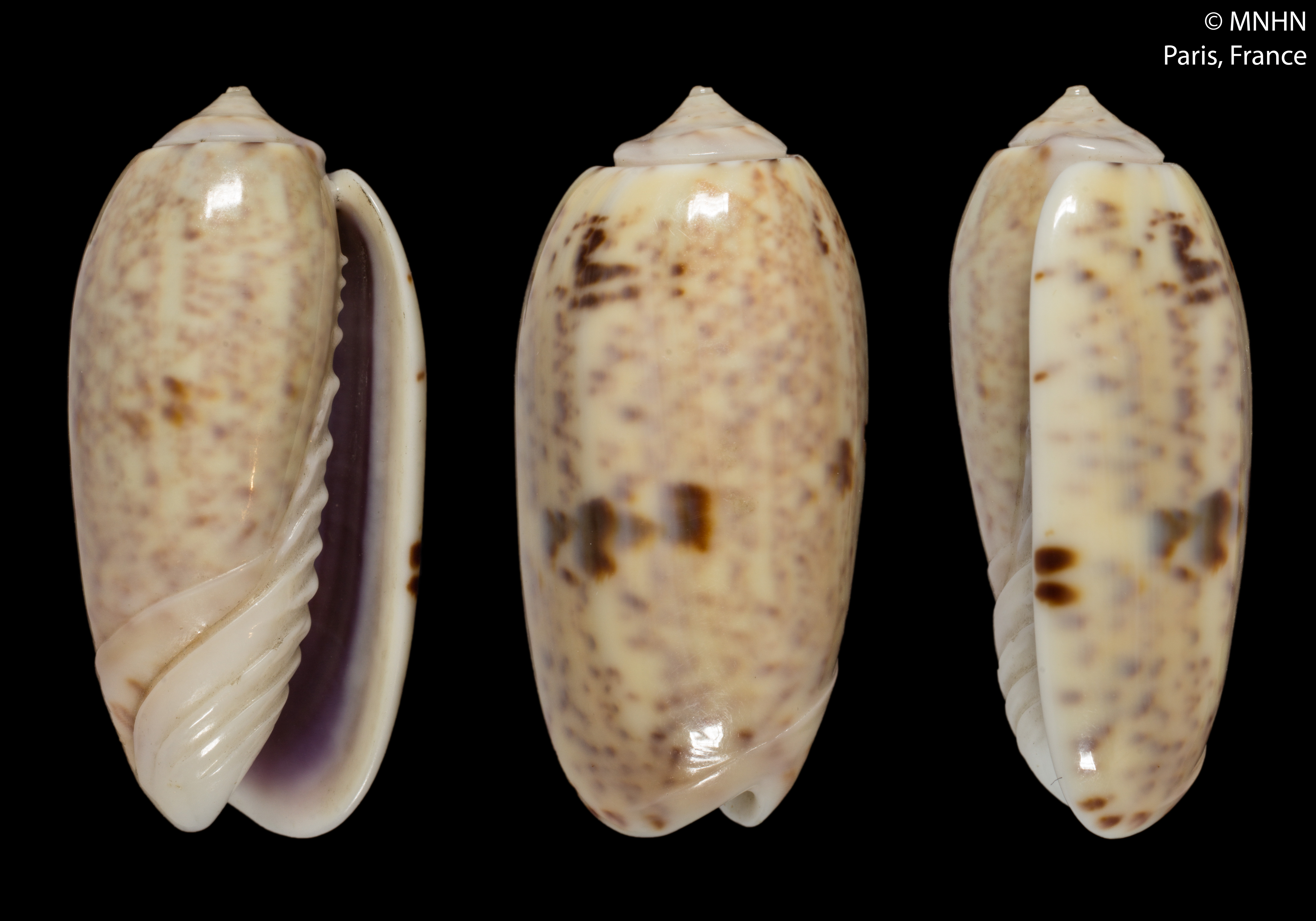
- Shell of Oliva emeliodina (syntype at MNHN, Paris)

Scientific classification
- Kingdom: Animalia
- Phylum: Mollusca
- Class: Gastropoda
- Subclass: Caenogastropoda
- Order: Neogastropoda
- Family: Olividae
- Genus: Oliva
- Species: O. emeliodina

Binomial name
- Oliva emeliodina Duclos, 1845

Synonyms
- Oliva sairousa Kilburn, 1980

= Oliva emeliodina =

Species of gastropod

Oliva emeliodina is a species of sea snail, a marine gastropod mollusk in the family Olividae, the olives.

== Description ==
Shell size 35–40 mm.

== Distribution ==
This marine species occurs off Vietnam and Southern Mozambique.
