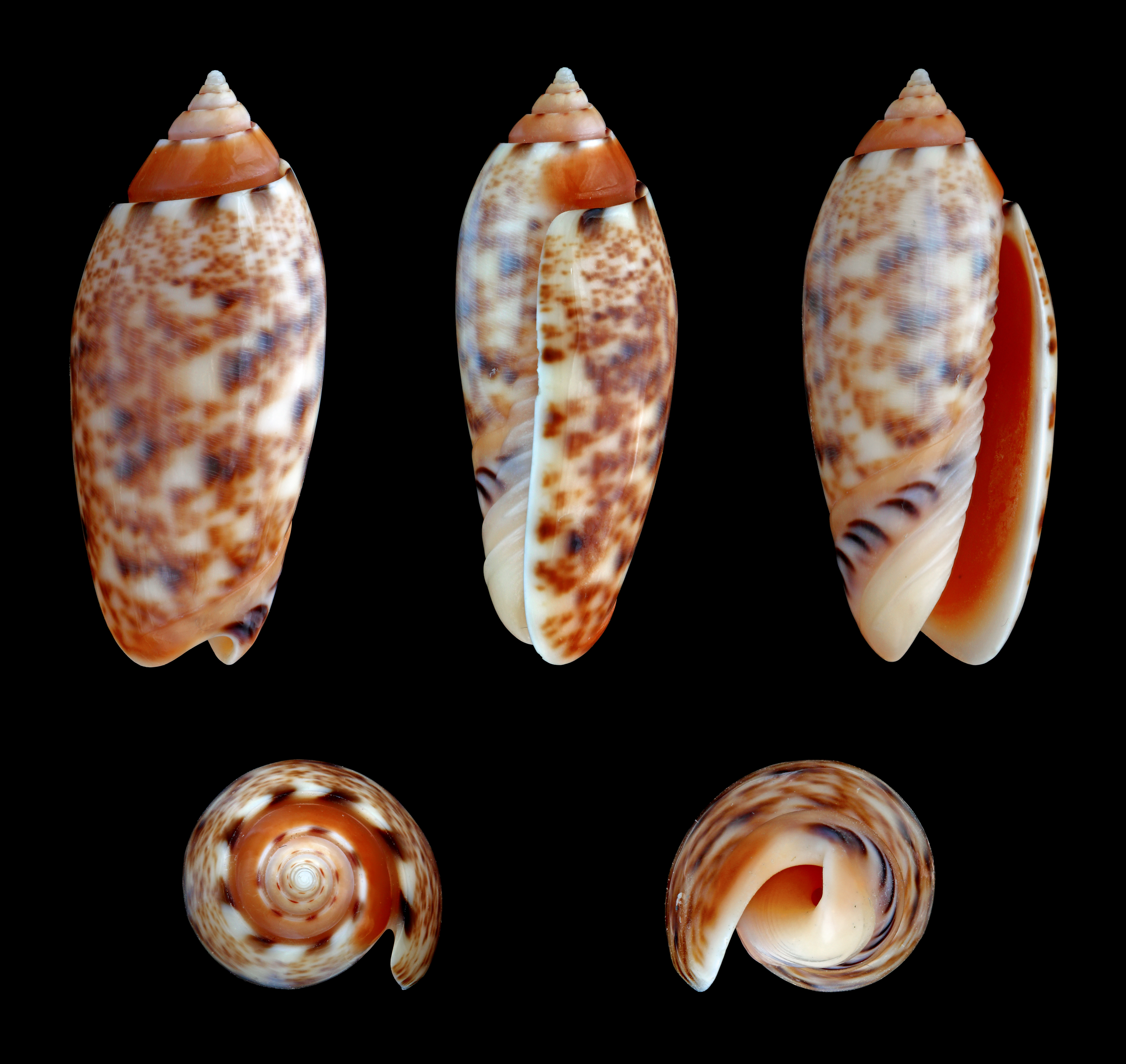
- Five views of a shell of Oliva mantichora

Scientific classification
- Kingdom: Animalia
- Phylum: Mollusca
- Class: Gastropoda
- Subclass: Caenogastropoda
- Order: Neogastropoda
- Family: Olividae
- Genus: Oliva
- Species: O. mantichora

Binomial name
- Oliva mantichora Duclos, 1840

Synonyms
- Oliva (Annulatoliva) annulata annulata mantichora Duclos, P.L., 1840; Oliva emicator Marrat, 1871; Oliva intricata Dautzenberg, 1927

= Oliva mantichora =

Species of gastropod

Oliva mantichora, common name the amethyst olive, is a species of sea snail, a marine gastropod mollusk in the family Olividae, the olives.

Subspecies

- Oliva mantichora intricata Dautzenberg, 1927
- Oliva mantichora mantichora Duclos, 1840

== Description ==
The length of the shell varies between 25 mm and 53 mm. There is some variation in color and shape between the two subspecies. Oliva mantichora mantichora is generally cream-colored and robust, whereas Oliva mantichora intricata is generally orange-brown in color and more cylindrical.

== Distribution ==
This marine species occurs in the Western Indian Ocean to Japan and New Guinea.
