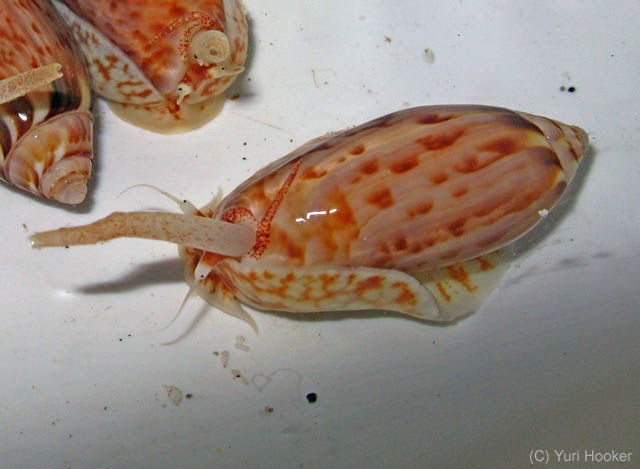
- live Vullietoliva kaleontina
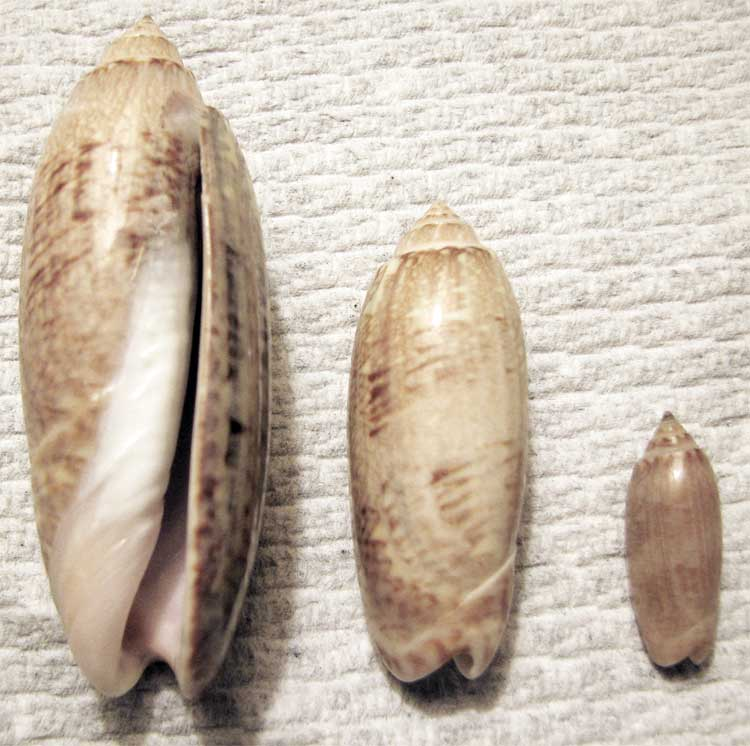
- Shells of Lettered olive, Americoliva sayana

Scientific classification
- Kingdom: Animalia
- Phylum: Mollusca
- Class: Gastropoda
- Subclass: Caenogastropoda
- Order: Neogastropoda
- Superfamily: Olivoidea
- Family: Olividae; Latreille, 1825

Genera
- See text

Synonyms
- Olivancillariidae

= Olive snail =

Family of molluscs

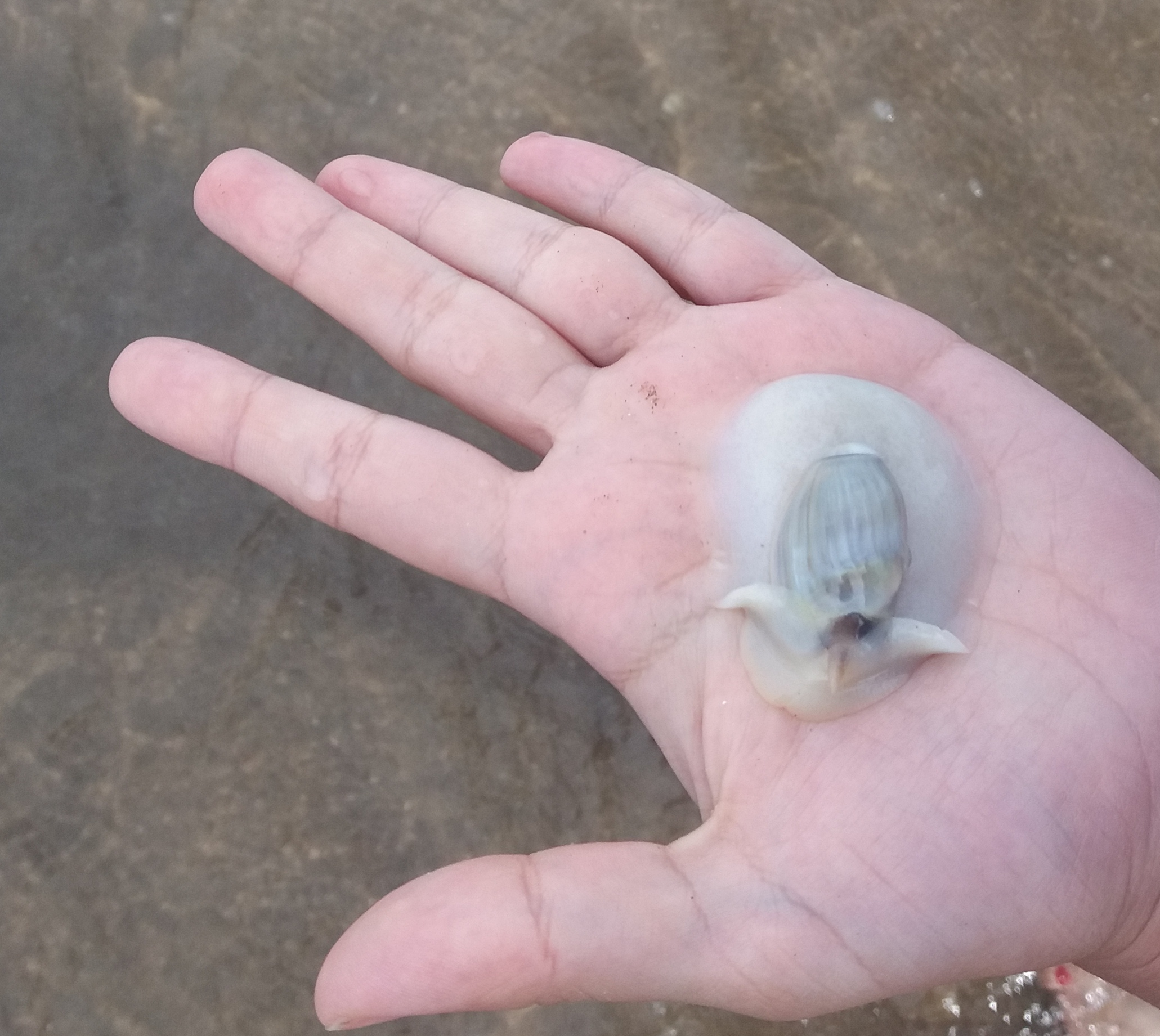
Specimen from the Argentine coast

Olive snails, also known as olive shells and olives, scientific name Olividae, are a taxonomic family of medium to large predatory sea snails with smooth, shiny, elongated oval-shaped shells.

The shells often show various muted but attractive colors, and may be patterned also. They are marine gastropod molluscs in the family Olividae within the main clade Neogastropoda.

== Taxonomy ==
According to the Revised Classification, Nomenclator and Typification of Gastropod Families (2017) the family Olividae consists of five subfamilies:

- Olivinae Latreille, 1825 – synonyms: Dactylidae H. Adams & A. Adams, 1853 (inv.);
- Agaroniinae Olsson, 1956
- Calyptolivinae Kantor, Fedosov, Puillandre, Bonillo & Bouchet, 2017
- Olivancillariinae Golikov & Starobogatov, 1975
- Olivellinae Troschel, 1869

== Distribution ==
Olive snails are found worldwide, in subtropical and tropical seas and oceans.

== Habitat ==
These snails are found on sandy substrates intertidally and subtidally.

== Life habits ==
The olive snails are all carnivorous sand-burrowers. They feed mostly on bivalves and carrion and are known as some of the fastest burrowers among snails. They secrete a mucus similar to that of the Muricidae, from which a purple dye can be made.

== Shell description ==
Physically the shells are oval and cylindrical in shape. They have a well-developed stepped spire. Olive shells have a siphonal notch at the posterior end of the long narrow aperture. The siphon of the living animal protrudes from the siphon notch.

The shell surface is extremely glossy because in life the mantle almost always covers the shell.

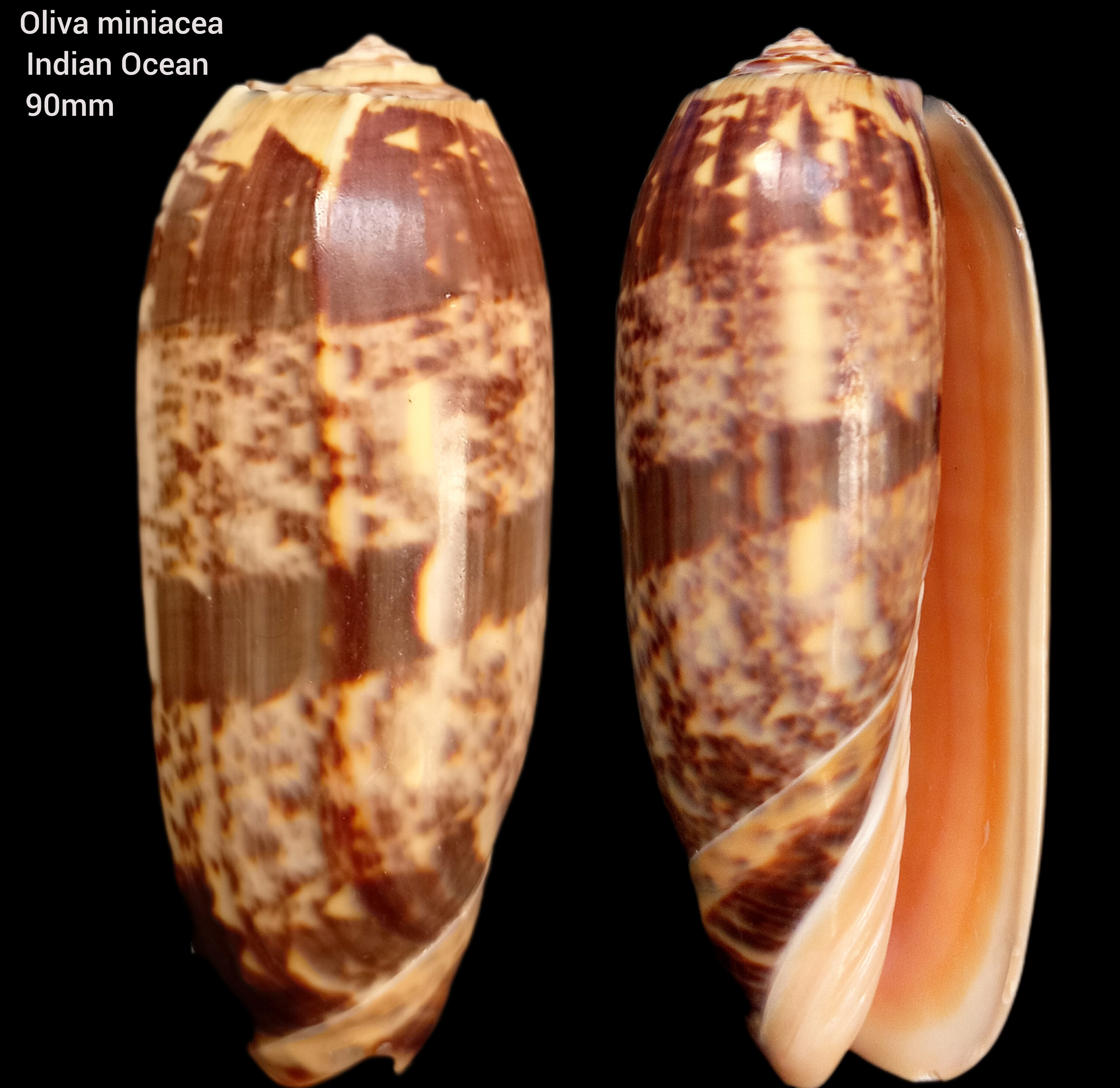
Oliva miniacea

== The fossil record ==
Olive shells first appeared during the Campanian.

== Human use ==
Olive shells are popular with shell collectors, and are also often made into jewelry and other decorative items.

The shell of the lettered olive, Oliva sayana, is the state shell of South Carolina in the United States.

== Genera ==
Genera within the family Olividae include:

- Agaronia Gray, 1839
- Americoliva Petuch, 2013 (synonym of Oliva)
- Callianax H. Adams & A. Adams, 1853
- Calyptoliva Kantor & Bouchet, 2007
- Cupidoliva Iredale, 1924
- Felicioliva Petuch & Berschauer, 2017
- † Lamprodomina Marwick, 1931
- Miniaceoliva Petuch & Sargent, 1986
- Oliva Bruguière, 1789
- Olivancillaria d'Orbigny, 1840
- Omogymna Martens, 1897
- † Pseudolivella Glibert, 1960
- Recourtoliva Petuch & Berschauer, 2017
- † Spirancilla H. E. Vokes, 1936
- †Torqueoliva Landau, da Silva & Heitz, 2016
- Uzamakiella Habe, 1958
- Vullietoliva Petuch & Berschauer, 2017

Genera brought into synonymy

- Chilotygma H. Adams & A. Adams, 1853: synonym of Ancilla Lamarck, 1799
- Hiatula Swainson, 1831: synonym of Agaronia Gray, 1839
- Lintricula H. Adams & A. Adams, 1853: synonym of Olivancillaria d'Orbigny, 1840
- Porphyria Röding, 1798 : synonym of Oliva Bruguière, 1789
- Scaphula Swainson, 1840: synonym of Olivancillaria d'Orbigny, 1840

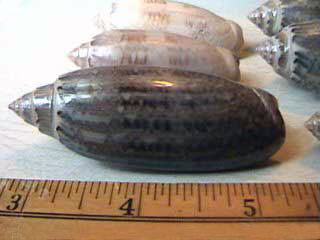
Lettered olive, Oliva sayana

== See also ==
- Olivella This genus has now been moved to the Olivellidae according to the taxonomy of Bouchet & Rocroi.
