= Oliva mucronata =

Scientific classification
- Kingdom: Animalia
- Phylum: Mollusca
- Class: Gastropoda
- Subclass: Caenogastropoda
- Order: Neogastropoda
- Family: Olividae
- Genus: Oliva
- Species: O. mucronata

Binomial name
- Oliva mucronata Marrat, 1871

Species of gastropod

Oliva mucronata is a species of sea snail, a marine gastropod mollusk in the family Olividae, the olives.
