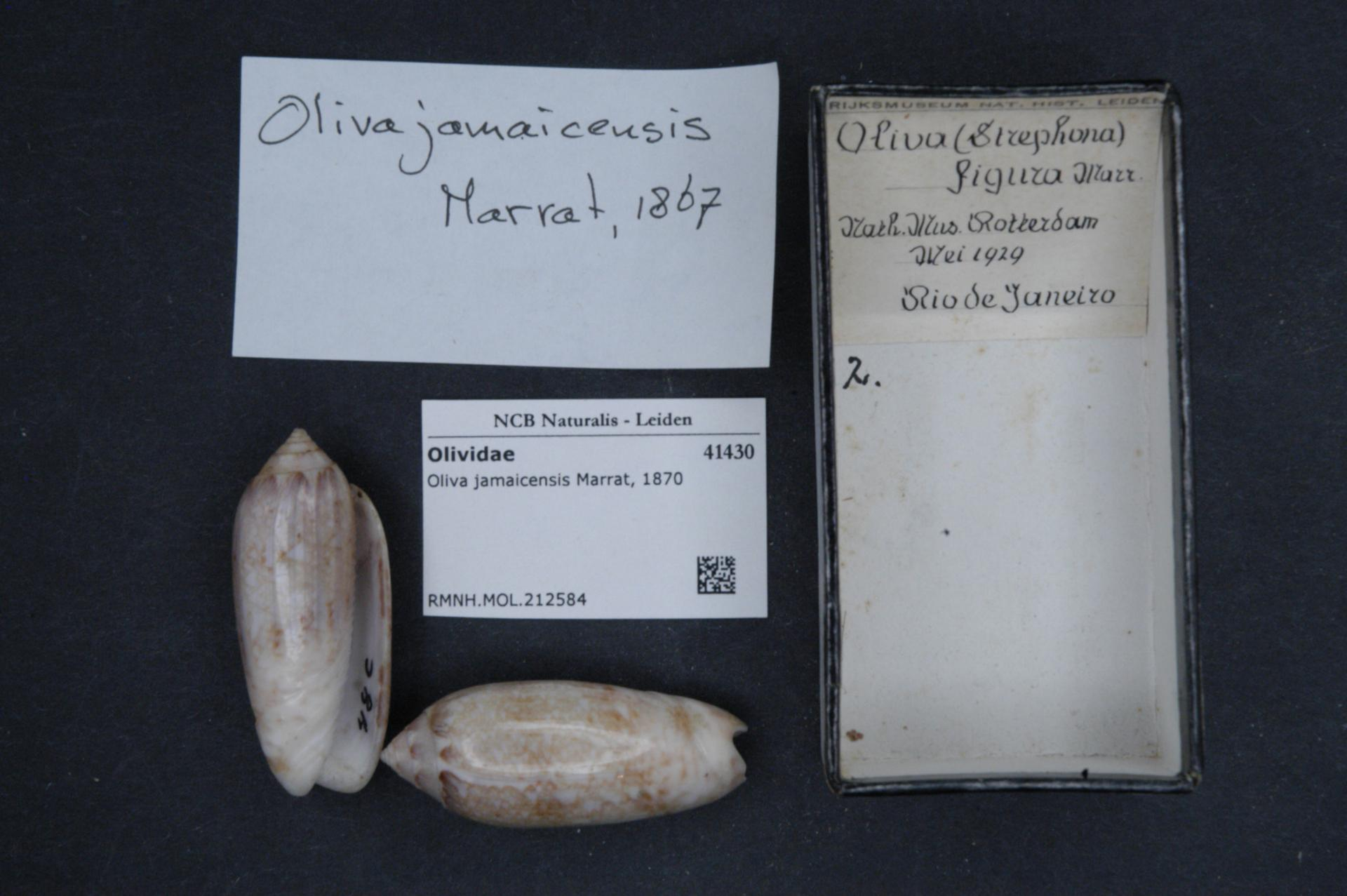

Scientific classification
- Kingdom: Animalia
- Phylum: Mollusca
- Class: Gastropoda
- Subclass: Caenogastropoda
- Order: Neogastropoda
- Family: Olividae
- Genus: Oliva
- Species: O. jamaicensis

Binomial name
- Oliva jamaicensis Marrat, 1870

= Oliva jamaicensis =

Species of gastropod

Oliva jamaicensis is a species of sea snail, a marine gastropod mollusk in the family Olividae, the olives.
