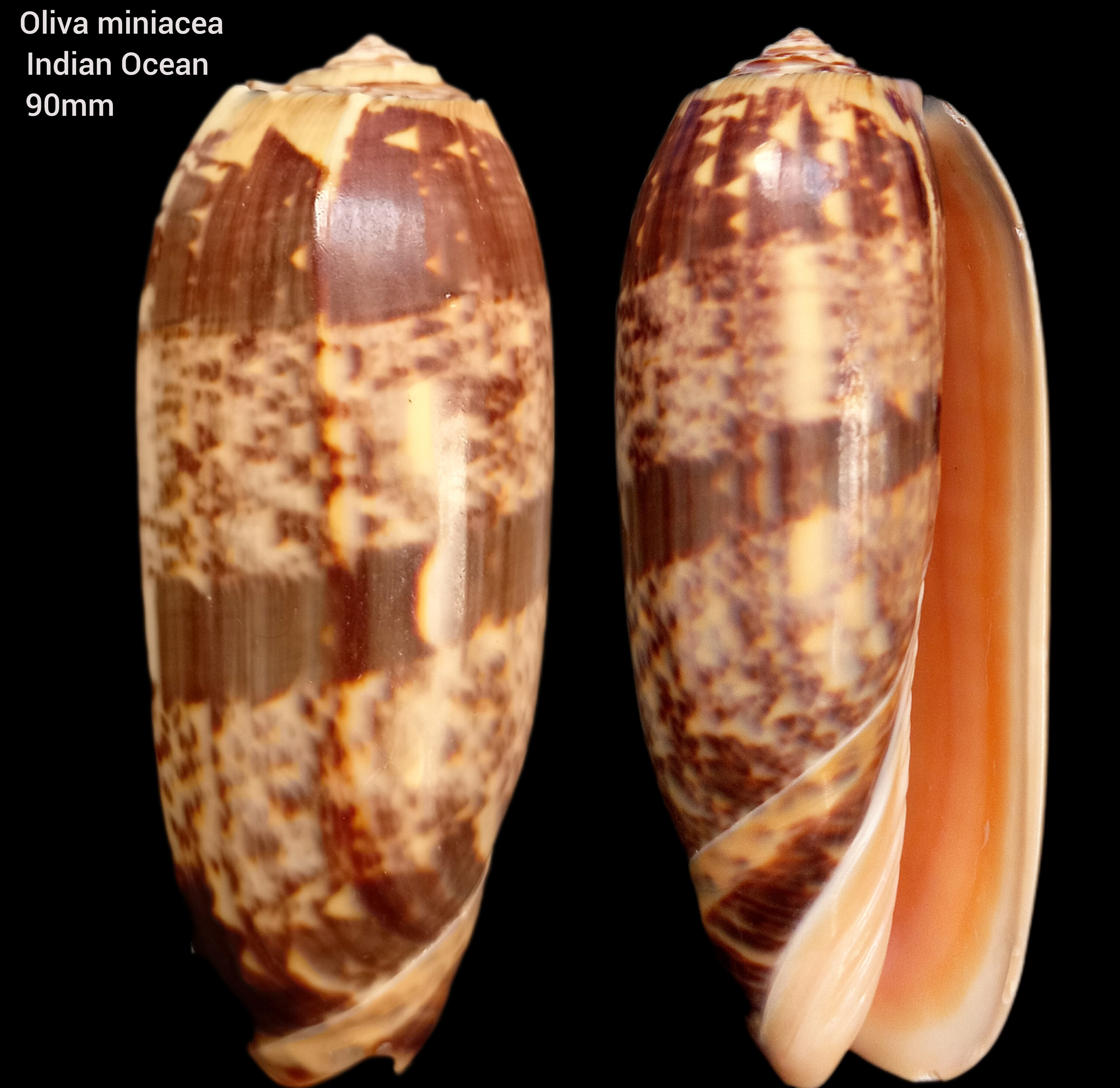
- Oliva miniacea

Scientific classification
- Kingdom: Animalia
- Phylum: Mollusca
- Class: Gastropoda
- Subclass: Caenogastropoda
- Order: Neogastropoda
- Superfamily: Olivoidea
- Family: Olividae
- Subfamily: Olivinae
- Genus: Oliva; Bruguière, 1789

Type species
- Voluta oliva Linnaeus, 1758

Synonyms
- Acutoliva Petuch & Sargent, 1986; Americoliva Petuch, 2013; Annulatoliva Petuch & Sargent, 1986; Carmione Gray, 1858; Galeola Gray, 1858 (original rank); Miniaceoliva Petuch & Sargent, 1986; Oliva (Acutoliva) Petuch & Sargent, 1986· accepted, alternate representation; Oliva (Americoliva) Petuch, 2013· accepted, alternate representation (original rank); Oliva (Annulatoliva) Petuch & Sargent, 1986· accepted, alternate representation; Oliva (Arctoliva) Petuch & Sargent, 1986· accepted, alternate representation; Oliva (Cariboliva) Petuch & Sargent, 1986· accepted, alternate representation; Oliva (Carmione) Gray, 1858; Oliva (Galeola) Gray, 1858· accepted, alternate representation; Oliva (Miniaceoliva) Petuch & Sargent, 1986; Oliva (Multiplicoliva) Petuch & Sargent, 1986· accepted, alternate representation; Oliva (Musteloliva) Petuch & Sargent, 1986· accepted, alternate representation; Oliva (Neocylindrus) P. Fischer, 1883· accepted, alternate representation; Oliva (Oliva) Bruguière, 1789· accepted, alternate representation; Oliva (Parvoliva) Thiele, 1929 accepted, alternate representation; Oliva (Porphyria) Röding, 1798· accepted, alternate representation; Oliva (Proxoliva) Petuch & Sargent, 1986· accepted, alternate representation; Oliva (Rufoliva) Petuch & Sargent, 1986· accepted, alternate representation; Oliva (Strephonella) Dall, 1909· accepted, alternate representation; Oliva (Viduoliva) Petuch & Sargent, 1986· accepted, alternate representation; Porphyria Röding, 1798; Strephona Gray, 1847; Strephopoma [sic] (misspelling); Viduoliva Petuch & Sargent, 1986

= Oliva (gastropod) =

Genus of gastropods

Oliva is a genus of medium-sized to large sea snails, marine gastropod mollusks in the subfamily Olivinae of the family Olividae, the olive snails or olive shells. Many former species of Oliva have been reclassified under genus Americoliva.

== Species ==
According to the World Register of Marine Species, the genus Oliva includes the following accepted species:

- Oliva amethystina (Röding, 1798)
  - Oliva amethystina guttata (Lamarck, 1811)
- Oliva angustata Marrat, 1868
- Oliva annulata (Gmelin, 1791) (nomen dubium)
- Oliva atalina Duclos, 1835
- Oliva athenia Duclos, 1835
- Oliva australis Duclos, 1835
- Oliva bahamasensis Petuch & Sargent, 1986
- Oliva baileyi Petuch, 1979
- † Oliva balteata Raven & Recourt, 2018
- Oliva barbadensis Petuch & Sargent, 1986
- Oliva bathyalis Petuch & Sargent, 1986
- Oliva bayeri Petuch, 2001
- † Oliva bekenuensis Raven & Recourt, 2018
- Oliva bewleyi Marrat, 1870
- Oliva bifasciata Kuster, 1878
- Oliva brettinghami Bridgman, 1909
- Oliva brunellae Cossignani, 2019
- Oliva buelowi G. B. Sowerby III, 1889
- Oliva bulbiformis Duclos, 1835
- Oliva bulbosa (Röding, 1798)
- Oliva caerulea (Röding, 1798)
- Oliva carneola (Gmelin, 1791)
- Oliva caroliniana Duclos, 1835
- Oliva chrysoplecta Tursch & Greifeneder, 1989
- Oliva circinata Marrat, 1871
- Oliva concavospira G. B. Sowerby III, 1914
- † Oliva curta Raven & Recourt, 2018
- Oliva cylindrica Marrat, 1867
- Oliva dactyliola Duclos, 1835
- Oliva deynzerae Petuch & Sargent, 1986
- Oliva drangai Schwengel, 1951
- Oliva dubia Schepman, 1904
- Oliva elegans Lamarck, 1811
- Oliva emeliodina Duclos, 1845
- Oliva esiodina Duclos, 1844
- Oliva faba Marrat, 1867
- Oliva februaryana Falconieri, 2008
- Oliva figura Marrat, 1870
- Oliva fijiana Tursch & Greifeneder, 2001
- Oliva flammulata Lamarck, 1811
- Oliva fulgurator (Röding, 1798)
- Oliva goajira Petuch & Sargent, 1986
- Oliva grovesi (Petuch & R. F. Meyers, 2014)
- Oliva guttata Fischer von Waldheim, 1808
- Oliva harpularia Lamarck, 1811
- Oliva hilli Petuch & Sargent, 1986
- Oliva hirasei Kuroda & Habe, 1952
- Oliva incrassata (Lightfoot, 1786)
- Oliva irisans Lamarck, 1811
- Oliva jamaicensis Marrat, 1867
- Oliva joyceae Petuch & Sargent, 1986
- Oliva julieta Duclos, 1835
- Oliva keenii Marrat, 1870
- Oliva kerstitchi da Motta, 1985
- Oliva kohi Hunon, Rabiller & Richard, 2016
- Oliva kohi Hunon, Rabiller & Richard, 2016
- Oliva kurzi Petuch & Sargent, 1986
- Oliva lacanientai Greifeneder & Blöcher, 1985
- Oliva lamberti Jousseaume, 1884
- Oliva lecoquiana Ducros de Saint Germain, 1857
- Oliva leonardhilli Petuch & Sargent, 1986
- Oliva macleaya Duclos, 1840
- Oliva maculata Duclos, 1840
- Oliva mantichora Duclos, 1835
- Oliva matchetti (Petuch & R. F. Meyers, 2014)
- Oliva mcleani (Petuch & R. F. Meyers, 2014)
- Oliva mindanaoensis Petuch & Sargent, 1986
- Oliva miniacea (Röding, 1798)
- Oliva mooreana Petuch, 2013
- Oliva mucronata Marrat, 1871
- Oliva multiplicata Reeve, 1850
- Oliva mustelina Lamarck, 1811
  - Oliva mustelina virgata Sterba, 2005
- Oliva neostina Duclos, 1840
- Oliva nitidula Duclos, 1835
- Oliva nivosa Marrat, 1871
- Oliva obesina Duclos, 1835
- Oliva oliva (Linnaeus, 1758)
- Oliva olssoni Petuch & Sargent, 1986
- Oliva ornata Marrat, 1867
- Oliva ouini Kantor & Tursch, 1998
- Oliva ozodona Duclos, 1835
- Oliva pacifica Marrat, 1870
- Oliva panniculata Duclos, 1835
- Oliva parkinsoni Prior, 1975
- Oliva pica Lamarck, 1811
- Oliva picta Reeve, 1850
- Oliva pindarina Duclos, 1835
- Oliva polita Marrat, 1867
- Oliva polpasta Duclos, 1833
- Oliva ponderosa Duclos, 1835
- Oliva porphyria (Linnaeus, 1758)
- Oliva reclusa Marrat, 1871
- Oliva recourti (Petuch & R. F. Meyers, 2014)
- Oliva reticularis Lamarck, 1811
- Oliva reticulata (Röding, 1798)
- Oliva rubrolabiata H. Fischer, 1903
- Oliva rufofulgurata Schepman, 1904
- Oliva rufula Duclos, 1835
- Oliva sargenti Petuch, 1987
- Oliva sayana Ravenel, 1834
- Oliva scripta Lamarck, 1811
- Oliva semmelinki Schepman, 1891
- Oliva sericea (Röding, 1798)
- Oliva sidelia Duclos, 1835
- Oliva spicata (Röding, 1798)
- Oliva subangulata Philippi, 1848
- Oliva sunderlandi Petuch, 1987
- † Oliva telescopica Raven & Recourt, 2019
- Oliva tessellata Lamarck, 1811
- Oliva tigridella Duclos, 1835
- Oliva tigrina Lamarck, 1811
- Oliva timoria Duclos, 1840
- Oliva tisiphona Duclos, 1844 (nomen dubium)
- Oliva todosina Duclos, 1835
- Oliva tremulina Lamarck, 1811
- Oliva tricolor Lamarck, 1811
- Oliva truncata Marrat, 1867
- Oliva undatella Lamarck, 1811
- Oliva venulata Lamarck, 1811
- Oliva vicdani da Motta, 1982
- Oliva vicweei Recourt, 1989
- Oliva vidua (Röding, 1798)
- Oliva violacea Marrat, 1867
- Oliva westralis Petuch & Sargent, 1986
- Oliva weyderti Rosso, 1985
- Oliva xenos Petuch & Sargent, 1986

== Gallery ==
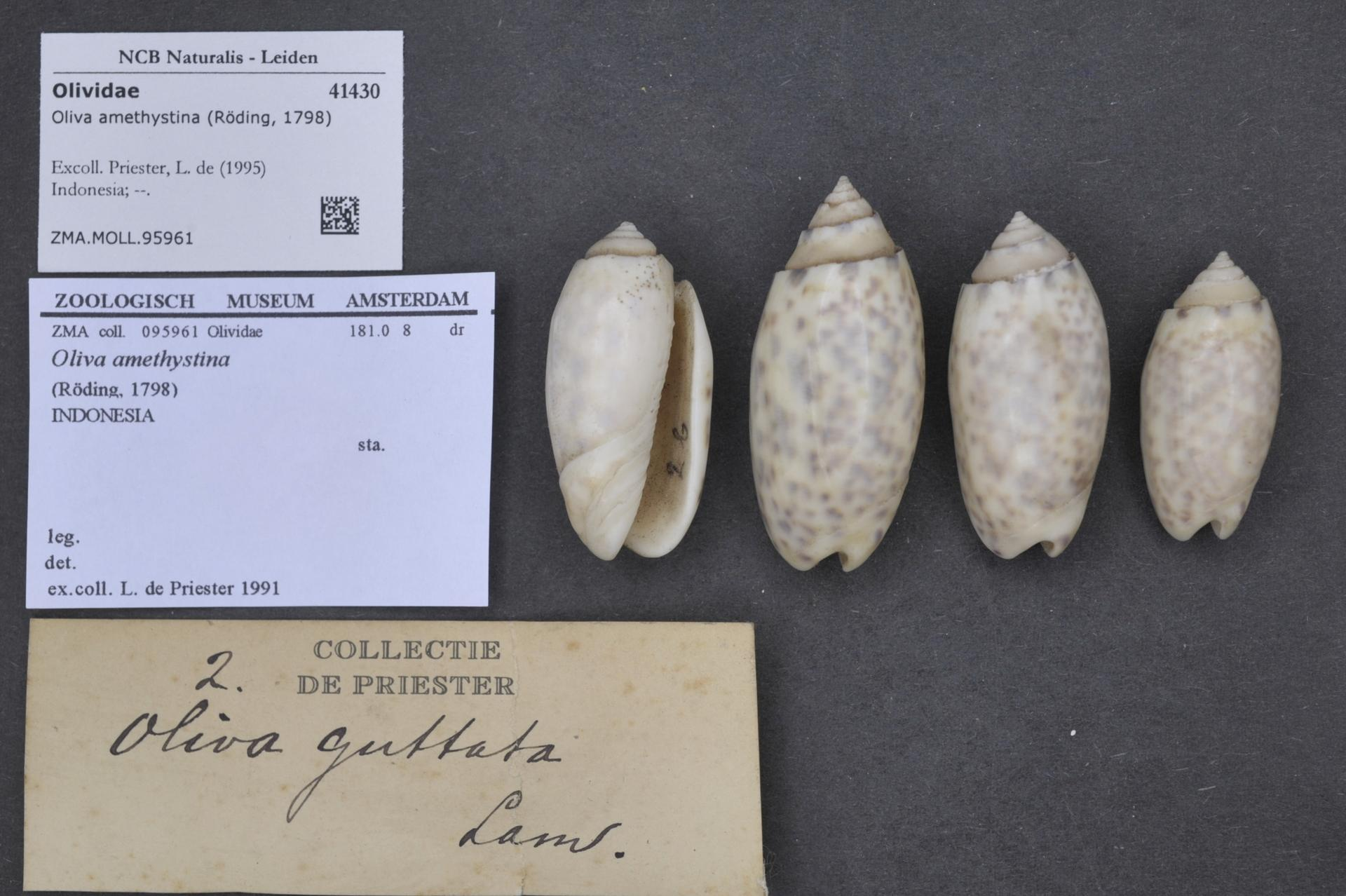
Oliva amethystina

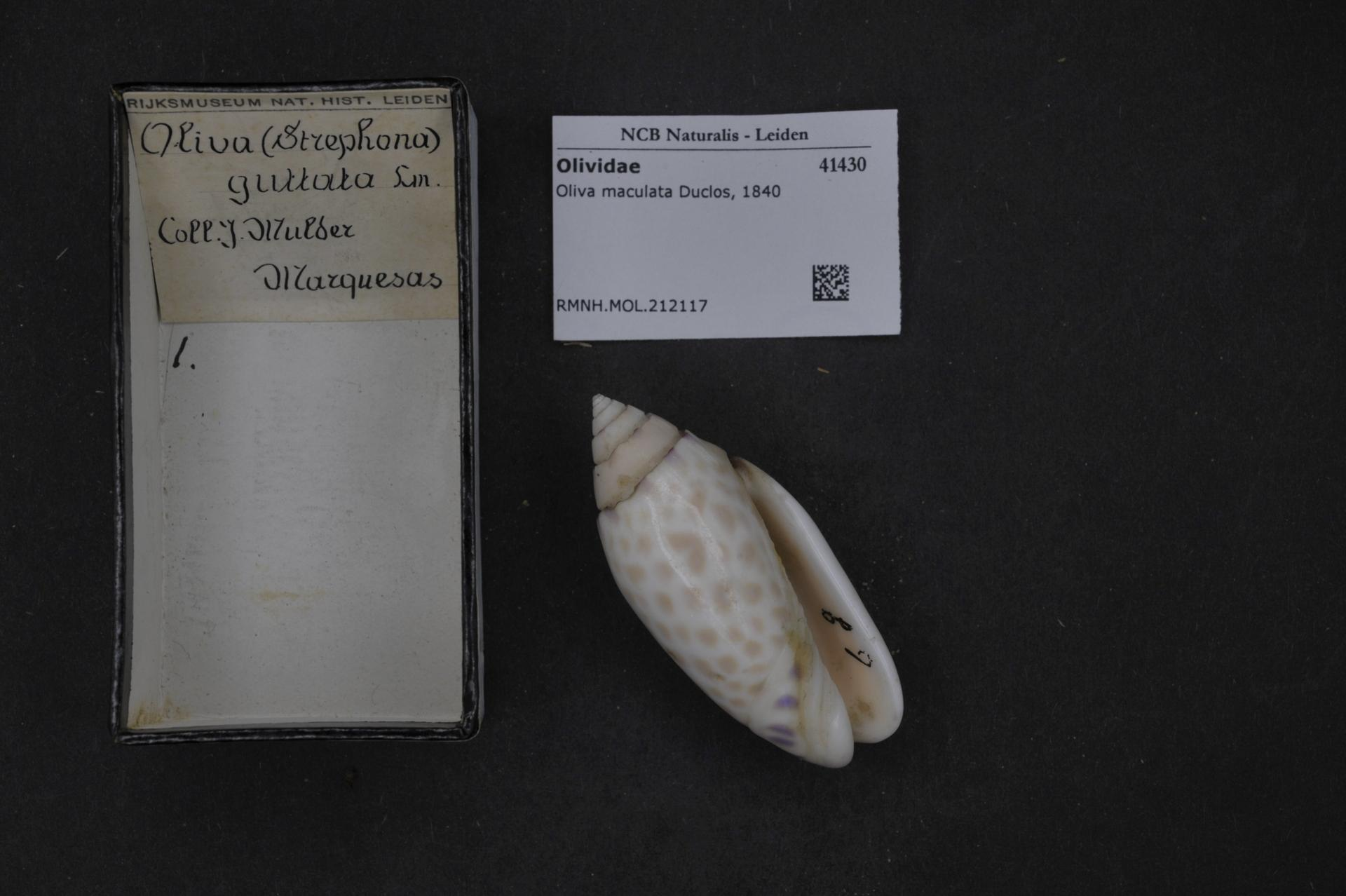
Oliva amethystina guttata

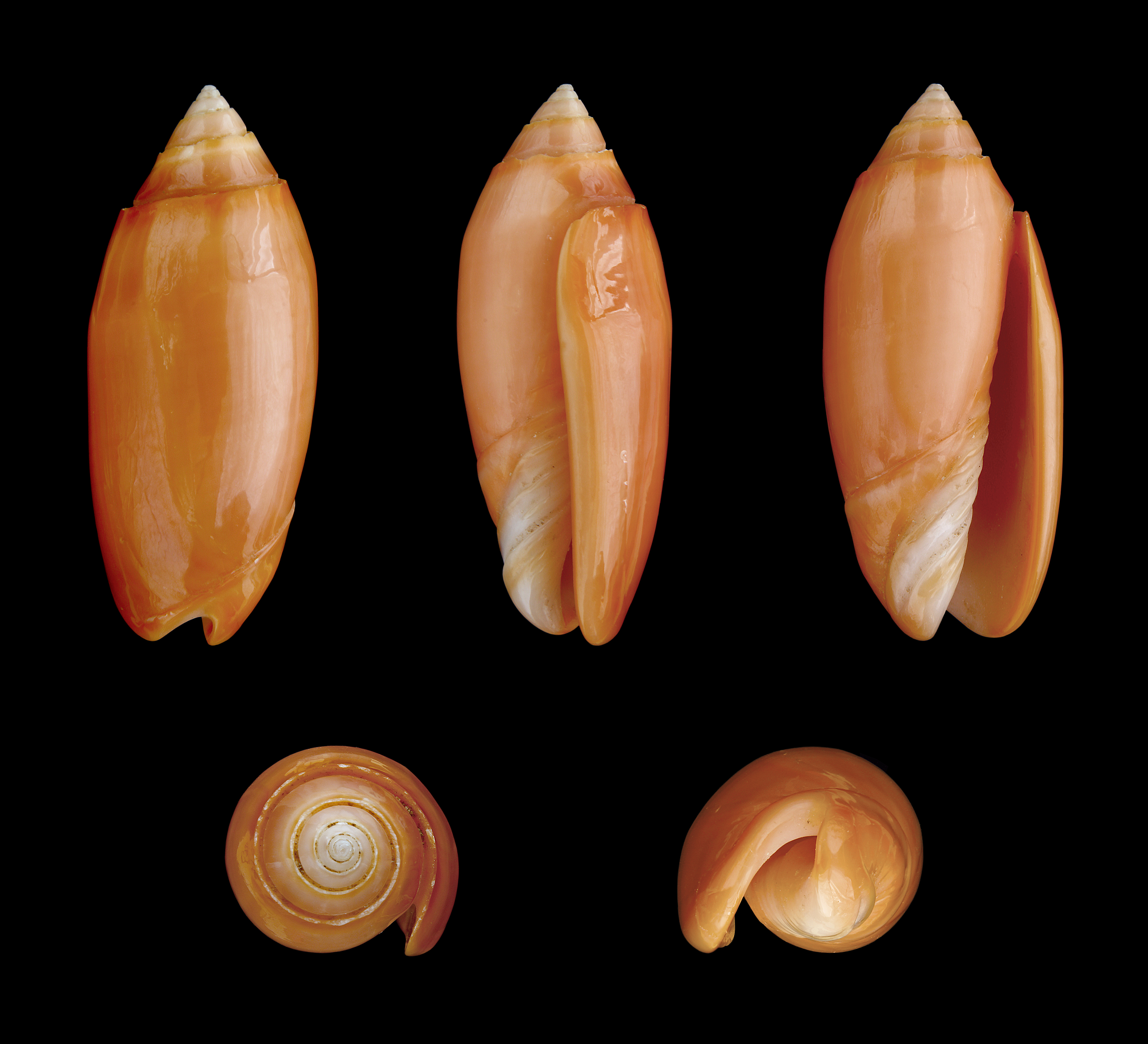
Oliva annulata f. carnicolor

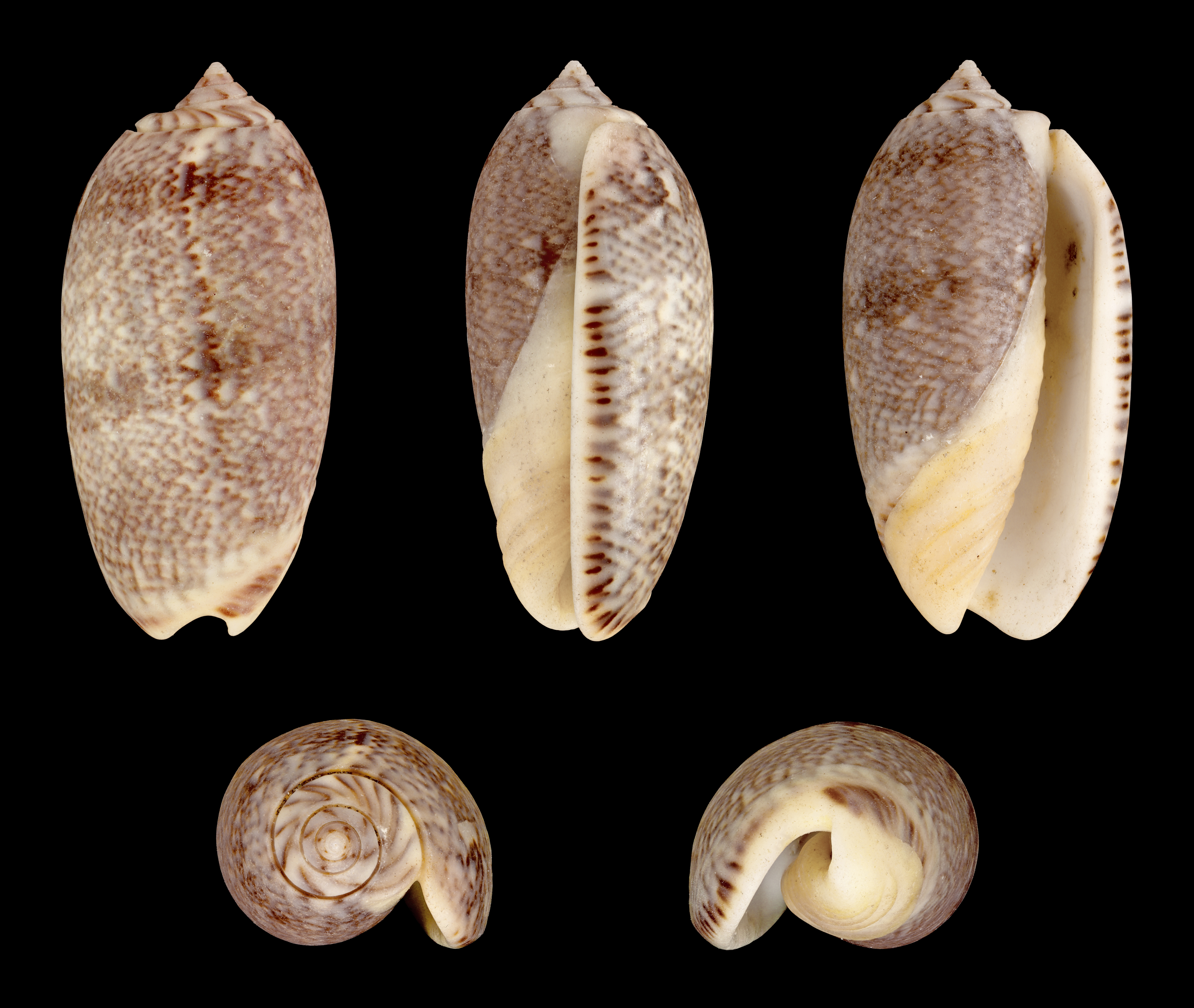
Oliva bulbiformis

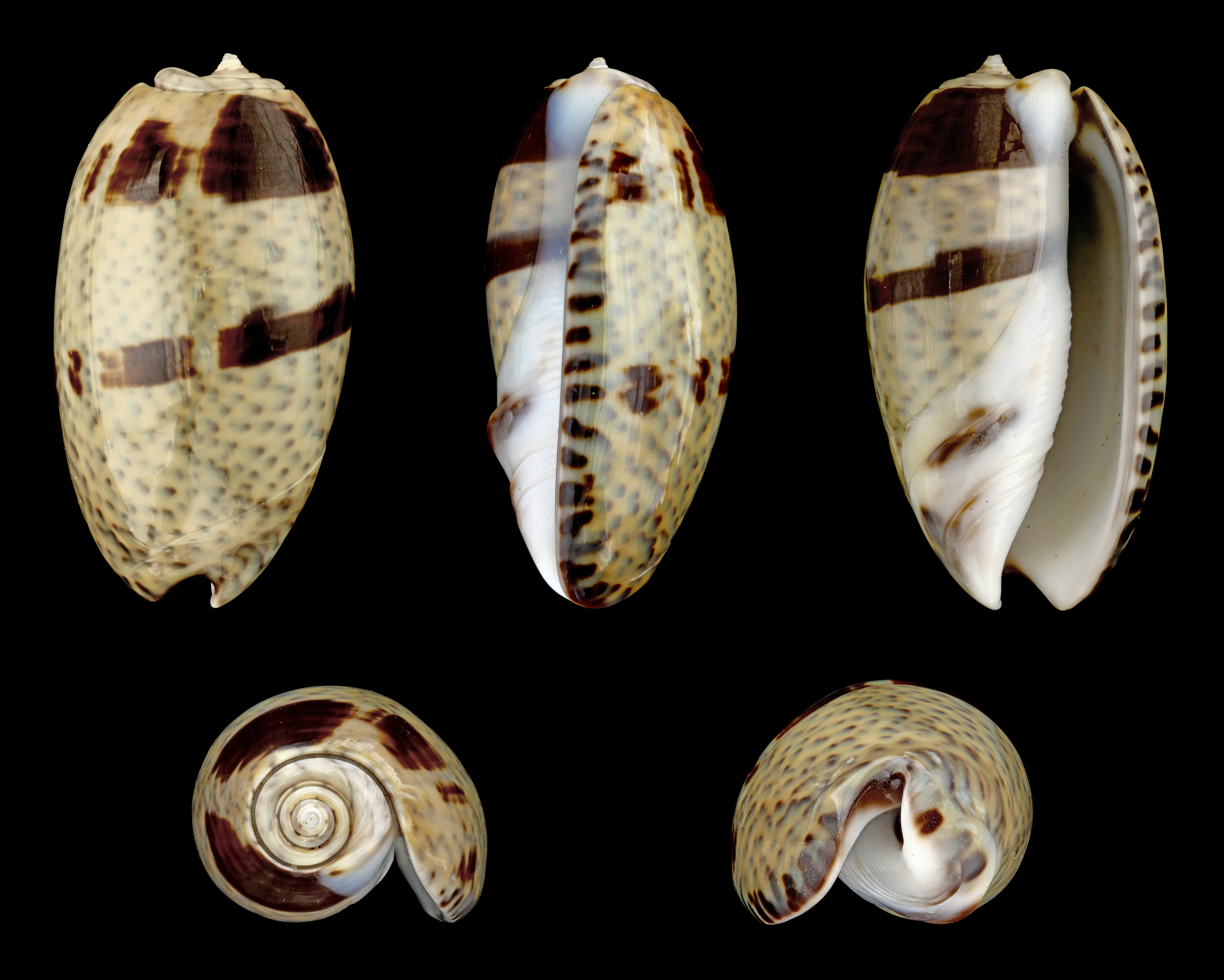
Oliva bulbosa forma bicingulata

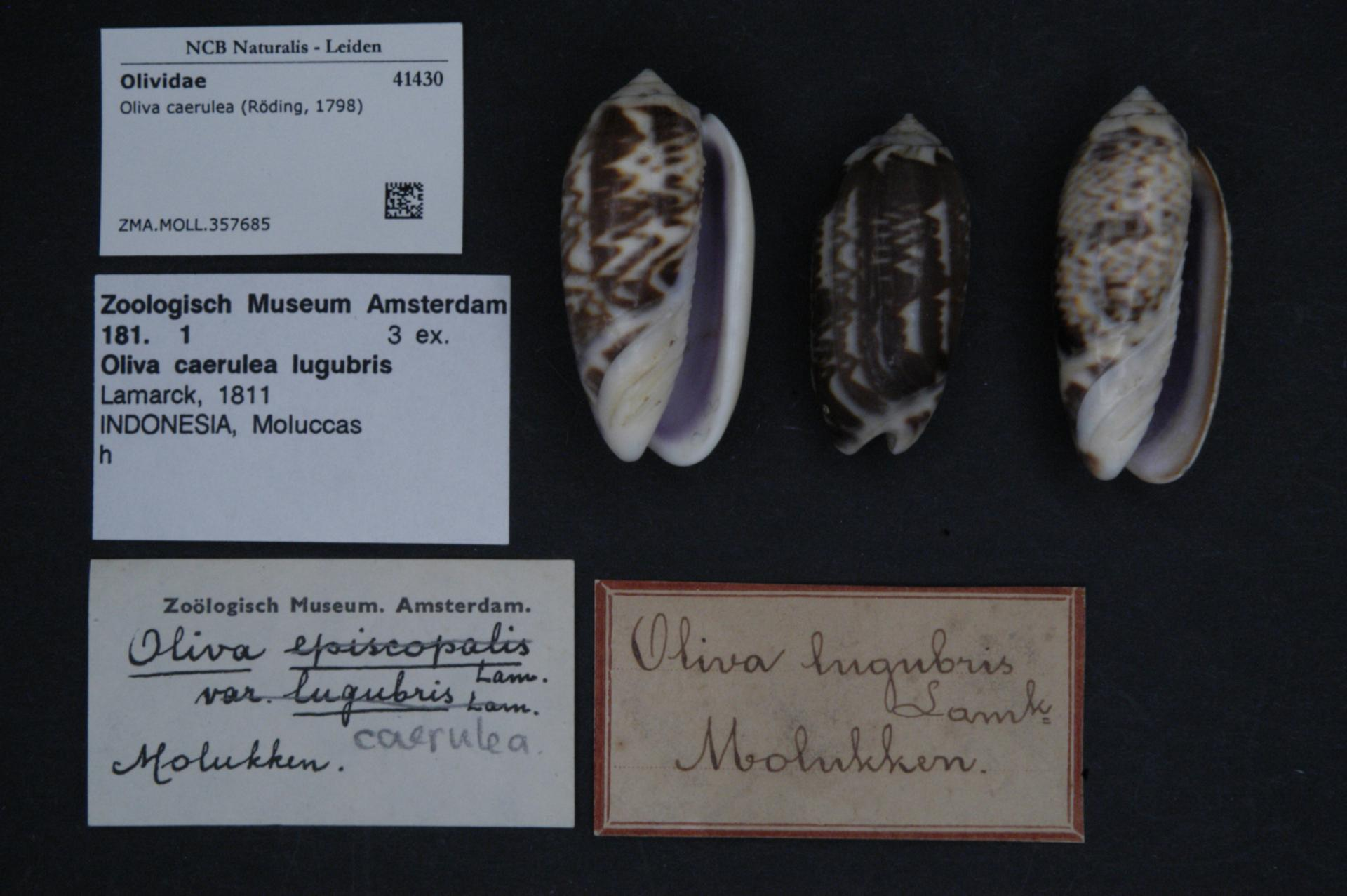
Oliva caerulea

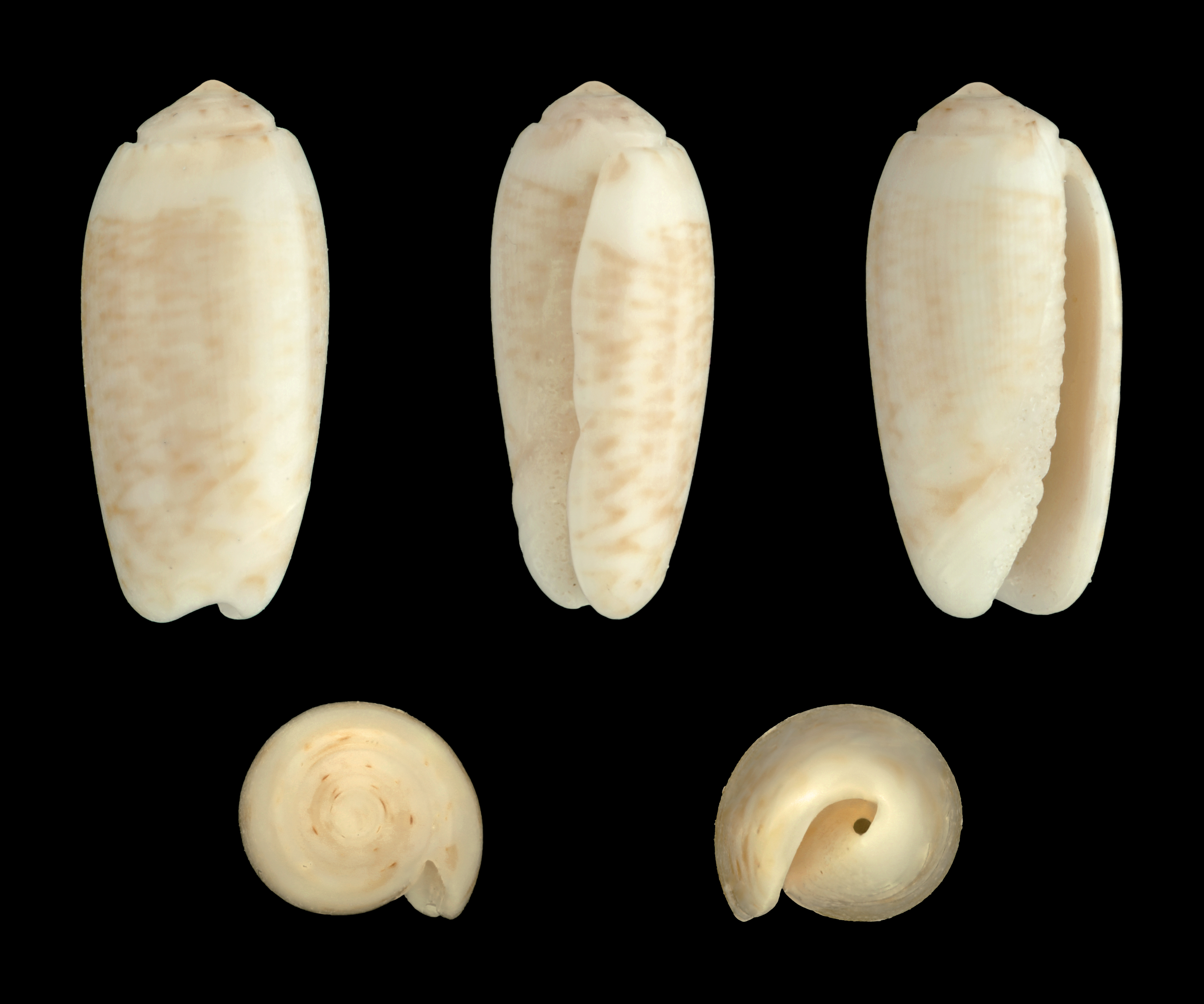
Oliva carneola forma andamanensis

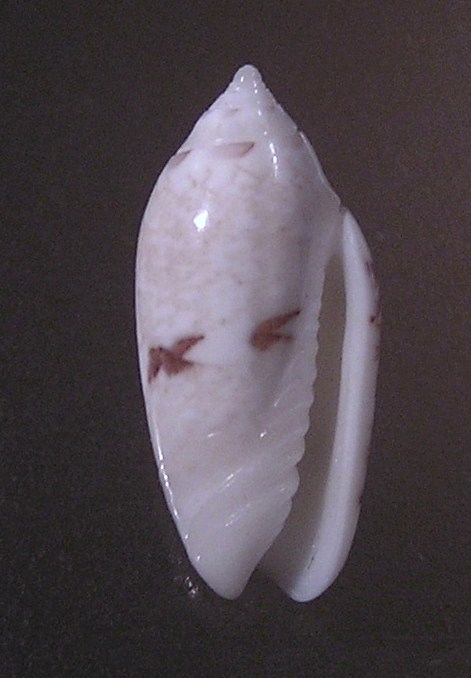
Oliva chrysoplecta

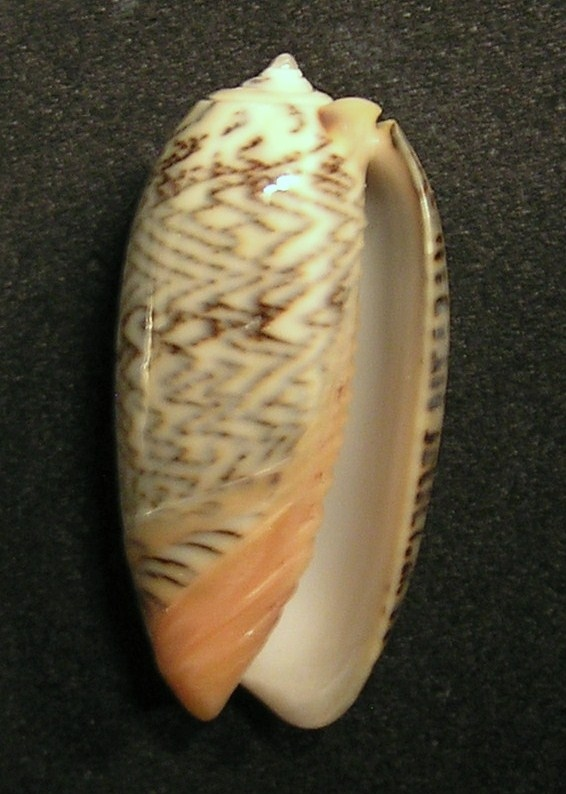
Oliva elegans zigzag

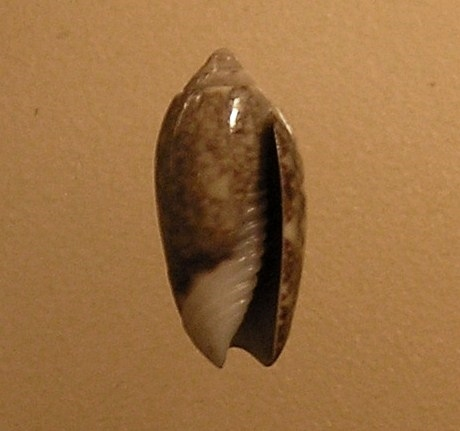
Oliva faba

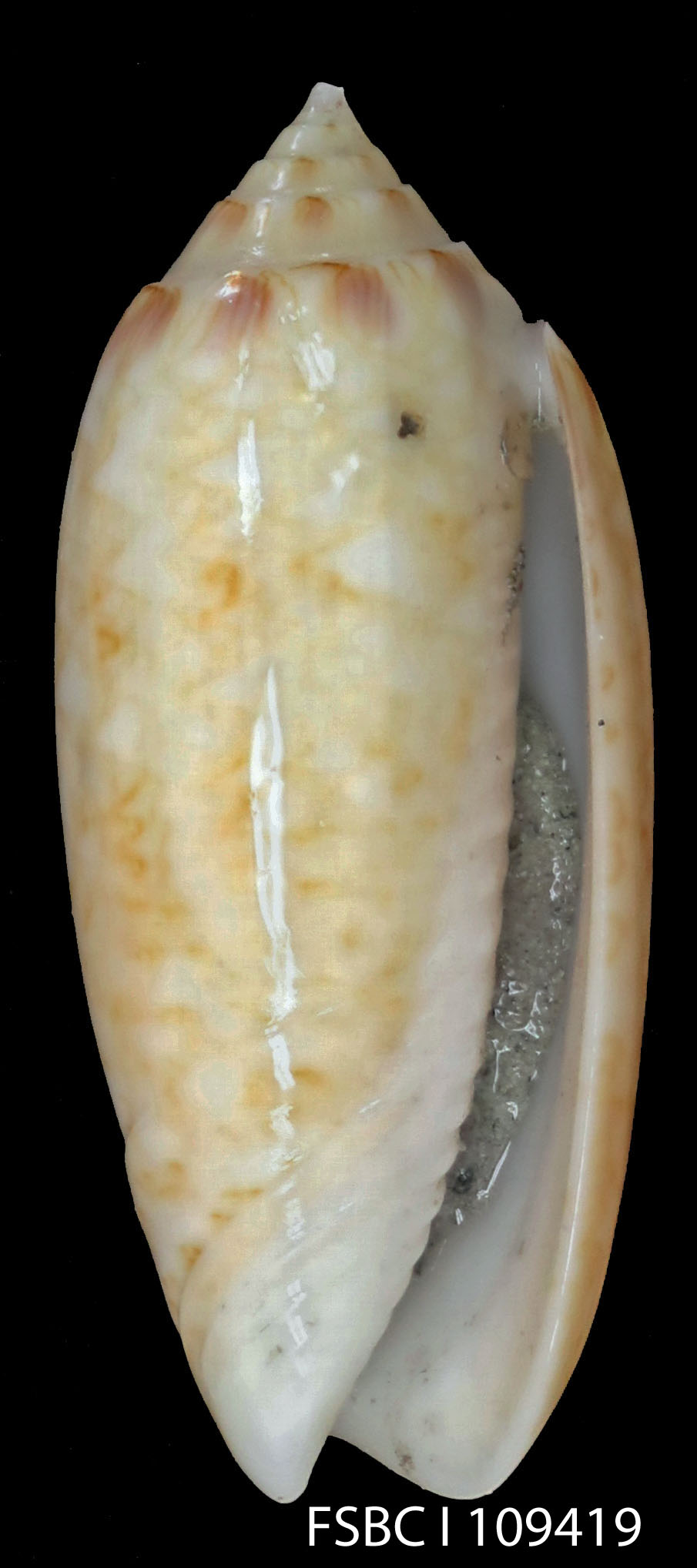
Oliva fulgurator

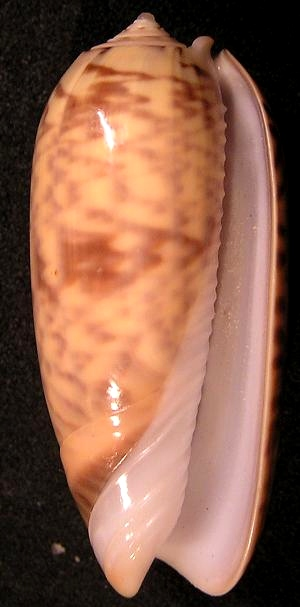
Oliva hirasei

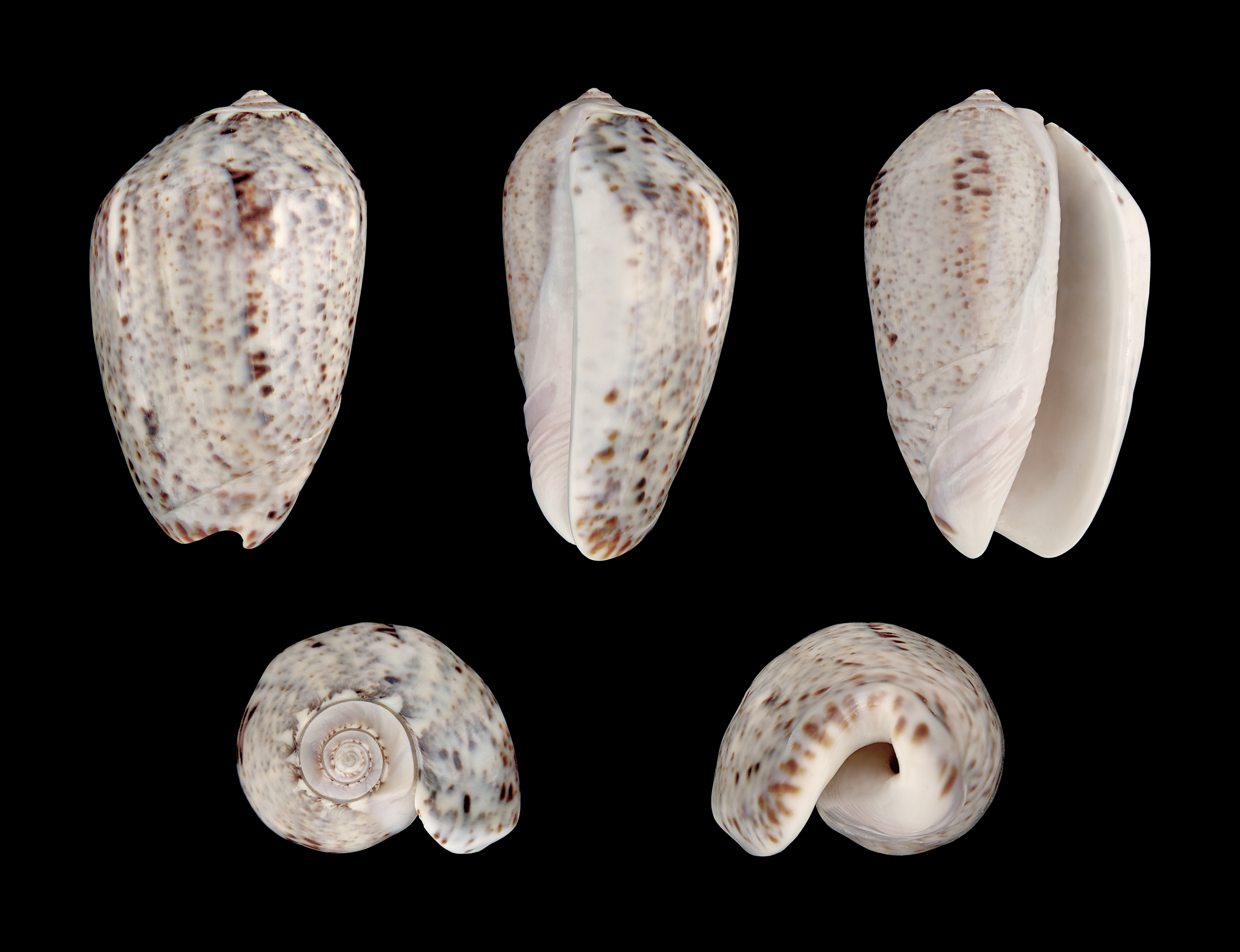
Oliva incrassata

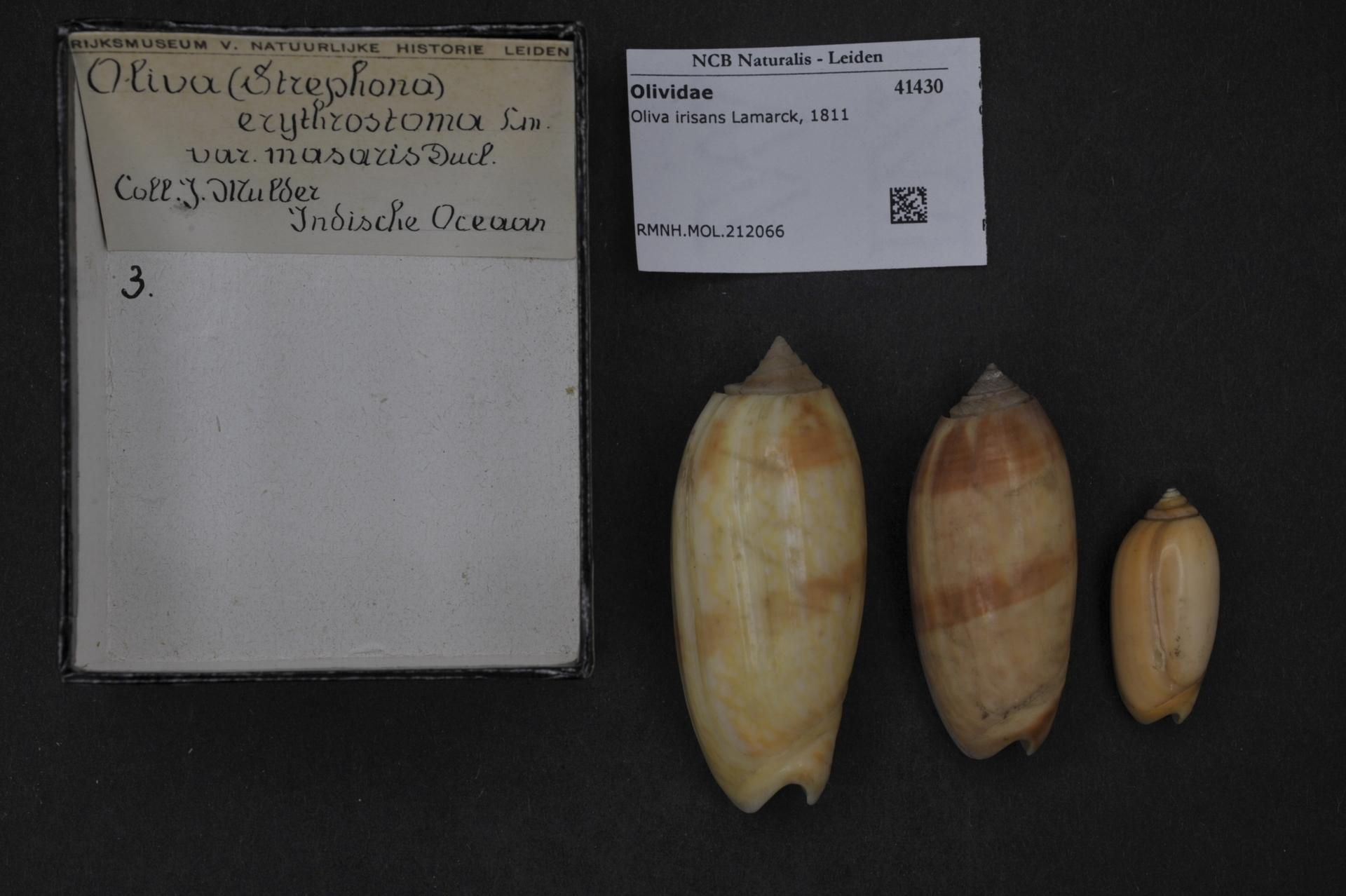
Oliva irisans

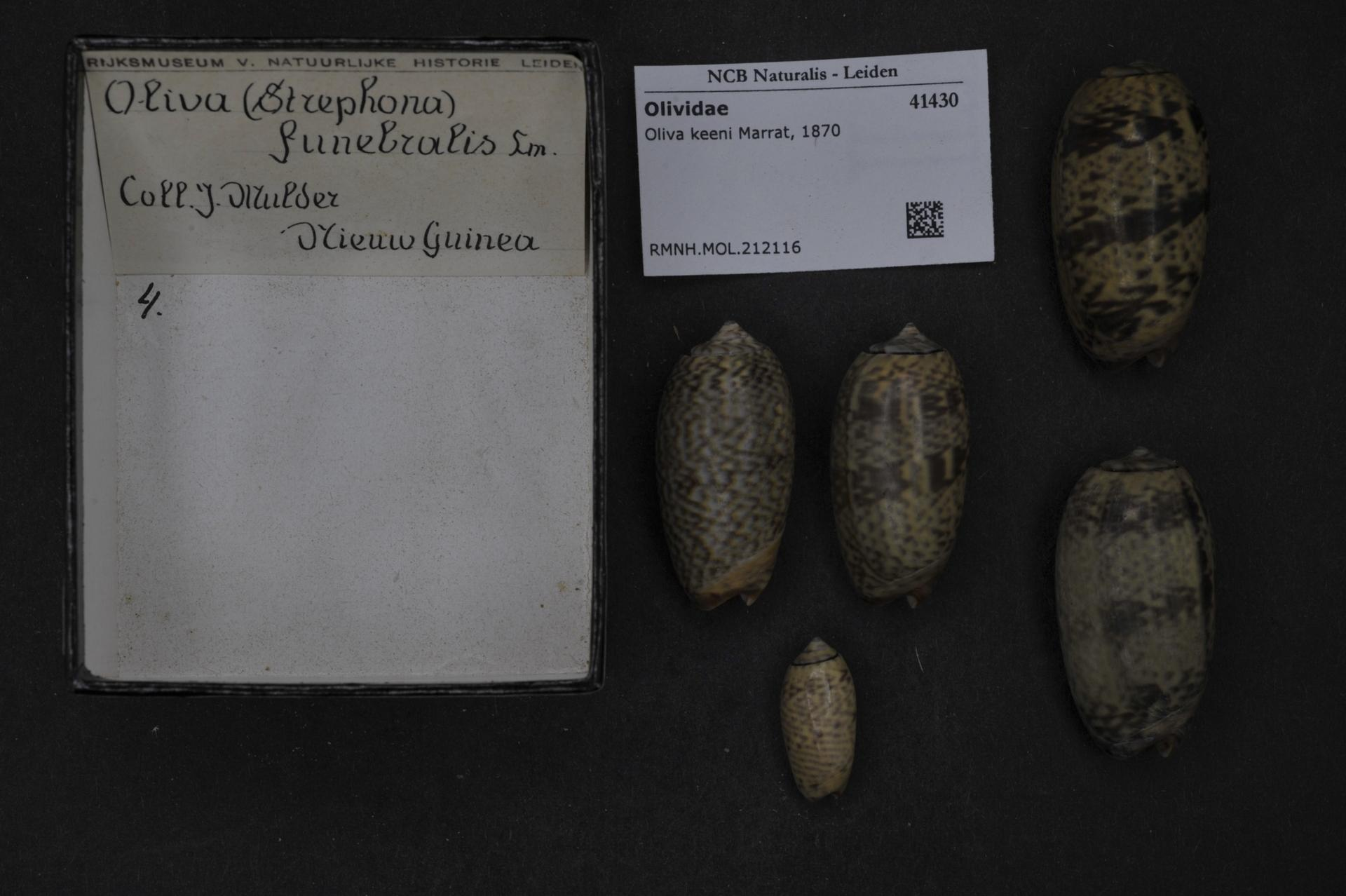
Oliva keenii

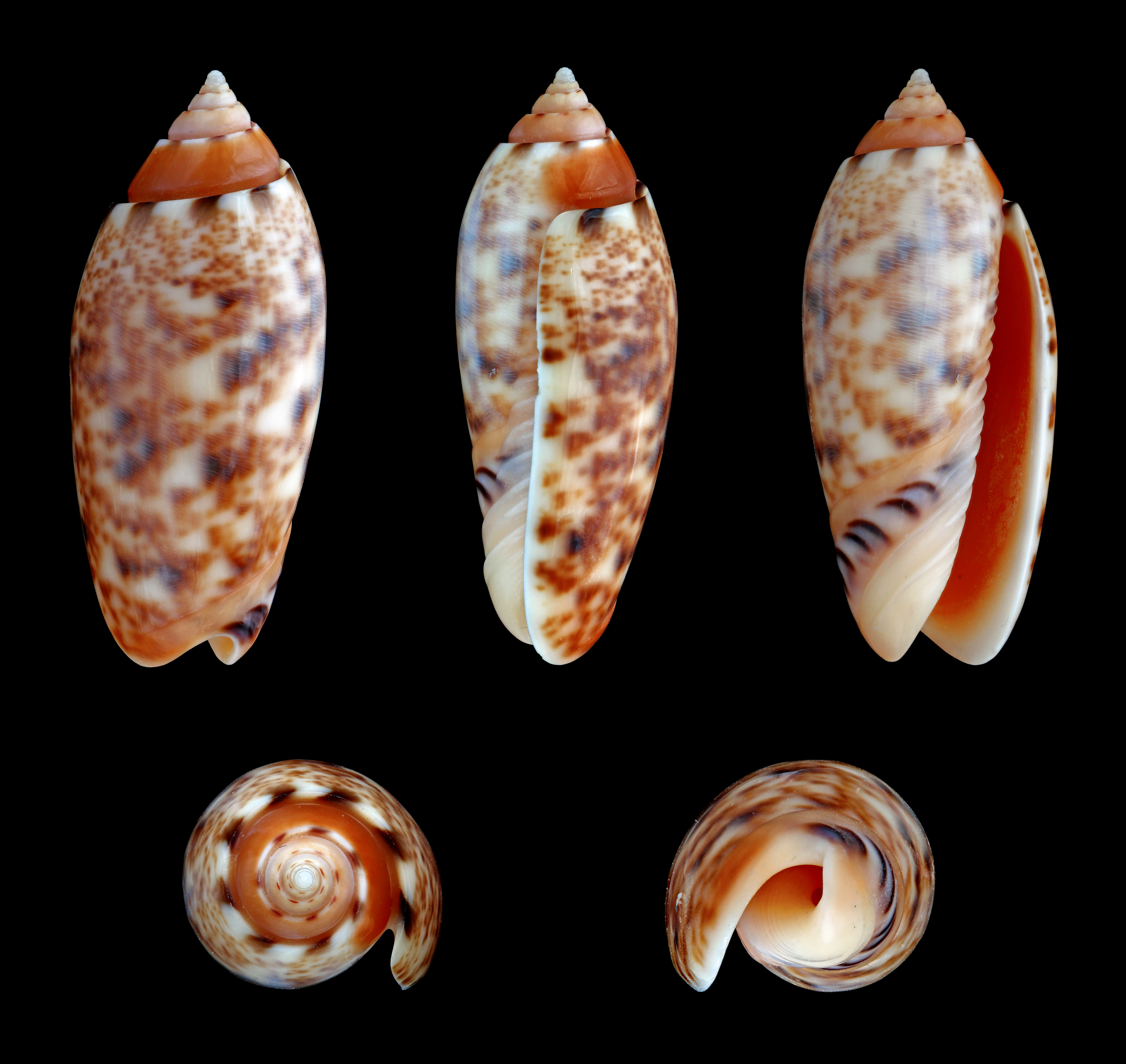
Oliva mantichora

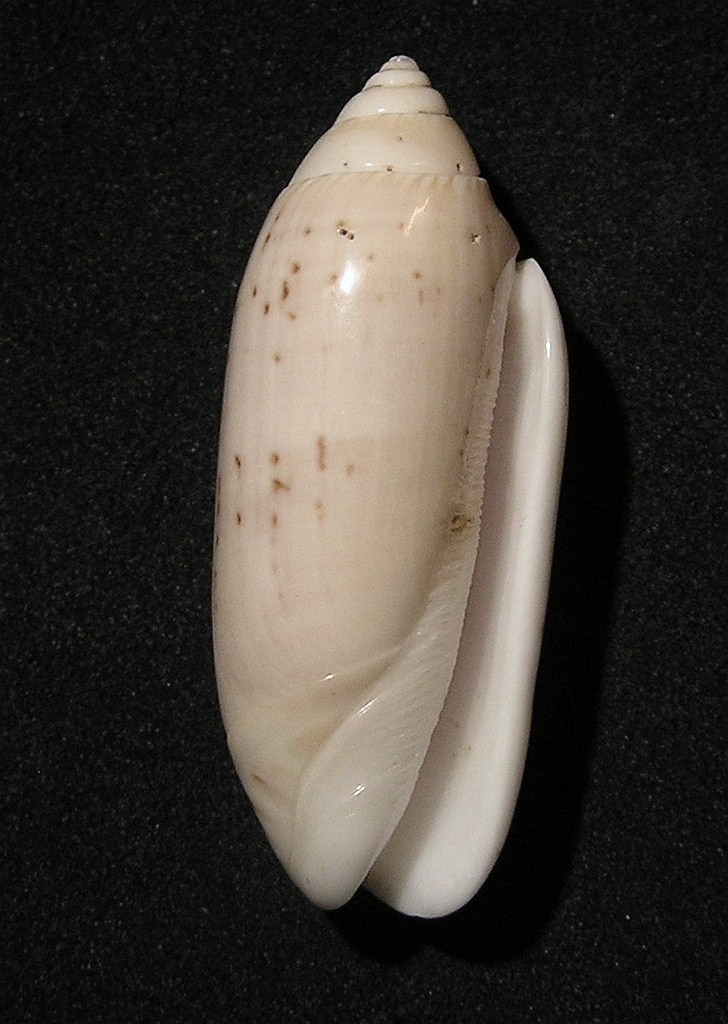
Oliva multiplicata

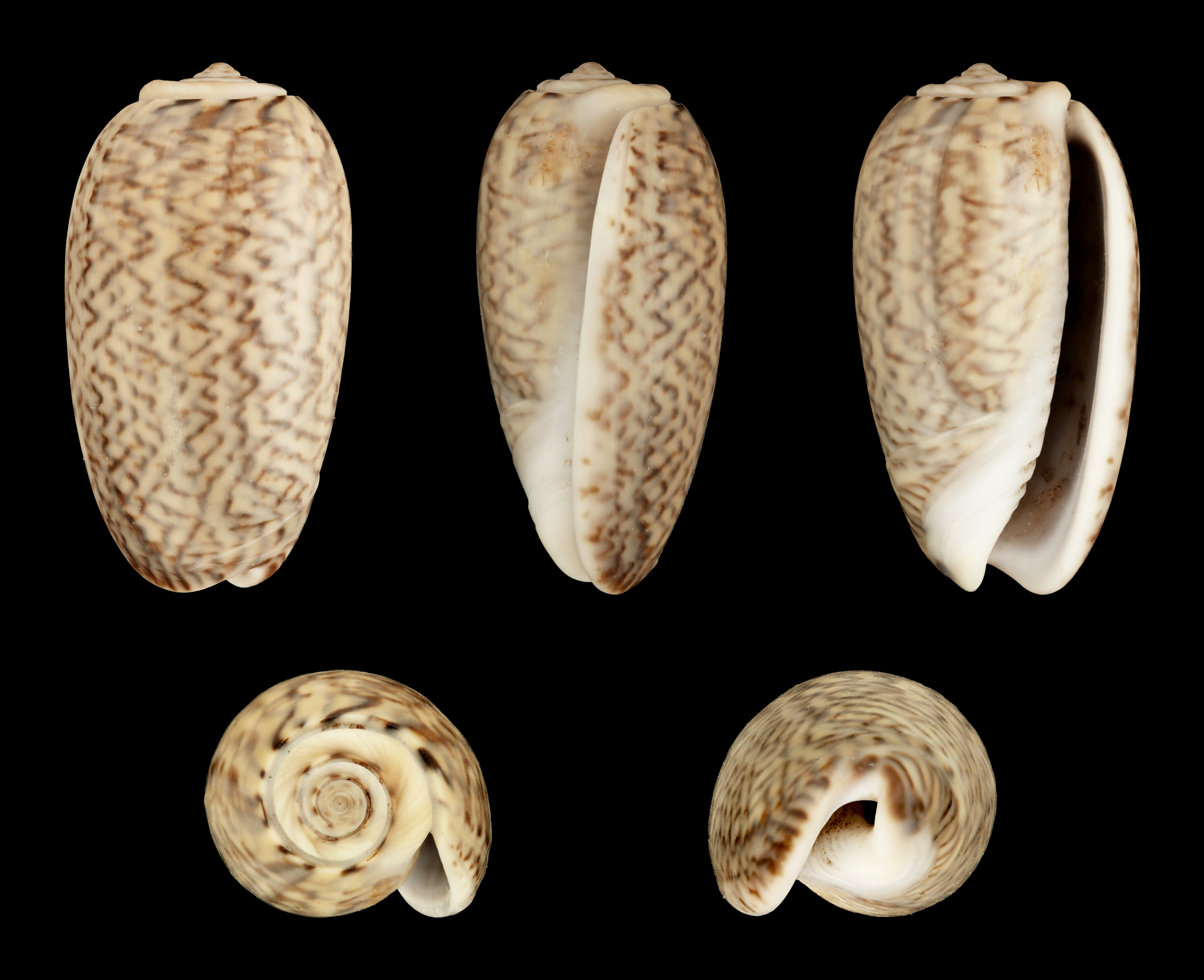
Oliva mustelina

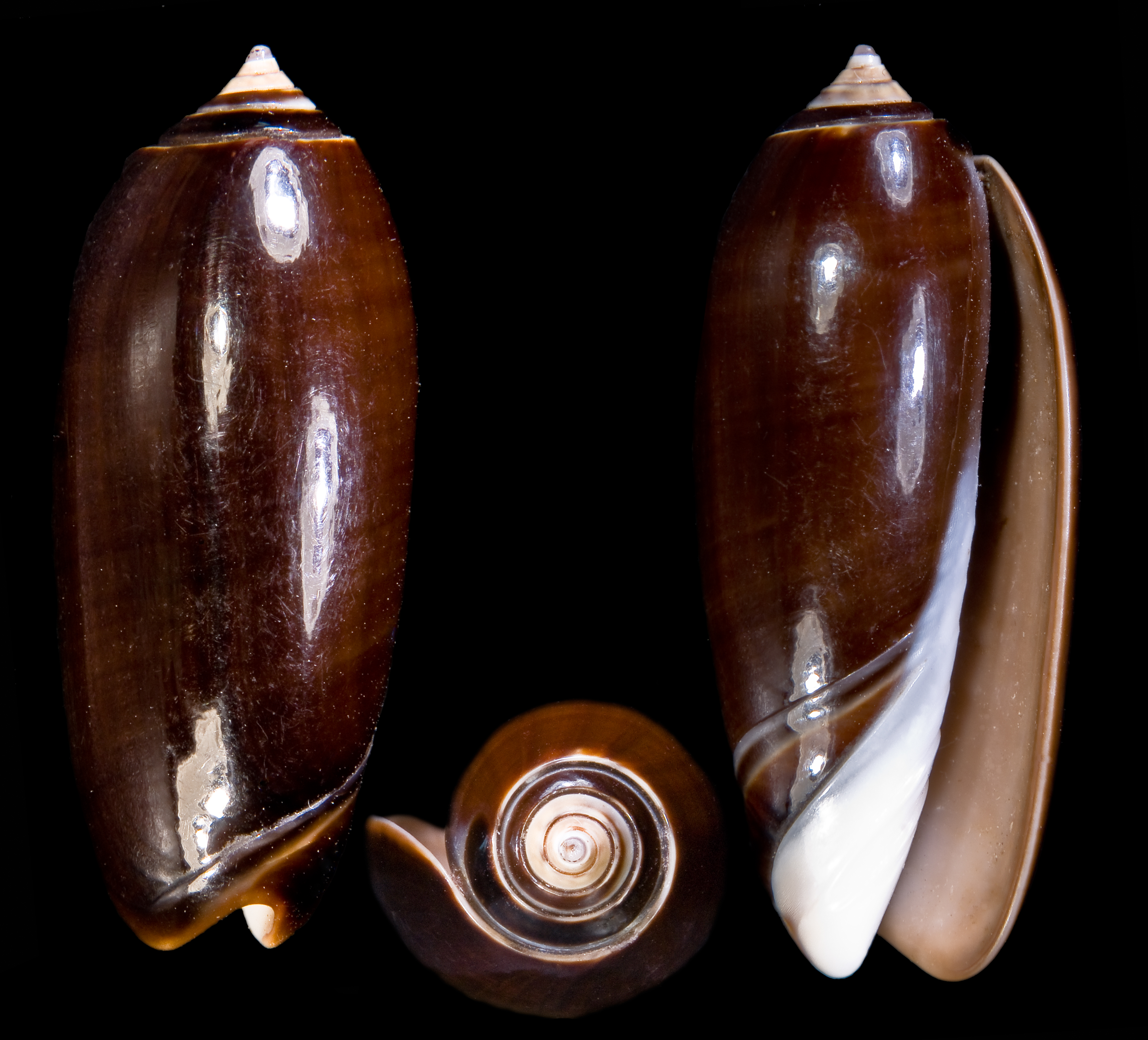
Oliva oliva

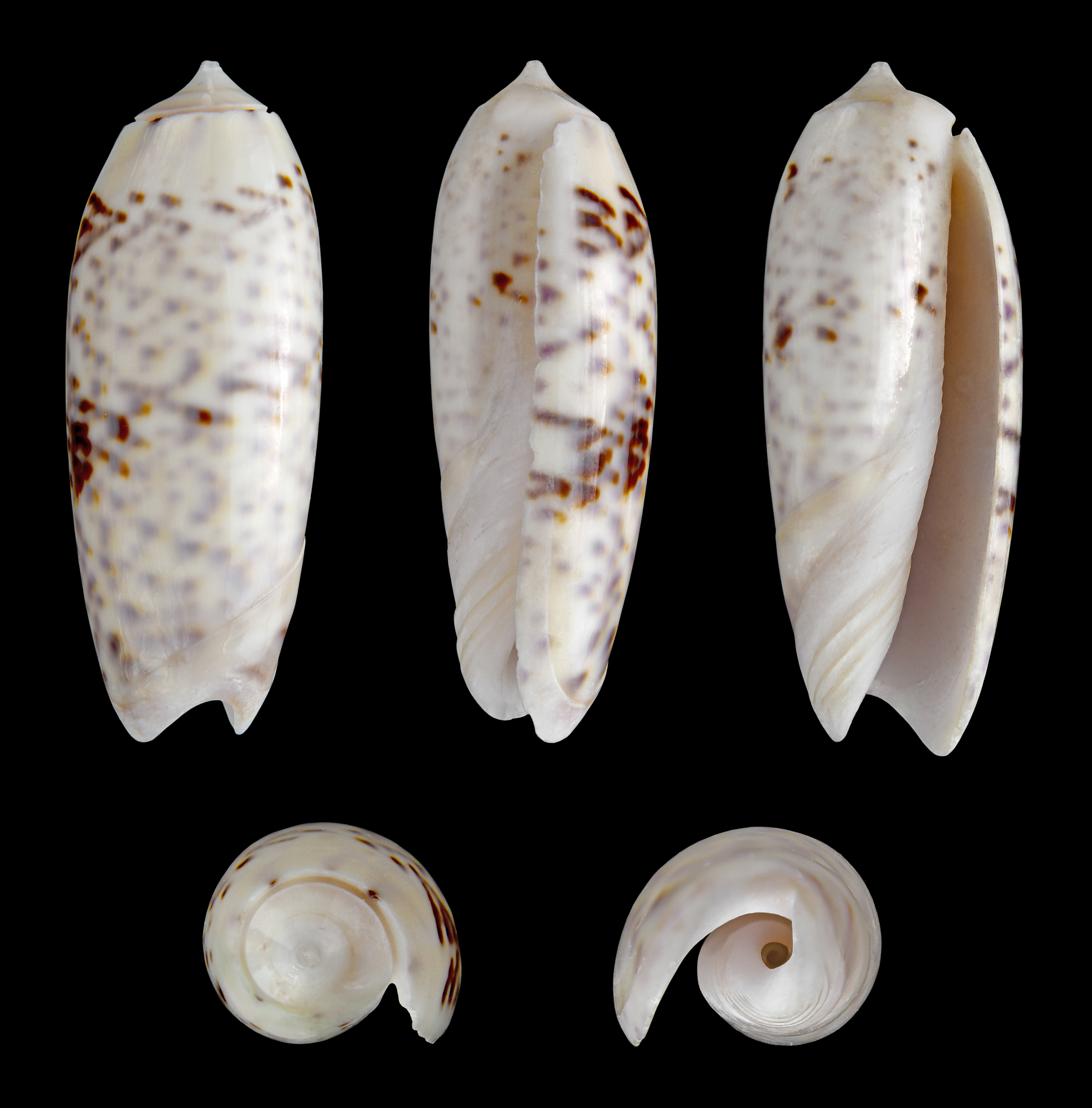
Oliva ornata

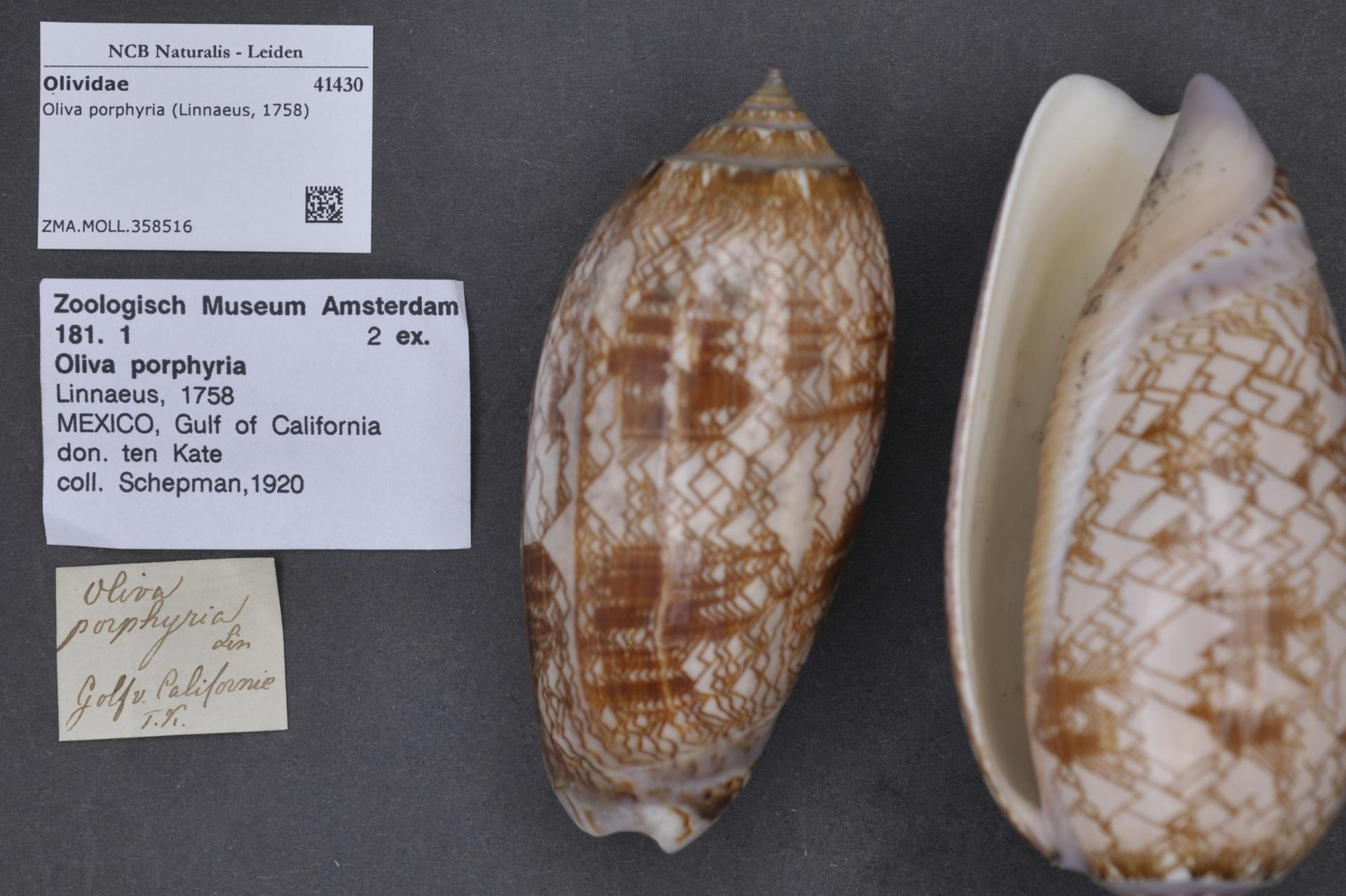
Oliva porphyria (mimetic of Conus sp.)

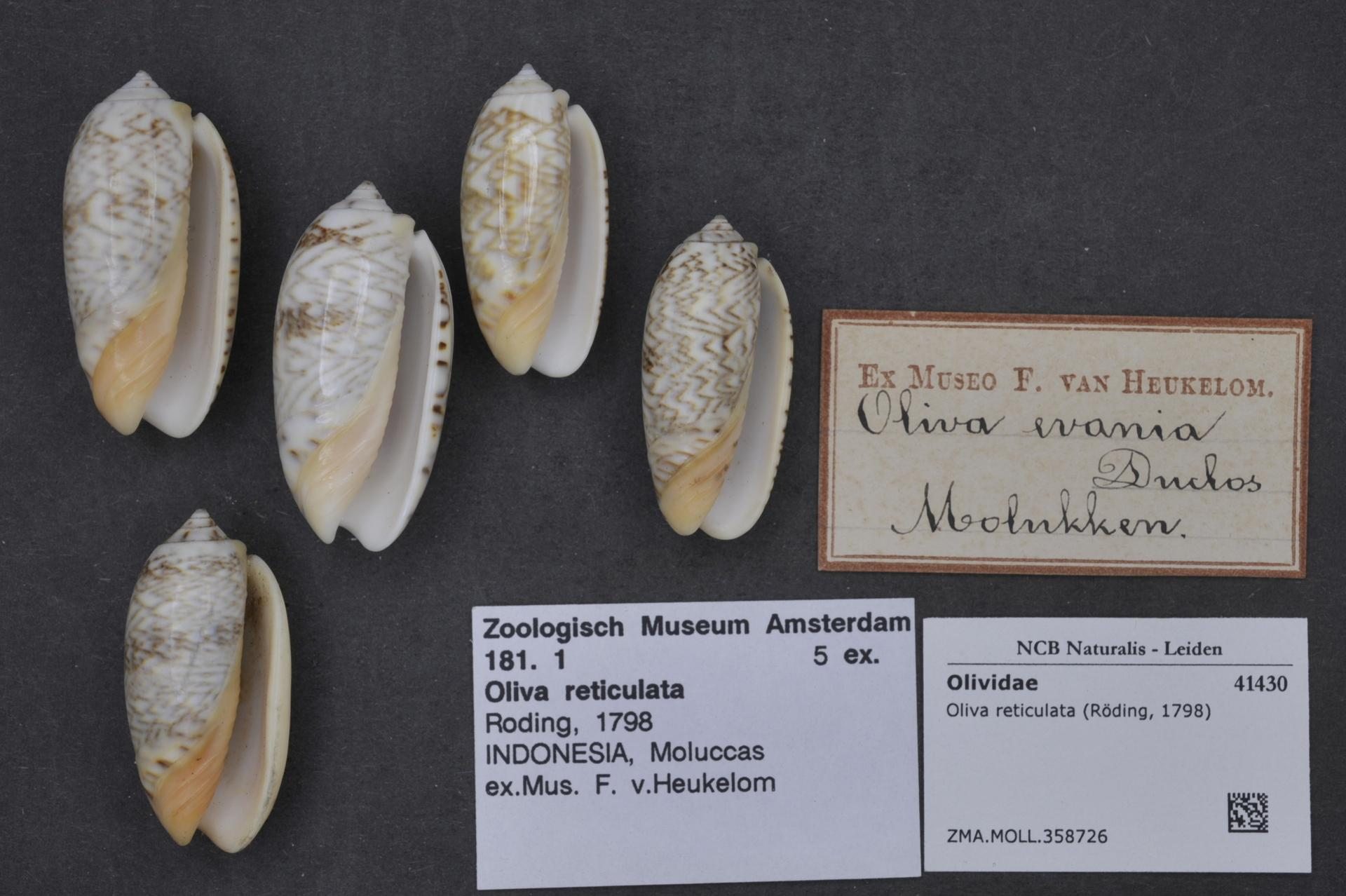
Oliva reticulata

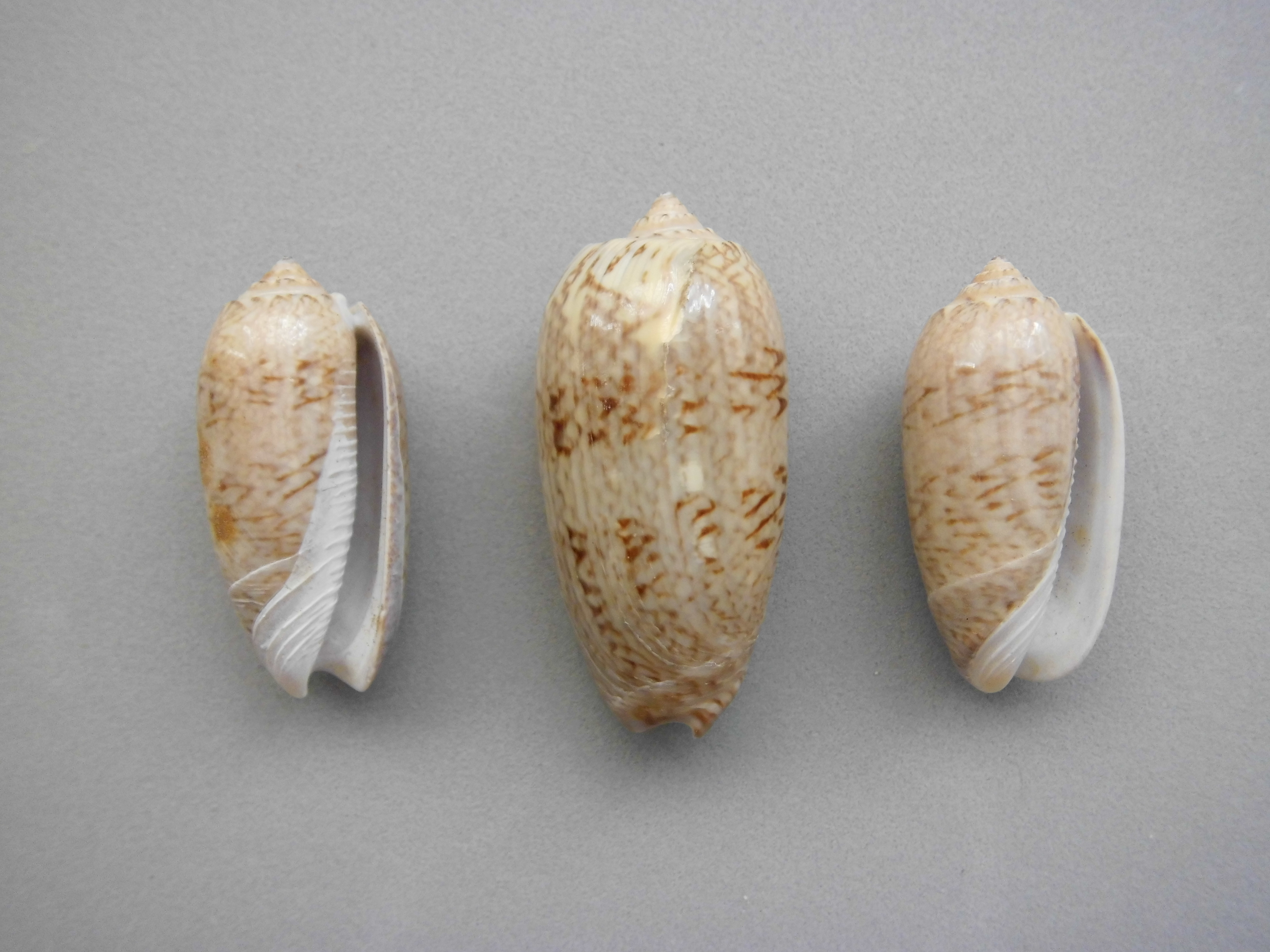
Oliva scripta scripta

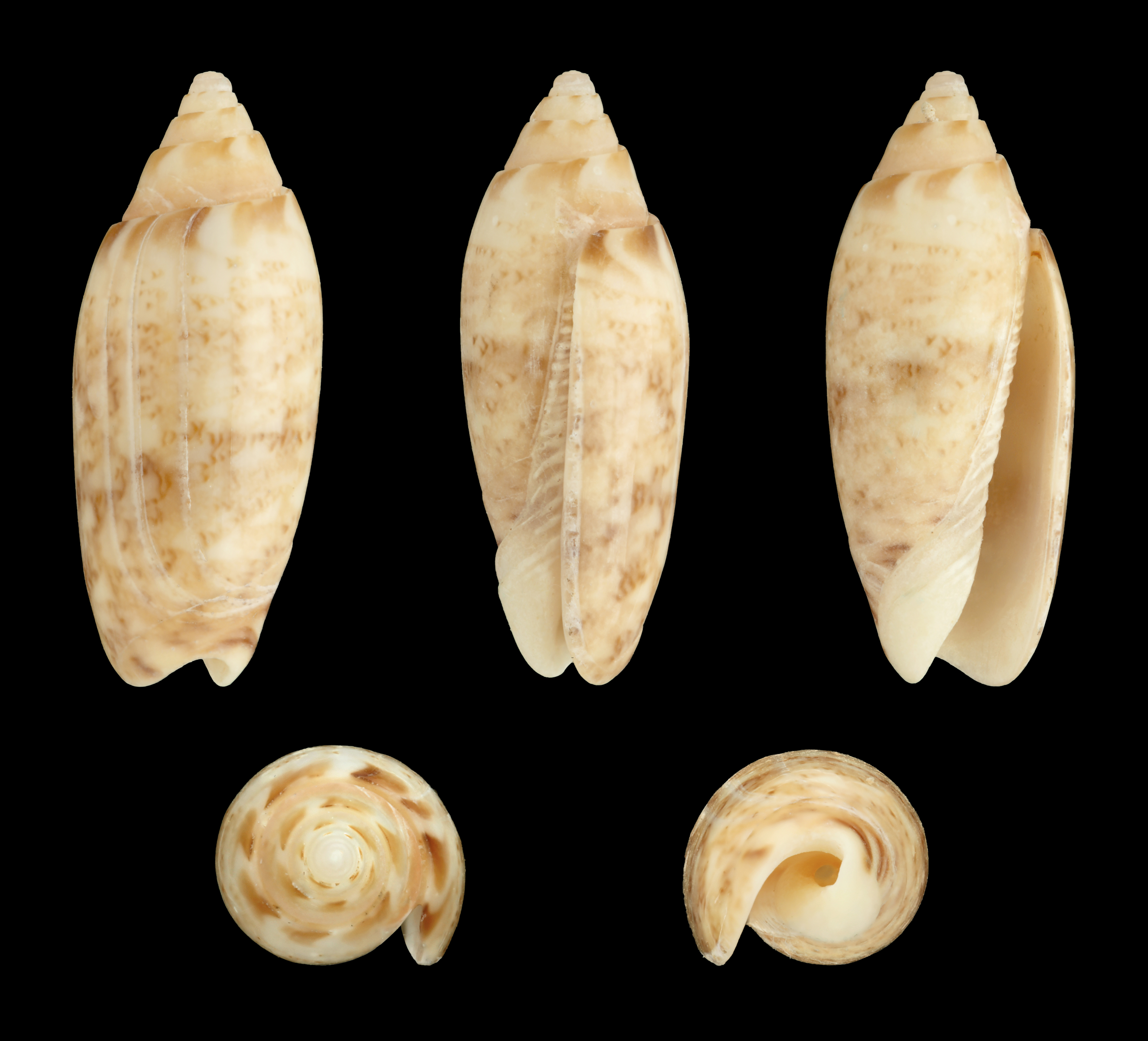
Oliva semmelinki

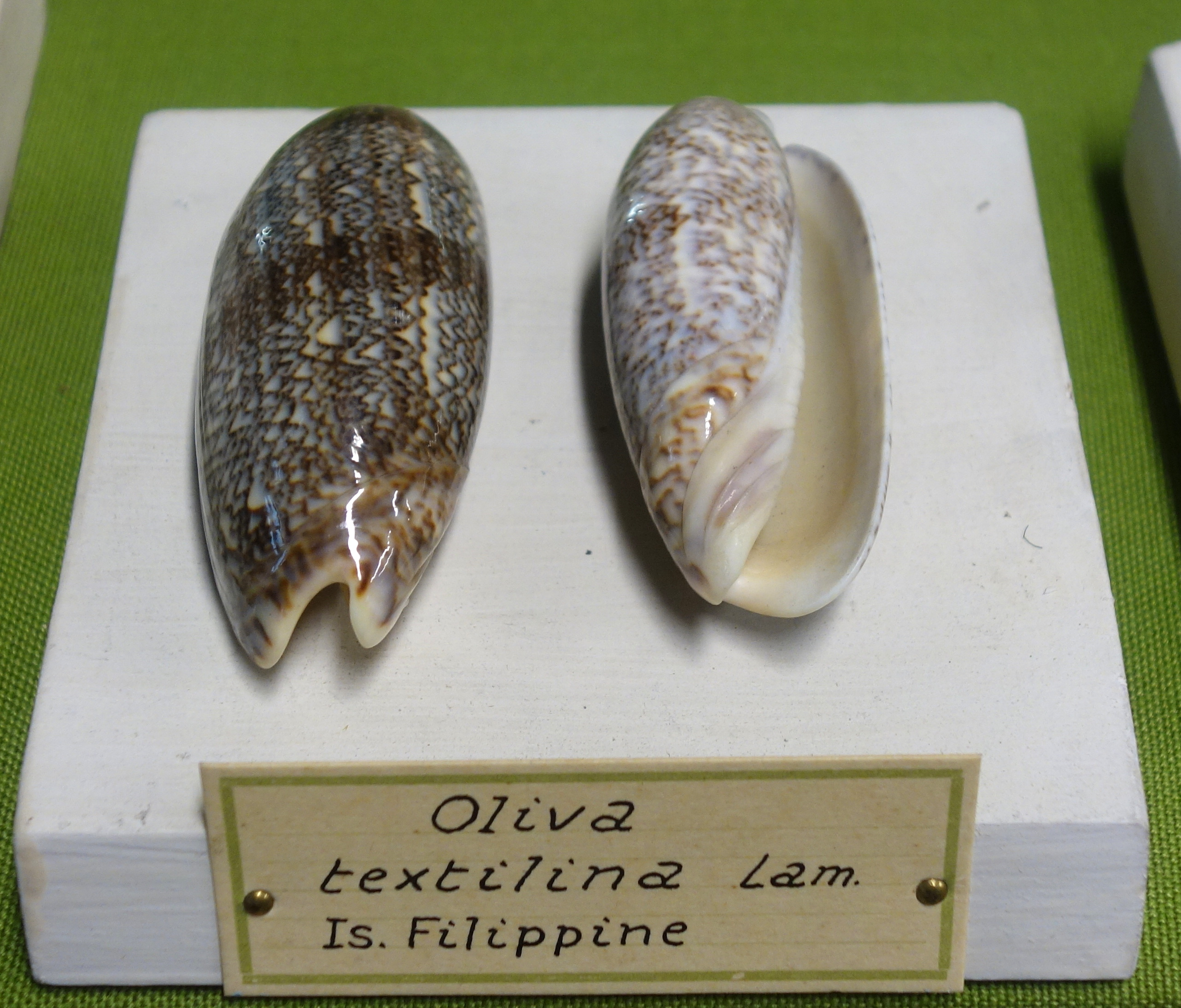
Oliva sericea

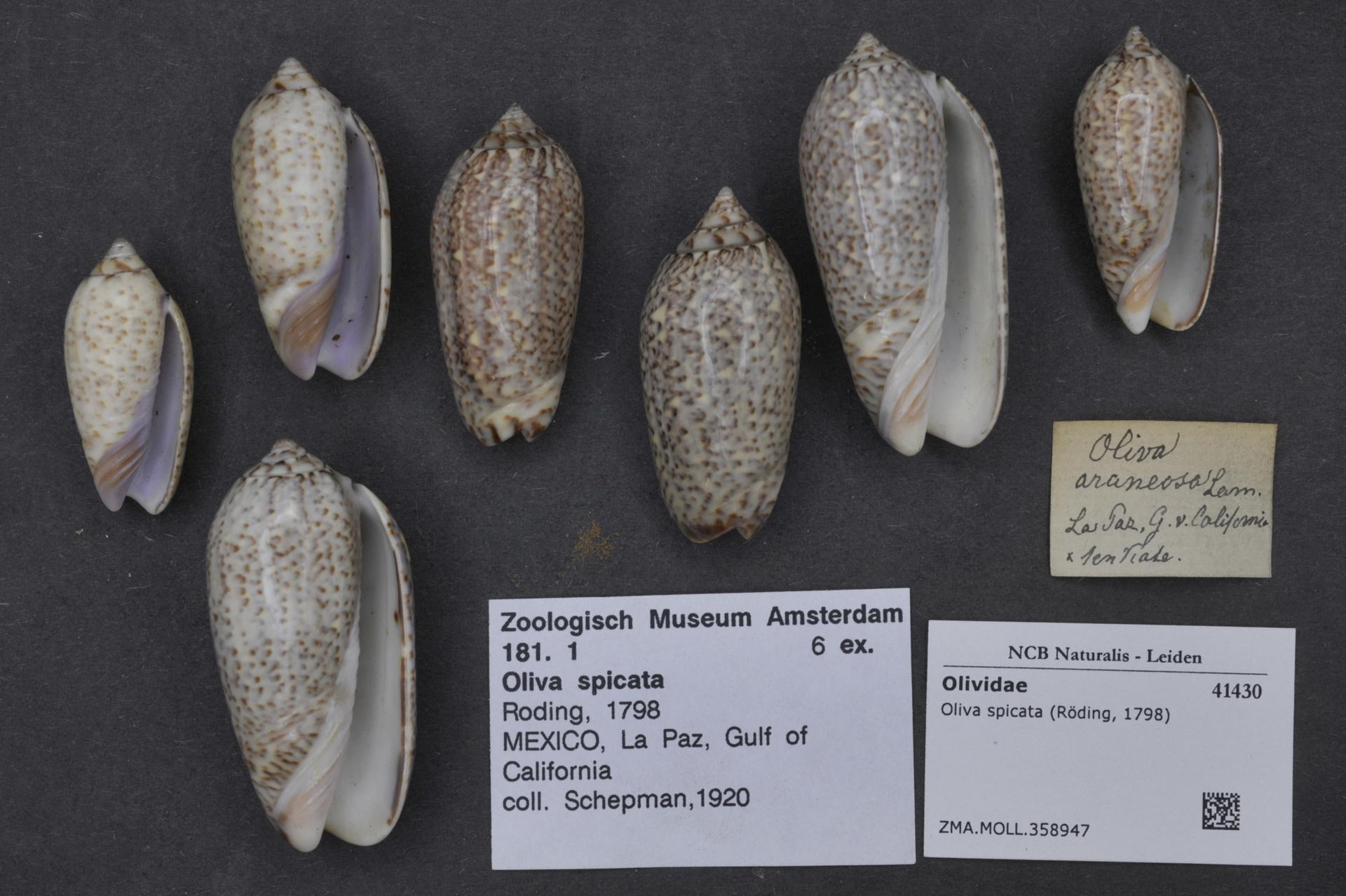
Oliva spicata

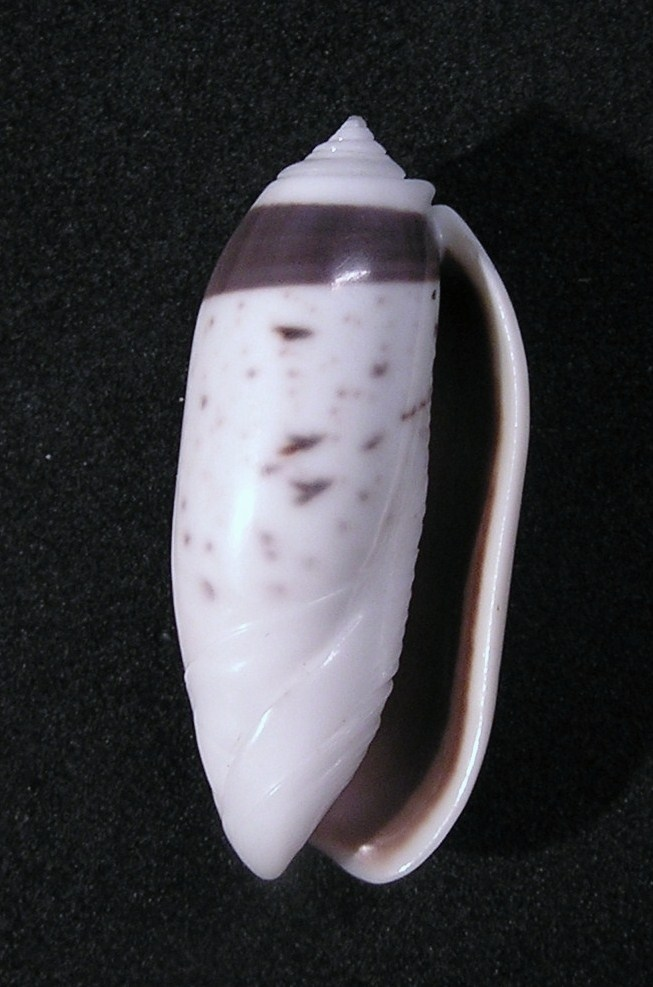
Oliva tigridella stellata

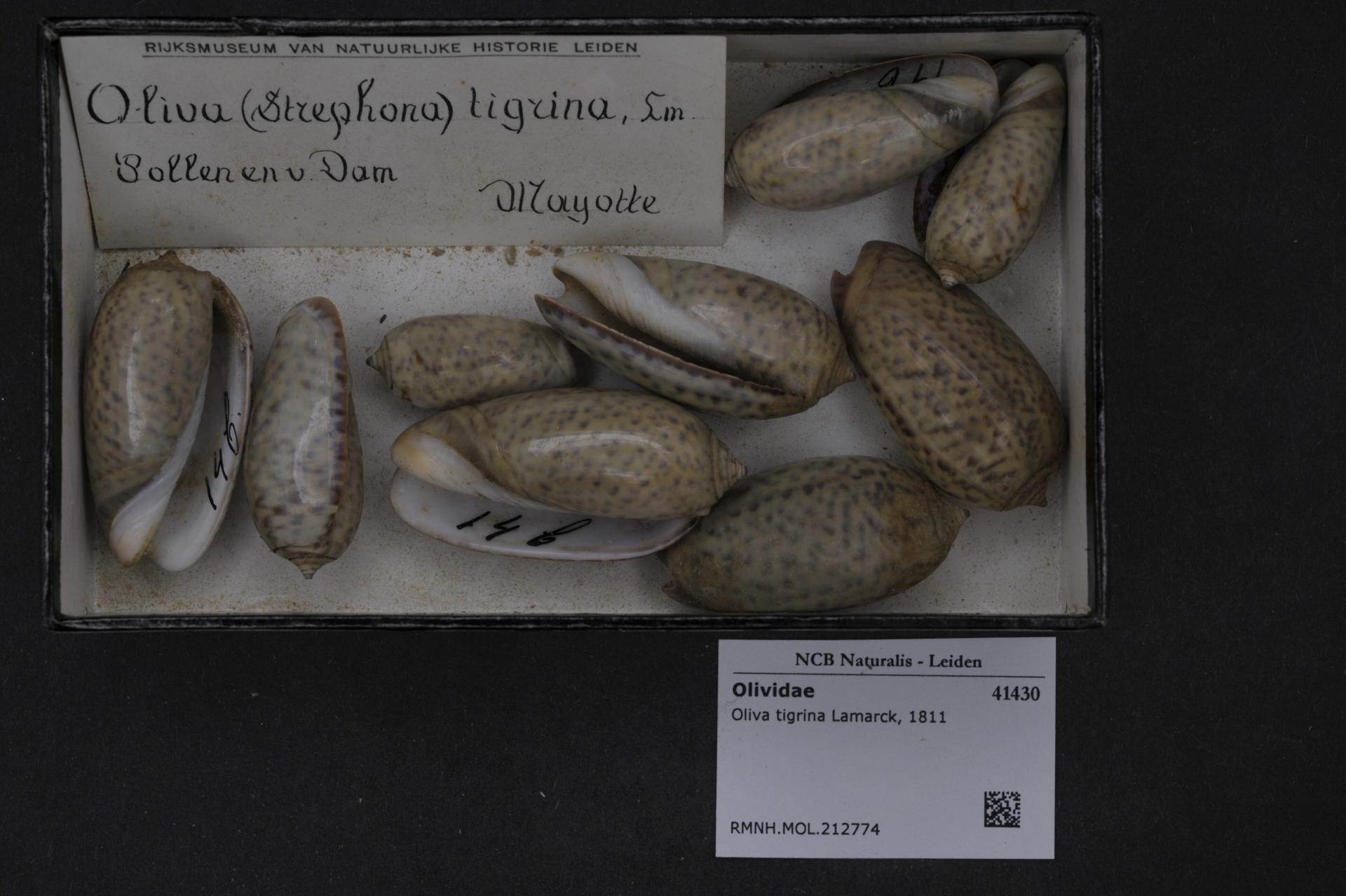
Oliva tigrina

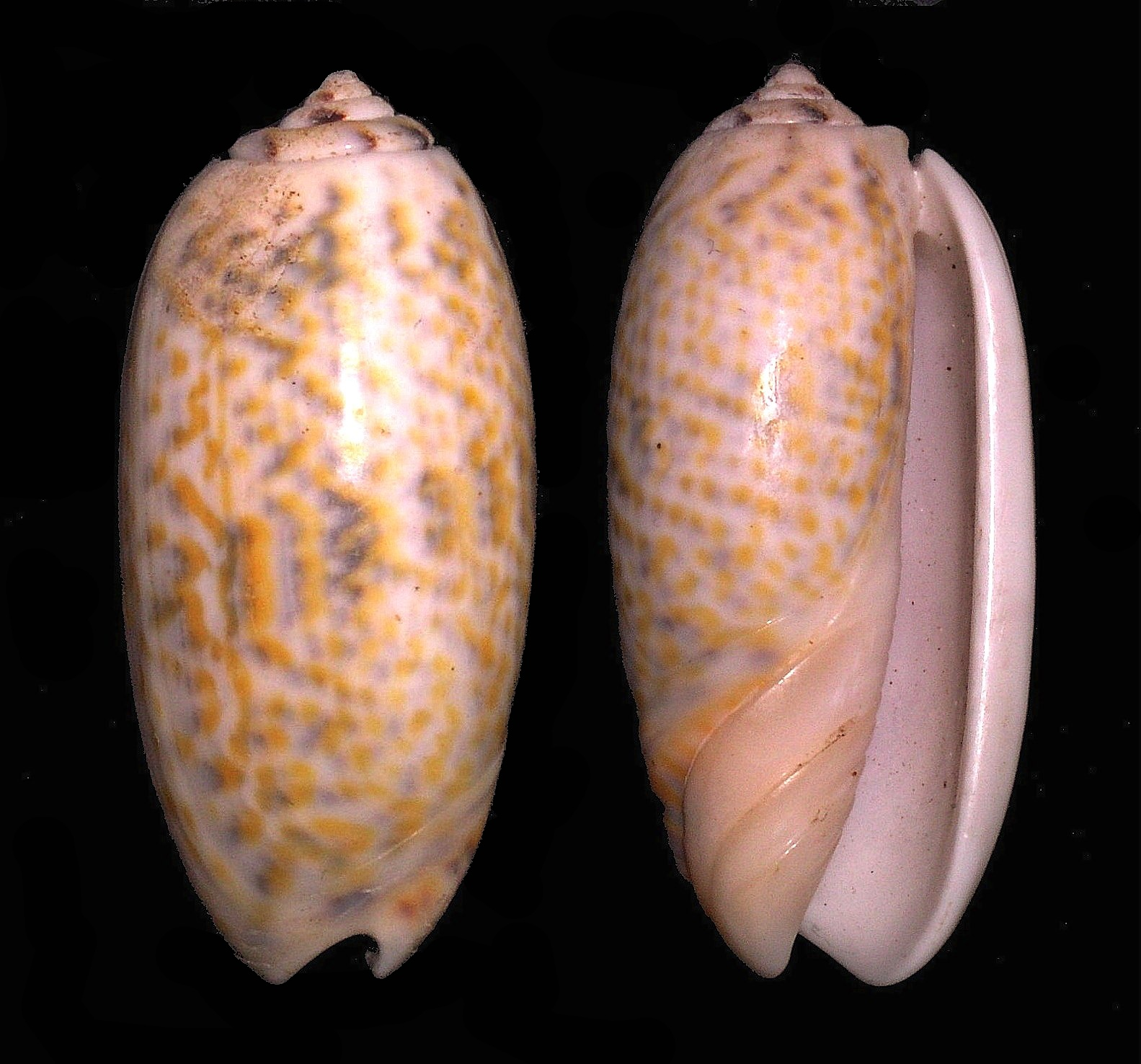
Oliva tricolor

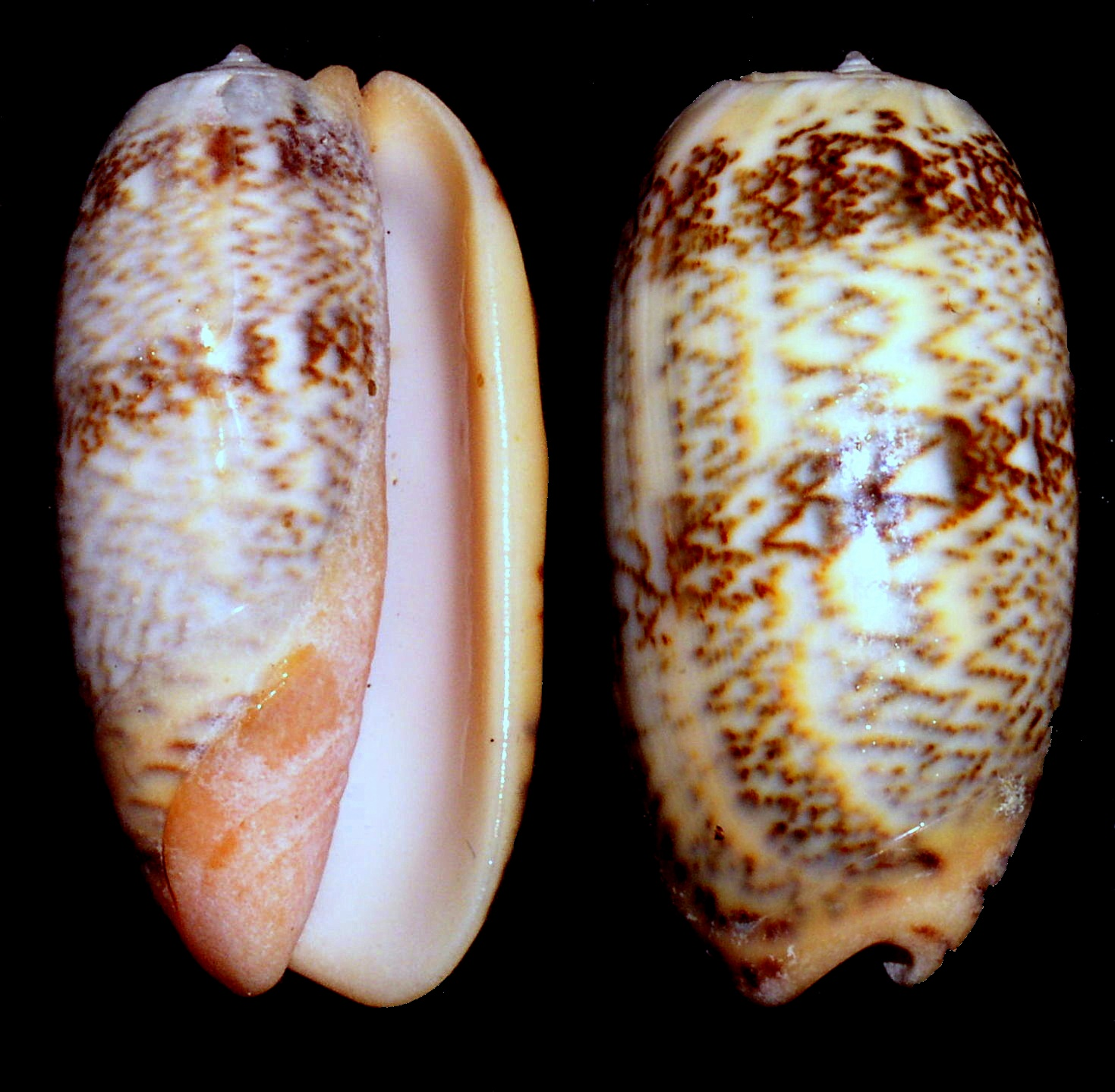
Oliva vidua
