= Oliva violacea =

Scientific classification
- Kingdom: Animalia
- Phylum: Mollusca
- Class: Gastropoda
- Subclass: Caenogastropoda
- Order: Neogastropoda
- Family: Olividae
- Genus: Oliva
- Species: O. violacea

Binomial name
- Oliva violacea Marrat, 1867

Species of gastropod

Oliva violacea is a species of sea snail, a marine gastropod mollusk in the family Olividae, the olives.
