= Oliva leonardhilli =

Scientific classification
- Kingdom: Animalia
- Phylum: Mollusca
- Class: Gastropoda
- Subclass: Caenogastropoda
- Order: Neogastropoda
- Family: Olividae
- Genus: Oliva
- Species: O. leonardhilli

Binomial name
- Oliva leonardhilli Petuch & Sargent, 1986

Species of gastropod

Oliva leonardhilli is a species of sea snail, a marine gastropod mollusk in the family Olividae, "Olive snails".

== Description ==
Shell size 25-30 mm.

== Distribution ==
Indian Ocean: Mozambique.
