= Oliva fijiana =

Scientific classification
- Kingdom: Animalia
- Phylum: Mollusca
- Class: Gastropoda
- Subclass: Caenogastropoda
- Order: Neogastropoda
- Family: Olividae
- Genus: Oliva
- Species: O. fijiana

Binomial name
- Oliva fijiana Tursch & Greifender, 2001

Species of gastropod

Oliva fijiana is a species of sea snail, a marine gastropod mollusk in the family Olividae, the olives.
