= Oliva westralis =

Scientific classification
- Kingdom: Animalia
- Phylum: Mollusca
- Class: Gastropoda
- Subclass: Caenogastropoda
- Order: Neogastropoda
- Family: Olividae
- Genus: Oliva
- Species: O. westralis

Binomial name
- Oliva westralis Petuch & Sargent, 1986

Species of gastropod

Oliva westralis is a species of sea snail, a marine gastropod mollusk in the family Olividae, the olive snails.

== Description ==
This species attains a size of 35 mm.

== Distribution ==
Queensland, Australia.
