= Oliva sargenti =

Scientific classification
- Kingdom: Animalia
- Phylum: Mollusca
- Class: Gastropoda
- Subclass: Caenogastropoda
- Order: Neogastropoda
- Family: Olividae
- Genus: Oliva
- Species: O. sargenti

Binomial name
- Oliva sargenti Petuch, 1987

Species of gastropod

Oliva sargenti is a species of sea snail, a marine gastropod mollusk in the family Olividae, the olives.

== Description ==
Original description: "Shell small for subgenus, ovate in outline, with rounded sides; spire low, body inflated, wider at mid-body than at shoulder; color pale bluish-white overlaid with loose network of very fine, pale tan triangles in netted pattern; triangles often aligned in zig-zag fashion, running length of shell from suture to anterior end; zig-zag and netted pattern overlaid with 2 wide bands of dark brown spots; one above mid-body, one below; in mature specimens, color pattern obscured by milky, bluish-white enamel glaze; columella with 14-15 well-developed plications; anterior end of columella with characteristic reddish patch; edge of suture bordered with numerous fine, hairstreak brown flammules and intermittent large pale blue flammules; interior of aperture white; inner edge of lip bordered with dark brown flammules; protoconch large, pale tan."

== Distribution ==
Locus typicus: "Malmok, Aruba Island, Netherlands Antilles."
