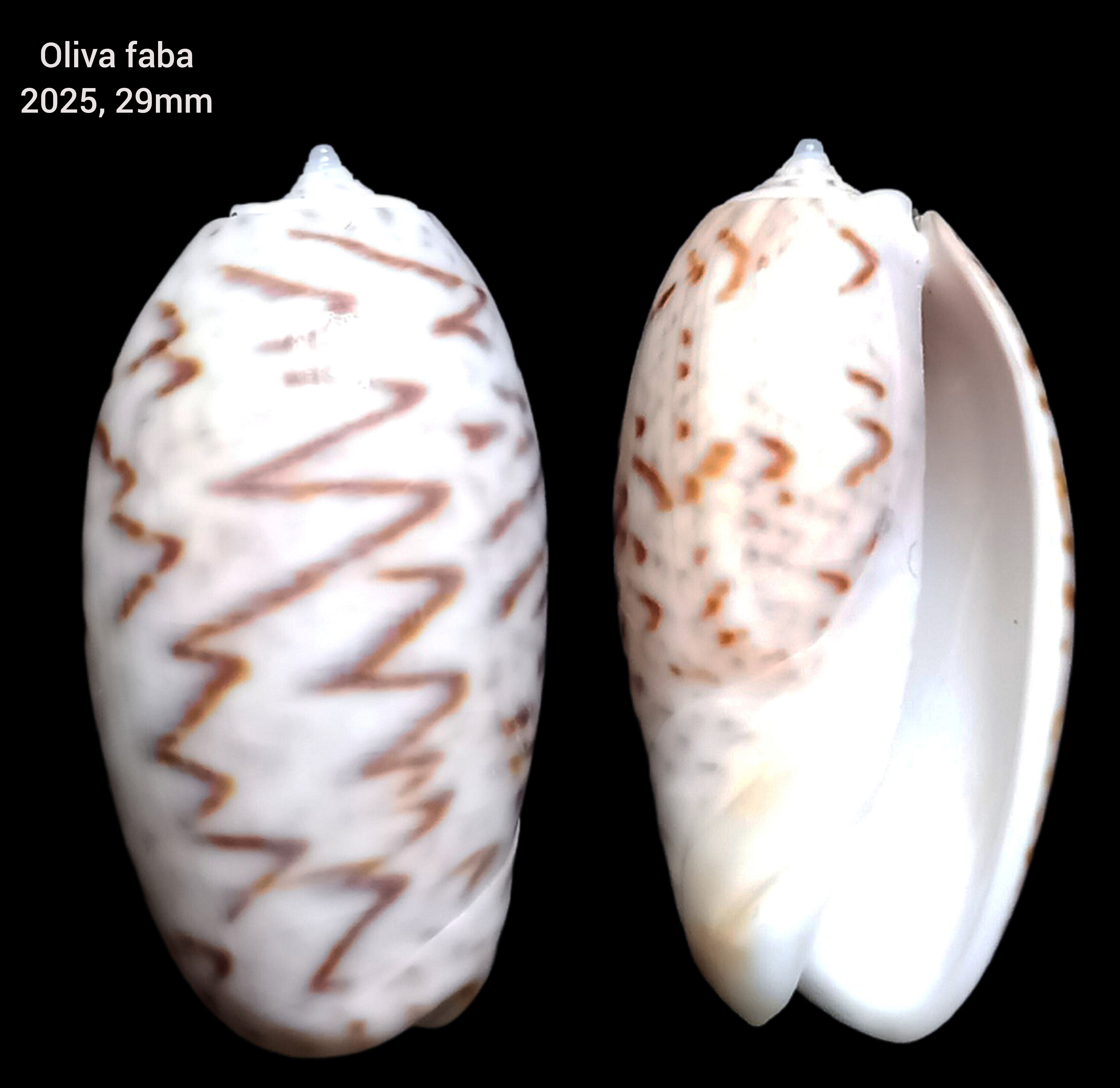

Scientific classification
- Kingdom: Animalia
- Phylum: Mollusca
- Class: Gastropoda
- Subclass: Caenogastropoda
- Order: Neogastropoda
- Family: Olividae
- Genus: Oliva
- Species: O. faba

Binomial name
- Oliva faba Marrat, 1867

Synonyms
- Oliva (Oliva) vanuatuensis Petuch, E.J. & D.M. Sargent, 1986; Oliva (Proxoliva) faba Marrat, 1867; Oliva smithi Bridgman, 1906

= Oliva faba =

Species of gastropod

Oliva faba is a species of sea snail, a marine gastropod mollusk in the family Olividae, the olives.

== Description ==
Typically, the shell is elongated and slender, with straight sides. The length of the shell varies between 15 mm and 39 mm. It is normally green or yellow, overlaid with purple-brown zigzags and triangular markings, often merging into a dense reticulated pattern.

== Distribution ==
This marine species occurs off Indonesia, Sri Lanka and Vanuatu.
