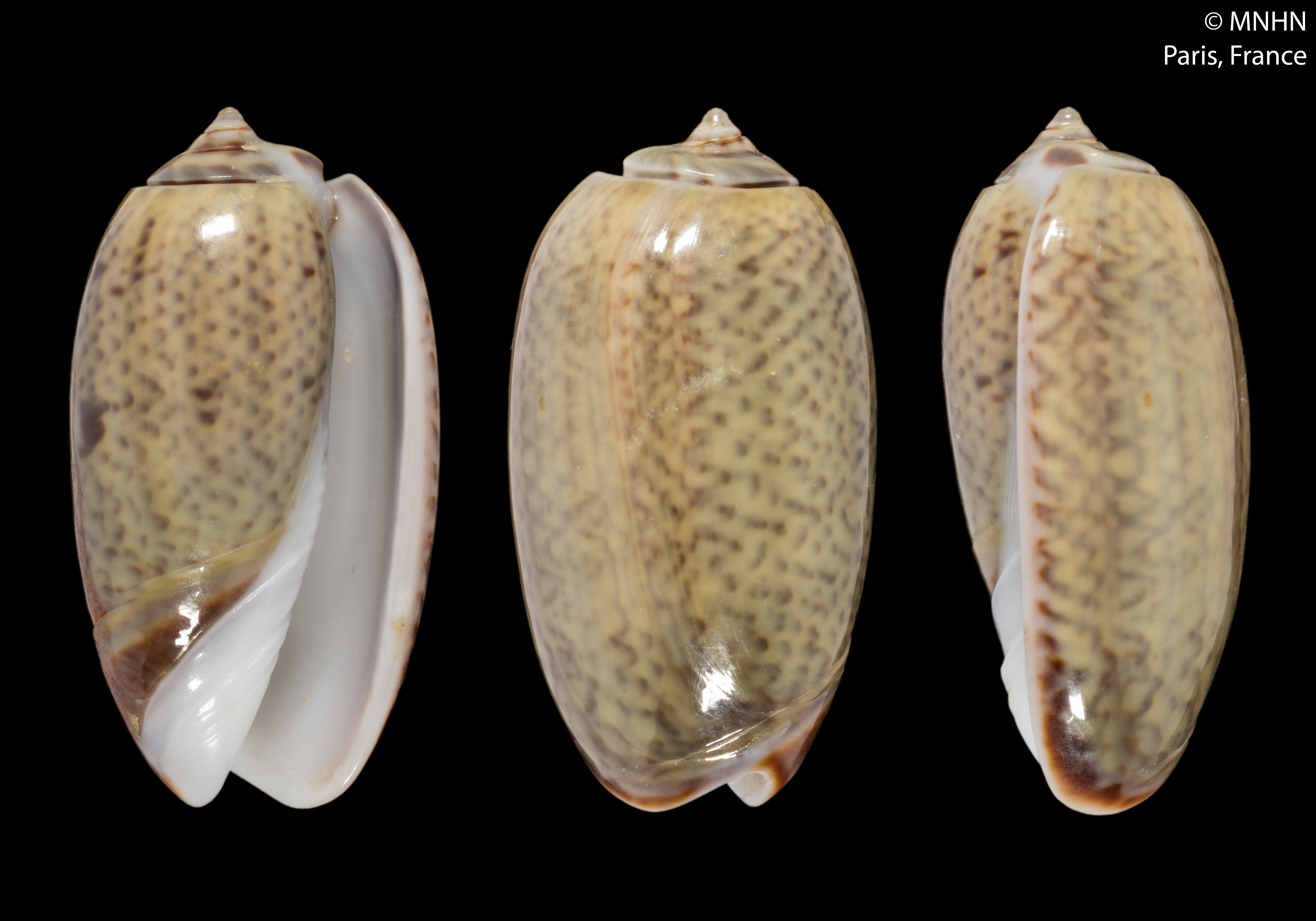
- Shell of Oliva dactyliola (syntype at MNHN, Paris)

Scientific classification
- Kingdom: Animalia
- Phylum: Mollusca
- Class: Gastropoda
- Subclass: Caenogastropoda
- Order: Neogastropoda
- Family: Olividae
- Genus: Oliva
- Species: O. dactyliola

Binomial name
- Oliva dactyliola Duclos, 1840

= Oliva dactyliola =

Species of gastropod

Oliva dactyliola is a species of sea snail, a marine gastropod mollusk in the family Olividae, the olives.

== Description ==
The length of the shell attains 26.6 mm.

== Distribution ==
This marine species occurs from the Philippines and Indonesia to the Fijis and the Solomon Islands.
