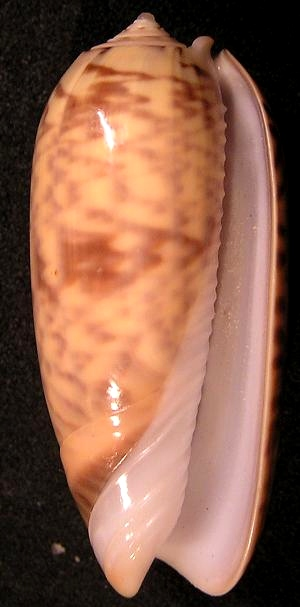
- Apertural view of a shell of Oliva hirasei

Scientific classification
- Kingdom: Animalia
- Phylum: Mollusca
- Class: Gastropoda
- Subclass: Caenogastropoda
- Order: Neogastropoda
- Family: Olividae
- Genus: Oliva
- Species: O. hirasei

Binomial name
- Oliva hirasei Kira, 1959

Synonyms
- Oliva (Miniaceoliva) hirasei Kira, 1959

= Oliva hirasei =

Species of gastropod

Oliva hirasei, common name Hirase's olive, is a species of sea snail, a marine gastropod mollusk in the family Olividae, the olives.

== Description ==
The length of the shell varies between 35 mm and 60 mm. World Record size 70.2 mm.

== Distribution ==
This marine species occurs off Japan, Vietnam, the Philippines, Indonesia and New Caledonia.
