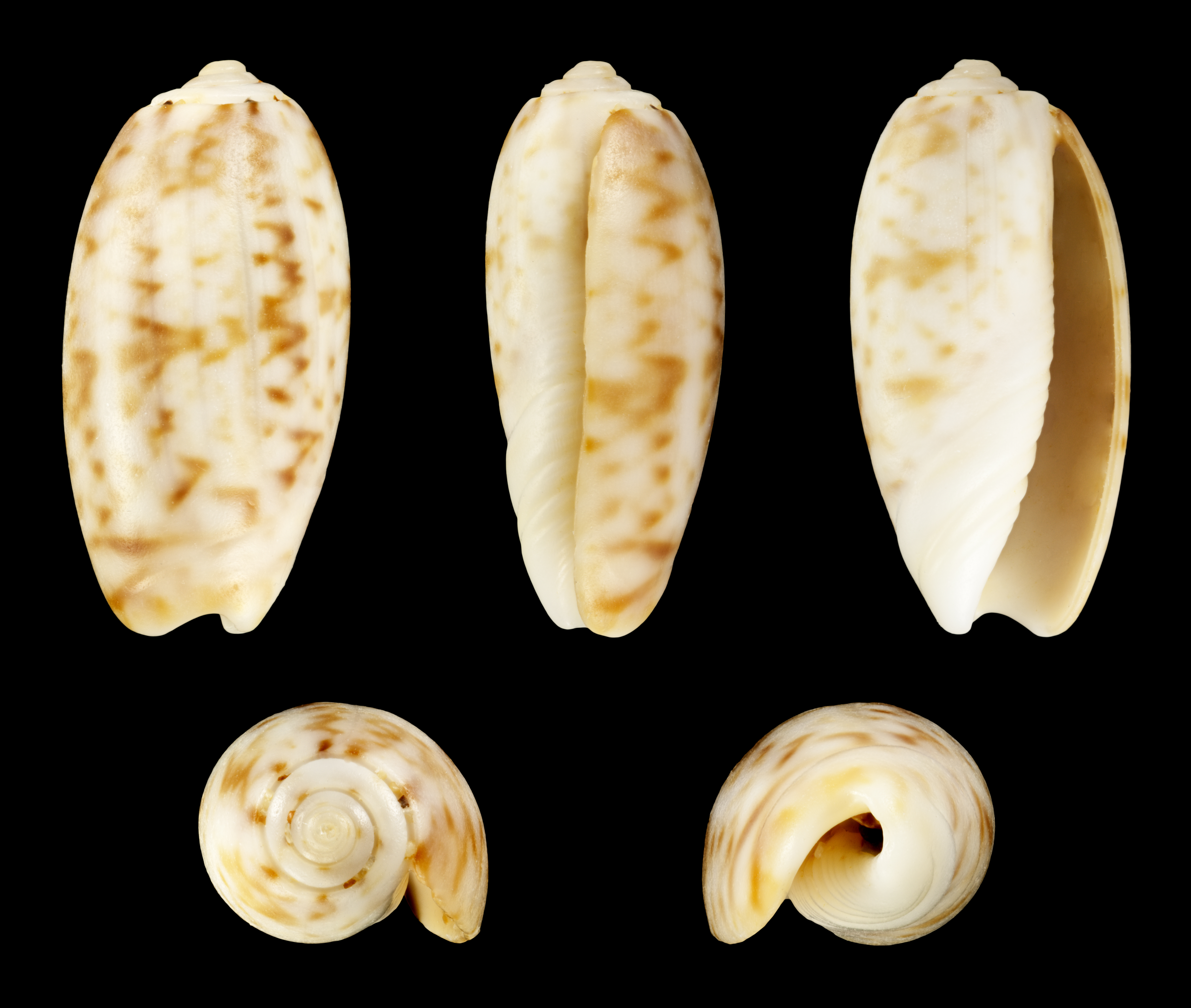

Scientific classification
- Kingdom: Animalia
- Phylum: Mollusca
- Class: Gastropoda
- Subclass: Caenogastropoda
- Order: Neogastropoda
- Family: Olividae
- Genus: Oliva
- Species: O. todosina

Binomial name
- Oliva todosina Duclos, 1840

Synonyms
- Oliva lepida Duclos, 1840; Oliva todosina f. lepida Duclos, 1840; Oliva todosina f. volvarioides Duclos, 1840; Oliva volvaroides Duclos, 1835

= Oliva todosina =

Species of gastropod

Oliva todosina, common name the pretty olive, is a species of small sea snail, a marine gastropod mollusk in the family Olividae, the olives.

== Subspecies ==
- Oliva todosina solomonensis Petuch & Sargent, 1986
- Oliva todosina todosina Duclos, 1840

== Description ==
The length of the shell varies between 14 mm and 28 mm.

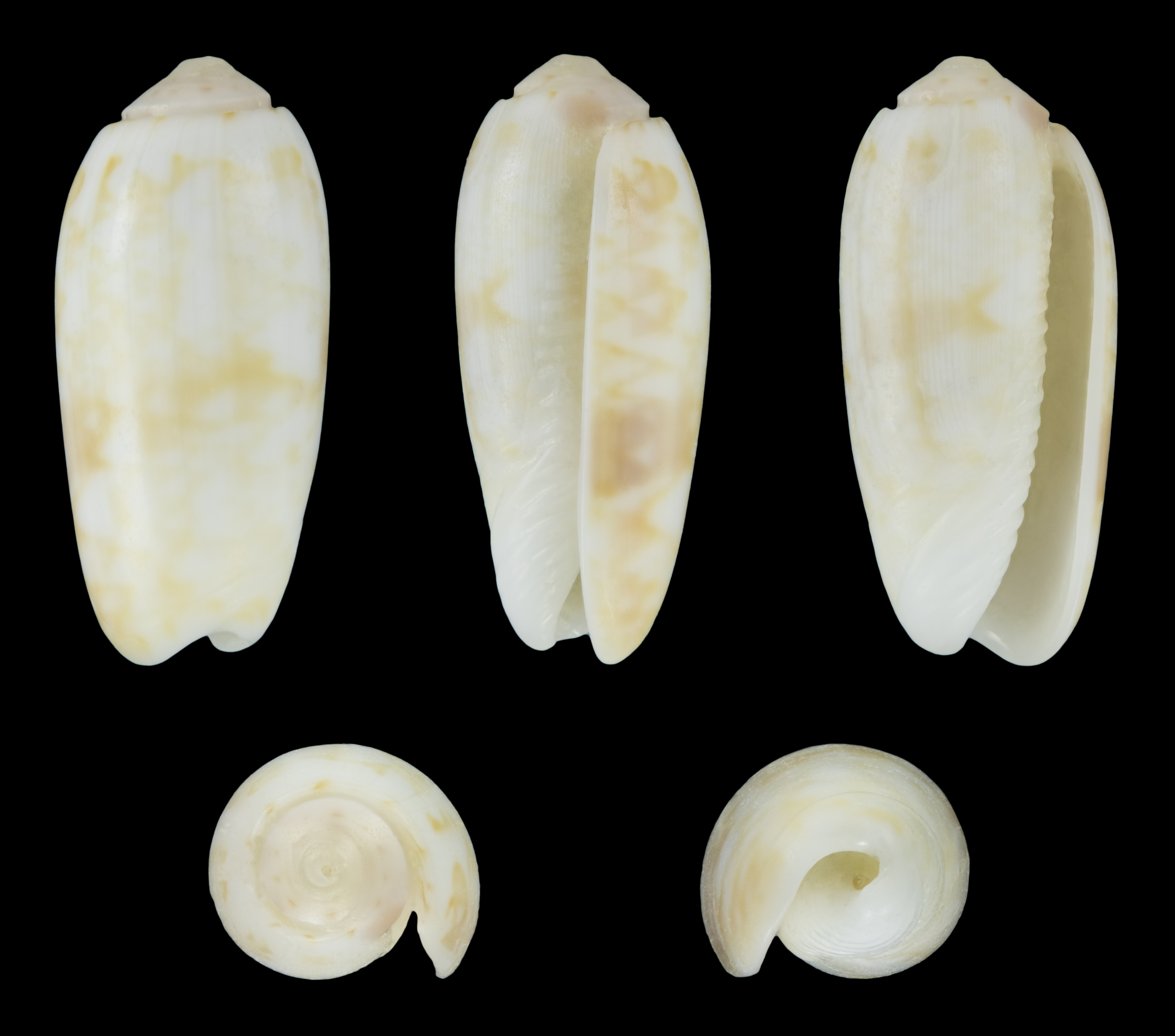
var. lepida

== Distribution ==
This marine species occurs off Madagascar and in the Bay of Bengal; also off Japan, Micronesia, Papua New Guinea, and Polynesia.
