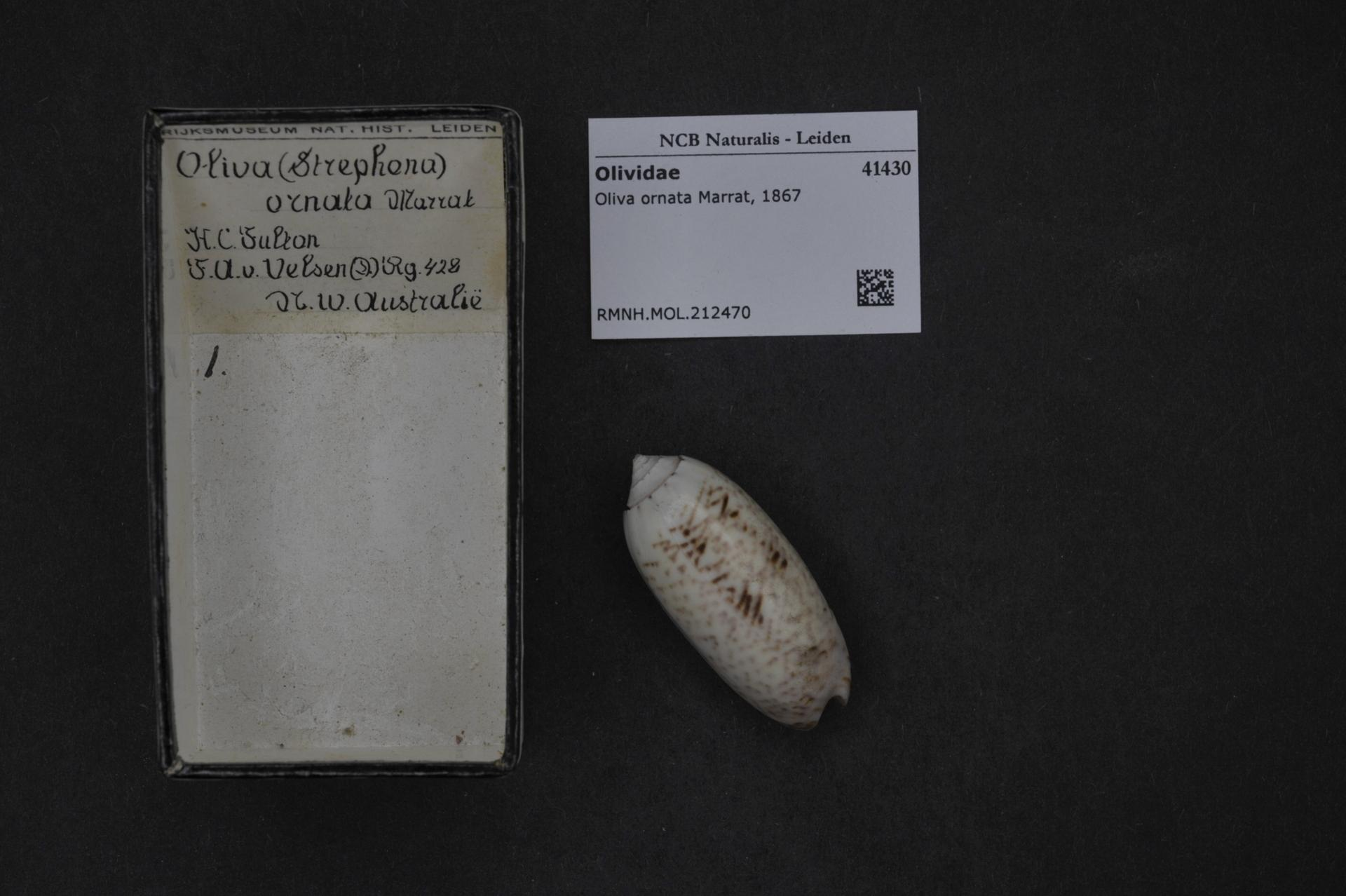

Scientific classification
- Kingdom: Animalia
- Phylum: Mollusca
- Class: Gastropoda
- Subclass: Caenogastropoda
- Order: Neogastropoda
- Family: Olividae
- Genus: Oliva
- Species: O. ornata

Binomial name
- Oliva ornata Marrat, 1867

= Oliva ornata =

Species of gastropod

Oliva ornata is a species of sea snail, a marine gastropod mollusk in the family Olividae, the olives.

== Distribution ==
Western Australia.
