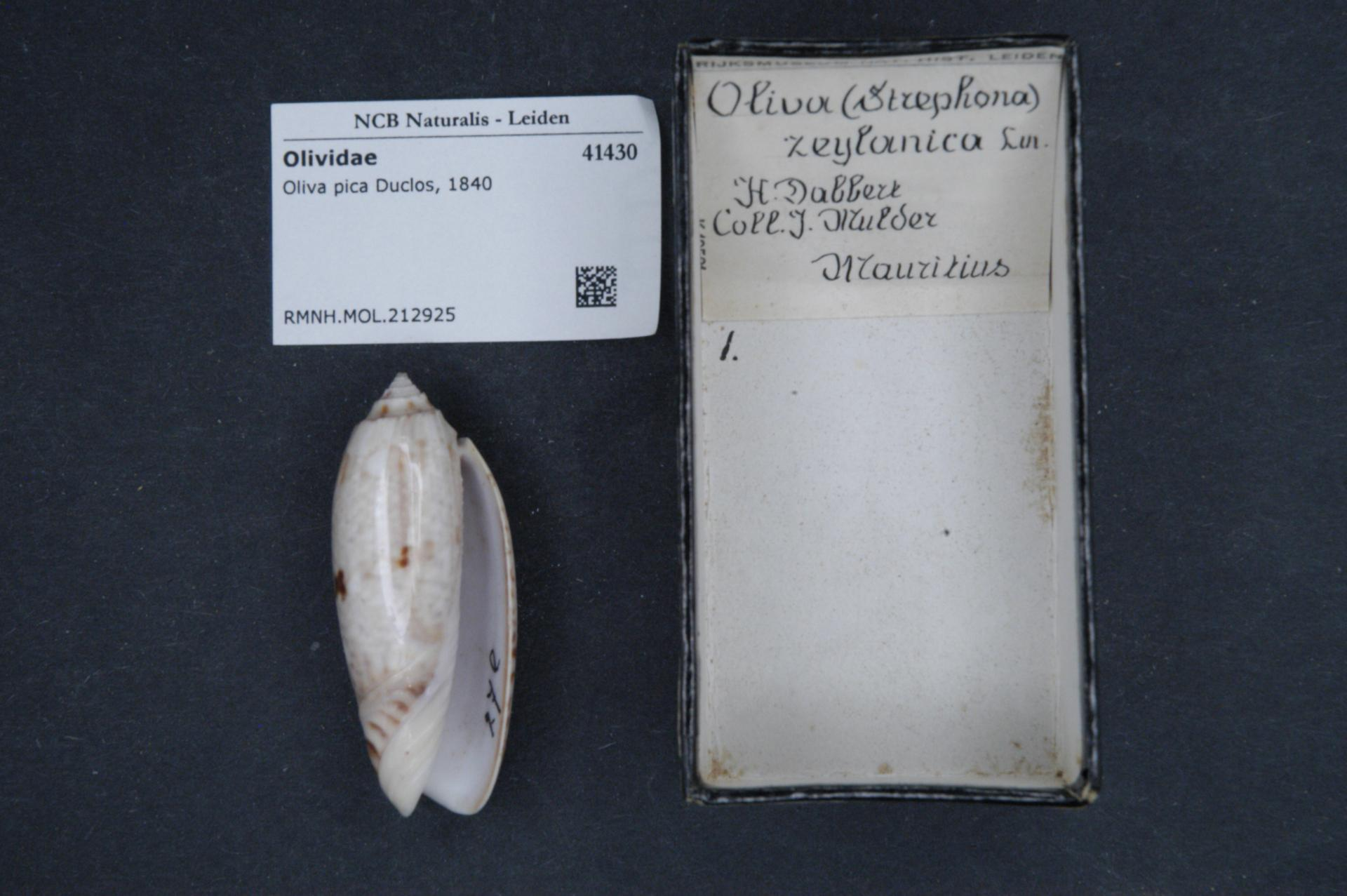

Scientific classification
- Kingdom: Animalia
- Phylum: Mollusca
- Class: Gastropoda
- Subclass: Caenogastropoda
- Order: Neogastropoda
- Family: Olividae
- Genus: Oliva
- Species: O. pica

Binomial name
- Oliva pica Duclos, 1840

Synonyms
- Oliva (Miniaceoliva) pica Lamarck, 1811; Oliva mascarena Tursch & Greifeneder, 1996

= Oliva pica =

Species of gastropod

Oliva pica is a species of sea snail, a marine gastropod mollusk in the family Olividae, the olives.

== Distribution ==
This species occurs in the Indian Ocean off Mauritius and the Seychelles.
