= Shell money =

Historical currency using sea shells

Shell money is a medium of exchange similar to coin money and other forms of commodity money, and was once commonly used in many parts of the world. Shell money usually consisted of whole or partial sea shells, often worked into beads or otherwise shaped. The use of shells in trade began as direct commodity exchange, the shells having use-value as body ornamentation. The distinction between beads as commodities and beads as money has been the subject of debate among economic anthropologists.

Shell money has appeared in the Americas, Asia, Africa and Australia. The shell most widely used worldwide as currency was the shell of Monetaria moneta, the money cowry. This species is most abundant in the Indian Ocean, and was collected in the Maldive Islands, in Sri Lanka, along the Malabar coast, in Borneo and on other East Indian islands, and in various parts of the African coast from Ras Hafun to Mozambique. Cowry shell money was an important part of the trade networks of Africa, South Asia, and East Asia.

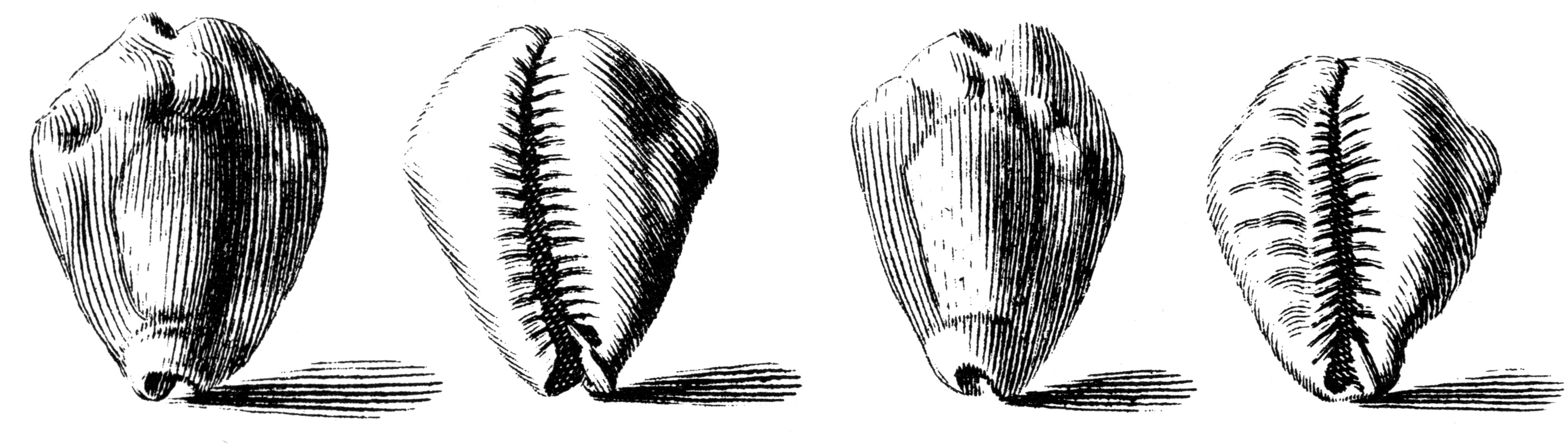
1742 drawing of shells of the money cowry, Monetaria moneta.

== North America ==
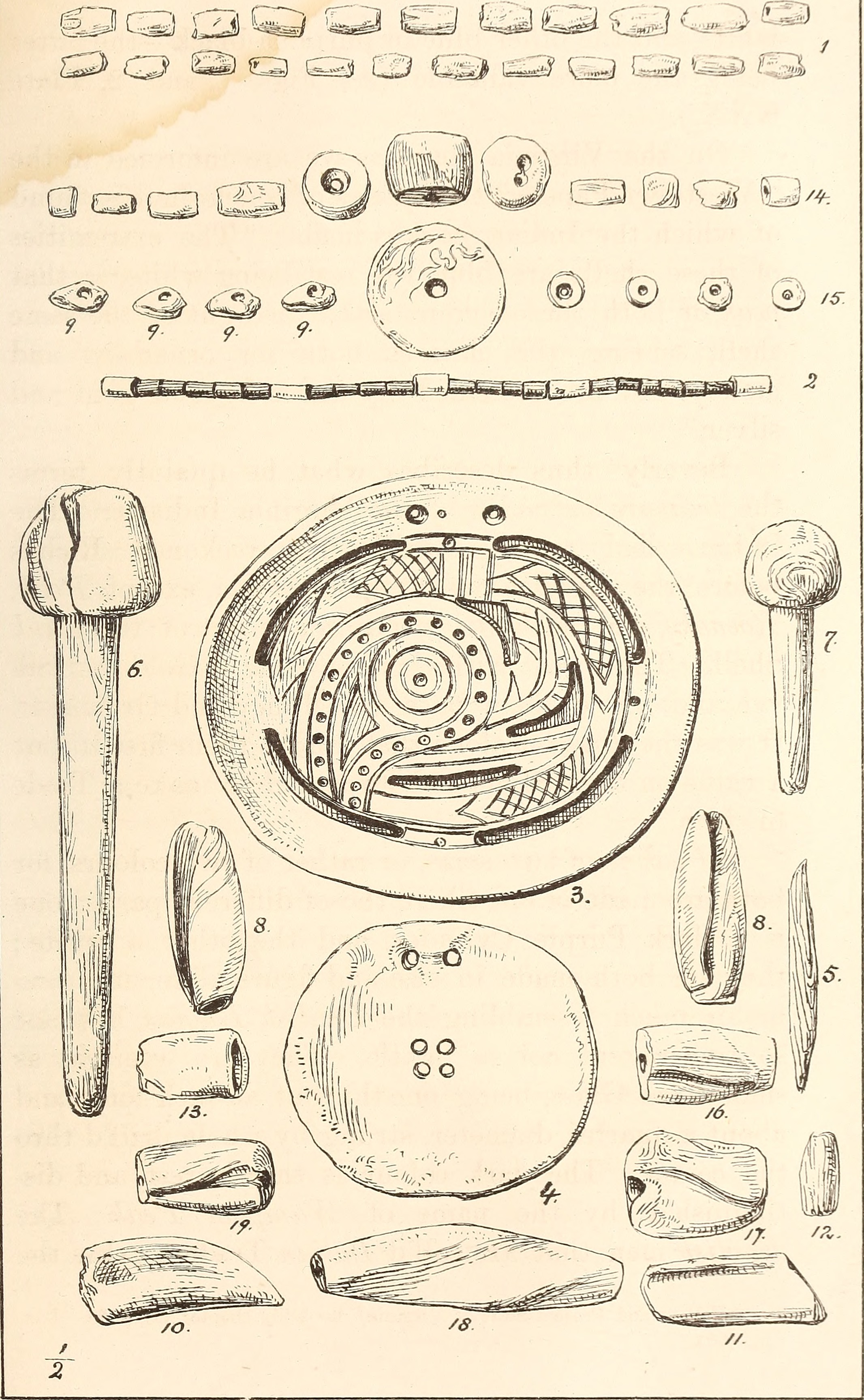
Antiquities of the southern Indigenous, particularly of the Georgia tribes (1873)

On the east coast of North America, Indigenous peoples of the Iroquois Confederacy and Algonquian tribes, such as the Shinnecock tribe, ground beads called wampum, which were cut from the purple part of the shell of the marine bivalve Mercenaria mercenaria, more commonly known as the hard clam or quahog. White beads were cut from the white part of the quahog or whelk shells. Iroquois peoples strung these shells on string in lengths, or wove them in belts.

The shell most valued by the Native American tribes of the Pacific Coast from Alaska to northwest California was Dentalium, one of several species of tusk shell or scaphopod. The tusk shell is naturally open at both ends, and can easily be strung on a thread. This shell money was valued by its length rather than the exact number of shells; the "ligua", the highest denomination in their currency, was a length of about 150 mm (6 in).

Farther south, in central California and southern California, the shell of the olive snail Olivella biplicata was used to make beads for at least 9,000 years. The small numbers recovered in older archaeological site components suggest that they were initially used as ornamentation, rather than as money. Beginning shortly before 1,000 years ago, Chumash specialists on the islands of California's Santa Barbara Channel began chipping beads from olive shells in such quantities that they left meter-deep piles of manufacturing residue in their wake; the resulting circular beads were used as money throughout the area that is now southern California. Starting at about AD 1500, and continuing into the late nineteenth century, the Coast Miwok, Ohlone, Patwin, Pomo, and Wappo peoples of central California used the marine bivalve Saxidomus sp. to make shell money.

== Africa ==
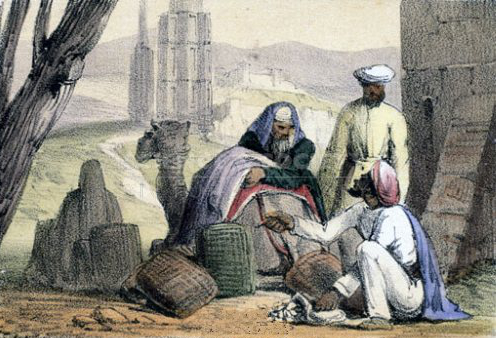
This 1845 British illustration gives an artist's impression of traders in Africa using cowry shells as money.

In Africa shell money was widely used as legal tender up until the mid 19th century. The shells of Olivella nana, the sparkling dwarf olive sea snail were harvested on Luanda Island for use as currency in the Kingdom of Kongo. They were even traded north as far as the Kingdom of Benin. In the Kongo they were called nzimbu or zimbo. The shell of the large land snail, Achatina monetaria, cut into circles with an open centre was also used as coin in Benguella.

In West Africa the cowrie shell was widely used, including regions far from the coast. By the early 16th century European traders were importing thousands of kilograms of cowries to trade for cloth, food, wax, hides, and other goods as well as slaves. These currency flows were instrumental in the development of the powerful states of Benin, Ouidah and others along the coast. Between 1500 and 1875 at least 30 billion cowries were imported to the Bight of Benin, accounting for 44% of the total value of trade. Around 1850 the German explorer Heinrich Barth found it fairly widespread in Kano, Kuka, Gando, and even Timbuktu. Barth relates that in Muniyoma, one of the ancient divisions of Bornu, the king's revenue was estimated at 30,000,000 shells, with every adult male being required to pay annually 1,000 shells for himself, 1,000 for every pack-ox, and 2,000 for every slave in his possession.

The shells were fastened together in strings of forty or one-hundred each, so that fifty or twenty strings represented a dollar.

As the value of the cowrie and the nzimbu was much greater in Africa than in the regions from which European traders obtained their supply, the trade was extremely lucrative. In some cases the gains are said to have been 500%. As these currency imports increased, however, inflation took hold and damaged the local economies.

In parts of British West Africa, cowries remained accepted for tax payments until the early 20th centuries, and their use as currency in unregulated environments persisted until the 1960s. The national currency of Ghana introduced in 1965, the cedi, was named after cowrie shells.

== Asia ==
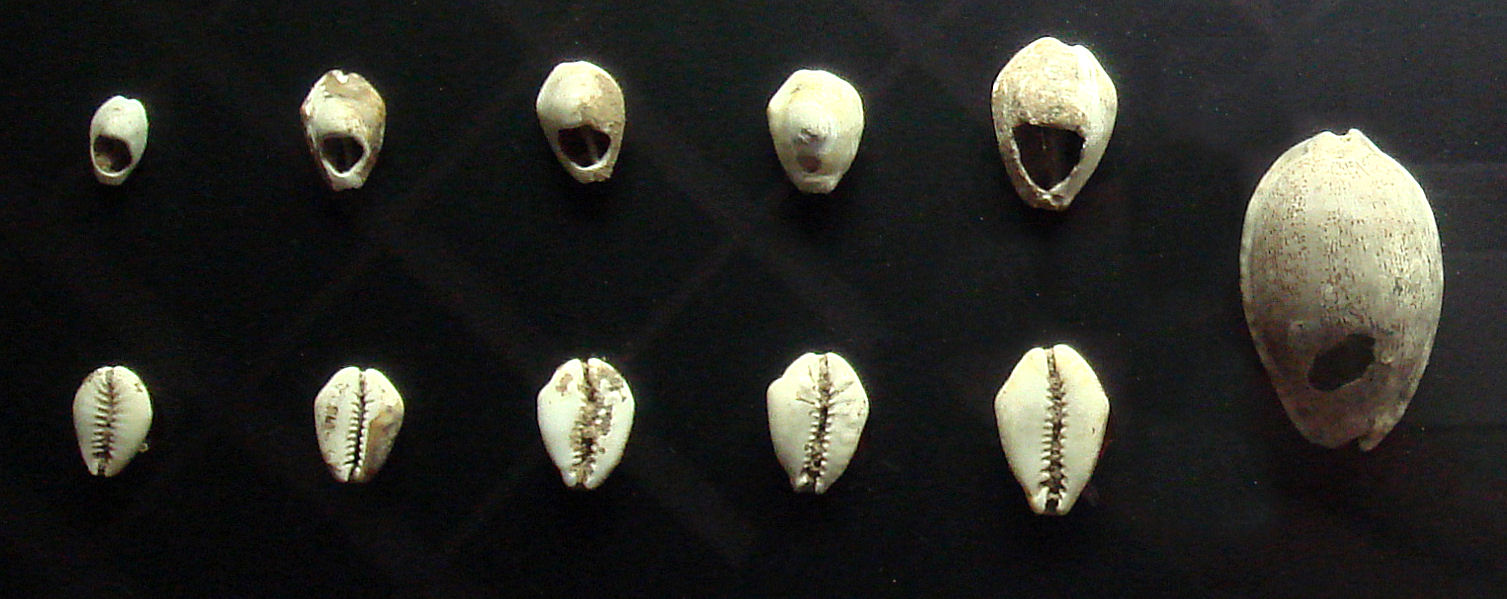
Chinese shell money, 16th–8th centuries BC.

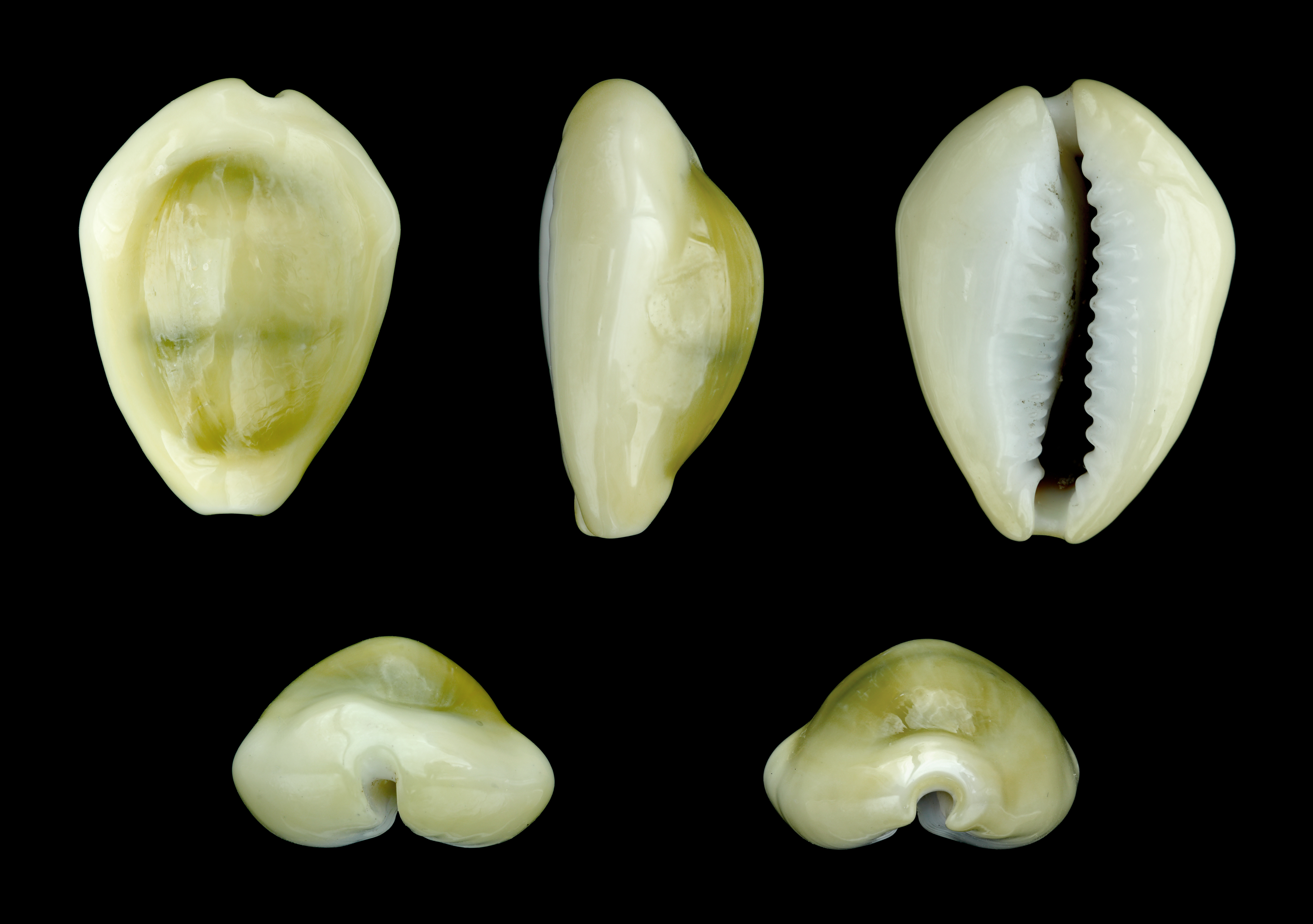
Money cowry (Monetaria moneta); length 2.6 cm; Palou Tello, Batu Islands, Indonesia

In ancient China, cowries were so important that many characters relating to money or trade contain the character for cowry 貝 as a component (e.g. 價 "price", 費 "to spend", 買 "to buy", 財 "wealth", 貨 "commodities"). Starting over three thousand years ago, cowry shells, or copies of the shells, were used as Chinese currency. The Classical Chinese character radical for "money" or "currency", 貝, originated as a pictograph of a cowrie shell. The ancient Chinese primarily used shells of Monetaria moneta and Monetaria annulus from the Indian Ocean, which were transported to China via Central Asia, as used in the city of Erlitou. Later, bronze cowries (銅貝) imitating money cowries were made by the Shang (c. 1600 – c. 1046 BC) and Zhou (c. 1046 – 256 BC) dynasties before becoming widely circulated in the Chu state during the Warring States period (475 – 222 BC). The use of cowries was abolished by the Qin dynasty when it unified China and standardized ancient Chinese currencies into the system of cash coins.

Shell money was used as currency in Yunnan between the ninth and seventeenth centuries, where it served for high-value deals. Unlike in ancient northern China, the use of cowrie shells in Yunnan was connected to its close economic and cultural ties with Mainland Southeast Asia and the Indian Ocean.

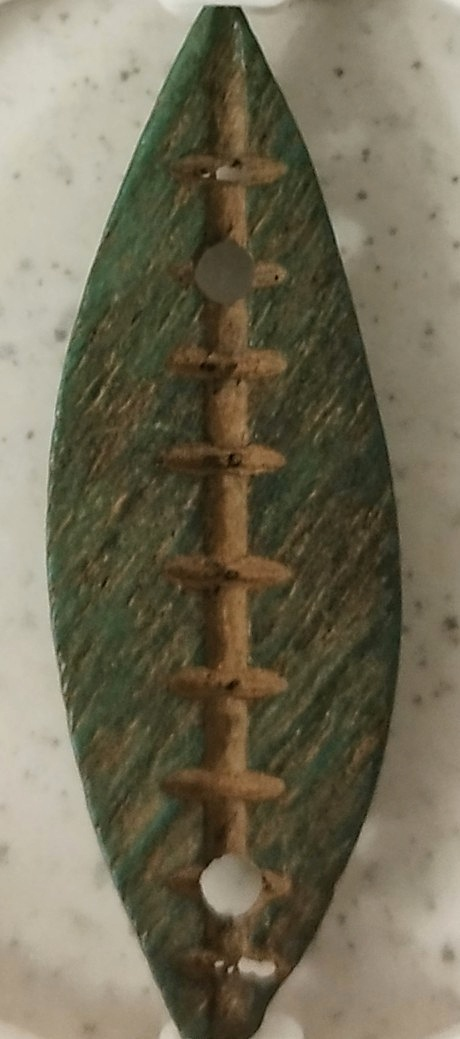
Cowrie shell in green bone, Jin State, China, Western Zhou period (1046 BC–771 BC); length: 40.3 mm

Cowries or kaudi were used as means of exchange in India since ancient times up to around 1830. In Bengal, they were exchanged at a rate of 2560 to a rupee. Another exchange rate had 4 cowries equal 1 ganda, 5 gandas equal 1 budis, 4 budis equal 1 pana, 16 panas equal 1 kahan, and 10 kahanas equal 1 tanka/rupee).

The annual importation in early 19th century Bengal from the Maldives was valued at about 30,000 rupees. A single slave would sell for 25,000 cowries.

In Orissa, India, the use of the kaudi was abolished by the British East India Company in 1805 in favour of silver. This was one of the causes of the Paik Rebellion in 1817.

In Southeast Asia, when the value of the Siamese tical (baht) was about half a troy ounce of silver (about 16 grams), the value of the cowrie (Thai: เบี้ย bia) was fixed at 1/6400 baht.

== Oceania and Australia ==
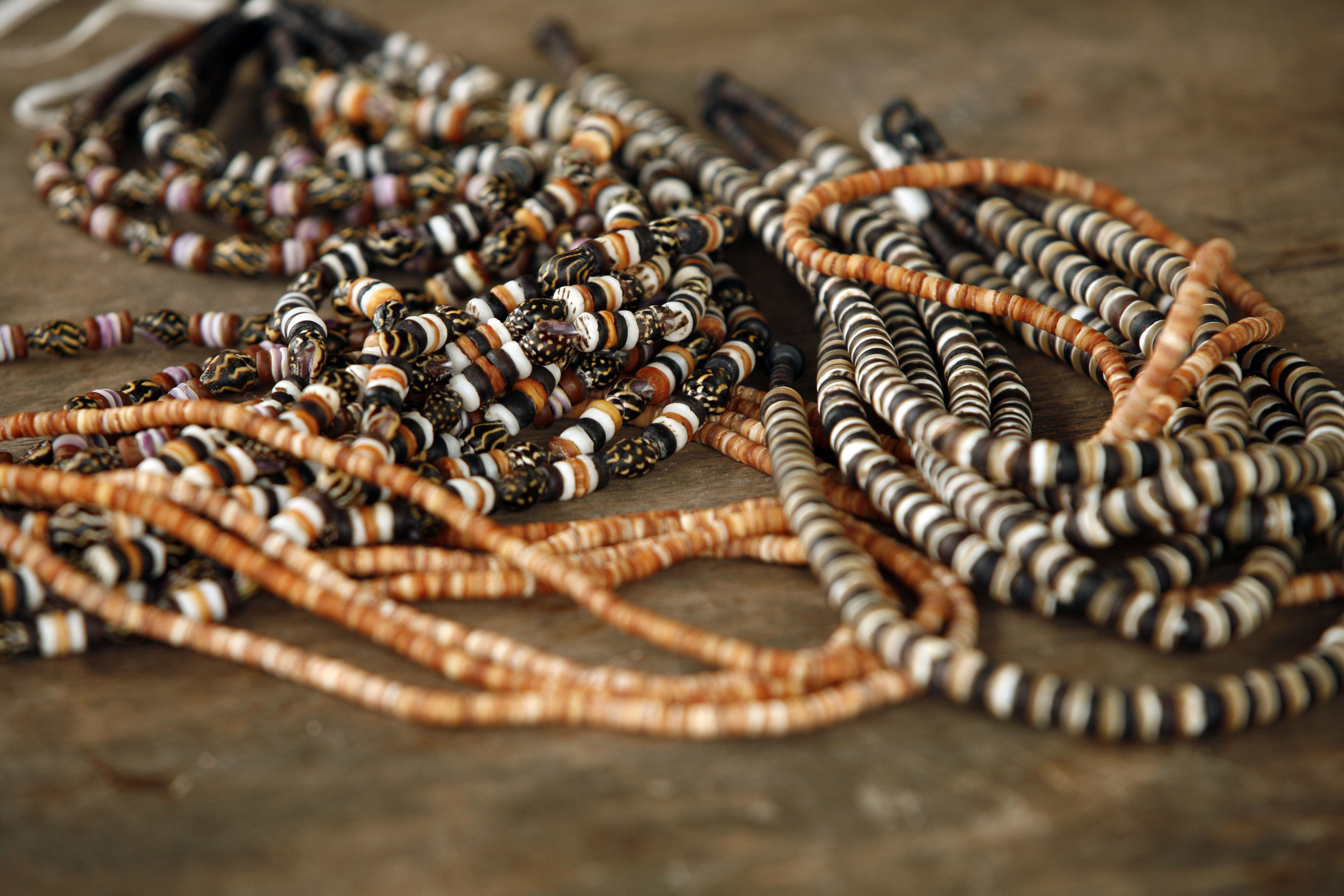
Papua New Guinea shell money

In northern Australia, different shells were used by different tribes, one tribe's shell often being quite worthless in the eyes of another tribe.

In the islands north of New Guinea the shells were broken into flakes. Holes were bored through these flakes, which were then valued by the length of a threaded set on a string, as measured using the finger joints. Two shells are used by these Pacific islanders, one a cowry found on the New Guinea coast, and the other the common pearl shell, broken into flakes.

In the South Pacific Islands the species Oliva carneola was commonly used to create shell money. As late as 1882, local trade in the Solomon Islands was carried on by means of a coinage of shell beads, small shells laboriously ground down to the required size by the women. No more than were actually needed were made, and as the process was difficult, the value of the coinage was satisfactorily maintained.

Although rapidly being replaced by modern coinage, the cowry shell currency is still in use to some extent in the Solomon Islands. The shells are worked into strips of decorated cloth whose value reflects the time spent creating them.

In parts of Papua New Guinea, shells were historically a valuable currency. They served as a medium of exchange along known networks. The decrease in overall violence during the colonial period meant that these exchange networks expanded, and became accessible to younger individuals. Gold-lipped pearl shells formed part of the payment labourers received at German plantations, along with steel tools. Later, after World War II, migrant workers from New Britain who worked at the Naval Base Manus exchanged their wages for shells before returning home. This new source of shells created inflation, which may have resulted in more people participating in the shell-mediated exchange system. To convert a fresh shell into money, the shell must be polished to remove its skin, shaped to be more round, and have a hole created through which it can be hung from a rope. Some are further modified, although such additional changes do not affect monetary value. Metal currency, including both colonial-era coins and the currency of independent Papua New Guinea, initially served only as a medium of exchange with the outside world, used internally only when no shells were available. The coin and shell currencies differed, with coins being inherently fungible, whereas shells often had individual unique value that related to the relationship between the buyer and the seller. In East New Britain, shell currency is still used and can be exchanged for the Papua New Guinean kina.

== Middle East ==
In parts of West Asia, Monetaria annulus, the ring cowry, so-called because of the bright orange-colored ring on the back or upper side of the shell, was commonly used. Many specimens were found by Sir Austen Henry Layard in his excavations at Nimrud in 1845–1851. In certain regions of present day Bangladesh and India, this type of old cowry is also being discovered.

== See also ==
- Commodity money
- Trade beads, many of which were fashioned out of shells
- Olivella (gastropod), used as a currency by indigenous peoples of California
- Marginella, used as a currency by indigenous peoples of the Southeastern Woodlands
- Spondylus, used as a currency by indigenous peoples of the Andes and Gulf of Mexico
