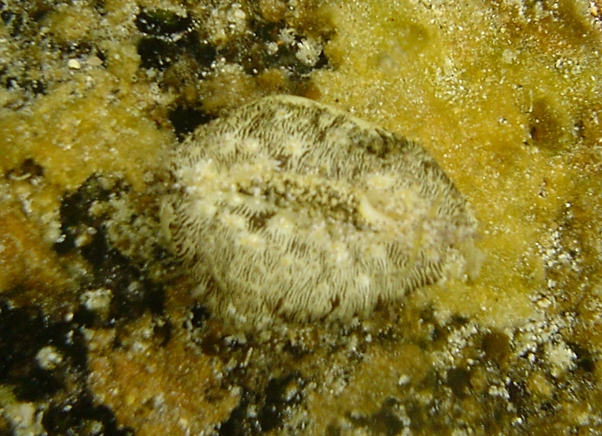
- The underside of a live Monetaria moneta with the mantle partially retracted

Scientific classification
- Kingdom: Animalia
- Phylum: Mollusca
- Class: Gastropoda
- Subclass: Caenogastropoda
- Order: Littorinimorpha
- Superfamily: Cypraeoidea
- Family: Cypraeidae
- Genus: Monetaria; Troschel, 1863

Type species
- Cypraea moneta Linnaeus, 1758

Synonyms
- Aricia Gray, 1837 (invalid: junior homonym of Aricia Savigny, 1822 [Polychaeta]); Cypraea (Aricia) Gray, 1837; Erosaria (Ravitrona) Iredale, 1930; Ornamentaria Schilder & Schilder, 1936; Ravitrona Iredale, 1930

= Monetaria =

Genus of gastropods

Monetaria is a genus of sea snails, marine gastropod mollusks in the family Cypraeidae, the cowries.

== Taxonomy ==
The generic placement is based on the molecular work of Meyer (2003). Some authors have previously placed species in the genus Erosaria (e.g. caputserpentis, by Lorenz and Hubert, 2000)

== Species ==
Species within the genus Monetaria include:

- Monetaria annulus (Linnaeus, 1758)
- Monetaria caputdraconis (Melvill, 1888)
- Monetaria caputophidii (Schilder, 1927)
- Monetaria caputserpentis (Linnaeus, 1758)
- Monetaria moneta (Linnaeus, 1758)
- Monetaria obvelata (Lamarck, 1810)
- † Monetaria simplicissima (K. Martin, 1899)

Species brought into synonymy

- Monetaria britannica Schilder, 1927: synonym of Monetaria moneta (Linnaeus, 1758)
- Monetaria camelorum (Rochebrune, 1884): synonym of Monetaria annulus (Linnaeus, 1758)
- Monetaria candidata Sulliotti, 1924: synonym of Monetaria caputserpentis (Linnaeus, 1758)
- Monetaria chionella Sulliotti, 1924: synonym of Monetaria moneta (Linnaeus, 1758)
- Monetaria endua Steadman & Cotton, 1943: synonym of Monetaria moneta (Linnaeus, 1758)
- Monetaria erua Steadman & Cotton, 1943: synonym of Monetaria moneta (Linnaeus, 1758)
- Monetaria etnographica Rochebrunne, 1884: synonym of Monetaria moneta (Linnaeus, 1758)
- Monetaria etolu Steadman & Cotton, 1943: synonym of Monetaria moneta (Linnaeus, 1758)
- Monetaria hamyi Rochebrune, 1884: synonym of Naria turdus (Lamarck, 1810)
- Monetaria harmandiana Rochebrunne, 1884: synonym of Monetaria annulus (Linnaeus, 1758)
- Monetaria harrisi Iredale, 1939: synonym of Monetaria moneta (Linnaeus, 1758)
- Monetaria isomeres Iredale, 1939: synonym of Monetaria moneta (Linnaeus, 1758)
- Monetaria mercatorium Rochebrunne, 1884: synonym of Monetaria moneta (Linnaeus, 1758)
- Monetaria monetoides Iredale, 1939: synonym of Monetaria moneta (Linnaeus, 1758)
- Monetaria perrieri Rochebrune, 1884: synonym of Monetaria obvelata perrieri Rochebrune, 1884
- Monetaria pleuronectes Rochebrunne, 1884: synonym of Monetaria moneta (Linnaeus, 1758)
- Monetaria pseudomoneta C.-H. Hu, 1992: synonym of Monetaria moneta (Linnaeus, 1758)
- Monetaria rhomboides Schilder & Schilder, 1933: synonym of Monetaria moneta (Linnaeus, 1758)
- Monetaria vestimenti Rochebrunne, 1884: synonym of Monetaria moneta (Linnaeus, 1758)
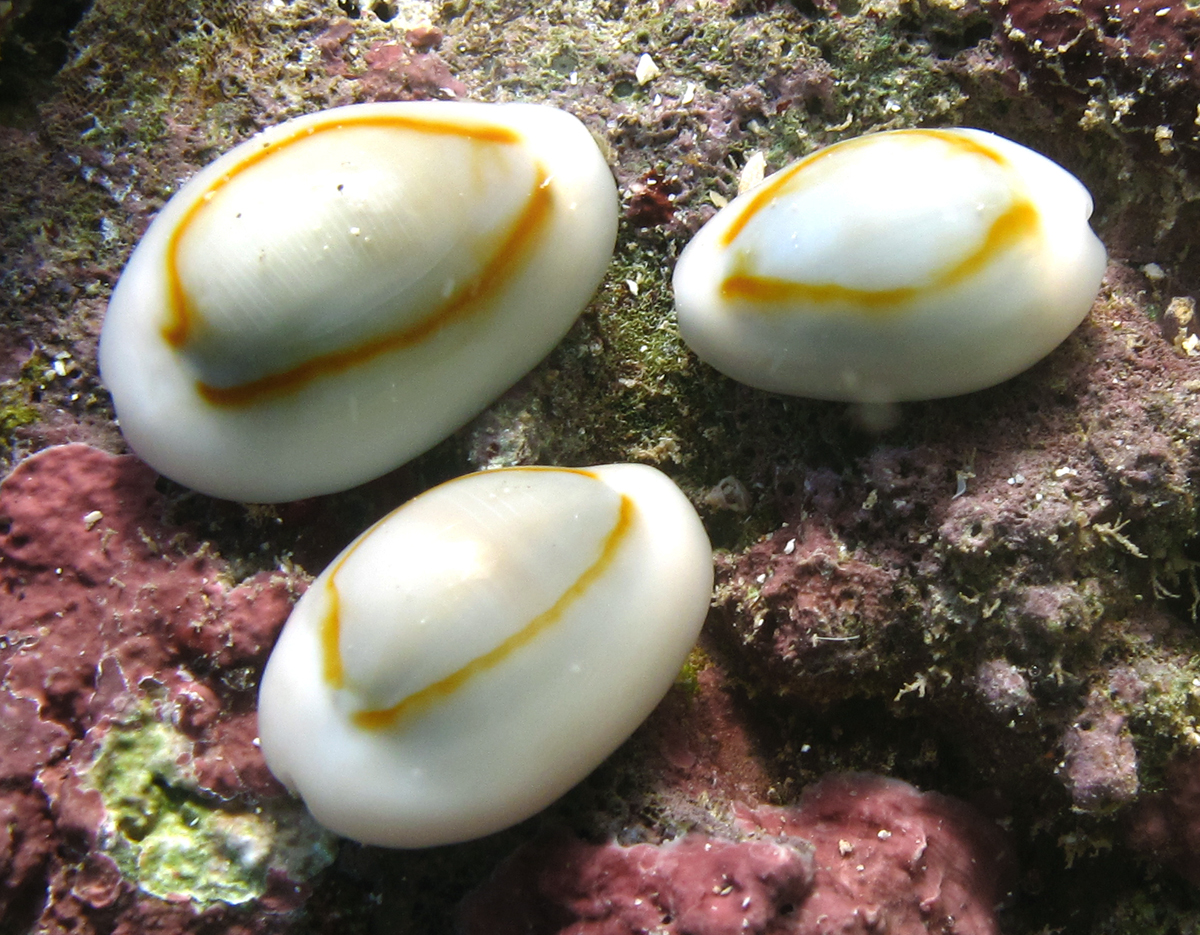
Monetaria annulus

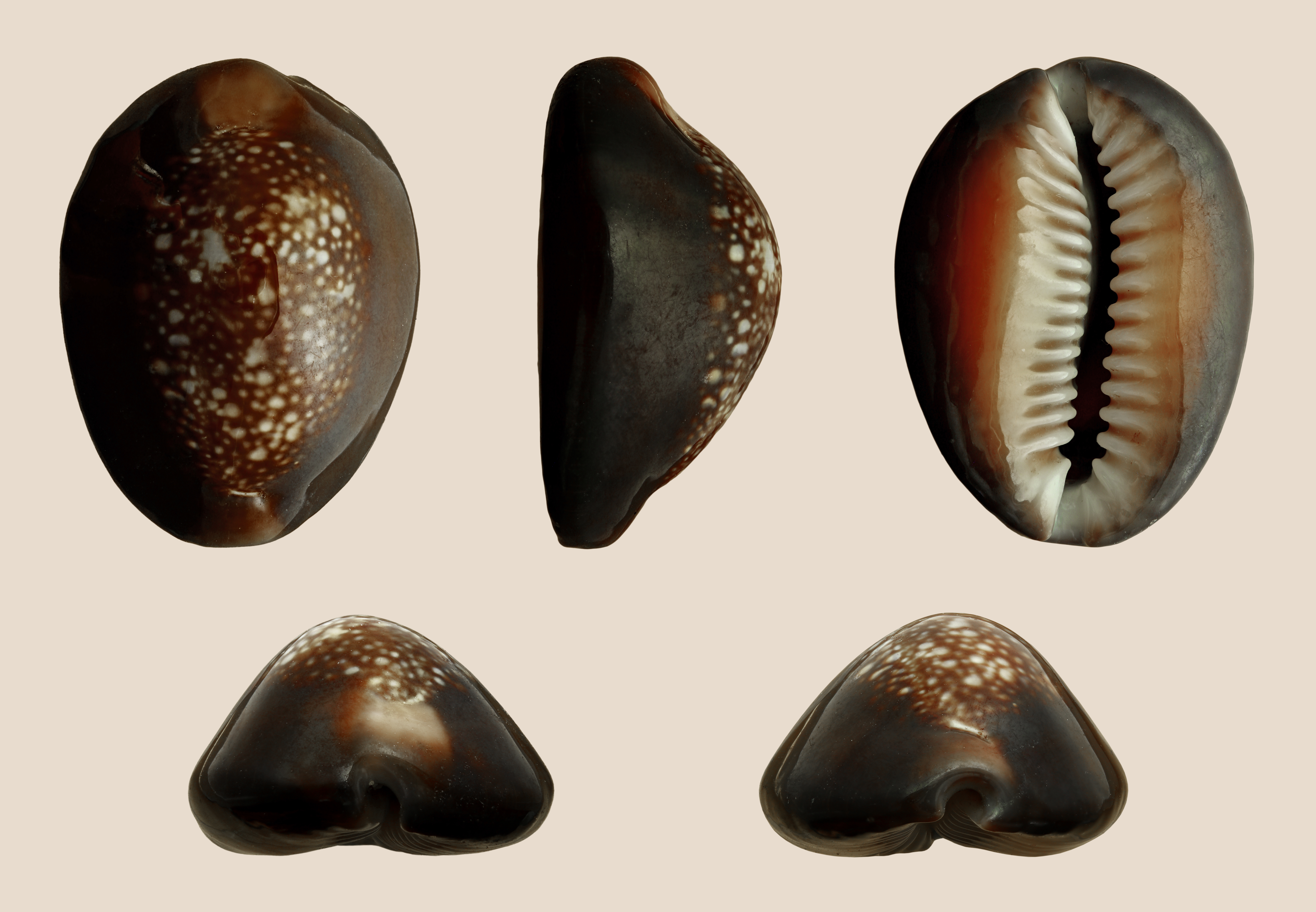
Monetaria caputserpentis

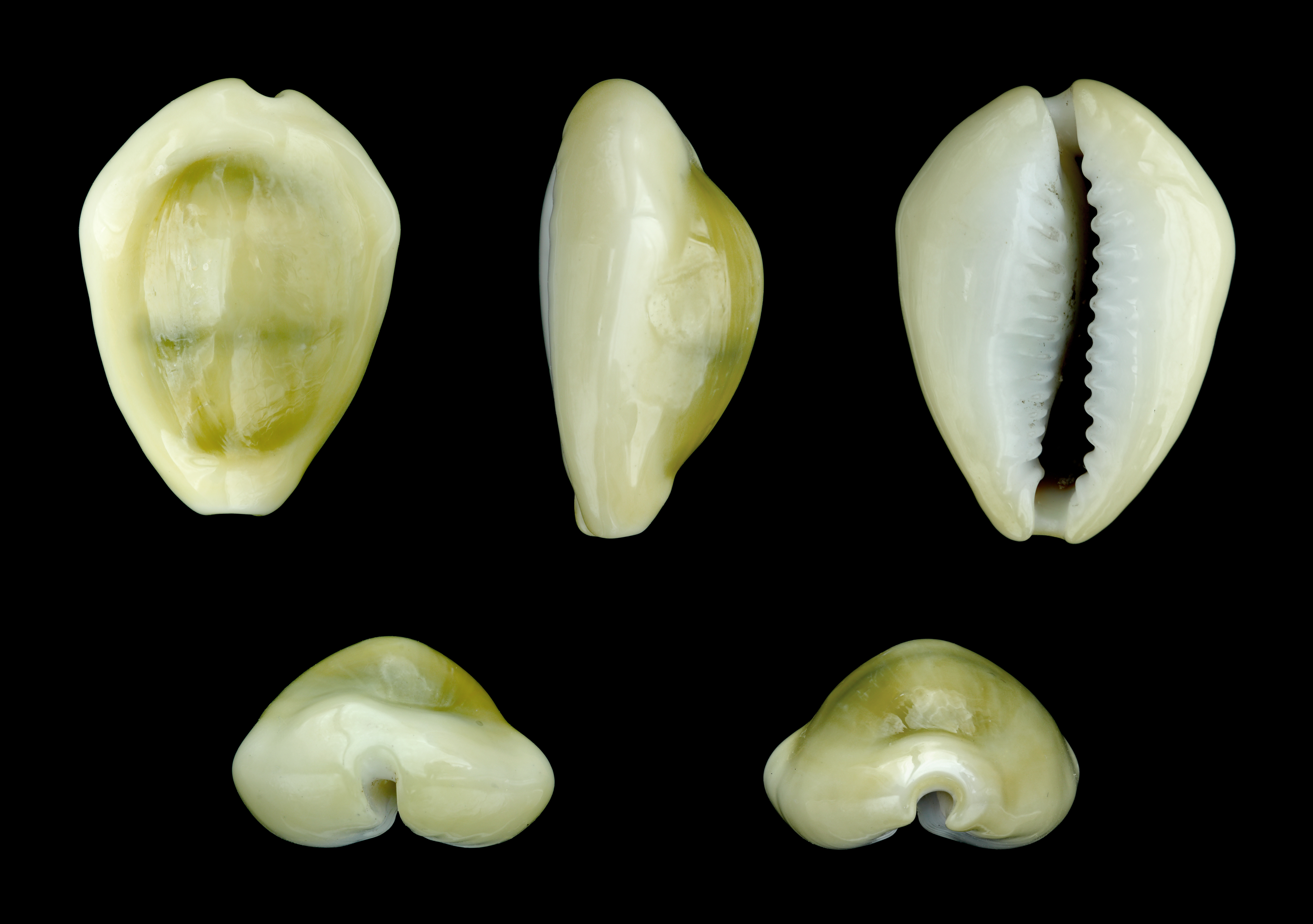
Monetaria moneta
