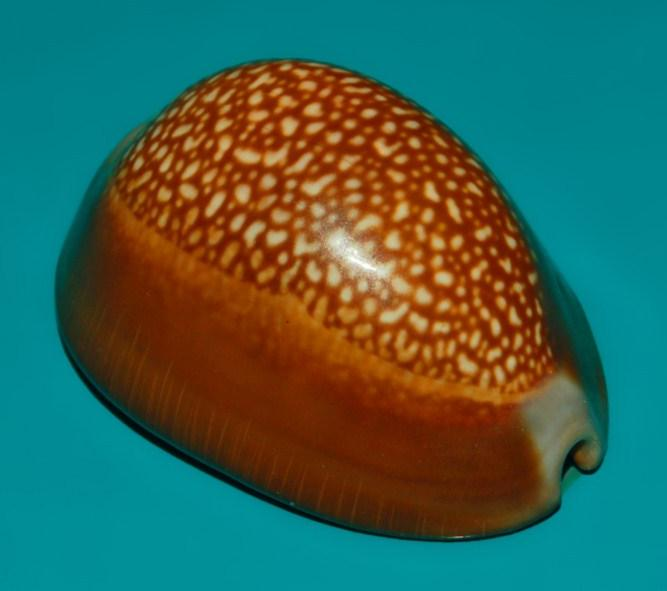
- Dorsal view of a shell of Monetaria caputdraconis from Easter Island, anterior end towards the right

Scientific classification
- Kingdom: Animalia
- Phylum: Mollusca
- Class: Gastropoda
- Subclass: Caenogastropoda
- Order: Littorinimorpha
- Family: Cypraeidae
- Genus: Monetaria
- Species: M. caputdraconis

Binomial name
- Monetaria caputdraconis (Melvill, 1888)

Synonyms
- Cypraea caputdraconis Melvill, 1888

= Monetaria caputdraconis =

Species of gastropod

Monetaria caputdraconis, common name the "dragon's-head cowry", is a species of sea snail, a cowry, a marine gastropod mollusk in the family Cypraeidae, the cowries.

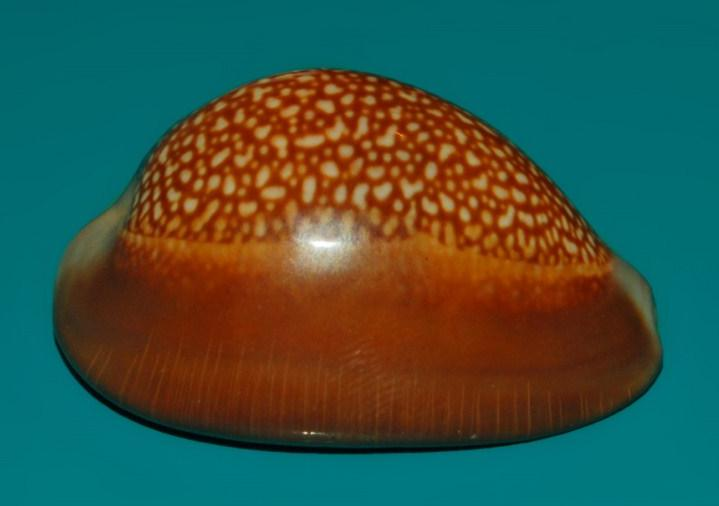
Monetaria caputdraconis, side view

The common name of this species comes from its Latin name caputdraconis, meaning "the head of the dragon".

== Description ==
The shell reaches about 15–40 millimetres (0.59–1.57 in) in length. It is pyriform with rather long teeth. The basic color of the shell is uniformly brown on its edge, with many yellowish small spots on the top of the dorsum.

== Distribution ==
This endemic species is found in the sea along Easter Island and Sala y Gomez Island, where it replaces the similar Monetaria caputserpentis. It is mainly encountered under coral rocks in the intertidal reef.
