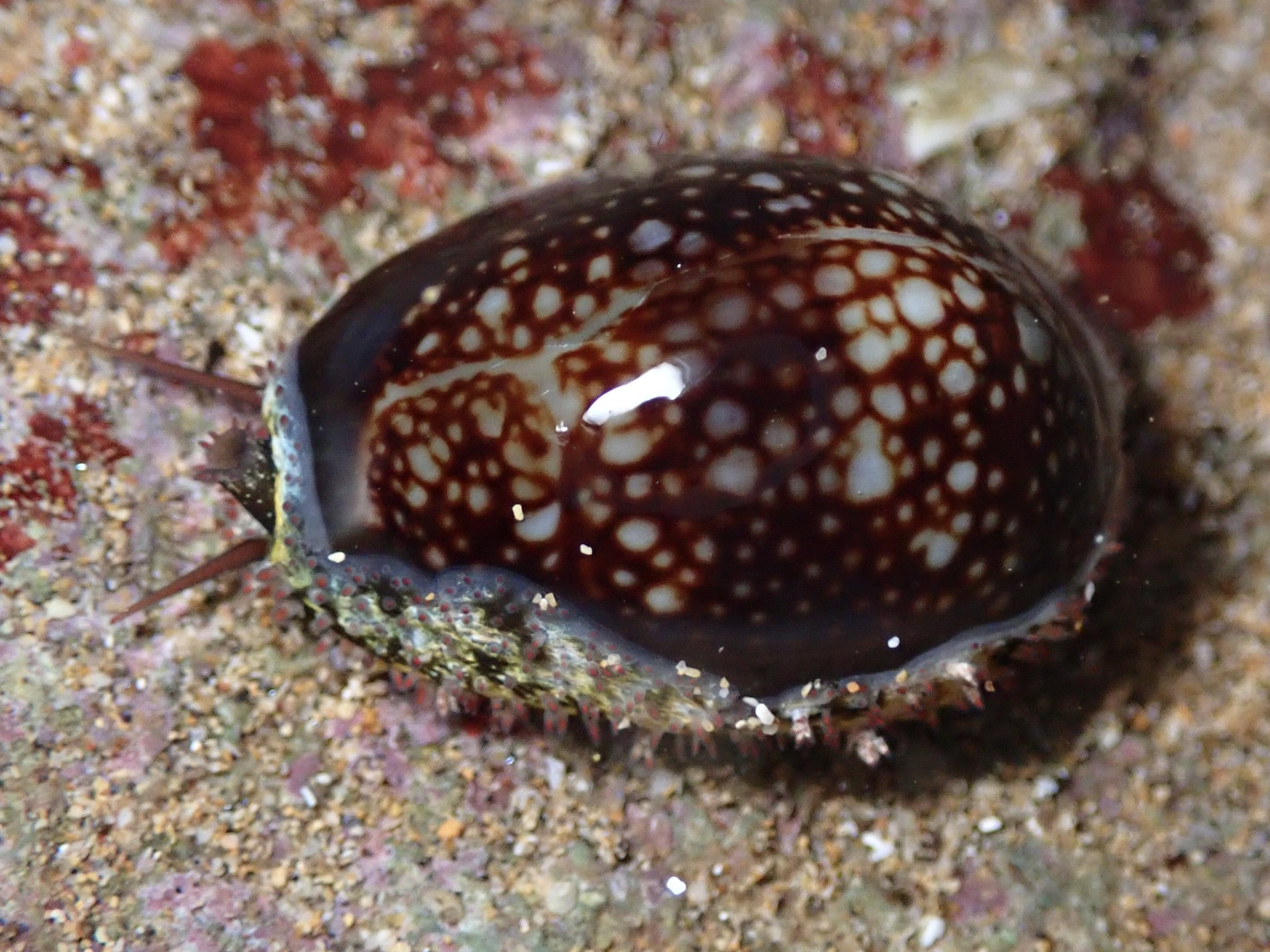
- upperside
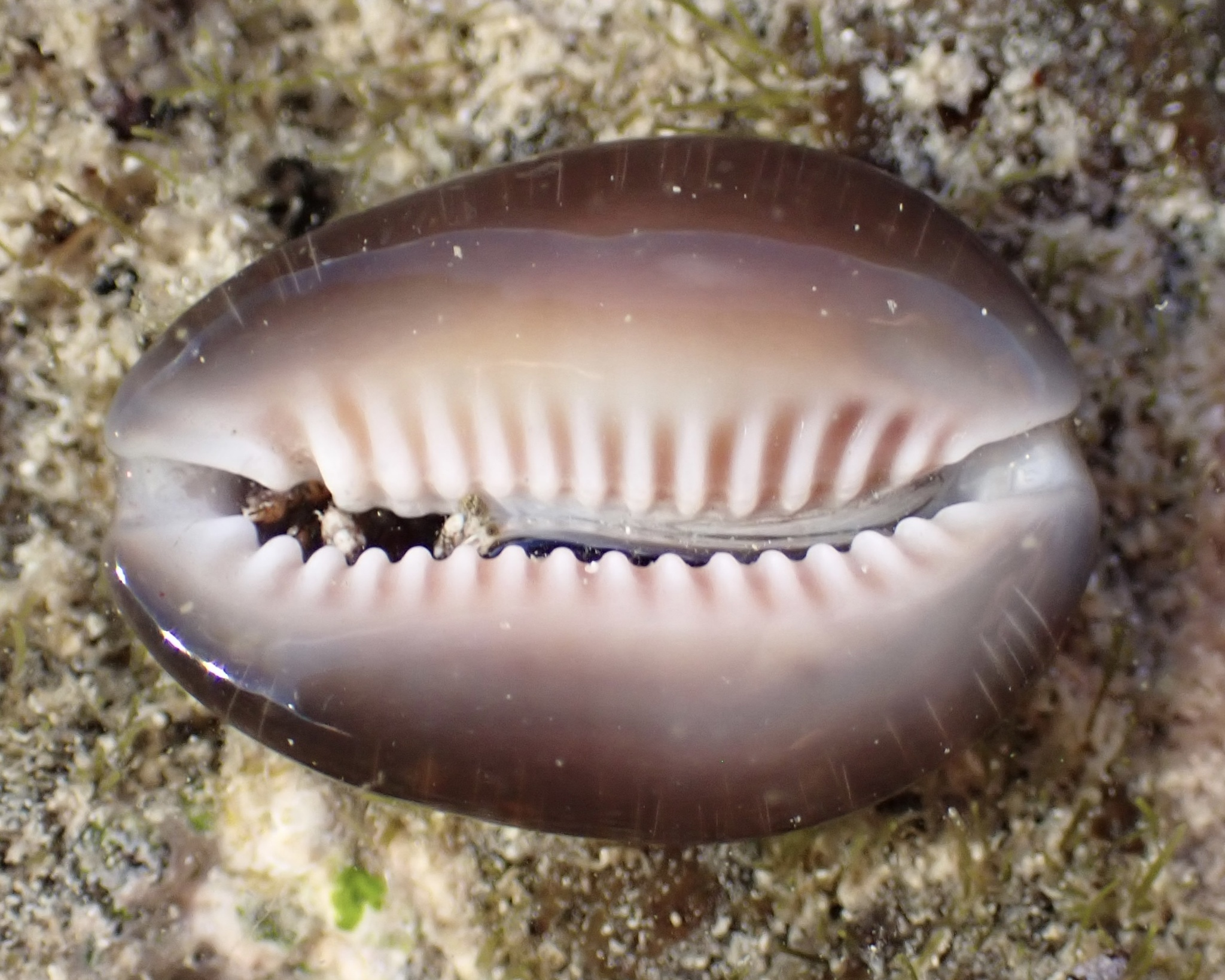
- underside

Scientific classification
- Kingdom: Animalia
- Phylum: Mollusca
- Class: Gastropoda
- Subclass: Caenogastropoda
- Order: Littorinimorpha
- Family: Cypraeidae
- Genus: Monetaria
- Species: M. caputophidii

Binomial name
- Monetaria caputophidii (Schilder, 1927)

Synonyms
- Erosaria (Ocellaria) caputophidii F. A. Schilder, 1927; Erosaria caputophidii F. A. Schilder, 1927

= Monetaria caputophidii =

Species of gastropod

Monetaria caputophidii, the Hawaiian snakehead cowrie, is a species of sea snail in the family Cypraeidae, the cowries.

It is an endemic species found in Hawaii. Its empty shell can be used to host a hermit crab.

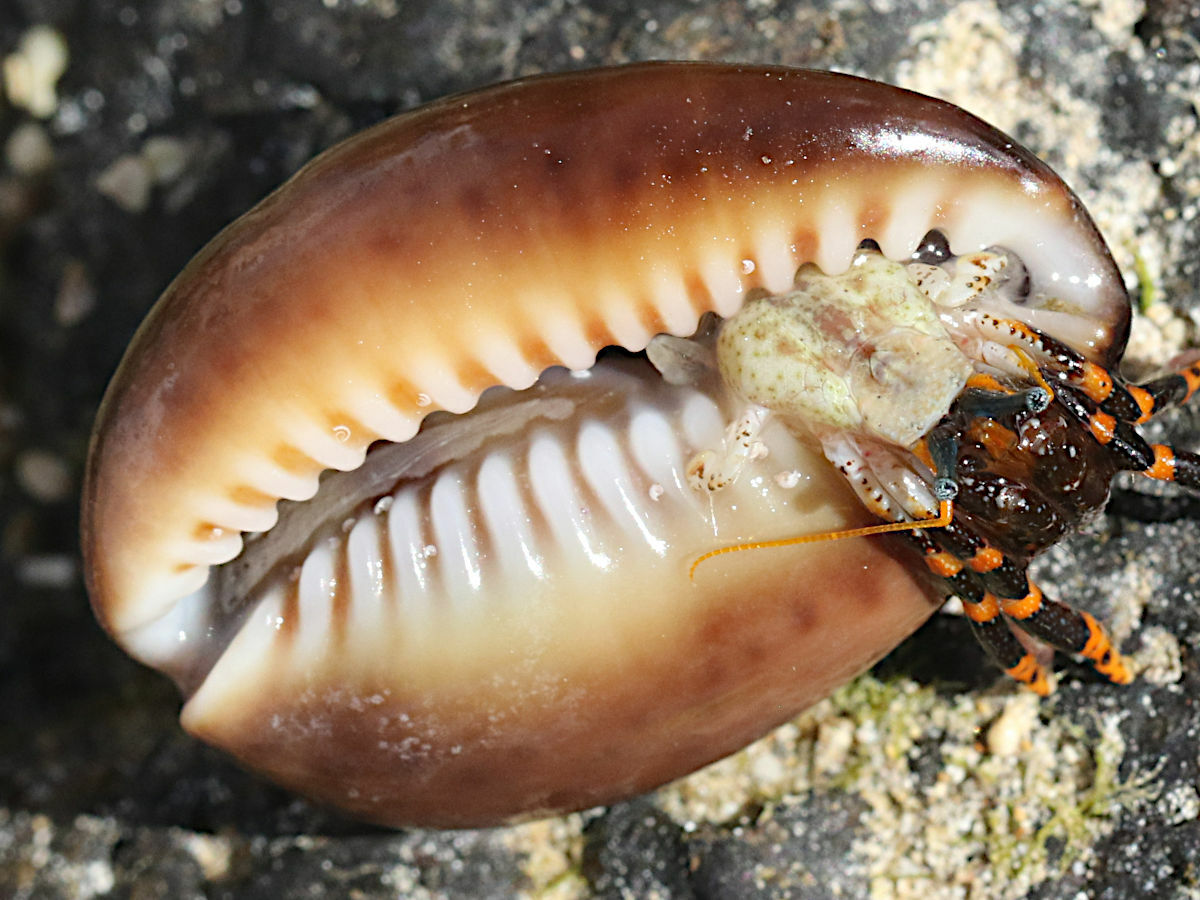
a painted hermit crab in an empty shell
