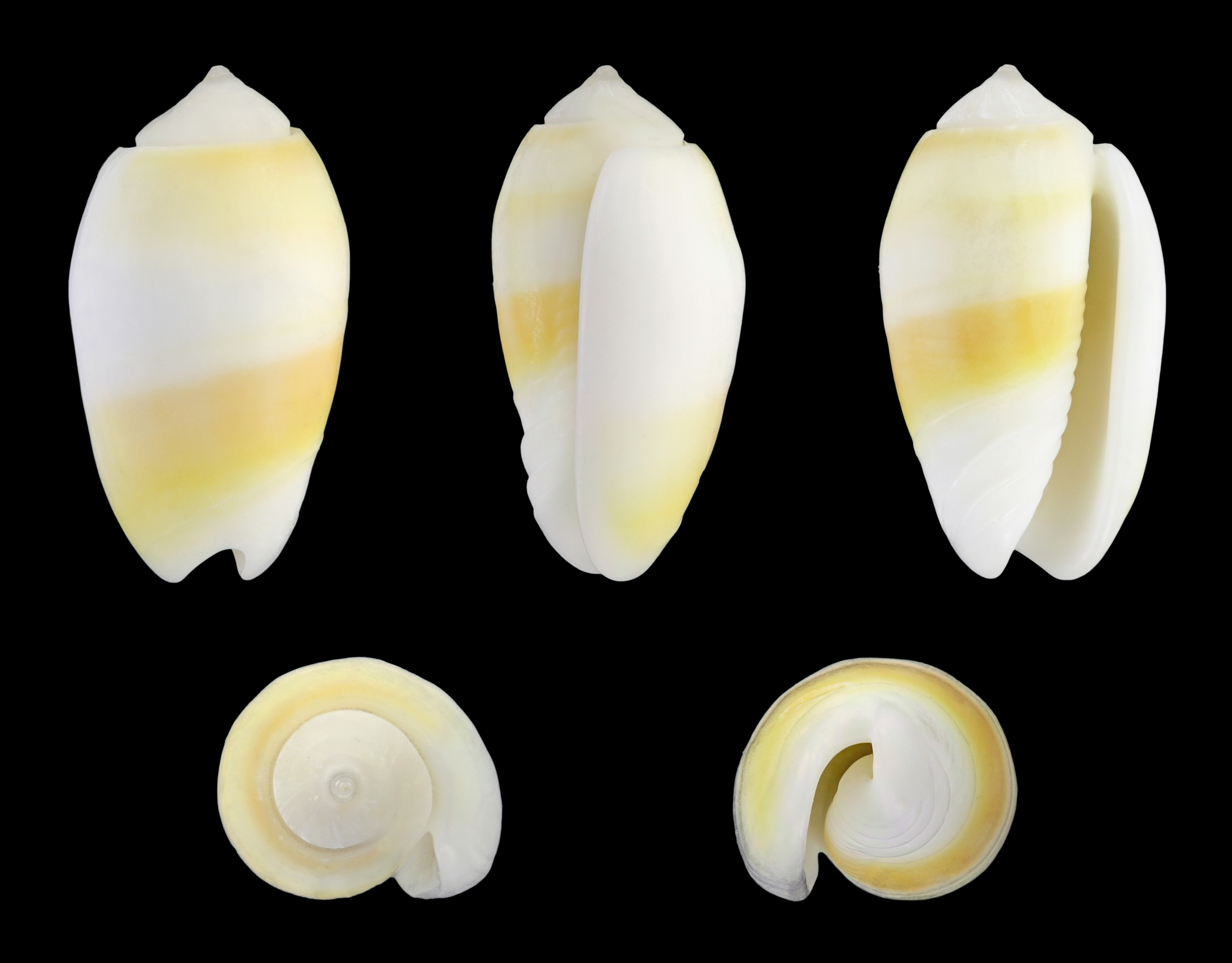
- Oliva carneola forma unizonalis, Cebu, Philippines

Scientific classification
- Kingdom: Animalia
- Phylum: Mollusca
- Class: Gastropoda
- Subclass: Caenogastropoda
- Order: Neogastropoda
- Family: Olividae
- Genus: Oliva
- Species: O. carneola

Binomial name
- Oliva carneola (Gmelin, 1791)

= Oliva carneola =

Species of gastropod

Oliva carneola, common name the carnelian olive, is a species of sea snail, a marine gastropod mollusk in the family Olividae, the olives.

== Description ==
This is a small species, ranging from 10–28 mm. The spire is low and the shell has a relatively squat appearance. Typical shells are mostly orange, yellow, or russet with lighter bands. Some forms may feature patterning like that found on many other olive species.

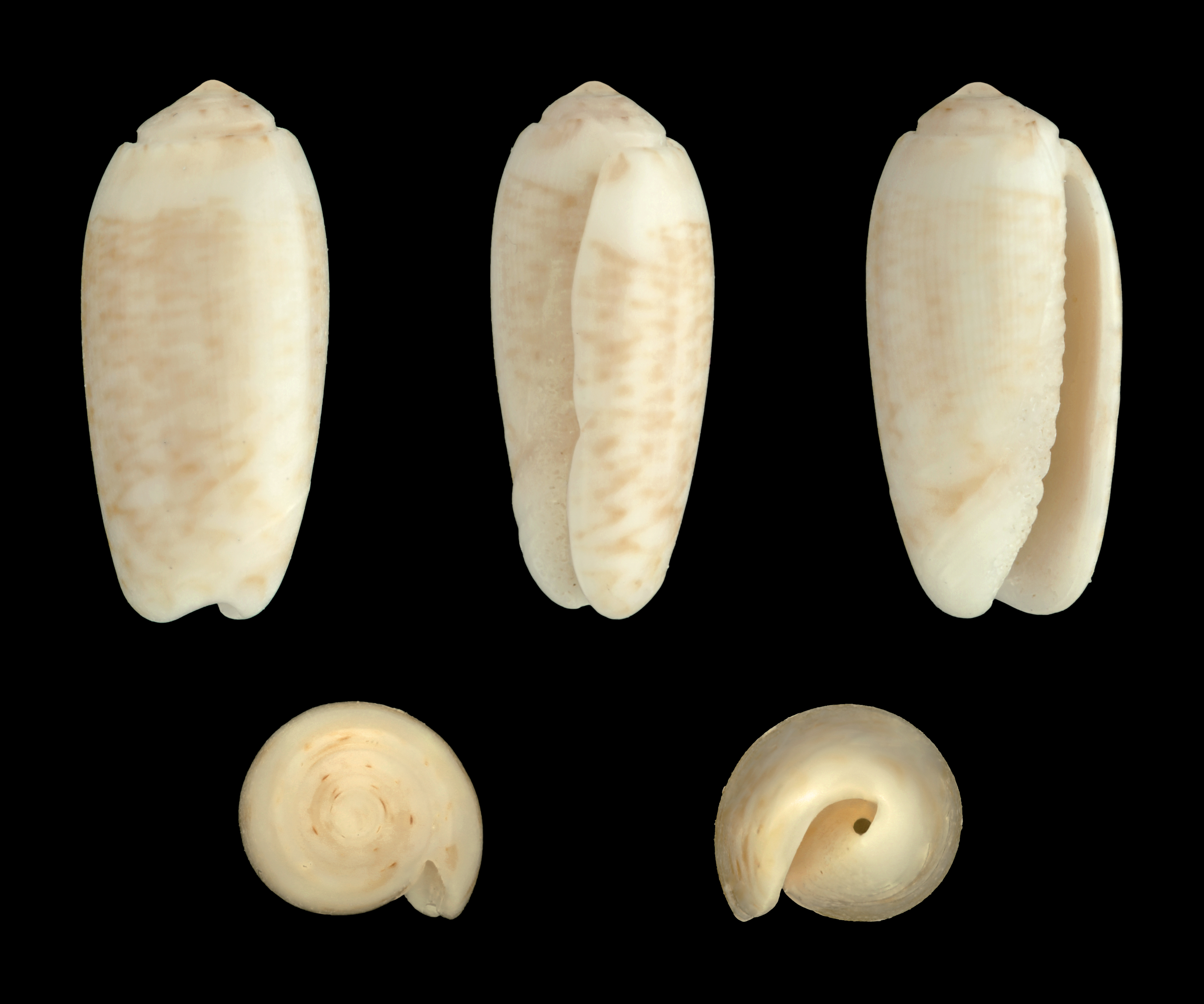
O. carneola forma andamanensis, Khao Lak, Thailand

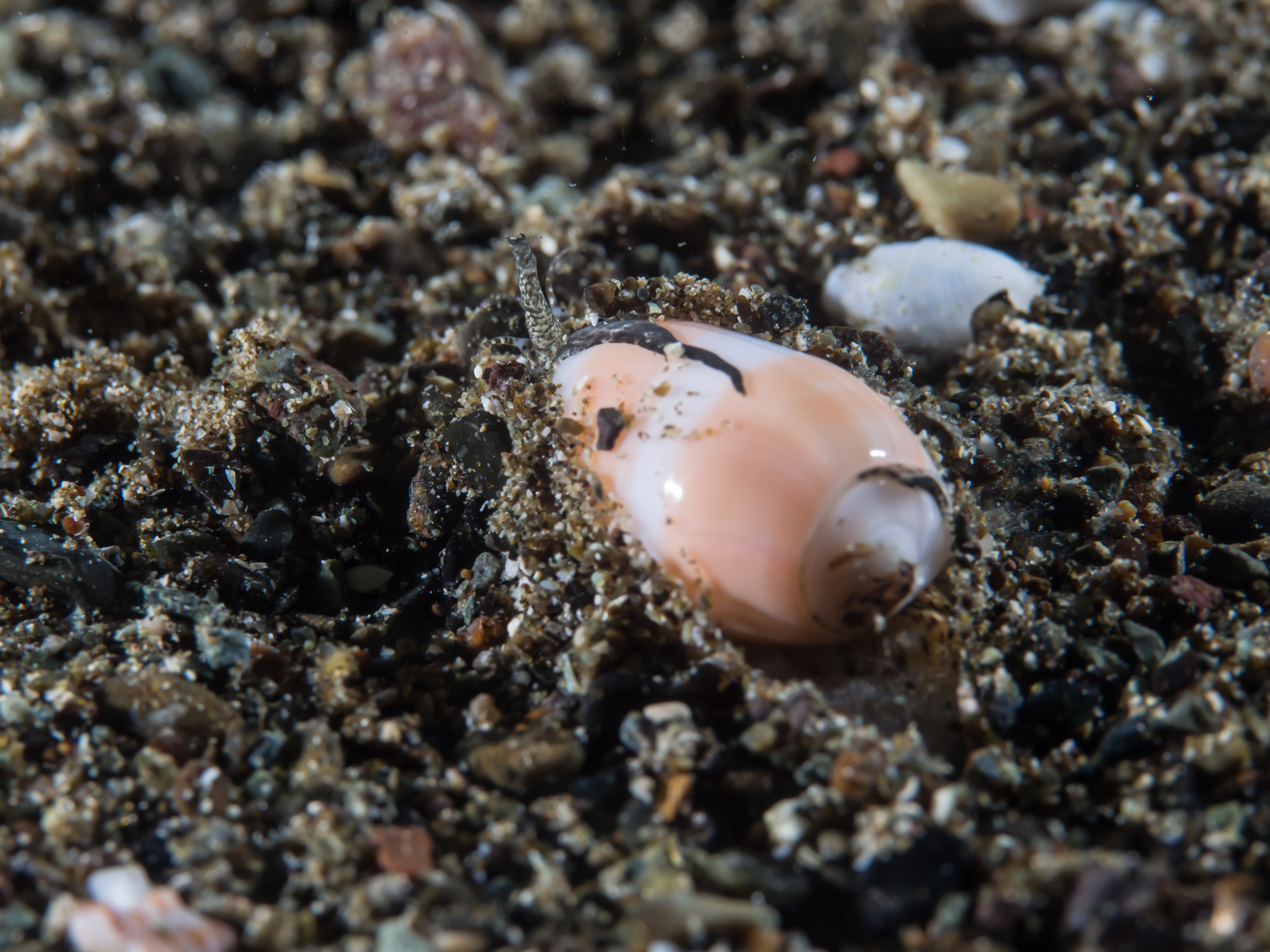
Live animal in situ

== Distribution ==
This species is found in the Indo-Pacific region, including the Philippines, Indonesia, Micronesia, and Polynesia.
