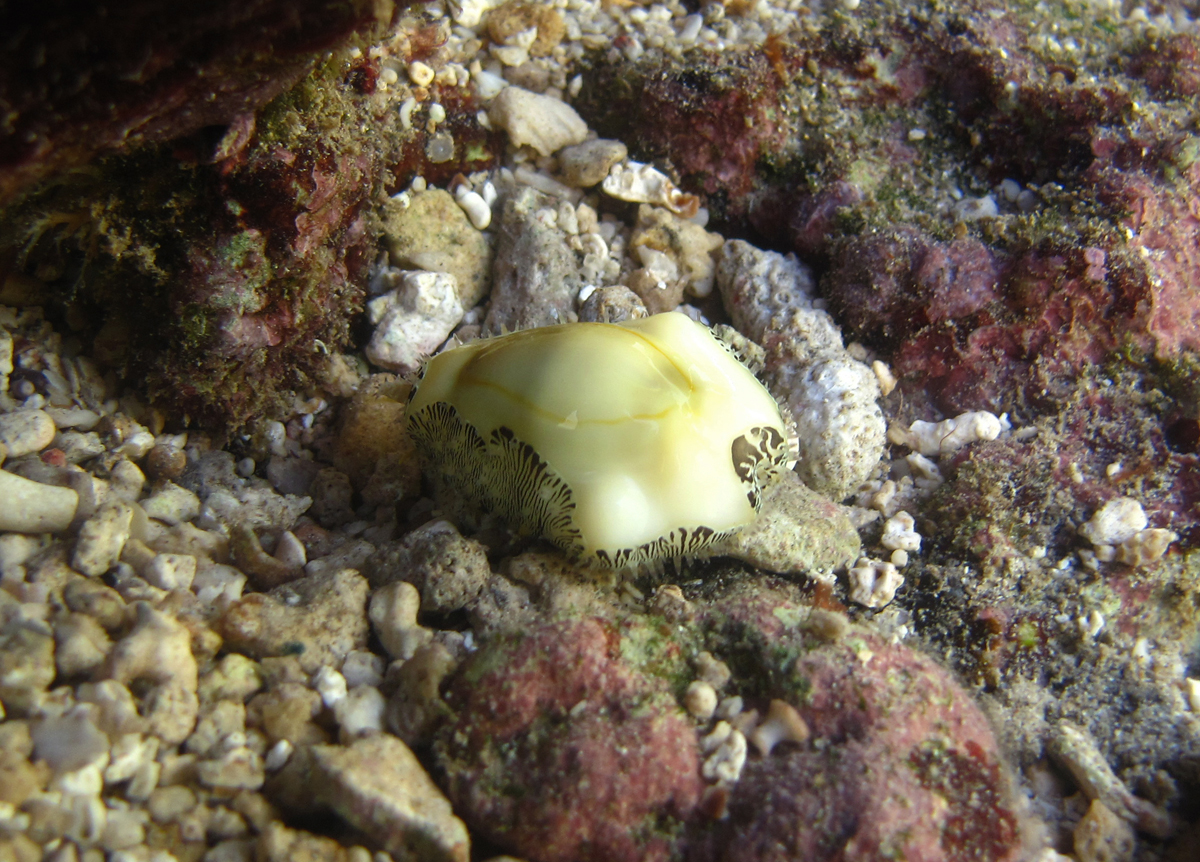
- Live animal, with mantle visible
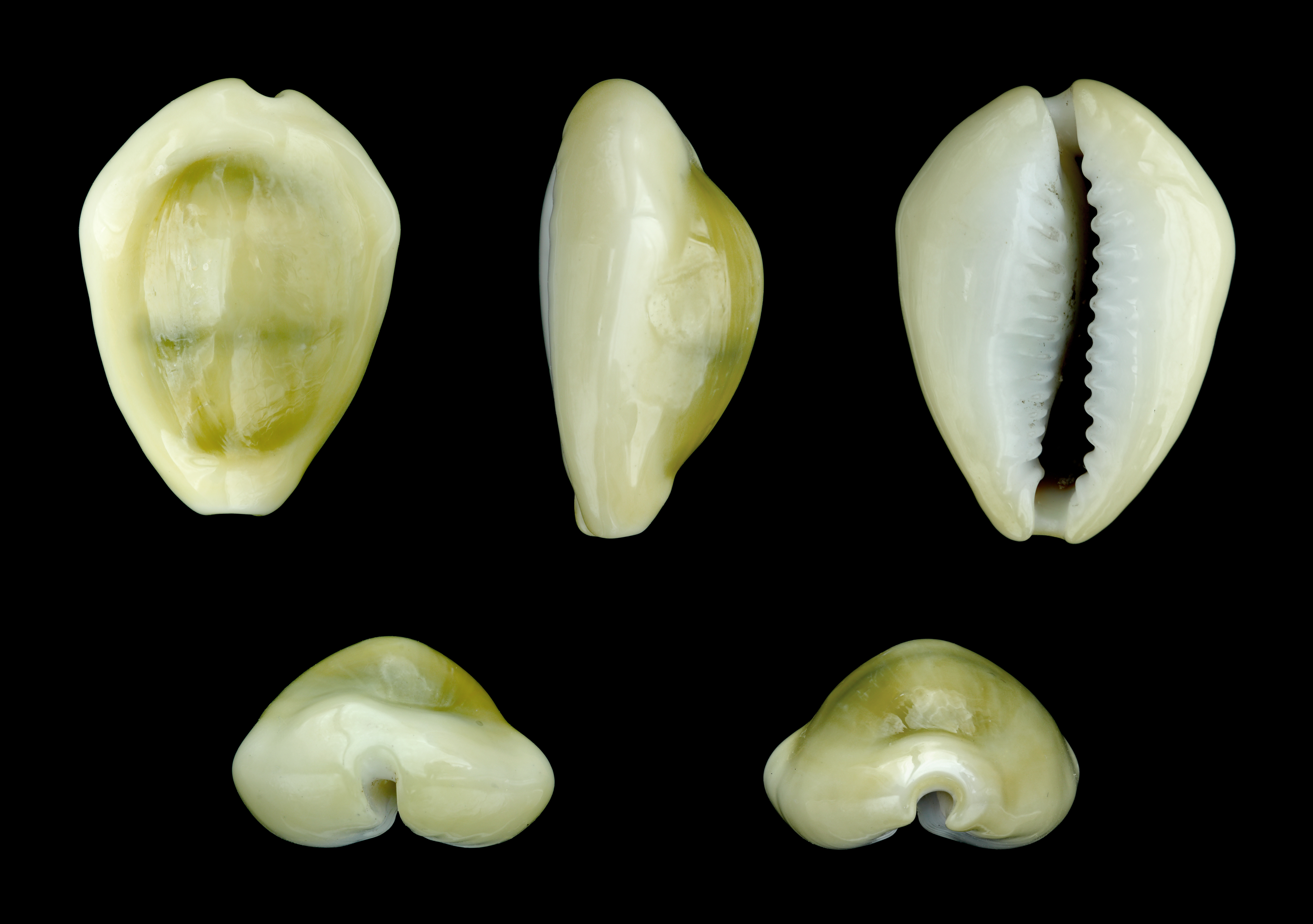
- Five views of a shell of Monetaria moneta

Scientific classification
- Kingdom: Animalia
- Phylum: Mollusca
- Class: Gastropoda
- Subclass: Caenogastropoda
- Order: Littorinimorpha
- Family: Cypraeidae
- Genus: Monetaria
- Species: M. moneta

Binomial name
- Monetaria moneta (Linnaeus, 1758)

Synonyms
- Cypraea annulifera (Coen, 1949); Cypraea barthelemyi Bernardi, 1861; Cypraea circumvallata (M. Schilder & F. A. Schilder, 1933) (Synonym); Cypraea gibbosa Schröter, 1804; Cypraea mercatorium (Rochebrunne, 1884); Cypraea moneta Linnaeus, 1758 (basionym); Cypraea monetacongo Gmelin, J.F., 1791; Cypraea numisma Röding, P.F., 1798; Cypraea gibbosa Schröter, J.S., 1804; Cypraea marginata Kiesenwetter, 1872; Erosaria moneta (Linnaeus, 1758); Erosaria monetoides Iredale, T., 1939; Monetaria britannica Schilder, F.A., 1927; Monetaria bulgarica Kojumdgieva, E., 1960; Monetaria chionella Sulliotti, G.R., 1924; Monetaria ethnographica Rochebrune, A.-T. de, 1884; Monetaria ethnographica circumvallata Schilder, F.A. & M. Schilder, 1933; Monetaria etolu Steadman & Cotton, 1943; Monetaria harrisi Iredale, 1939; Monetaria icterina (Lamarck, 1810); Monetaria isomeres Iredale, T., 1939; Monetaria mercatorium Rochebrune, A.-T. de, 1884; Monetaria pleuronectes Rochebrune, A.-T. de, 1884; Monetaria plumaria Rochebrune, 1884; Monetaria pseudomoneta C.-H. Hu, 1992; Monetaria rhomboides Schilder & Schilder, 1933; Monetaria vestimenti Rochebrune, A.-T. de, 1884; Monetaria moneta subalata (f) Schilder, F.A. & M. Schilder, 1933; Monetaria moneta endua Steadman, W.R. & B.C. Cotton, 1943; Monetaria moneta erua Steadman, W.R. & B.C. Cotton, 1943; Monetaria moneta etolu Steadman, W.R. & B.C. Cotton, 1943

= Monetaria moneta =

Money cowrie

Species of gastropod

Monetaria moneta, common name the money cowrie, is a species of small sea snail, a marine gastropod mollusk in the family Cypraeidae, the cowries.

This species is called "money cowrie" because the shells were historically widely used in many Pacific and Indian Ocean countries as shell money before coinage was in common usage.

== Description and characteristics ==
It is a quite small cowry, up to 3 cm (1.2 in), irregular and flattened, with very calloused edges and roughly subhexagonal. The colour is pale (from white to dirty beige), but the dorsum seems transparent, often greenish grey with yellowish margins, with sometimes darker transverse stripes and a delicate yellow ring. The opening is wide and white, with pronounced denticules. The mantle of the live animal is mottled with black and off-white.

The shell of Monetaria moneta varies widely in shape and colour, with some of these varieties having been described as full species. As a result, this species has numerous taxonomic synonyms.

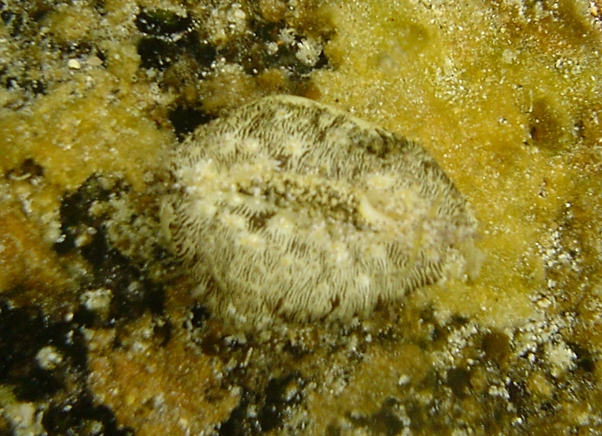
The underside of a live Monetaria moneta with the mantle partially retracted

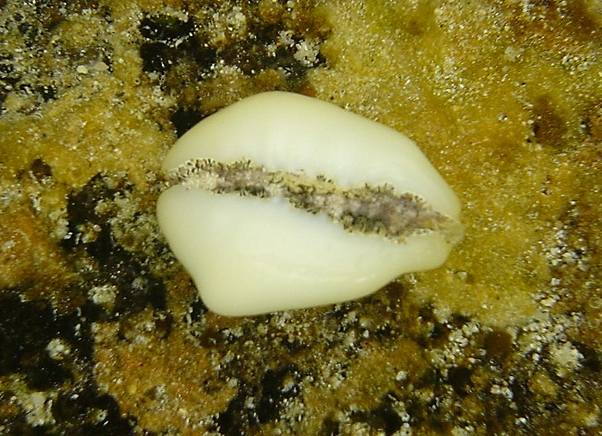
Same specimen, with mantle withdrawn

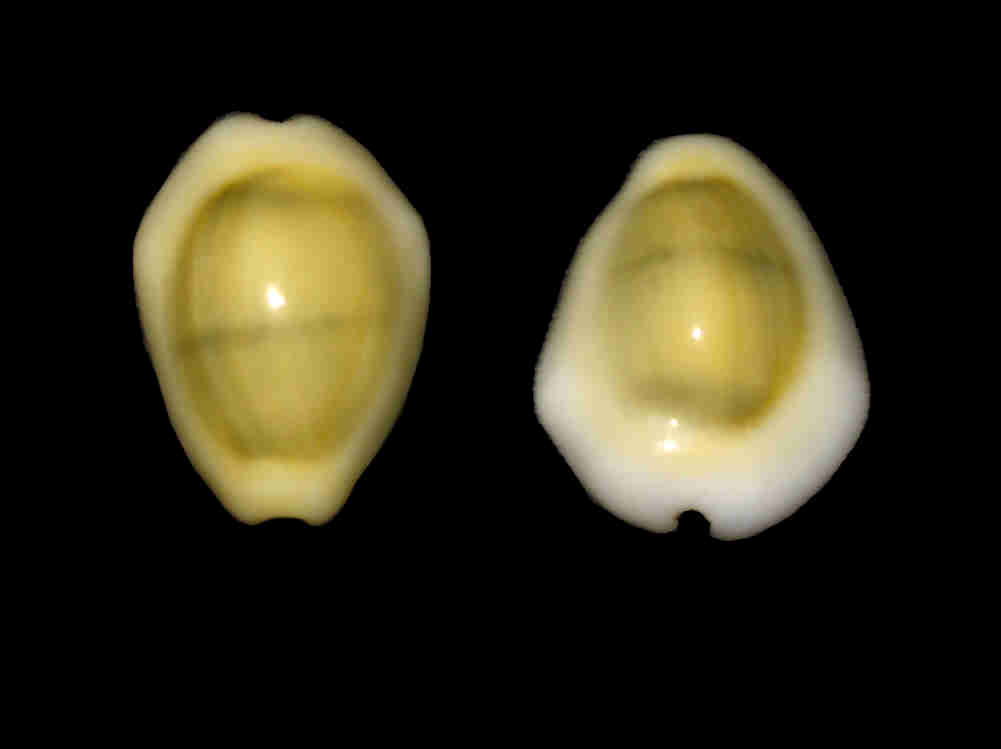
Shell

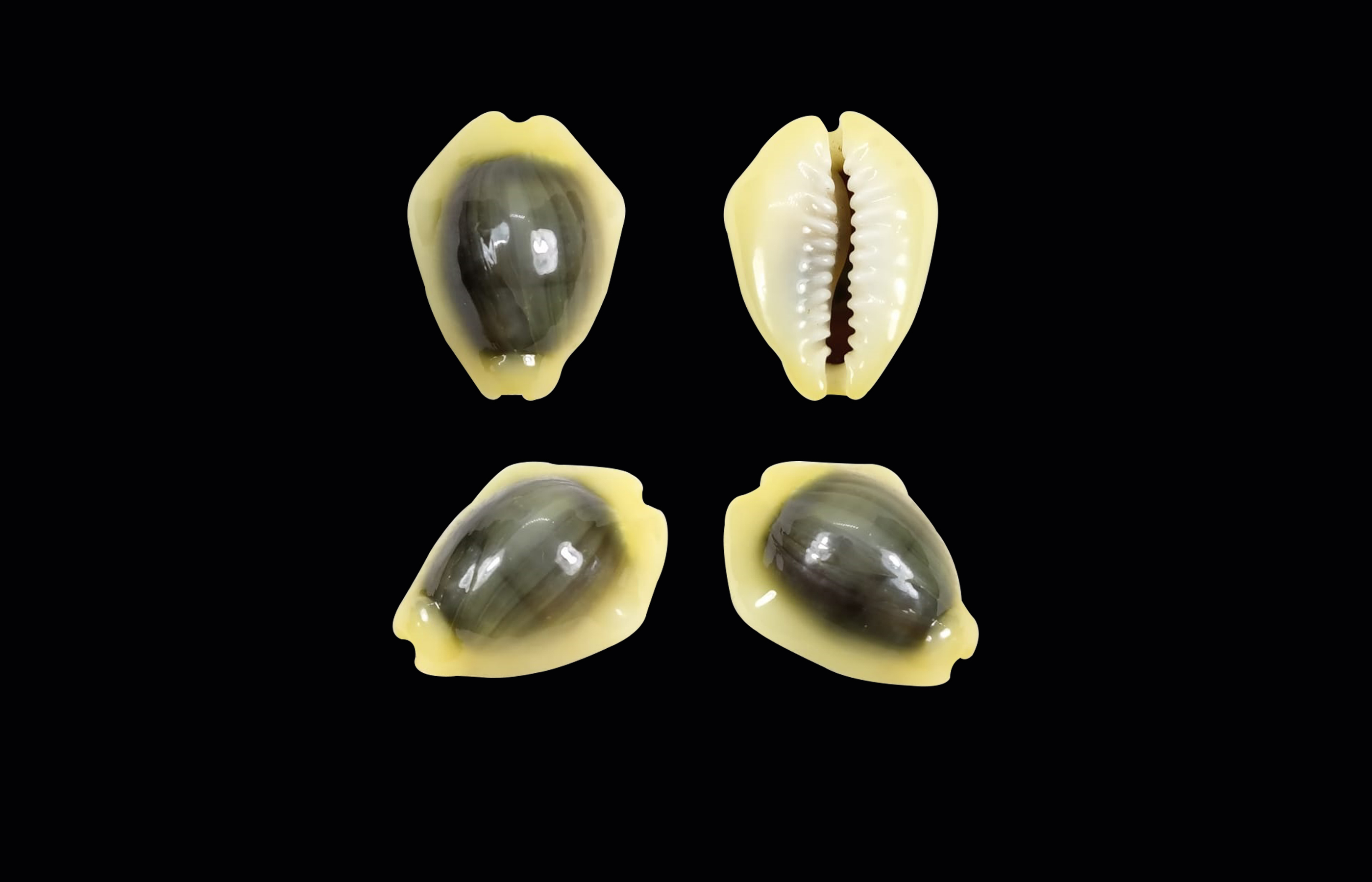
Dark-backed shell variant

Monetaria moneta icterina

== Distribution ==
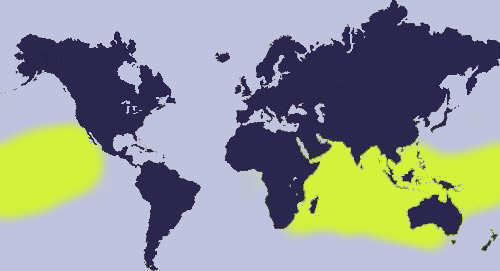
A distribution map of Monetaria moneta

This is a very common species which is found widely in Indo-Pacific tropical waters. It is present in numerous regions, including East and South Africa, Madagascar, the Red Sea and the Persian Gulf, Maldives, eastern Polynesia, Galapagos, Clipperton and Cocos islands off Central America, southern Japan, Midway and Hawaii, and northern New South Wales and Lord Howe Island.

== Habitat ==
This cowrie lives in intertidal rocky areas and shallow tide pools among sea weed, coral remains, and empty bivalve shells. It can be found on and under rocks in shallow water and on exposed reefs at low tide. It feeds on algae and marine vegetation growing on loose rocks and pieces of dead coral.

== Subspecies and forms ==
Subspecies:

- Monetaria moneta icterina (Lamarck, 1810)
- Monetaria moneta monetserpentis Lorenz, Chiapponi & Mont, 2012
- Monetaria moneta tuberculosa (Quoy & Gaimard, 1834)
- Monetaria moneta barthelemyi (f) Bernardi, M., 1861

Forms:

- Monetaria moneta form erosaformis
- Monetaria moneta form harrisi Iredale, T., 1939
- Monetaria moneta form icterina Lamarck, J.B.P.A. de, 1810
- Monetaria moneta form rhomboides Schilder, F.A. & M. Schilder, 1933
- Monetaria moneta form tuberculosa Quoy, J.R.C. & J.P. Gaimard, 1834

== Human uses ==
The shell is used in jewellery and in other decorative items such as baskets and wall hangings.

=== As money ===
Shells of this cowrie were commonly used as a medium of exchange in many areas of Africa, Asia, and the Pacific islands until the late 19th century.

The Maldives provided the main source of cowrie shells, throughout Asia and parts of the East African coast. Huge amounts of Maldivian cowries were introduced into Africa by slave traders. It was also traded to Native Americans by European settlers.

=== For divination ===
The shell is used in divination rituals in some African religions. In the State of Kerala, in India, special money cowrie shells (which are known in Malayalam as കവിടി Kavidi) are used for divination as a practice of Hindu astrology known as prasnam. During Prasnam, the astrologer draws shells of Monetaria moneta while reciting mantras and prayers. The number of cowries drawn is tied to a planet, and its astrological position provides an answer to a given question or the basis to a prediction.
