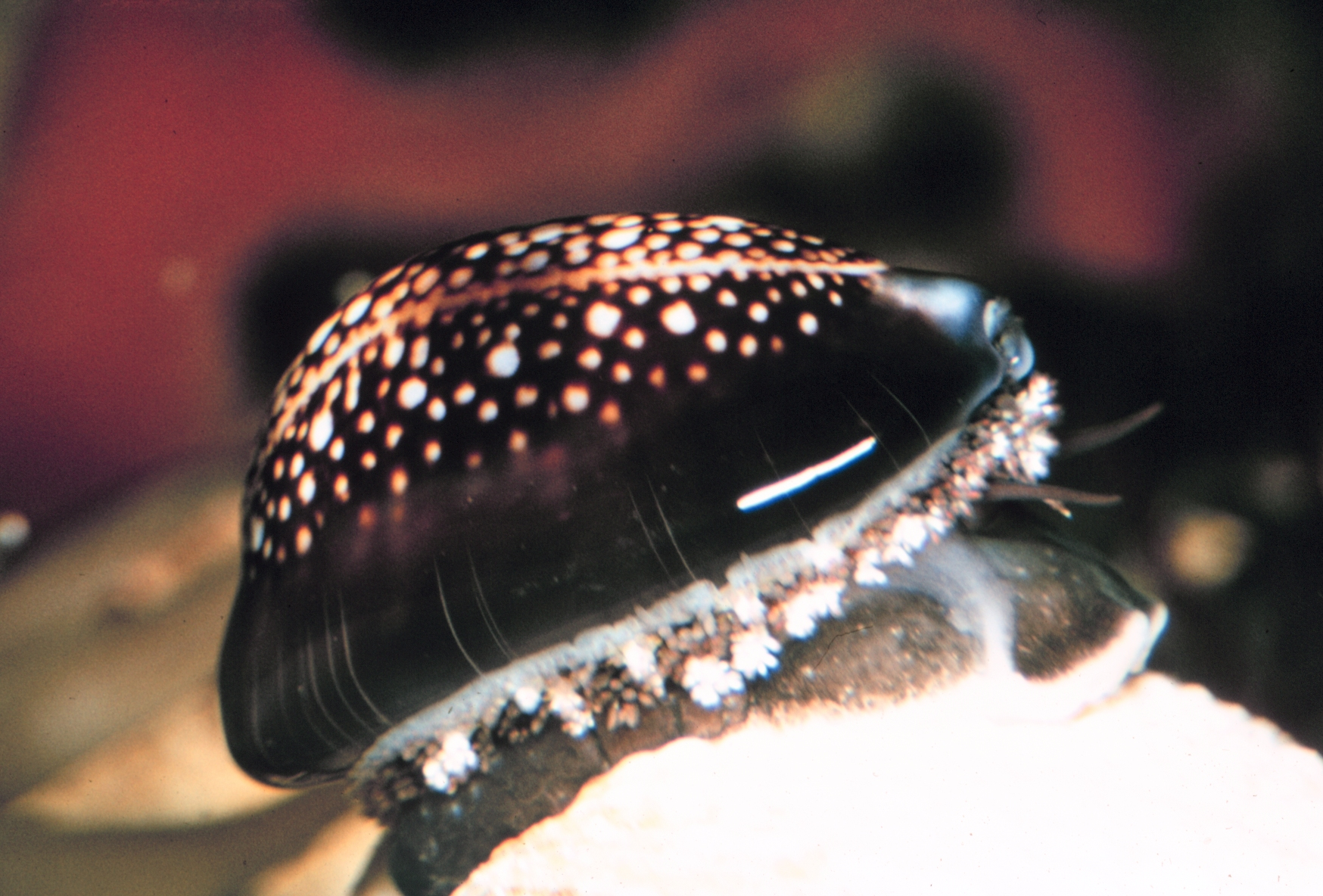
- A live individual of Monetaria caputserpentis, anterior end towards the right
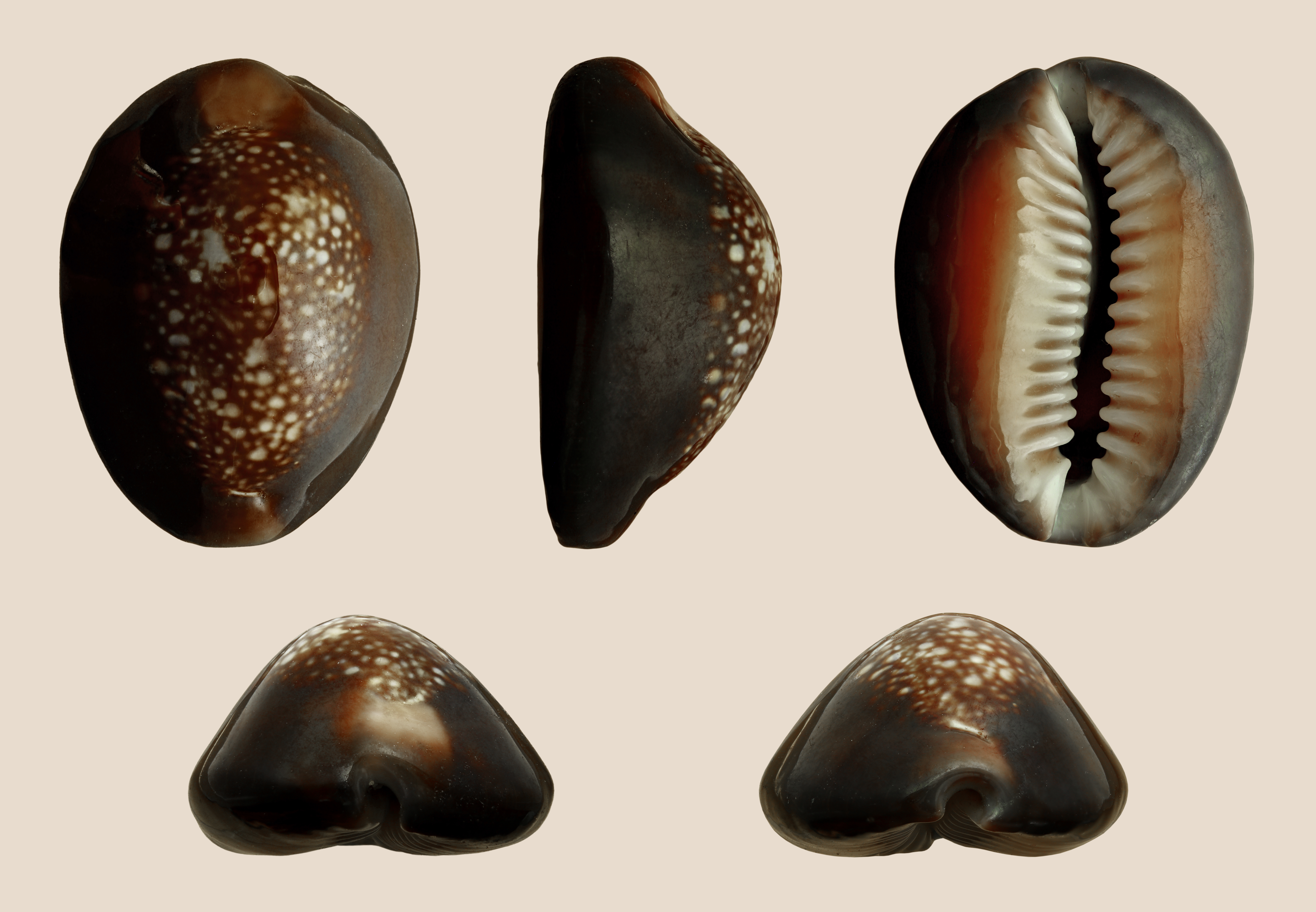
- A shell of Monetaria caputserpentis

Scientific classification
- Kingdom: Animalia
- Phylum: Mollusca
- Class: Gastropoda
- Subclass: Caenogastropoda
- Order: Littorinimorpha
- Family: Cypraeidae
- Genus: Monetaria
- Species: M. caputserpentis

Binomial name
- Monetaria caputserpentis (Linnaeus, 1758)

Synonyms
- Cypraea mauritiana Linnaeus, 1758; Cypraea reticulum Gmelin, 1791; Cypraea bandata Perry, 1811; Cypraea albella Lamarck, 1822; Cypraea caputanguis Philippi, 1849; Cypraea caputanguis var. sophia Brazier, 1897; Cypraea caputserpentis Linnaeus, 1758; Cypraea caputserpentis var. caputcolubri Kenyon, 1898; Cypraea caputserpentis var. candidata Sullioti, 1924; Cypraea caputserpentis var. argentata Dautzenberg & Bouge, 1933; Erosaria caputserpentis (Linnaeus, 1758); Erosaria (Ravitrona) caputserpentis kenyonae Schilder & Schilder, 1938; Erosaria (Ravitrona) caputserpentis mikado Schilder & Schilder, 1938; Erosaria (Ravitrona) caputserpentis var. albosignata Coen, 1949

= Monetaria caputserpentis =

Species of gastropod

Monetaria caputserpentis, common name the serpent's-head cowry or snakehead cowry, is a species of cowry, a sea snail, a marine gastropod mollusk in the family Cypraeidae, the cowries.

== Distribution ==
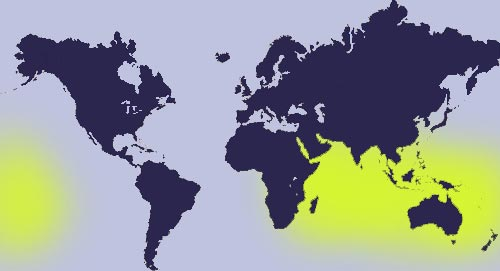
Distribution map of Monetaria caputserpentis

This species occurs in the Red Sea, Indian Ocean, tropical Indo-West Pacific, Australia and the Philippines. This sea snail lives on corals, rock reefs and rocky shores from the intertidal zone down to depths of 200 m.

== Description ==
The basic color of the shell is reddish-brown, with many whitish dots on the top of the dorsum, which sometimes shows a clear longitudinal line. The underside is light beige.

Frequently these shells are sold with a purple top, which is achieved by dipping the dorsum in acid.

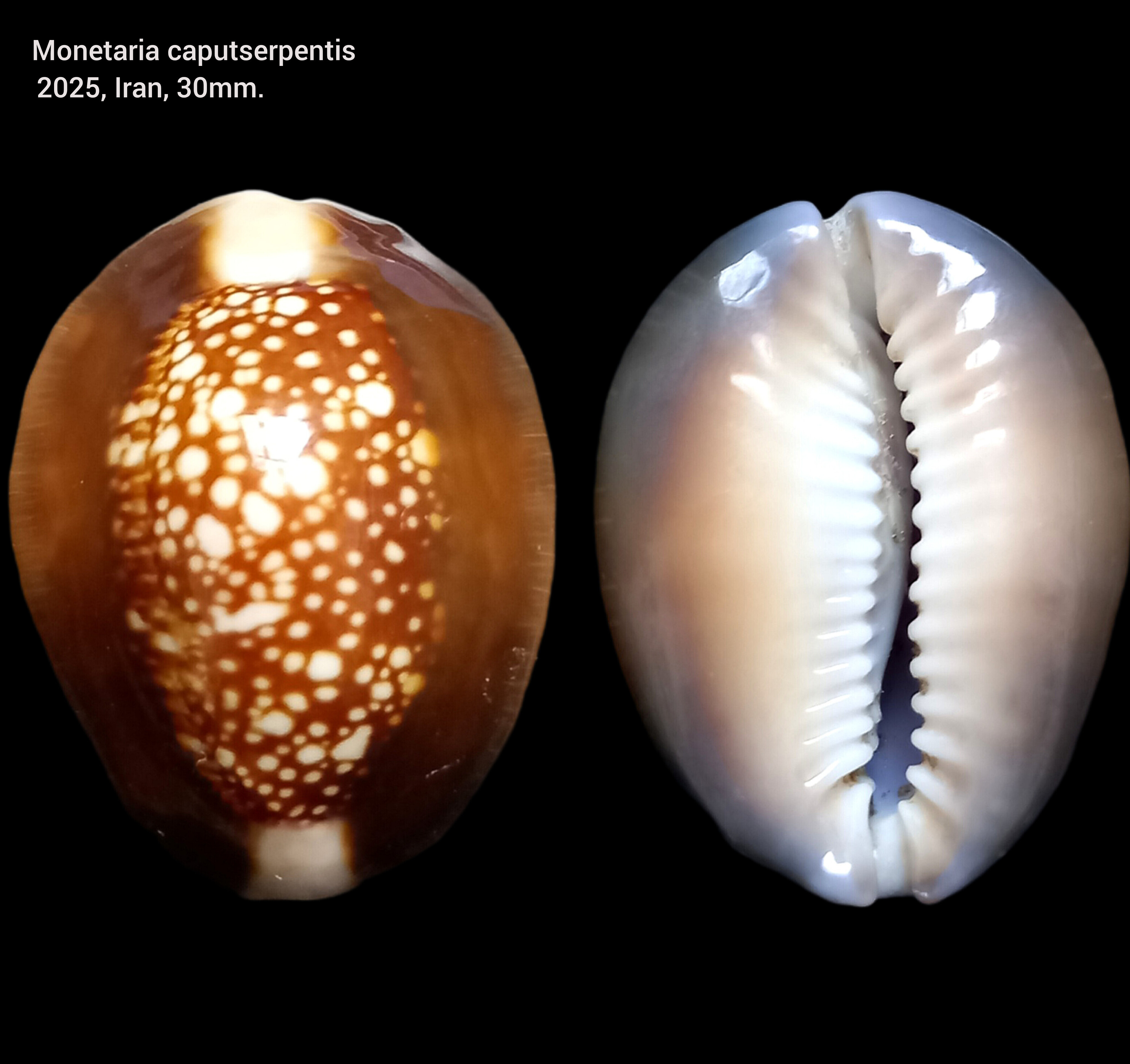
Monetaria caputserpentis

== Synonyms ==
In literature and on various websites the synonym Cypraea caputserpentis is still commonly used.

Video of two living cowries; Erosaria helvola (seen 1st) & Monetaria caputserpentis (last)

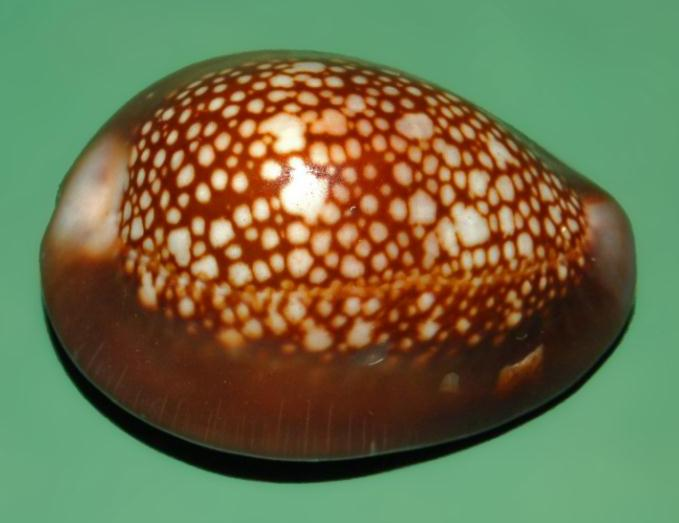
Monetaria caputserpentis

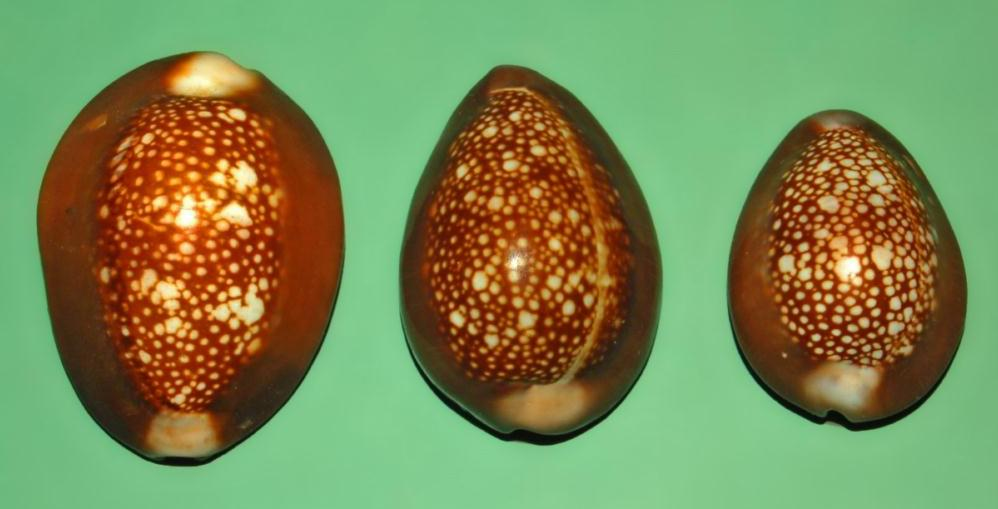
Monetaria caputserpentis
