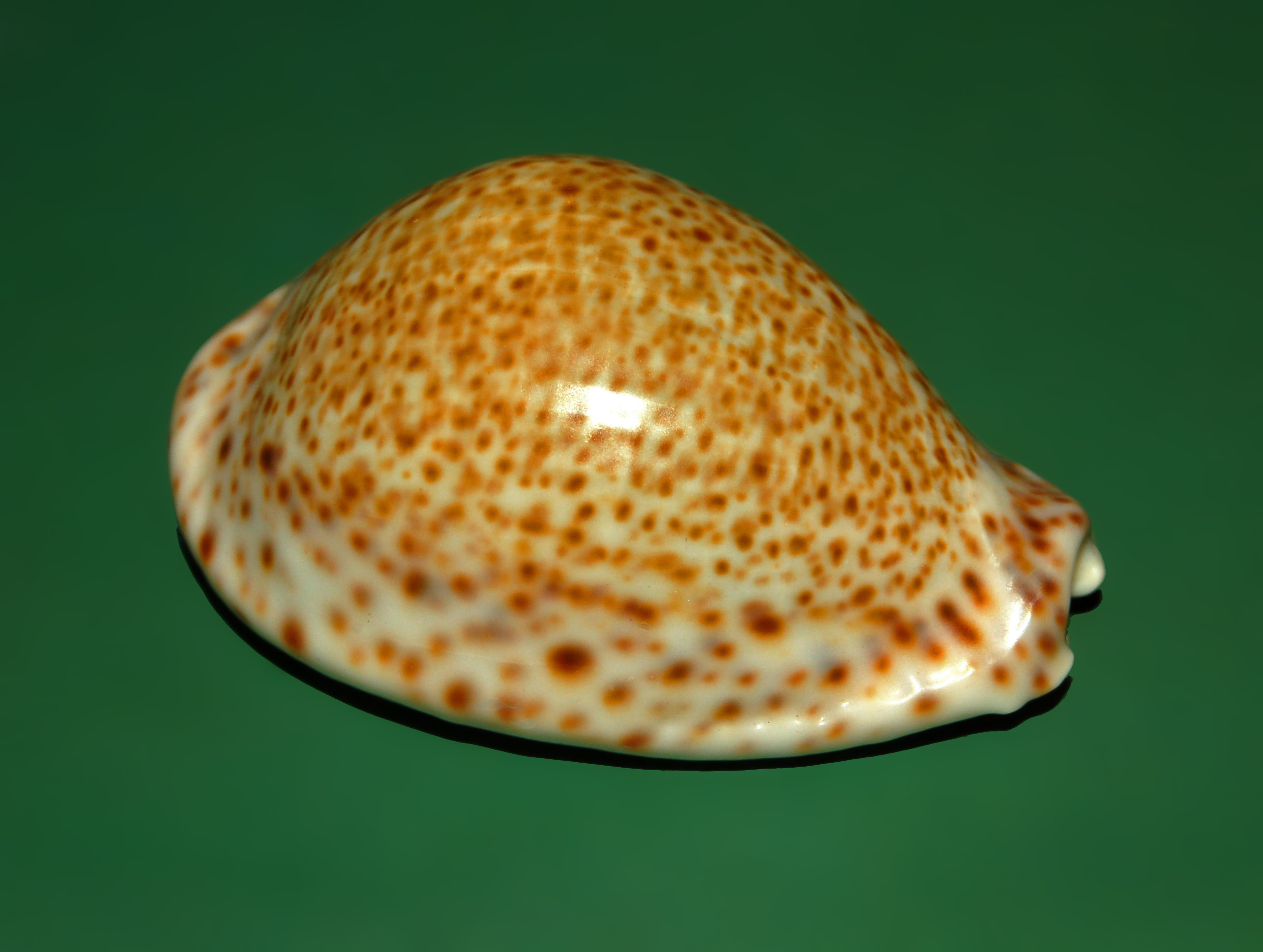
- A shell of Naria turdus, anterior end towards the right

Scientific classification
- Kingdom: Animalia
- Phylum: Mollusca
- Class: Gastropoda
- Subclass: Caenogastropoda
- Order: Littorinimorpha
- Family: Cypraeidae
- Genus: Naria
- Species: N. turdus

Binomial name
- Naria turdus (Lamarck, 1810)

Synonyms
- Cypraea arenosa Dillwyn, 1823; Cypraea facifer (Iredale, 1935); Cypraea foedata Sulliotti, 1911; Cypraea nivea Gray, 1824; Cypraea ovata Perry, 1811; Cypraea pardalina Dunker, 1852; Cypraea phyllidis Shaw, 1915; Cypraea pyriformis G. B. Sowerby II, 1870 (junior synonym); Cypraea raripunctata Sulliotti, 1911; Cypraea turdus Lamarck, 1810 (basionym); Cypraea turdus var. alba G. B. Sowerby I, 1832 (junior synonym); Cypraea turdus var. pyriformis G. B. Sowerby II, 1870 (junior synonym); Cypraea turdus winckworthi Schilder & Schilder, 1938; Cypraea turdus zanzibarica Sullioti, 1911; Cypraea zanzibarica Sulliotti, 1911; Erosaria miyokoae Habe, T. & S. Kosuge, 1970; Erosaria raripuncta Sulliotti, G.R., 1911; Erosaria turdus (Lamarck, 1810); Erosaria turdus distinguenda Schilder, 1927; Erosaria turdus kuwaitensis Heiman, 2014; Erosaria turdus micheloi Chiapponi, 2009; Erosaria turdus pardalina (Dunker, 1852); Erosaria turdus singeri Heiman, 2014; Erosaria turdus somaliaensis Heiman, 2014; Erosaria turdus turdus (Lamarck, 1810); Erosaria turdus winckworthi F. A. Schilder & M. Schilder, 1938; Erosaria turdus zanzibarica (Sullioti, 1911); Monetaria hamyi Rochebrune, 1884

= Naria turdus =

Species of gastropod

Naria turdus, common name : the thrush cowrie, is a species of sea snail, a cowry, a marine gastropod mollusk in the family Cypraeidae, the cowries.

== Subspecies ==
The following forms or varieties have been described:

- Naria turdus dilatata (Dunker, R.W., 1852)
- Naria turdus distinguenda (Lamarck, J.B.P.A. de, 1810)
- Naria turdus micheloi Chiapponi, 2009
- Naria turdus pardalina (Dunker, R.W., 1852)
- Naria turdus turdus (Lamarck)
- Naria turdus winkworthi Schilder, F.A. & M. Schilder, 1938

== Description ==
The shells of these cowries reach on average 30–38 millimetres (1.2–1.5 in) of length, with a minimum size of 16 millimetres (0.63 in) and a maximum size of 62 millimetres (2.4 in). They are quite variable in pattern and color. The shape is more or less oval, the dorsum surface is smooth and shiny, the basic color is whitish, yellowish or greenish, with small brown spots all over, becoming larger on the sides. The interior of the shell, visible through the aperture, may be light purple. The subspecies Naria turdus dilatata usually bears a large irregular patch on the dorsum. The margins are white, with several brown dots and a pronounced labial 'callus'. The base is white or pale pink, sometimes with a small brown mark in the middle. The long and wide aperture shows about 15 teeth on the columellar and labial teeth. The shells of Naria turdus are externally quite similar to Naria lamarckii. In the living cowries the mantle is yellowish or beige, with long tree-shaped brown papillae.

== Distribution ==
The thrush cowry is distributed in the Red Sea, in the Gulf of Oman and in the North West of the Indian Ocean, along Pakistan, India, in the East Africa (Comores, Eritrea, Kenya, Madagascar, Mozambique, Oman, Somalia, Tanzania), in the East Coast of South Africa and - as a non-indigenous species - in European waters and in the Mediterranean Sea (Lampedusa, Israel, Djerba Island in Tunisia, Libya, Egypt), where it has been introduced through the Suez Canal.

This species has also been found as an introduced species in the Caribbean starting in the early 2020s. It has been observed in Aruba, Bonaire, Venezuela, Costa Rica, and Puerto Rico.

== Habitat ==
These cowries live in intertidal shallow waters at 2–10 metres (6 ft 7 in – 32 ft 10 in) of depth. In the Indian Ocean they prefer the coral reef, while in the Mediterranean Sea they can be found on algal turf or sandy and muddy sea bed.

== Gallery ==
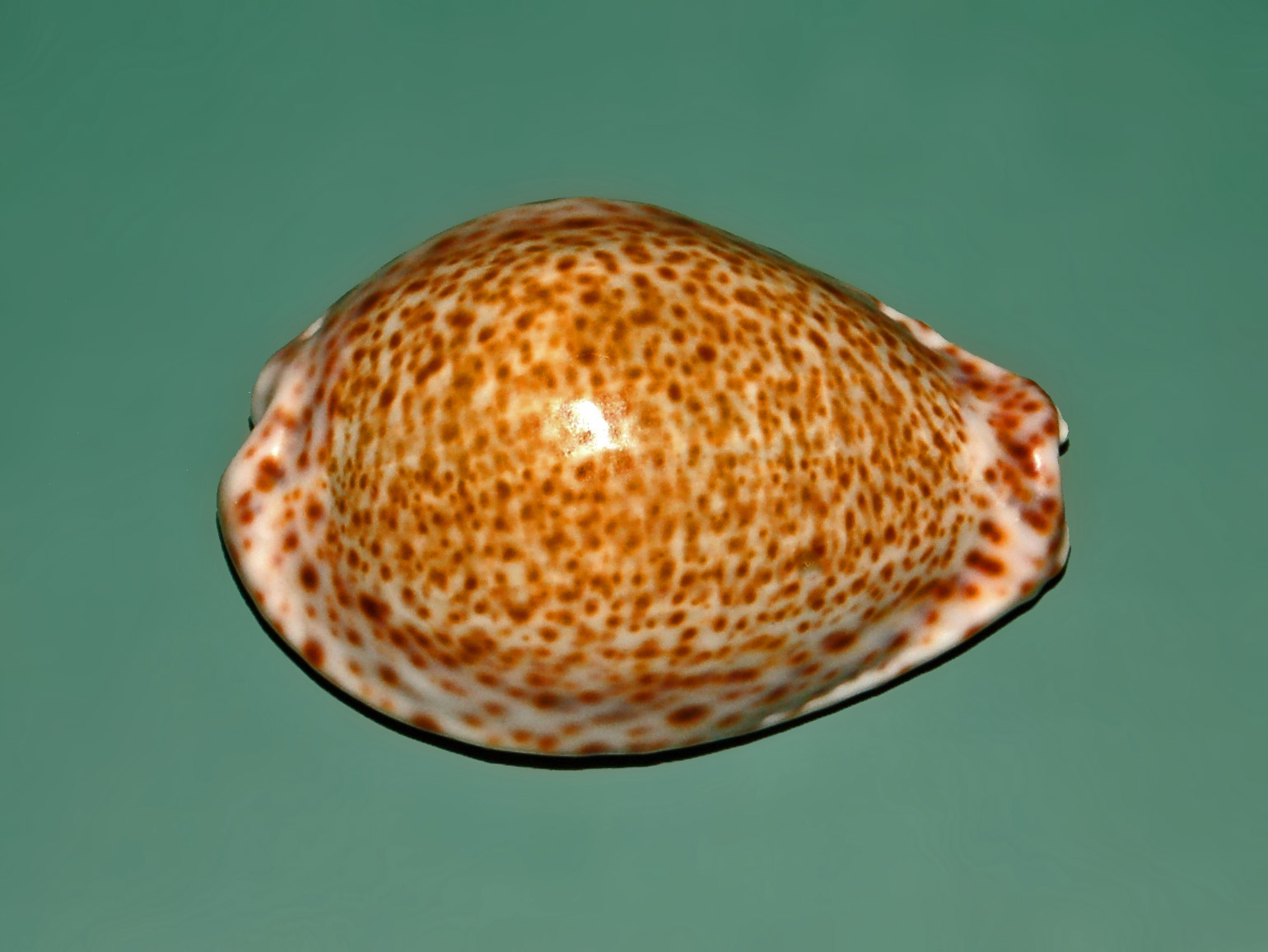
A shell of Naria turdus, dorsal view, anterior end towards the right

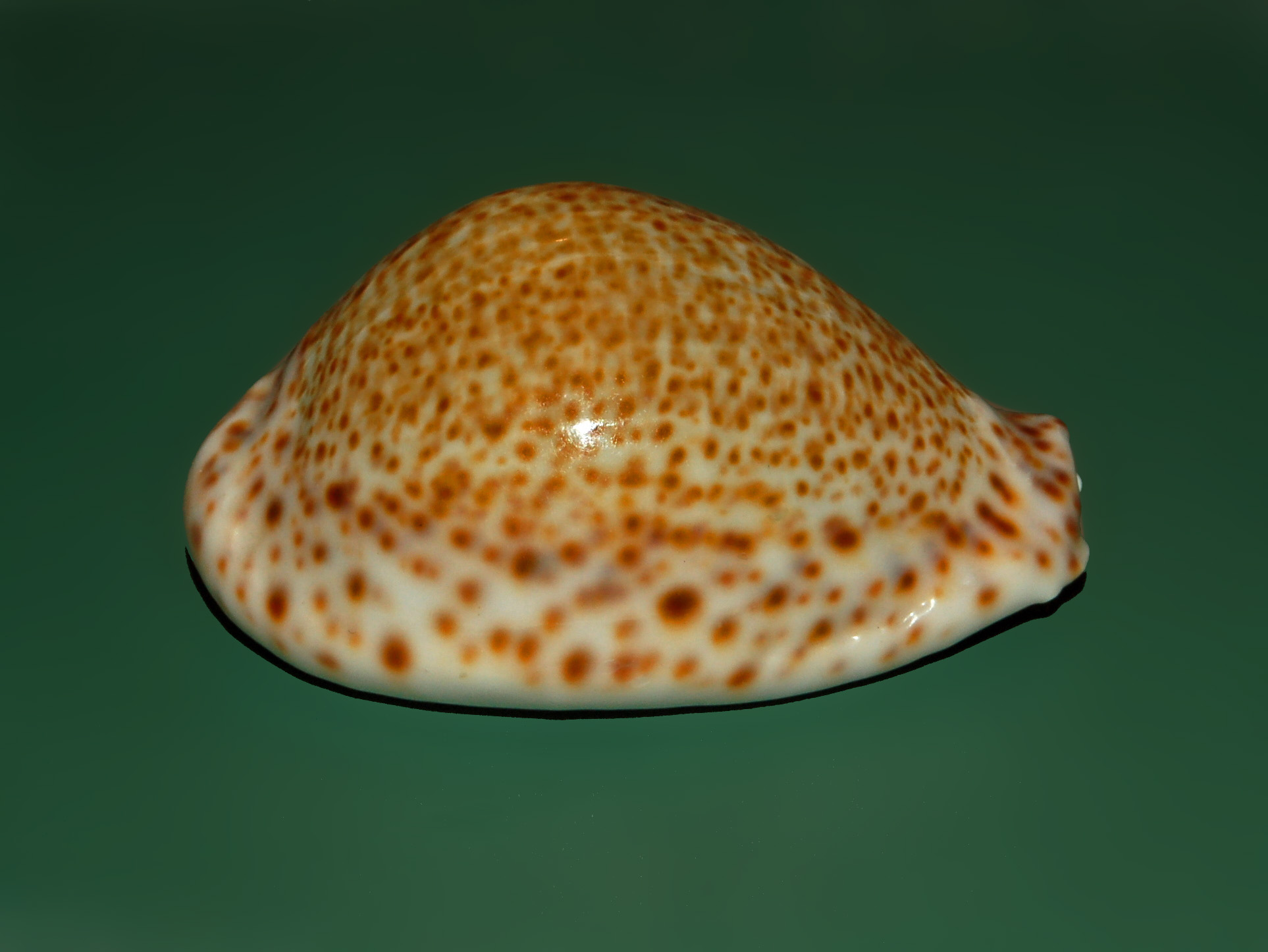
A shell of Naria turdus, lateral view, anterior end towards the right

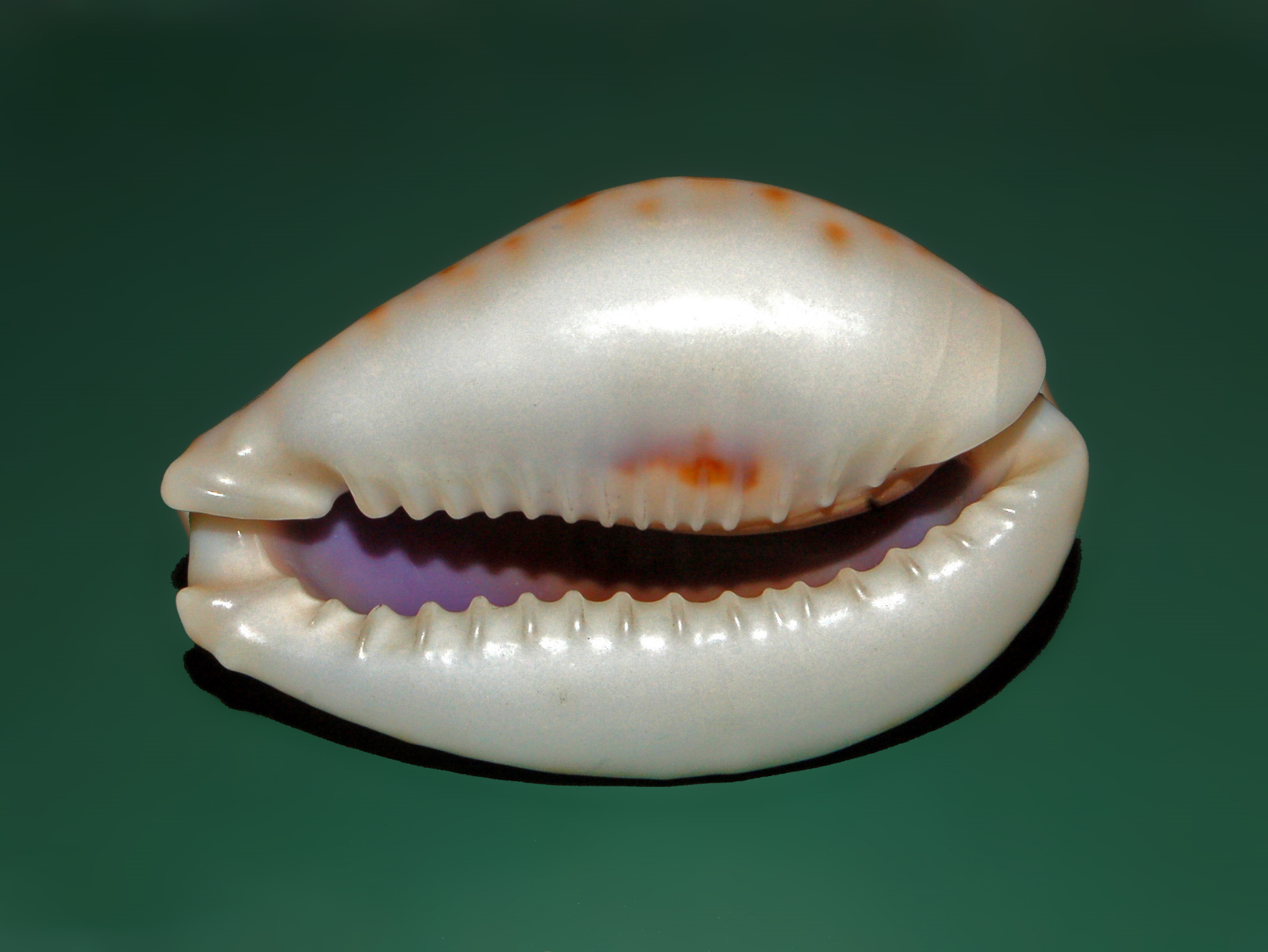
A shell of Naria turdus, ventral view, anterior end towards the left
