= Americoliva =

Scientific classification
- Kingdom: Animalia
- Phylum: Mollusca
- Class: Gastropoda
- Subclass: Caenogastropoda
- Order: Neogastropoda
- Family: Olividae
- Subfamily: Olivinae
- Genus: Americoliva; Petuch, 2013

Type species
- Oliva (Americoliva)Petuch, 2013

Synonyms
- Oliva (Americoliva) Petuch, 2013

Genus of gastropods

Americoliva is a genus of sea snails in the family Olividae, the olives. It is sometimes considered a subgenus of Oliva. It is a sympatric genus of Vullietoliva.

== Description ==
Members of Americoliva have long, well-developed hairline flammules on their filament channels.

== Species ==
Americoliva contains the following species:

- Americoliva bollingi (Clench, 1934): synonym of Americoliva nivosa bollingi (Clench, 1934): synonym of Oliva nivosa bollingi Clench, 1934
- † Americoliva carolinensis (Conrad, 1862)
- Americoliva circinata (Marrat, 1871): synonym of Oliva circinata Marrat, 1871
- Americoliva deynzerae (Petuch & Sargent, 1986): synonym of Oliva deynzerae Petuch & Sargent, 1986
- † Americoliva edwardsi (Olsson, 1967)
- Americoliva grovesi Petuch & R.F. Myers, 2014: synonym of Oliva grovesi (Petuch & R. F. Meyers, 2014) (original combination)
- Americoliva harpularia (Lamarck, 1811): synonym of Oliva harpularia Lamarck, 1811
- Americoliva matchetti Petuch & R. F. Myers, 2014: synonym of Oliva matchetti (Petuch & R. F. Meyers, 2014) (original combination)
- Americoliva mcleani Petuch & R.F. Myers, 2014: synonym of Oliva mcleani (Petuch & R. F. Meyers, 2014) (original combination)
- Americoliva mooreana (Petuch, 2013): synonym of Oliva mooreana Petuch, 2013
- Americoliva murielae (Olsson, 1967) † : synonym of Americoliva nivosa murielae (Olsson, 1967) †
- Americoliva nivosa (Marrat, 1871): synonym of Oliva nivosa Marrat, 1871
- Americoliva polpasta (Duclos, 1833): synonym of Oliva polpasta Duclos, 1833
- Americoliva recourti Petuch & R. F. Myers, 2014: synonym of Oliva recourti (Petuch & R. F. Meyers, 2014) (original combination)
- Americoliva reticularis (Lamarck, 1811): synonym of Oliva reticularis Lamarck, 1811
- Americoliva sayana (Ravenel, 1834): synonym of Oliva sayana Ravenel, 1834
- Americoliva sunderlandi (Petuch, 1987): synonym of Oliva sunderlandi Petuch, 1987
