= Foxi =

Foxi may refer to:

== Entertainment ==
- Fix and Foxi, a German comics magazine
- Fix & Foxi (TV channel), a German children's entertainment brand
- Fix & Foxi and Friends, an animated adaption of Rolf Kauka's comic series Fix & Foxi

== People ==
- Foxi Kéthévoama (born 1986), Central African footballer
- Xiong Foxi (1900–1965), Chinese playwright

== Species ==
- Adelophis foxi, a species of oviparous colubrid snake known as Fox's mountain meadow snake
- Crocidura foxi, a species of mammal known as Fox's shrew
- Dasymys foxi, a species of rodent known as Fox's shaggy rat
- Fukomys foxi, a species of rodent known as Nigerian mole-rat
- Glenognatha foxi, a species of long-jawed orb weaver
- Melanoplus foxi, a species of spur-throated grasshopper
- Metepeira foxi, a species of orb weaver
- Omosarotes foxi, a species of beetle
- Osmia foxi, a species of mason bees
- Parectypodus foxi, a species that is part of the Parectypodus genus
- Pepsis foxi, a species that is part of the Pepsis genus
- Prionyx foxi, a species of thread-waisted wasp
- Prochetodon foxi, a species that is part of the Prochetodon genus
- Stizoides foxi, a species of sand wasp
- Vullietoliva foxi, a species of sea snail

== Other uses ==
- Buddha-like mindset (pronounced foxi), a term used by Chinese youth to describe people the rejection of the rat race in favour of a tranquil, apathetic life
- FOXI3, a protein

== See also ==
- Fox 1 (disambiguation), including "Fox I"
- Foxie, a 1983 album by Bob James
- Foxy (disambiguation)
- Fox (disambiguation)
