= Omogymna =

Scientific classification
- Kingdom: Animalia
- Phylum: Mollusca
- Class: Gastropoda
- Subclass: Caenogastropoda
- Order: Neogastropoda
- Family: Olividae
- Subfamily: Olivinae
- Genus: Omogymna; Martens, 1897

Genus of gastropod

Omogymna is a genus of sea snails, marine gastropod mollusks in the family Olividae, the olives.

== Taxonomy ==
This genus has become a synonym of Oliva (Omogymna) E. von Martens, 1897 represented as Oliva Bruguière, 1789

== Species ==
The following species were previously accepted in the genus Omogymna:

- Omogymna leonardi (Petuch & Sargent, 1986): synonym of Oliva nitidula Duclos, 1835 synonym of Oliva ozodona Duclos, 1835
- Omogymna nitidula (Duclos, 1835): synonym of Oliva ozodona Duclos, 1835
- Omogymna paxillus (Reeve, 1850):: synonym of Oliva nitidula Duclos, 1835: synonym of Oliva ozodona Duclos, 1835
- Omogymna richerti (Kay, 1979):: synonym of Oliva richerti Kay, 1979 (Omogymna considered as subgenus of Oliva)
- Omogymna sandwicensis (Pease, 1860): synonym of Oliva ozodona sandwicensis Pease, 1860
- Omogymna vullieti Petuch & R. F. Myers, 2014: : synonym of Oliva (Omogymna) vullieti (Petuch & R. F. Myers, 2014) represented as Oliva vullieti (Petuch & R. F. Myers, 2014) (Omogymna considered as subgenus of Oliva)
