= Foxy =

Foxy or Foxxy may refer to:

== People ==
- Foxy, nickname of Jessica Fox (canoeist) (born 1994), French-born Australian Olympic and world champion canoeist
- Foxy Brown (rapper) (born 1978), American rapper
- Foxy Brown (singer), Jamaican reggae singer
- Foxy Flumere (1912–1990), American football, basketball, and baseball coach
- Graeme Fowler (born 1957), English cricketer
- Adam Fox (born 1998), American hockey player
- Neil Fox (broadcaster) (born 1961), British music personality
- John Fox (born 1979), part of British radio duo Foxy and Tom

== Arts and entertainment ==
=== Fictional characters ===
- Foxy (King of Fighters), from the King of Fighters video game series
- Foxy (Merrie Melodies), a Warner Bros. character
- Foxy (One Piece), from Eiichirō Oda's manga One Piece
- Foxxy Cleopatra, a character in the movie Austin Powers in Goldmember
- Foxxy Love, a character in the animated series Drawn Together
- Foxy The Pirate, a character from the Five Nights at Freddy's series
- Foxy Brown, the title character of the 1974 blaxploitation film, Foxy Brown

=== Music ===
- Foxy (band), an American Latin disco group
- Foxy (album), by Sparkle Division (2023)

=== Other uses in arts and entertainment ===
- Foxy (musical), a 1964 Broadway musical
- Foxy (Pillow Pal), a toy made by Ty, Inc.

== Other uses ==
- 5-Methoxy-diisopropyltryptamine, a psychedelic drug
- Foxy (P2P), a peer-to-peer file sharing application for Microsoft Windows
- Foxy, a term used by wine connoisseurs to describe the aroma of grapes from Vitis labrusca

== See also ==
- Foxi (disambiguation)
- Foxie, a 1983 album by Bob James
- "Foxy, Foxy", a 1974 song by Mott the Hoople
- "Foxy Foxy", a 2006 song by Rob Zombie from his album Educated Horses
