= Vullietoliva =

Scientific classification
- Kingdom: Animalia
- Phylum: Mollusca
- Class: Gastropoda
- Subclass: Caenogastropoda
- Order: Neogastropoda
- Superfamily: Olivoidea
- Family: Olividae
- Subfamily: Olivinae
- Genus: Vullietoliva; Petuch & Berschauer, 2017

Type species
- Vullietoliva splendidula G. B. Sowerby I, 1825

Genus of gastropods

Vullietoliva is a genus of sea snails in the family Olividae, the olives.

Vullietoliva was first separated from Oliva from in 2017 by Edward J. Petuch and David P. Berschauer. It was named for Thierry Vulliet, an expert on the Olividae of Australia and Melanesia. It originally contained three species, one of which was later moved into Felicioliva by Petuch and Berschauer.

The shells of Vullietoliva are described as small-to-average sized for Olividae species. They are cylindrical, glossy, and may be colored yellow, bright pink, golden, or pale lavender. They may have two large brown bands.

== Species ==
As of January 2019, there are two accepted species:

- Vullietoliva foxi (Stingley, 1984)
- Vullietoliva splendidula G.B. Sowerby I, 1825

Species brought into synonymy

- Vullietoliva kaleontina (Duclos, 1835): synonym of Felicioliva kaleontina (Duclos, 1835)
