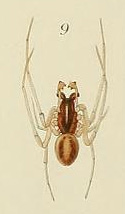
- male from 1906 description

Scientific classification
- Kingdom: Animalia
- Phylum: Arthropoda
- Subphylum: Chelicerata
- Class: Arachnida
- Order: Araneae
- Infraorder: Araneomorphae
- Family: Tetragnathidae
- Genus: Pachygnatha
- Species: P. quadrimaculata

Binomial name
- Pachygnatha quadrimaculata (Bösenberg & Strand, 1906)

Synonyms
- Dyschiriognatha quadrimaculata Bösenberg & Strand, 1906; Glenognatha nipponica Kishida, 1936

= Pachygnatha quadrimaculata =

Species of spider

Pachygnatha quadrimaculata is a species of spider in the family Tetragnathidae. It was originally described as Dyschiriognatha quadrimaculata by Bösenberg and Strand in 1906. The species is distributed across Russia (Far East), China, Korea, and Japan.

== Taxonomy ==
The species was originally described in the genus Dyschiriognatha by Bösenberg and Strand in 1906. Kishida later described Glenognatha nipponica in 1936, which was subsequently synonymized with P. quadrimaculata by Yaginuma in 1983. The species was transferred to the genus Pachygnatha by Zhu, Song and Zhang in 2003.

== Distribution ==
P. quadrimaculata has been recorded from Russia (Far East), China, Korea, and Japan.

== Habitat ==
The species is typically found in marsh lands and between rice plants in rice fields.

== Description ==
Pachygnatha quadrimaculata is a small spider with body lengths ranging from 2.0–3.0 mm.

=== Female ===
Females have a body length of 2.5–3.0 mm. The carapace is longer than wide, lozenge-shaped, and reddish brown in coloration. The head region is stretched to the thoracic region, with the fovea situated much farther from the center. The cervical furrow is dark brown, and the head region and radial furrow have many small, concave speckles. The chelicerae are reddish brown with small, concave speckles and are stout and strong, not protruded forward. The sternum is light yellow with small, concave speckles.

The legs are yellowish brown with spines sparsely distributed, and the segments have long but indistinct annulations. The opisthosoma is slightly longer than wide and slightly bulged oval. The dorsum is yellowish brown with dark brown stripes laterally and two pairs of black spots medianly. The female epigyne is less sclerotized and slightly protruded, with copulatory openings situated downward.

=== Male ===
Males are smaller than females, with a body length of 2.0–2.5 mm. They are similar to females but have a smaller size and darker body coloration. The male pedipalp has a paracymbium separated from the cymbium, and the embolus is spiniform.
