= Hivaoa (disambiguation) =

Hivaoa may refer to

- Hiva Oa, the second largest island in the Marquesas Islands
- Hiva-Oa, the administrative commune which includes the island of Hiva Oa
- Hivaoa, a junior synonym of the spider genus Glenognatha
