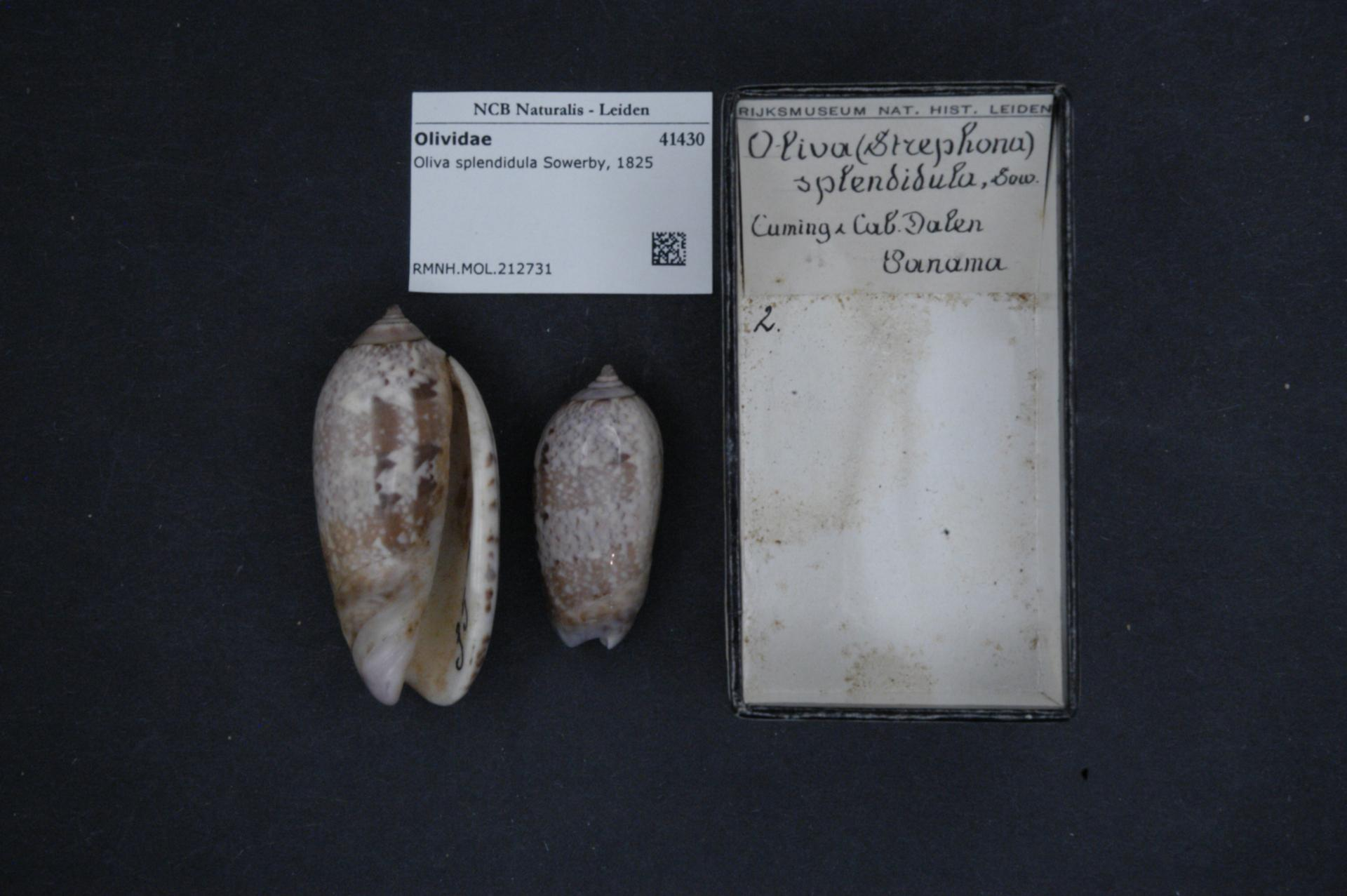

Scientific classification
- Kingdom: Animalia
- Phylum: Mollusca
- Class: Gastropoda
- Subclass: Caenogastropoda
- Order: Neogastropoda
- Family: Olividae
- Genus: Vullietoliva
- Species: V. splendidula

Binomial name
- Vullietoliva splendidula G.B. Sowerby I, 1825

Synonyms
- Oliva splendidula G. B. Sowerby I, 1825

= Vullietoliva splendidula =

Species of gastropod

Vullietoliva splendidula is a species of sea snail, a marine gastropod mollusk in the family Olividae, the olives.
