= Oliva richerti =

Scientific classification
- Kingdom: Animalia
- Phylum: Mollusca
- Class: Gastropoda
- Subclass: Caenogastropoda
- Order: Neogastropoda
- Family: Olividae
- Subfamily: Olivinae
- Genus: Oliva
- Species: O. richerti

Binomial name
- Oliva richerti Kay, 1979

Synonyms
- Omogymna richerti (Kay, 1979)

Species of gastropod

Oliva richerti is a species of sea snail, a marine gastropod mollusk in the family Olividae, the olives.

It was first described by E. A. Kay in 1979 as Oliva richerti.

== Distribution ==
This marine species occurs in the Pacific Ocean off Hawaii.
