= Pachygnatha leleupi =

Leleup's Orb-web Spider

Scientific classification
- Kingdom: Animalia
- Phylum: Arthropoda
- Subphylum: Chelicerata
- Class: Arachnida
- Order: Araneae
- Infraorder: Araneomorphae
- Family: Tetragnathidae
- Genus: Pachygnatha
- Species: P. leleupi

Binomial name
- Pachygnatha leleupi Lawrence, 1952

Species of spider

Pachygnatha leleupi is a species of spider in the family Tetragnathidae. It is found in several African countries and is commonly known as Leleup's orb-web spider.

== Distribution ==
Pachygnatha leleupi occurs across Cameroon, Democratic Republic of the Congo, Malawi, Zimbabwe, and South Africa. In South Africa, the species is known from Limpopo Province, including Hanglip Forest and Thathe Vondo Forest.

== Habitat and ecology ==
The species inhabits damp places in low vegetation where it constructs flimsy webs. In South Africa, it has been sampled from the Savanna Biome at altitudes ranging from 969 to 1346 m.

== Conservation ==
Pachygnatha leleupi is listed as Least Concern by the South African National Biodiversity Institute due to its wide geographical range across multiple African countries. There are no significant threats to the species.
