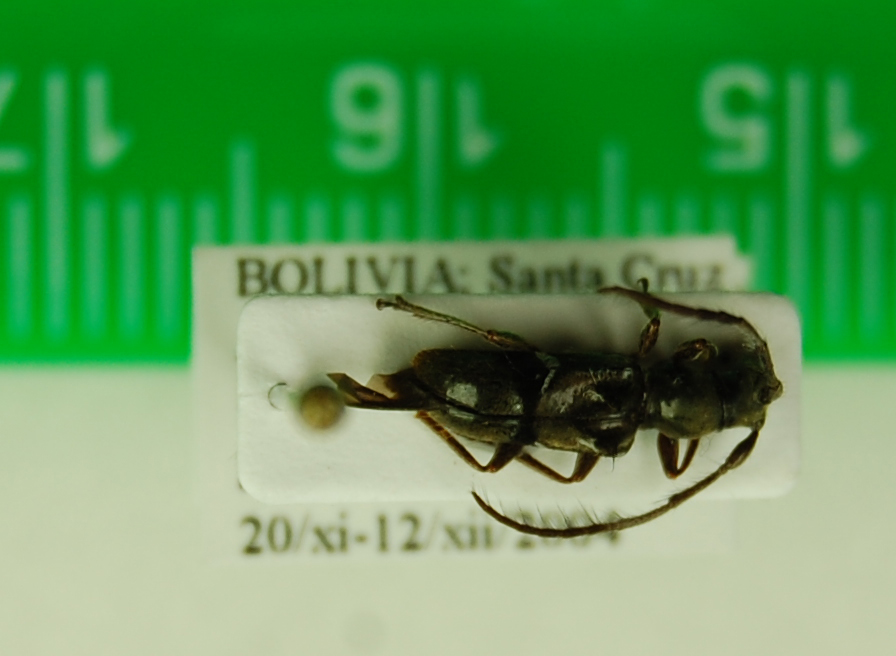
- Omosarotes singularis

Scientific classification
- Kingdom: Animalia
- Phylum: Arthropoda
- Clade: Pancrustacea
- Class: Insecta
- Order: Coleoptera
- Suborder: Polyphaga
- Infraorder: Cucujiformia
- Family: Cerambycidae
- Tribe: Cyrtinini
- Genus: Omosarotes; Pascoe, 1860

= Omosarotes =

Genus of beetles

Omosarotes is a genus of longhorn beetles of the subfamily Lamiinae. They occur in the northern half of South America and in Central America north to Nicaragua.

== Species ==
There are five recognized species:

- Omosarotes ater Julio & Monné, 2001
- Omosarotes foxi (Lane, 1973)
- Omosarotes nigripennis (Zajciw, 1970)
- Omosarotes paradoxum (Tippmann, 1955)
- Omosarotes singularis Pascoe, 1860
