= Recourtoliva =

Scientific classification
- Kingdom: Animalia
- Phylum: Mollusca
- Class: Gastropoda
- Subclass: Caenogastropoda
- Order: Neogastropoda
- Family: Olividae
- Subfamily: Olivinae
- Genus: Recourtoliva; Petuch & Berschauer, 2017
- Species: R. poppei

Binomial name
- Recourtoliva poppei (Sargent & Petuch, 2008)

Synonyms
- Oliva aliguayensis Poppe, 2005; Oliva poppei Sargent & Petuch, 2008

Genus of gastropods

Recourtoliva poppei is a species of sea snail, a marine gastropod mollusc in the family Olividae, the olives.

== Description ==
Shell size 44 mm.

== Distribution ==
Pacific Ocean:Philippines.
