= Oliva polpasta radix =

Scientific classification
- Kingdom: Animalia
- Phylum: Mollusca
- Class: Gastropoda
- Subclass: Caenogastropoda
- Order: Neogastropoda
- Family: Olividae
- Genus: Oliva
- Species: O. polpasta
- Subspecies: O. p. radix

Trinomial name
- Oliva polpasta radix Petuch & Sargent, 1986

Synonyms
- Americoliva polpasta radix (Petuch & Sargent, 1986); Oliva radix Petuch & Sargent, 1986

Species of gastropod

Oliva polpasta radix is a subspecies of the sea snail species Oliva polpasta, a marine gastropod mollusc in the family Olividae, the olives.
