= Pachygnatha sundevalli =

Scientific classification
- Kingdom: Animalia
- Phylum: Arthropoda
- Subphylum: Chelicerata
- Class: Arachnida
- Order: Araneae
- Infraorder: Araneomorphae
- Family: Tetragnathidae
- Genus: Pachygnatha
- Species: P. sundevalli

Binomial name
- Pachygnatha sundevalli Senglet, 1973

Species of spider

Pachygnatha sundevalli is a spider species in the family Tetragnathidae, found in Portugal and Spain.
