= Omosarotes nigripennis =

Scientific classification
- Kingdom: Animalia
- Phylum: Arthropoda
- Clade: Pancrustacea
- Class: Insecta
- Order: Coleoptera
- Suborder: Polyphaga
- Infraorder: Cucujiformia
- Family: Cerambycidae
- Genus: Omosarotes
- Species: O. nigripennis

Binomial name
- Omosarotes nigripennis (Zajciw, 1970)

Synonyms
- Scopadus nigripennis Zajciw, 1970; Cyrtinacantha nigripennis Zajciw, 1970

Species of beetle

Omosarotes nigripennis is a species of beetle in the family Cerambycidae. It was described by Dmytro Zajciw in 1970. It is known from Espírito Santo, Brazil.

Omosarotes nigripennis measure 6–6.8 mm (0.24–0.27 in).
