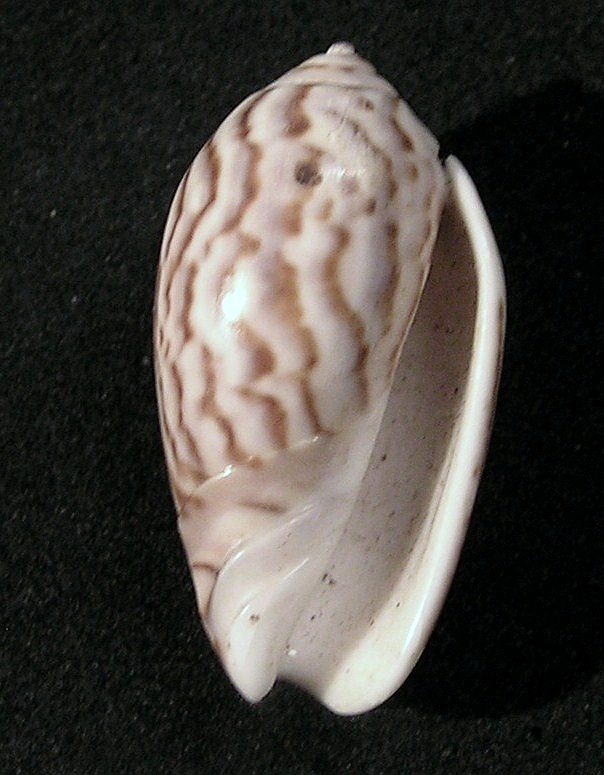
- Apertural view of a shell of Oliva peruviana fulgurata

Scientific classification
- Kingdom: Animalia
- Phylum: Mollusca
- Class: Gastropoda
- Subclass: Caenogastropoda
- Order: Neogastropoda
- Family: Olividae
- Genus: Felicioliva
- Species: F. peruviana

Binomial name
- Felicioliva peruviana (Lamarck, 1811)

Synonyms
- Oliva peruviana Lamarck, 1811; Oliva senegalensis Lamarck, J.B.P.A. de, 1811; Oliva (Strephona) peruviana Lamarck, 1811

= Felicioliva peruviana =

Species of gastropod

Felicioliva peruviana, common name the Peruvian olive, is a species of sea snail, a marine gastropod mollusc in the family Olividae, the olives. The length of the shell varies between 27 and 55 mm (1.1 and 2.2 in). This species occurs in the Pacific Ocean from Peru to Southern Chile (not in the Galapagos Islands)
