= Pachygnatha zappa =

Zappa Orb-web Spider

Scientific classification
- Kingdom: Animalia
- Phylum: Arthropoda
- Subphylum: Chelicerata
- Class: Arachnida
- Order: Araneae
- Infraorder: Araneomorphae
- Family: Tetragnathidae
- Genus: Pachygnatha
- Species: P. zappa

Binomial name
- Pachygnatha zappa Bosmans & Bosselaers, 1994

Species of spider

Pachygnatha zappa is a spider named after musician Frank Zappa because of its unique markings which resemble his famous moustache.

Belgian biologists Robert Bosmans and Jan Bosselaers, from the Rijksuniversiteit Gent organized two expeditions to Mount Cameroon and neighbouring ranges. In 1994 (in Zoologica Scripta, Vol. 23, No. 4, pages 325–352) they introduced the species they named Pachygnatha zappa.

== Distribution ==
Pachygnatha zappa is known from Cameroon, Kenya, Malawi, and South Africa.

In South Africa, the species occurs in KwaZulu-Natal and Limpopo Province, including locations such as Kamberg Nature Reserve, Kloof, Baynesfield, Polokwane area, Woodbush Forest, and Swartbos Forest.

== Habitat and ecology ==
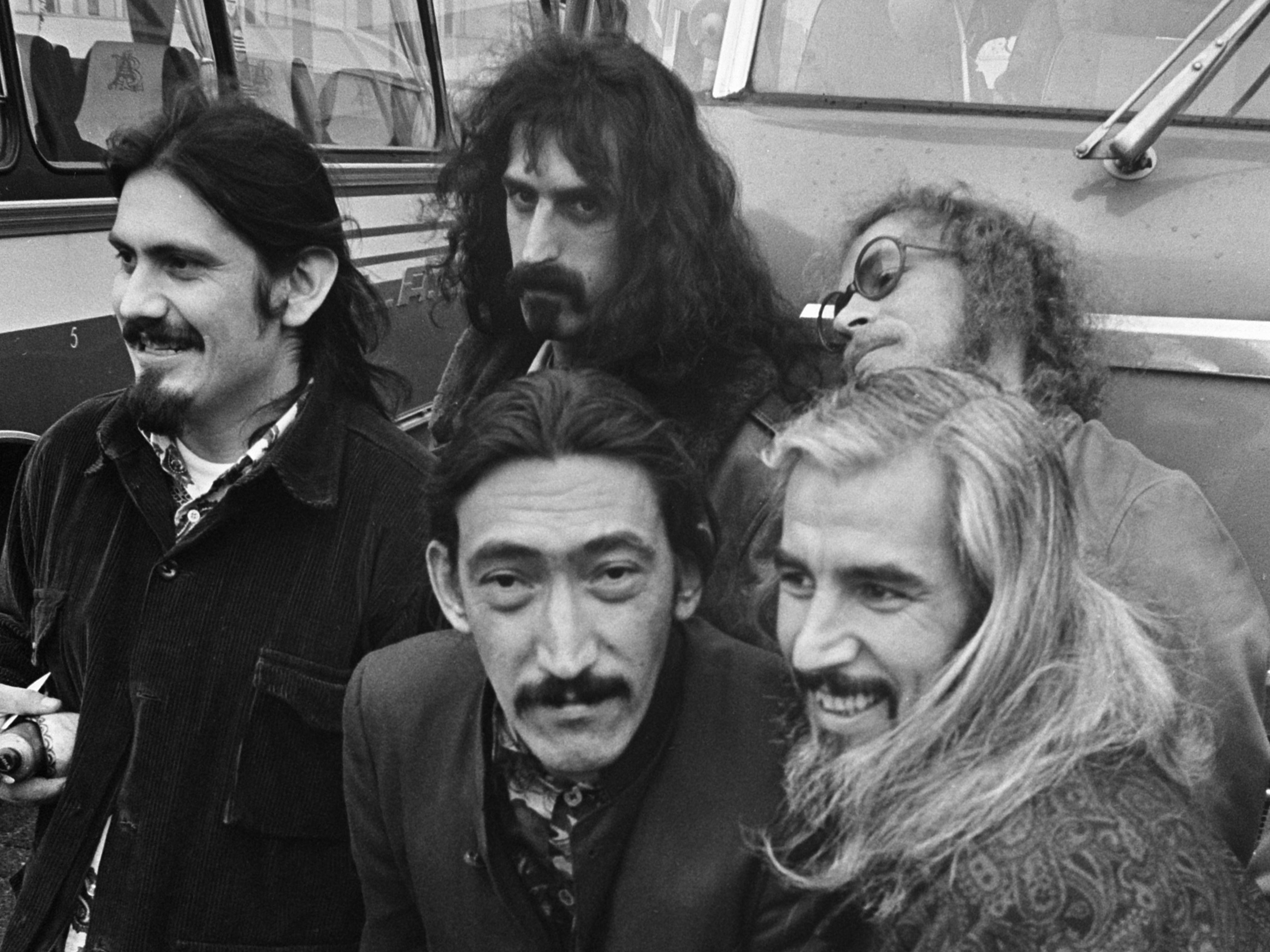
Zappa (back) with the Mothers, 1968

The species has been sampled using sweep nets in the Forest and Savanna biomes at altitudes ranging from 496 to 1732 m. Little is known about their behaviour.

== Conservation ==
Pachygnatha zappa is listed as Least Concern due to its wide geographical range across four African countries. The species is protected in Kamberg Nature Reserve. There are no significant threats to the species.

== See also ==
- List of organisms named after famous people (born 1925–1949)
