= Pachygnatha terilis =

Scientific classification
- Kingdom: Animalia
- Phylum: Arthropoda
- Subphylum: Chelicerata
- Class: Arachnida
- Order: Araneae
- Infraorder: Araneomorphae
- Family: Tetragnathidae
- Genus: Pachygnatha
- Species: P. terilis

Binomial name
- Pachygnatha terilis Thaler, 1991

Species of spider

Pachygnatha terilis is a spider species found in Switzerland, Austria and Italy.
