= Omosarotes paradoxum =

Scientific classification
- Kingdom: Animalia
- Phylum: Arthropoda
- Clade: Pancrustacea
- Class: Insecta
- Order: Coleoptera
- Suborder: Polyphaga
- Infraorder: Cucujiformia
- Family: Cerambycidae
- Genus: Omosarotes
- Species: O. paradoxum

Binomial name
- Omosarotes paradoxum (Tippmann, 1955)

Synonyms
- Acanthomerosternoplon paradoxum Tippmann, 1955; Omosarotes paradoxus (Tippmann, 1955); Cyrtinacantha mirabilis Zajciw, 1970

Species of beetle

Omosarotes paradoxum or Omosarotes paradoxus is a species of beetle in the family Cerambycidae. It is known from Costa Rica, Panama, Ecuador, Peru, and Brazil.

Omosarotes paradoxum measure 5.5–8.3 mm (0.22–0.33 in).
