= Pachygnatha brevis =

Scientific classification
- Domain: Eukaryota
- Kingdom: Animalia
- Phylum: Arthropoda
- Subphylum: Chelicerata
- Class: Arachnida
- Order: Araneae
- Infraorder: Araneomorphae
- Family: Tetragnathidae
- Genus: Pachygnatha
- Species: P. brevis

Binomial name
- Pachygnatha brevis Keyserling, 1884

Species of spider

Pachygnatha brevis is a species of long-jawed orb weaver in the spider family Tetragnathidae. It is found in the United States and Canada.
