= Fox 1 =

Fox 1 may refer to:

== Military ==
- Semi-active radar homing missile, also referred as the "fox one" missile type
- FOX-1, Rowley Island, Qikiqtaaluk Region, Nunavut, Canada; a DEW-Line radar station
- Fairey Fox I, a British interwar biplane bomber
- Fox one, a brevity code used by NATO pilots; see Fox (code word)

== Arts, entertainment, media ==
- Fox One, a card game from One Small Step for air wargaming
- Fox One – Armageddon, a 1997 comic by Olivier Ayache-Vidal

=== Television ===
- Fox 1 (South America), a premium subscription TV channel from Star Premium
- Fox One (USA), a streaming TV service from Fox Corporation
- Foxtel One (Australia), formerly known as Fox One, an Australian subscription TV channel
- Fox +1 (Ireland), a pay TV channel that was part of Fox (British and Irish TV channel)

== Other uses ==
- Foxboro FOX1, a distributed control system
- RBFOX1, also known as FOX1, a gene encoding for RNA binding protein fox-1 homolog
- Fox I script, a written script for the Fox language

== See also ==
- Fox Sports 1, a TV channel
- Foxi (disambiguation)
- Fox (disambiguation)
