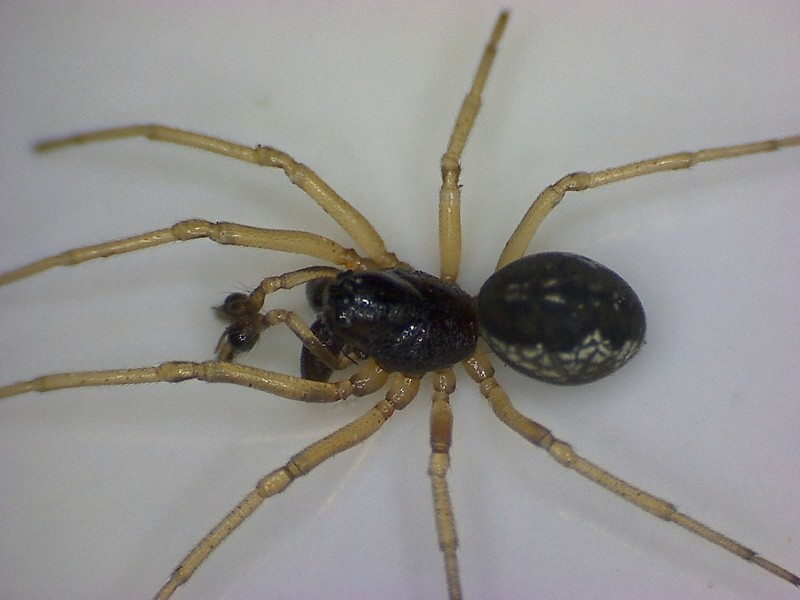

Scientific classification
- Kingdom: Animalia
- Phylum: Arthropoda
- Subphylum: Chelicerata
- Class: Arachnida
- Order: Araneae
- Infraorder: Araneomorphae
- Family: Tetragnathidae
- Genus: Pachygnatha
- Species: P. degeeri

Binomial name
- Pachygnatha degeeri (Sundevall, 1830)

= Pachygnatha degeeri =

Species of spider

Pachygnatha degeeri is a spider in the family of long-jawed orb weavers (Tetragnathidae).

== Location ==
Pachygnatha degeeri is found in Europe.

== Appearance ==
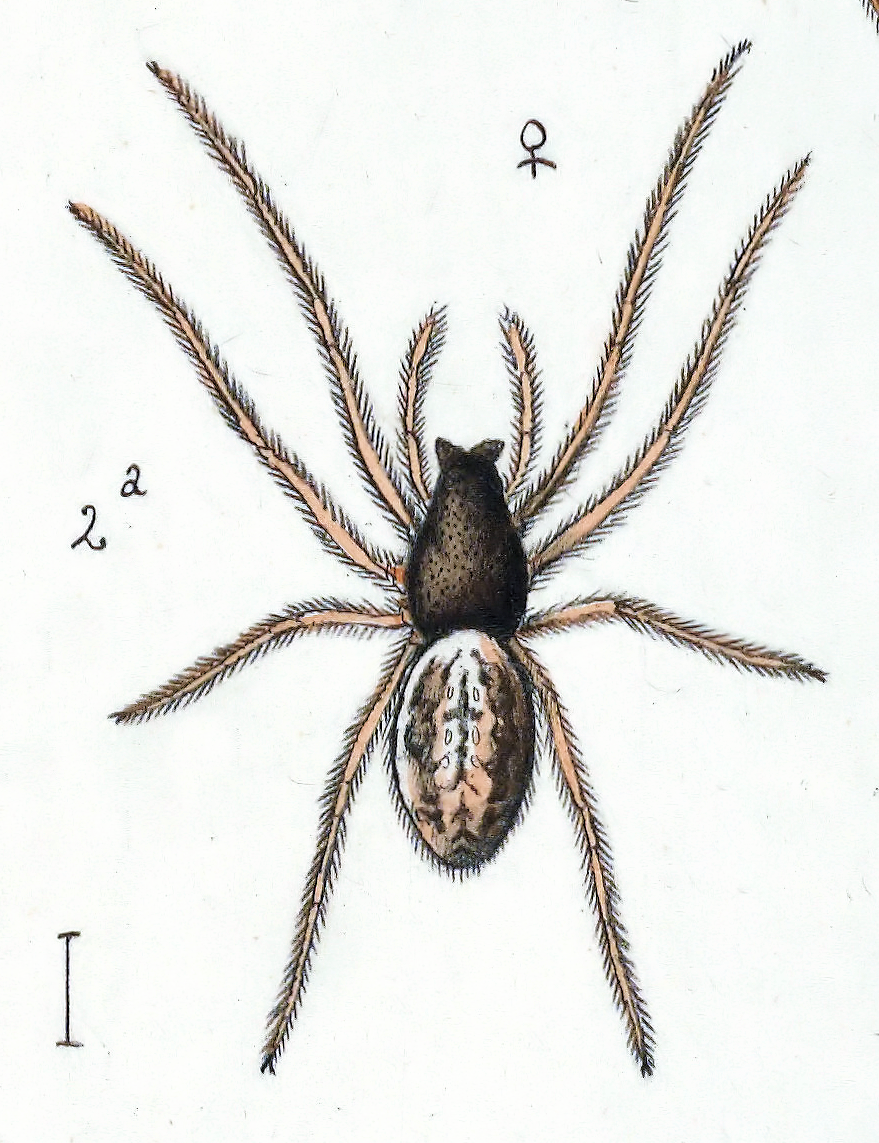
female

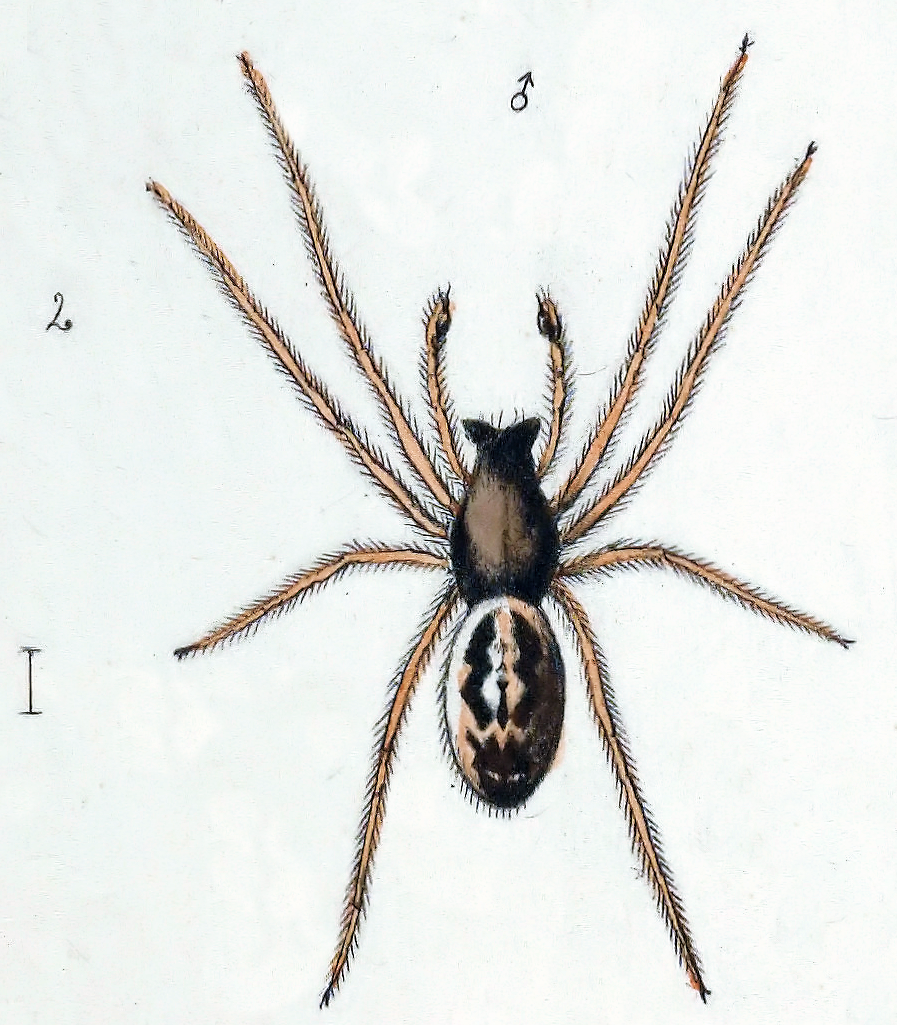
male

Pachygnatha has a dark body, without a dark middle band. The legs are light, yellow-orange. The back can vary in colour and pattern. The back is split in two into an abdomen and a front body (prosoma or cephalothorax). In front of the head are eight eyes. An adult female (imago) is around 4.5 mm (0.18 in), while a male is 4 mm (0.16 in) long (body length).

There are two other species, P. listeri and P. clercki in the family Pachygnatha. These can be separated from this species by the dark head. There is also a darker line on the body.

== Life ==
Pachygnatha degeeri can be found in woods, among plants and grant. Adults can be seen from the middle of the summer until the first frosts in winter.

== Literature ==
- W. Nentwig, A. Hänggi, C. Kropf & T. Blick (Hrsg.): Spinnen Mitteleuropas – Bestimmungsschlüssel, slekten (gattung) Pachygnatha (tysk)
