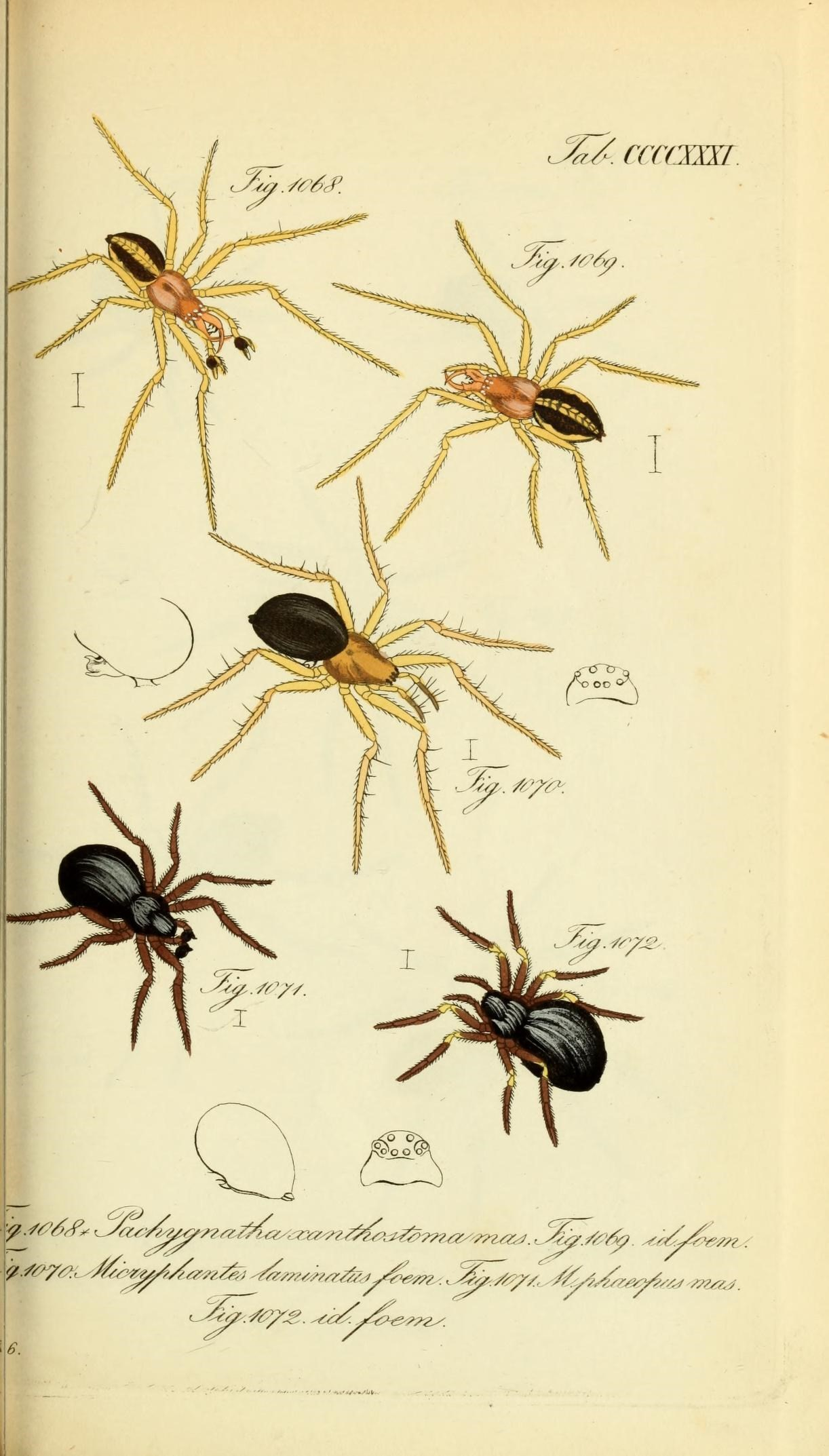

Scientific classification
- Domain: Eukaryota
- Kingdom: Animalia
- Phylum: Arthropoda
- Subphylum: Chelicerata
- Class: Arachnida
- Order: Araneae
- Infraorder: Araneomorphae
- Family: Tetragnathidae
- Genus: Pachygnatha
- Species: P. xanthostoma

Binomial name
- Pachygnatha xanthostoma C. L. Koch, 1845

= Pachygnatha xanthostoma =

Species of spider

Pachygnatha xanthostoma is a species of long-jawed orb weaver in the spider family Tetragnathidae. It is found in the United States and Canada.
