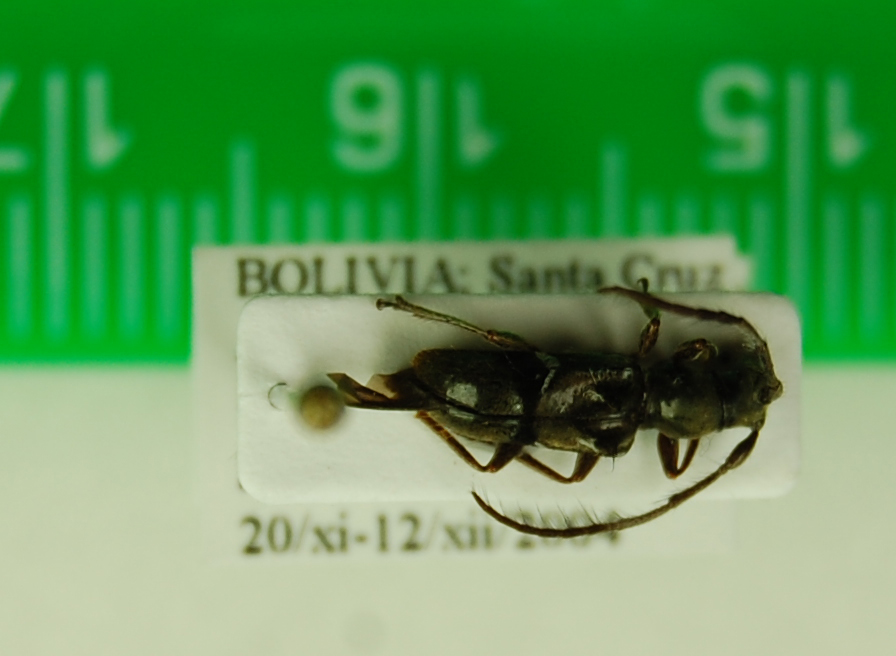

Scientific classification
- Kingdom: Animalia
- Phylum: Arthropoda
- Clade: Pancrustacea
- Class: Insecta
- Order: Coleoptera
- Suborder: Polyphaga
- Infraorder: Cucujiformia
- Family: Cerambycidae
- Genus: Omosarotes
- Species: O. singularis

Binomial name
- Omosarotes singularis Pascoe, 1860

= Omosarotes singularis =

Species of beetle

Omosarotes singularis is a species of longhorn beetles of the subfamily Lamiinae. It is known from Central America (Nicaragua, Costa Rica, Panama) and northern South America (Brazil, Colombia).

Omosarotes singularis measure 9.5–10.5 mm (0.37–0.41 in).
