= Pachygnatha simoni =

Scientific classification
- Kingdom: Animalia
- Phylum: Arthropoda
- Subphylum: Chelicerata
- Class: Arachnida
- Order: Araneae
- Infraorder: Araneomorphae
- Family: Tetragnathidae
- Genus: Pachygnatha
- Species: P. simoni

Binomial name
- Pachygnatha simoni Senglet, 1973

Species of spider

Pachygnatha simoni is a spider species found in Spain.
