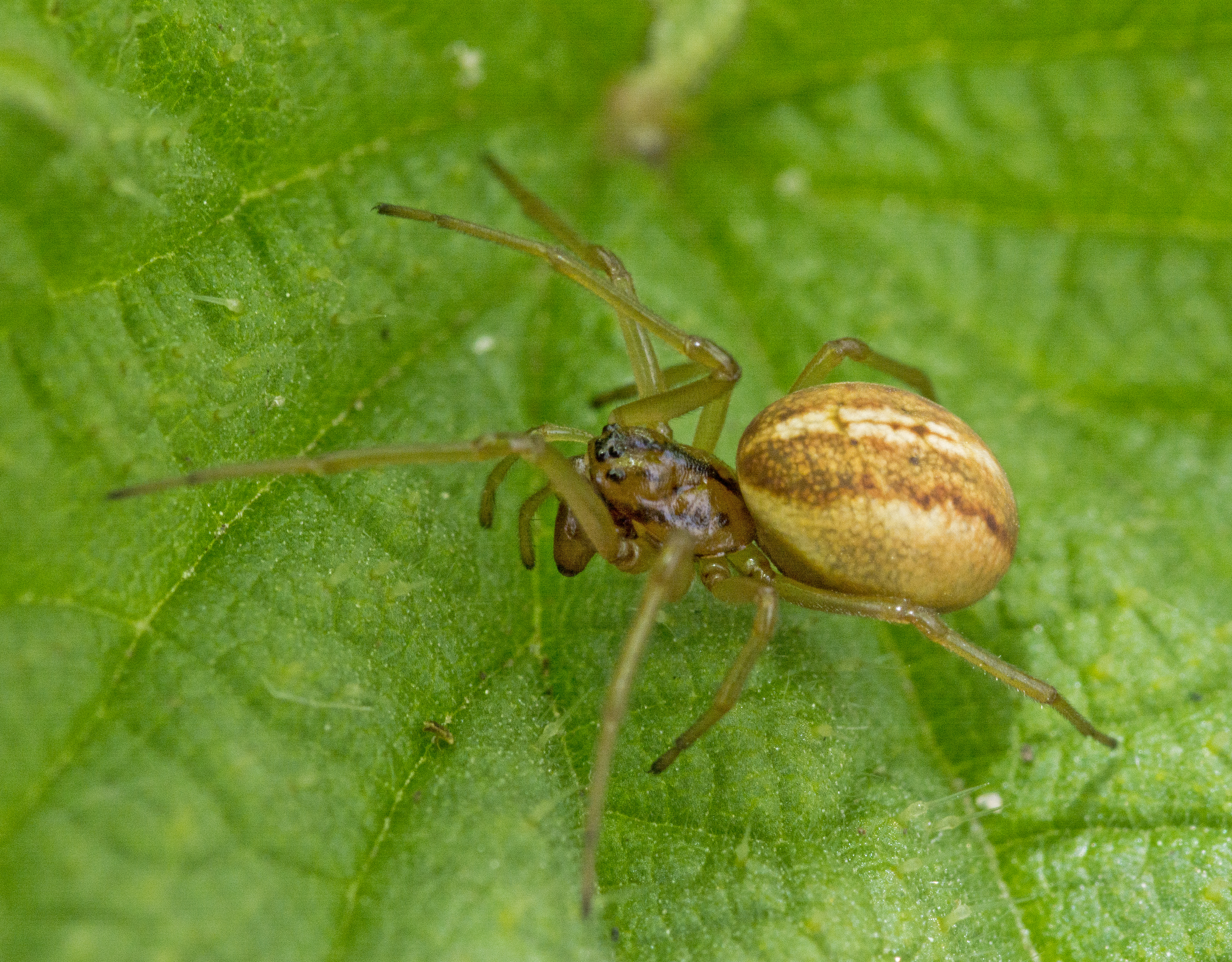

Scientific classification
- Domain: Eukaryota
- Kingdom: Animalia
- Phylum: Arthropoda
- Subphylum: Chelicerata
- Class: Arachnida
- Order: Araneae
- Infraorder: Araneomorphae
- Family: Tetragnathidae
- Genus: Pachygnatha
- Species: P. clercki

Binomial name
- Pachygnatha clercki Sundevall, 1823

= Pachygnatha clercki =

Species of spider

Pachygnatha clercki is a species of long-jawed orb weaver in the family of spiders known as Tetragnathidae. It is found in North America, Europe, Caucasus, Russia, Central Asia, China, Korea, and Japan.

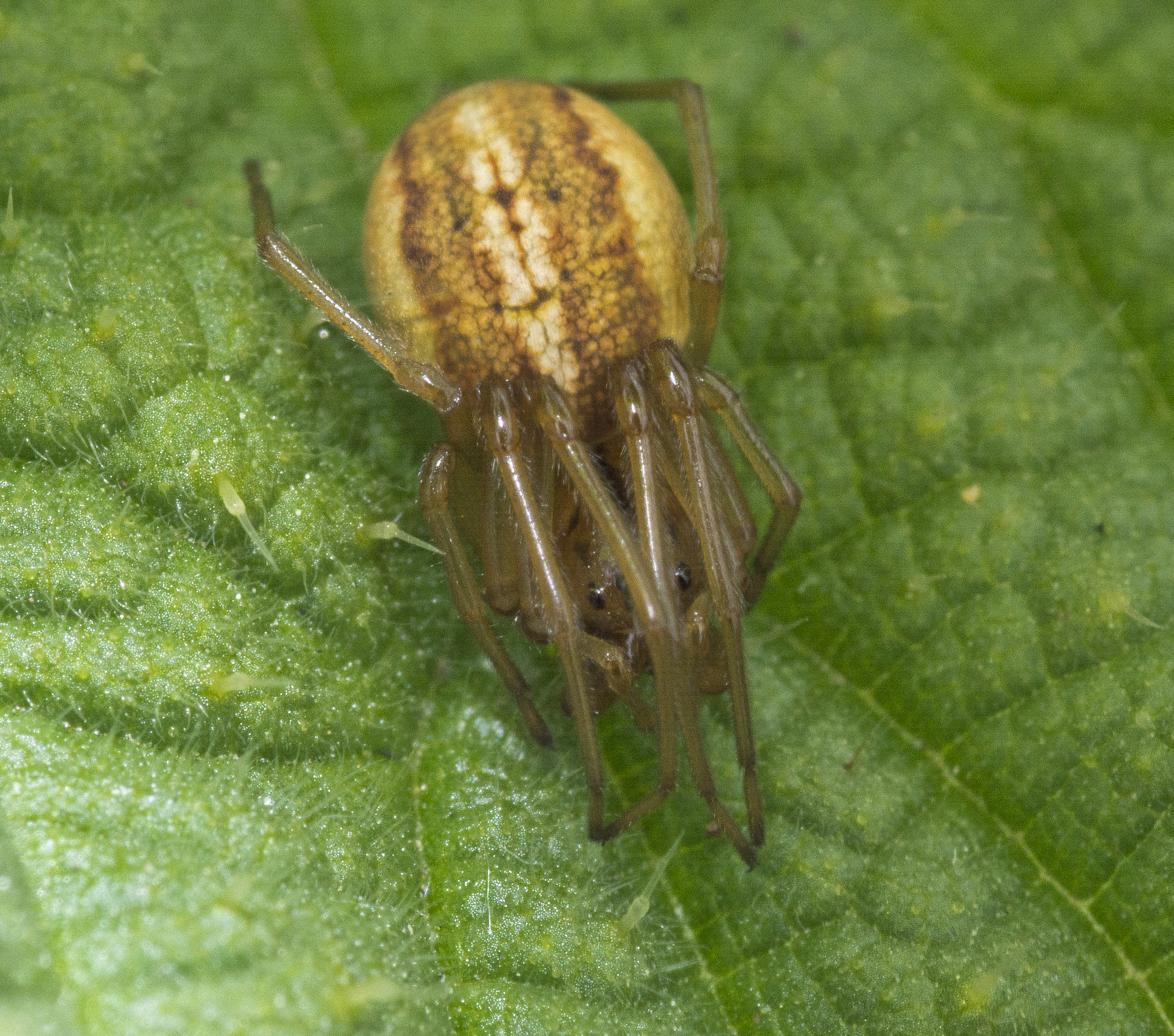
