= Americoliva carolinensis =

Americoliva carolinensis Temporal range: Pliocene-Pleistocene

Scientific classification
- Kingdom: Animalia
- Phylum: Mollusca
- Class: Gastropoda
- Subclass: Caenogastropoda
- Order: Neogastropoda
- Family: Olividae
- Genus: Americoliva
- Species: †A. carolinensis

Binomial name
- †Americoliva carolinensis (Conrad, 1862)

Extinct species of gastropod

Americoliva carolinensis is an extinct species of gastropod in the family Olividae.
