= Omosarotes ater =

Scientific classification
- Kingdom: Animalia
- Phylum: Arthropoda
- Clade: Pancrustacea
- Class: Insecta
- Order: Coleoptera
- Suborder: Polyphaga
- Infraorder: Cucujiformia
- Family: Cerambycidae
- Genus: Omosarotes
- Species: O. ater

Binomial name
- Omosarotes ater Julio & Monné, 2001

Species of beetle

Omosarotes ater is a species of beetle in the family Cerambycidae. It is known from western Ecuador.

Omosarotes ater measure 8.4 mm (0.33 in).
