= Pachygnatha clerckoides =

Scientific classification
- Kingdom: Animalia
- Phylum: Arthropoda
- Subphylum: Chelicerata
- Class: Arachnida
- Order: Araneae
- Infraorder: Araneomorphae
- Family: Tetragnathidae
- Genus: Pachygnatha
- Species: P. clerckoides

Binomial name
- Pachygnatha clerckoides Wunderlich, 1985

Species of spider

Pachygnatha clerckoides is a spider species found in Albania, North Macedonia, Bulgaria, Russia, and Iran.
