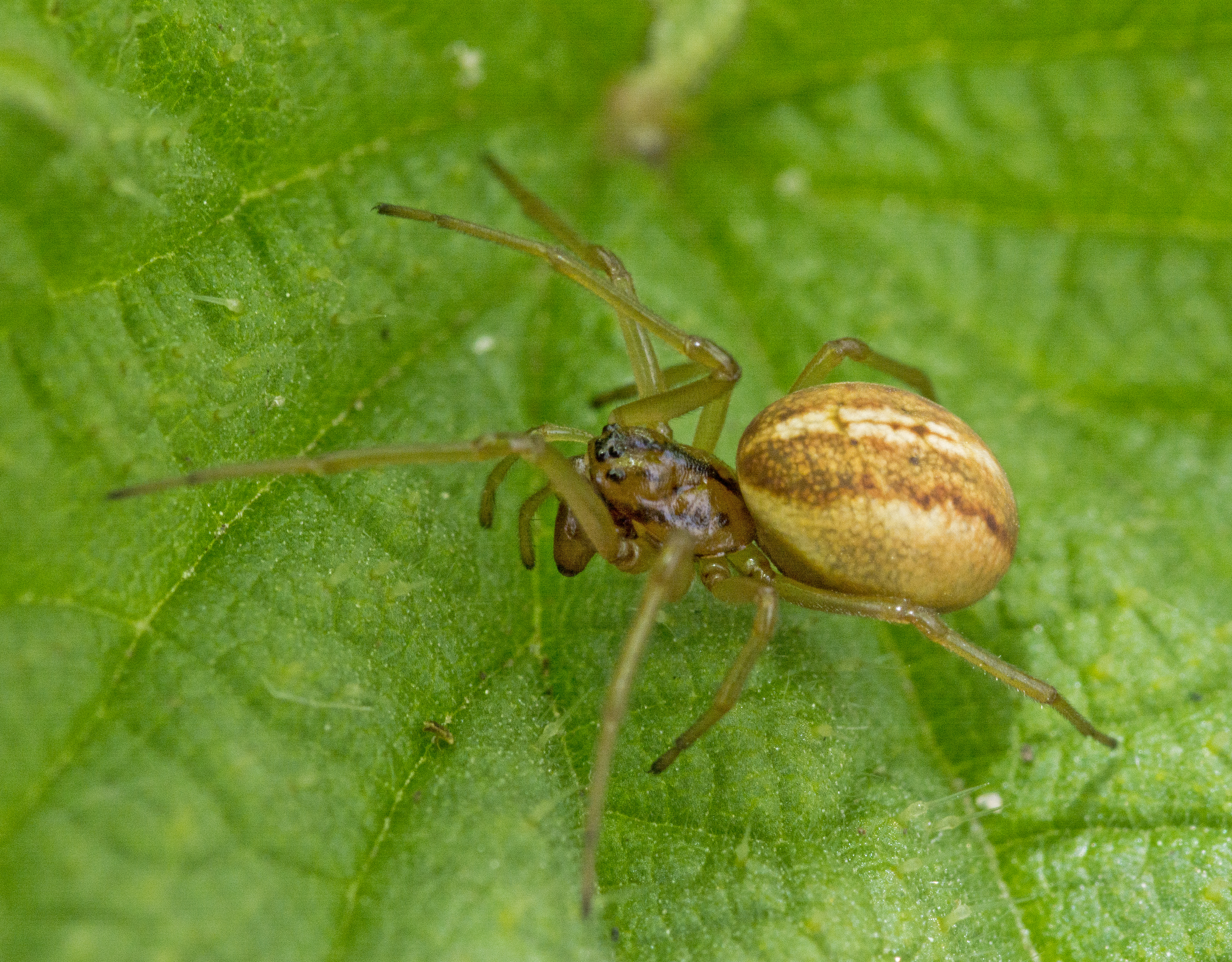
- Pachygnatha clercki
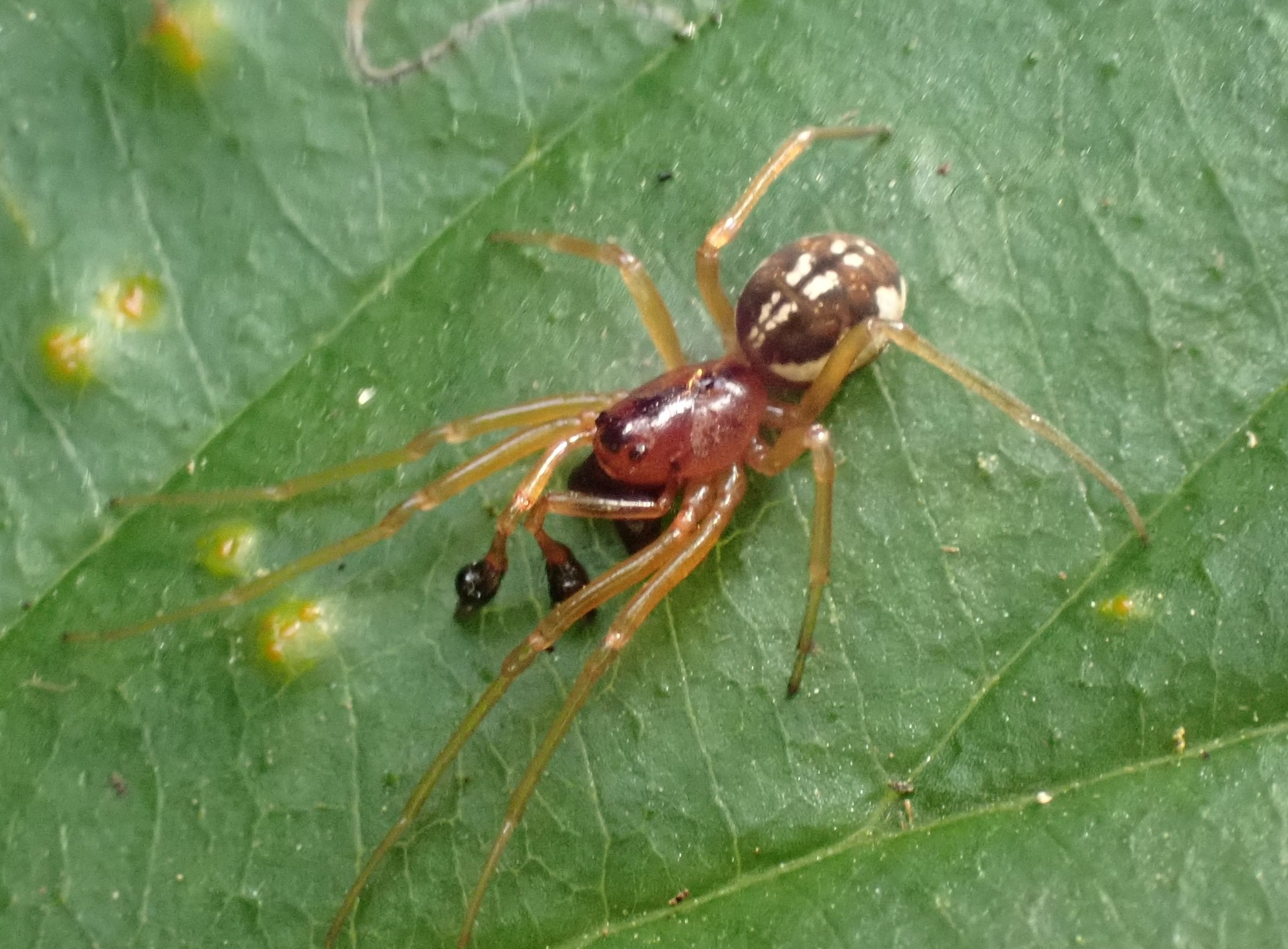
- male P. listeri

Scientific classification
- Kingdom: Animalia
- Phylum: Arthropoda
- Subphylum: Chelicerata
- Class: Arachnida
- Order: Araneae
- Infraorder: Araneomorphae
- Family: Tetragnathidae
- Genus: Pachygnatha; Sundevall, 1823

Type species
- P. clercki Sundevall, 1823

Species
- 44, see text

= Pachygnatha =

Genus of spiders

Pachygnatha is a genus of long-jawed orb-weavers that was first described by Carl Jakob Sundevall in 1823.

== Distribution ==
Spiders in this genus are found in Eurasia, Africa and North America.

== Life style ==
Pachygnatha species are typically found close to the ground in leaf litter, hollow plant stems, under stones, dead wood, or leaves. They are usually more numerous in damp areas.

Adult spiders are secondarily webless, with only immature spiders constructing orb webs.

=== African species ===
Very little is known about the biology and behaviour of Afrotropical species. Studies have shown that Pachygnatha species are found mainly in the lower litter layer, with Pachygnatha leleupi being the most common species. This species occurs throughout equatorial Africa at high altitudes, from Cameroon to Malawi. Specimens were much more abundant where water was available.

== Description ==
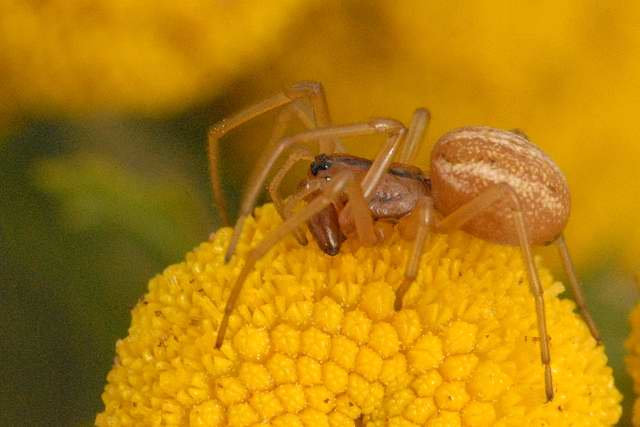
P. clercki

The carapace bears eyes that are closely grouped, with median eyes separated by their own diameter. The chelicerae are notably large and consistently feature three teeth on the anterior margin in females. In males, the chelicerae are modified and expanded, sometimes bearing a spur on the outside above the base of the fang. The abdomen is subspherical and slightly flattened.

The dorsal surface displays a folium bordered by dark marks with adjacent silver spots. The folium typically has posterior lobes, and the cardiac mark is sometimes outlined by dark pigment or features a median dark mark. Paired white spots are often present. The legs are rather thin and lack macrosetae.

== Species ==
As of October 2025, this genus includes 44 species and two subspecies:

- Pachygnatha amurensis Strand, 1907 – Russia (Far East), China
- Pachygnatha atromarginata Bosmans & Bosselaers, 1994 – Cameroon
- Pachygnatha autumnalis Marx, 1884 – Canada, United States, Cuba
- Pachygnatha bispiralis Nzigidahera & Jocqué, 2014 – Burundi
- Pachygnatha bonneti Senglet, 1973 – Spain
- Pachygnatha brevis Keyserling, 1884 – Canada, United States
- Pachygnatha calusa Levi, 1980 – United States
- Pachygnatha clercki Sundevall, 1823 – North America, Europe, Caucasus, Russia (Europe to Far East), Kazakhstan, Iran, Central Asia, China, Korea, Japan (type species)
- Pachygnatha clerckoides Wunderlich, 1985 – Albania, North Macedonia, Bulgaria, Russia (Europe, Caucasus), Iran
- Pachygnatha degeeri Sundevall, 1830 – Azores, Europe, Turkey, Caucasus, Russia (Europe to Far East), Iran, Central Asia, China
  - P. d. dysdericolor Jocqué, 1977 – Morocco
- Pachygnatha dorothea McCook, 1894 – Canada, United States
- Pachygnatha fengzhen Zhu, Song & Zhang, 2003 – China
- Pachygnatha furcillata Keyserling, 1884 – Canada, United States
- Pachygnatha goedeli Bosmans & Bosselaers, 1994 – Cameroon
- Pachygnatha hexatracheata Bosmans & Bosselaers, 1994 – Cameroon
- Pachygnatha intermedia Nzigidahera & Jocqué, 2014 – Burundi
- Pachygnatha jansseni Bosmans & Bosselaers, 1994 – Cameroon
- Pachygnatha kiwuana Strand, 1913 – DR Congo
- Pachygnatha leleupi Lawrence, 1952 – Cameroon, DR Congo, Malawi, Zimbabwe, South Africa
- Pachygnatha listeri Sundevall, 1830 – Europe, Turkey, Caucasus, Russia (Europe to Far East), Kazakhstan
- Pachygnatha longipes Simon, 1894 – Madagascar
- Pachygnatha monticola Baba & Tanikawa, 2018 – Japan
- Pachygnatha mucronata Tullgren, 1910 – East Africa
  - P. m. comorana Schmidt & Krause, 1993 – Comoros
- Pachygnatha ochongipina Barrion & Litsinger, 1995 – Philippines
- Pachygnatha okuensis Bosmans & Bosselaers, 1994 – Cameroon
- Pachygnatha opdeweerdtae Bosmans & Bosselaers, 1994 – Cameroon
- Pachygnatha palmquisti Tullgren, 1910 – Kenya, Tanzania
- Pachygnatha procincta Bosmans & Bosselaers, 1994 – Cameroon, Burundi, Kenya
- Pachygnatha quadrimaculata (Bösenberg & Strand, 1906) – Russia (Far East), China, Korea, Japan
- Pachygnatha rotunda Saito, 1939 – Japan
- Pachygnatha ruanda Strand, 1913 – Rwanda
- Pachygnatha shengtangensis Huang, Wu, Yin, Xu & Chen, 2024 – China
- Pachygnatha simoni Senglet, 1973 – Spain
- Pachygnatha sundevalli Senglet, 1973 – Portugal, Spain
- Pachygnatha tenera Karsch, 1879 – Russia (Far East), China, Korea, Japan
- Pachygnatha terilis Thaler, 1991 – Switzerland, Austria, Italy
- Pachygnatha tristriata C. L. Koch, 1845 – Canada, United States
- Pachygnatha tullgreni Senglet, 1973 – Portugal, Spain
- Pachygnatha unciniformis Huang, Wu, Yin, Xu & Chen, 2024 – China
- Pachygnatha ventricosa Nzigidahera & Jocqué, 2014 – Burundi
- Pachygnatha vorax Thorell, 1895 – Myanmar
- Pachygnatha xanthostoma C. L. Koch, 1845 – Canada, United States
- Pachygnatha zappa Bosmans & Bosselaers, 1994 – Cameroon, Kenya, Malawi, South Africa
- Pachygnatha zhui Zhu, Song & Zhang, 2003 – China

In synonymy:

- P. gaoi Zhu, Song & Zhang, 2003 = Pachygnatha amurensis Strand, 1907
- P. kuratai Levi, 1951 = Pachygnatha dorothea McCook, 1894
- P. nipponica (Kishida, 1936) = Pachygnatha quadrimaculata (Bösenberg & Strand, 1906)
- P. sewardi Chamberlin & Ivie, 1947 = Pachygnatha clercki Sundevall, 1823
- P. yiliensis (Hu & Wu, 1985) = Pachygnatha degeeri Sundevall, 1830
