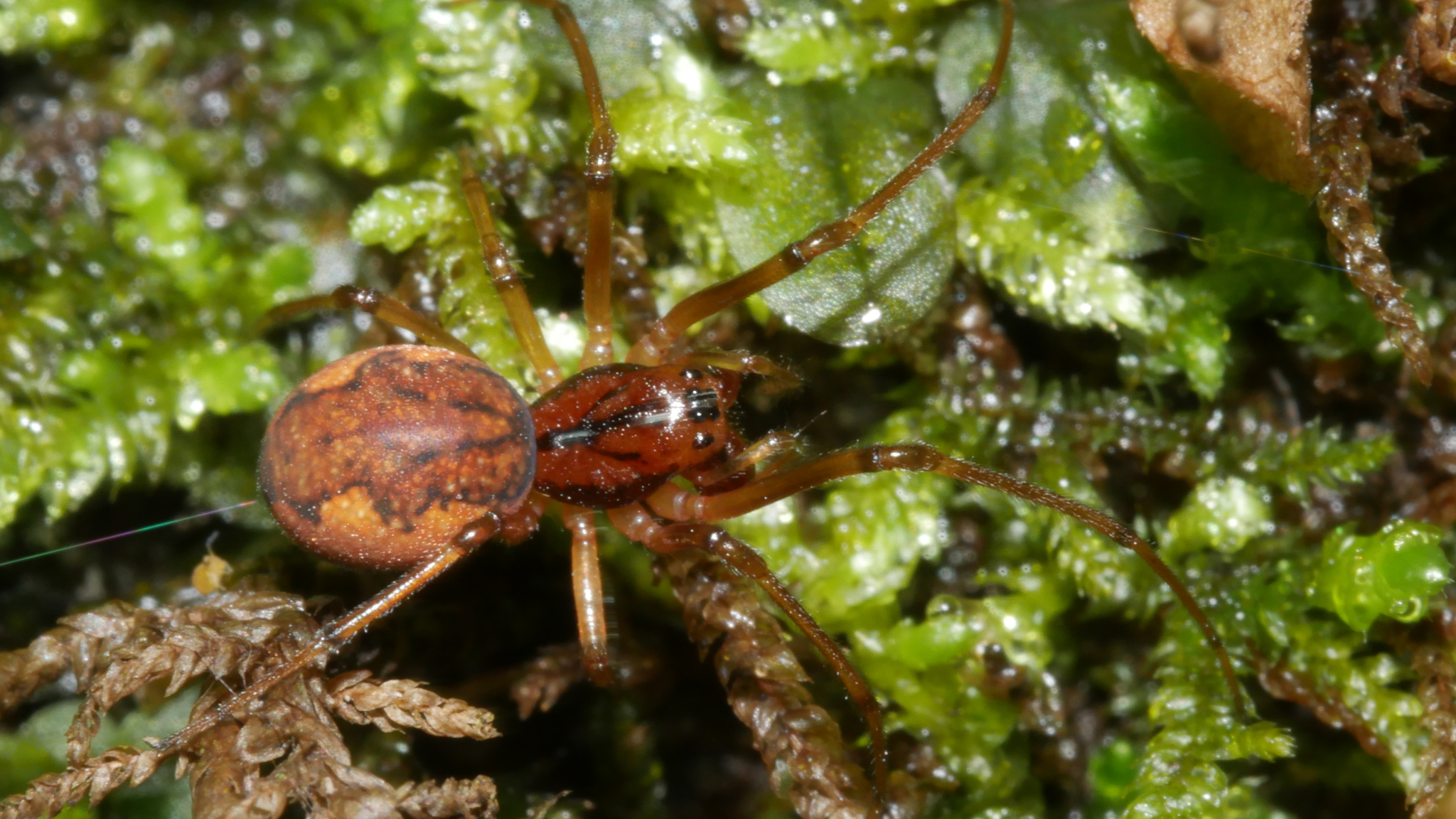

Scientific classification
- Kingdom: Animalia
- Phylum: Arthropoda
- Subphylum: Chelicerata
- Class: Arachnida
- Order: Araneae
- Infraorder: Araneomorphae
- Family: Tetragnathidae
- Genus: Pachygnatha
- Species: P. furcillata

Binomial name
- Pachygnatha furcillata Keyserling, 1884

= Pachygnatha furcillata =

Species of spider

Pachygnatha furcillata is a species of long-jawed orb weaver in the spider family Tetragnathidae. It is found in the United States.
