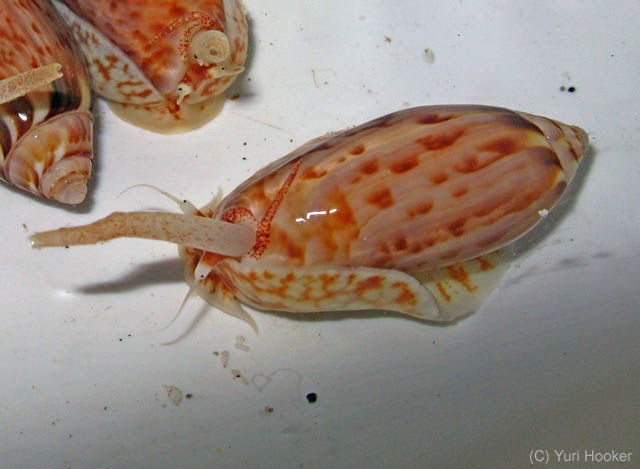
- Live Felicioliva kaleontina

Scientific classification
- Kingdom: Animalia
- Phylum: Mollusca
- Class: Gastropoda
- Subclass: Caenogastropoda
- Order: Neogastropoda
- Family: Olividae
- Subfamily: Olivinae
- Genus: Felicioliva
- Species: F. kaleontina

Binomial name
- Felicioliva kaleontina (Duclos, 1835)

Synonyms
- Oliva kaleontina Duclos, 1835; Vullietoliva kaleontina (Duclos, 1835)

= Felicioliva kaleontina =

Species of gastropod

Felicioliva kaleontina is a species of sea snail, a marine gastropod mollusc in the family Olividae, a family of what are commonly called the olive snails.

Subspecies

- Felicioliva kaleontina chimu Petuch & Berschauer, 2017
- Felicioliva kaleontina kaleontina (Duclos, 1835)

== Distribution ==
The snail is found in the Gulf of California, West Mexico and North Peru.
