= Glenognatha argyrostilba =

Scientific classification
- Kingdom: Animalia
- Phylum: Arthropoda
- Subphylum: Chelicerata
- Class: Arachnida
- Order: Araneae
- Infraorder: Araneomorphae
- Family: Tetragnathidae
- Genus: Glenognatha
- Species: G. argyrostilba

Binomial name
- Glenognatha argyrostilba (O. Pickard-Cambridge, 1876)

Synonyms
- Pachygnatha argyrostilba O. Pickard-Cambridge, 1876; Dyschiriognatha montana Simon, 1898; Glenognatha mira Bryant, 1945; Dyschiriognatha atlantica Holm, 1969; Glenognatha maelfaiti Baert, 1987; Dyschiriognatha argyrostilba Bosmans & Bosselaers, 1994

Species of spider

Glenognatha argyrostilba is a species of spider in the family Tetragnathidae.

== Distribution ==
Glenognatha argyrostilba is found across Africa and has been introduced to the Caribbean, Ecuador, Galápagos Islands, Brazil, Saint Helena, and Seychelles. In Africa, it is recorded in many countries from Egypt, Niger, Ivory Coast, Nigeria, Cameroon, Ethiopia, Democratic Republic of the Congo, and South Africa.

In South Africa, the species is known from KwaZulu-Natal and Limpopo, specifically from Ndumo Game Reserve and Luvhondo Nature Reserve.

== Habitat and ecology ==
The species usually builds webs in vegetation adjacent to streams about 25 cm to 2 m above ground level, although some individuals were found far from running water in low vegetation. The web is almost horizontal with a closed hub and few sticky spiral turns and radii. The web frame is rectangular or triangular.

In South Africa, the species has been sampled from the Savanna biome at an altitude of 140 m.

== Description ==
Both sexes are known.

== Conservation ==
Glenognatha argyrostilba is listed as Least Concern by the South African National Biodiversity Institute due to its wide geographical range.In South Africa, it is protected in Ndumo Game Reserve and Luvhondo Nature Reserve.

== Taxonomy ==
The species was originally described by Octavius Pickard-Cambridge in 1876 from Egypt as Pachygnatha argyrostilba. It was transferred to Glenognatha and redescribed by Cabra-García and Brescovit in 2016, who synonymized several species.
