= Pachygnatha tristriata =

Scientific classification
- Domain: Eukaryota
- Kingdom: Animalia
- Phylum: Arthropoda
- Subphylum: Chelicerata
- Class: Arachnida
- Order: Araneae
- Infraorder: Araneomorphae
- Family: Tetragnathidae
- Genus: Pachygnatha
- Species: P. tristriata

Binomial name
- Pachygnatha tristriata C. L. Koch, 1845

Species of spider

Pachygnatha tristriata is a species of long-jawed orb weaver in the family of spiders known as Tetragnathidae. It is found in the United States and Canada.
