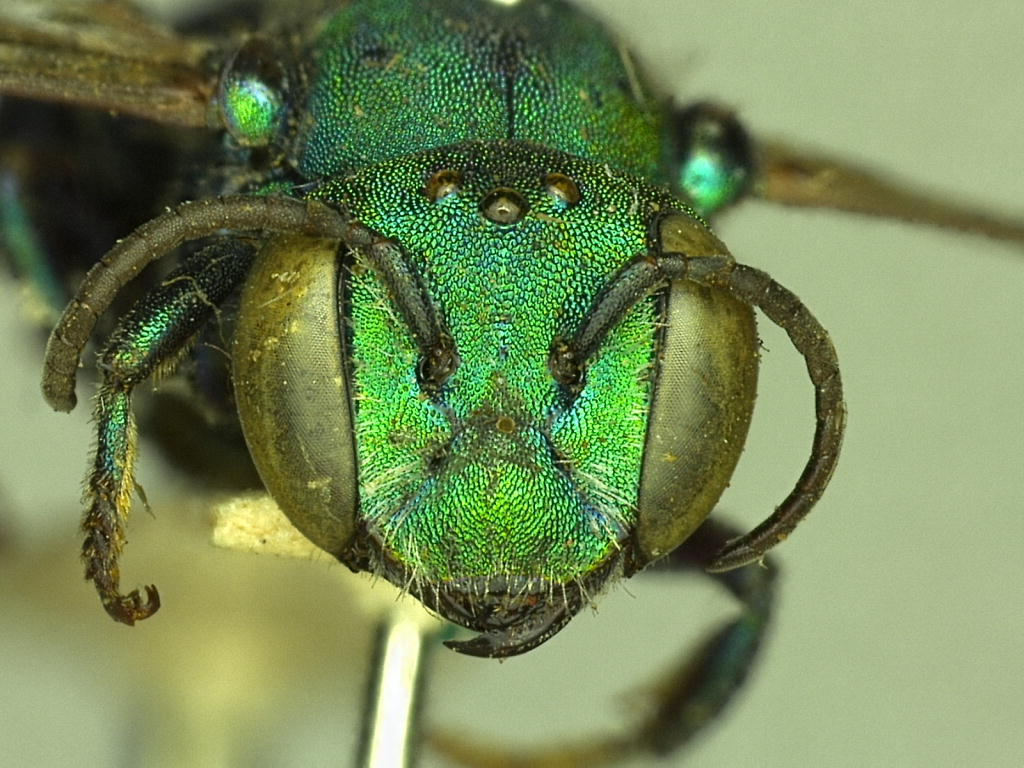

Scientific classification
- Kingdom: Animalia
- Phylum: Arthropoda
- Class: Insecta
- Order: Hymenoptera
- Family: Megachilidae
- Genus: Osmia
- Species: O. foxi

Binomial name
- Osmia foxi Cameron, 1901

= Osmia foxi =

Species of bee

Osmia foxi is a species of mason bees in the family Megachilidae. It is found in New Mexico and southeastern Arizona in the United States and in Sonora, Mexico.

The female Osmia foxi are 9.5 mm to 10.5 mm total length, and the males are 8.5 mm to 10.5 mm. The body is a brilliant metallic green to blue-green, except yellow-green on the face.
