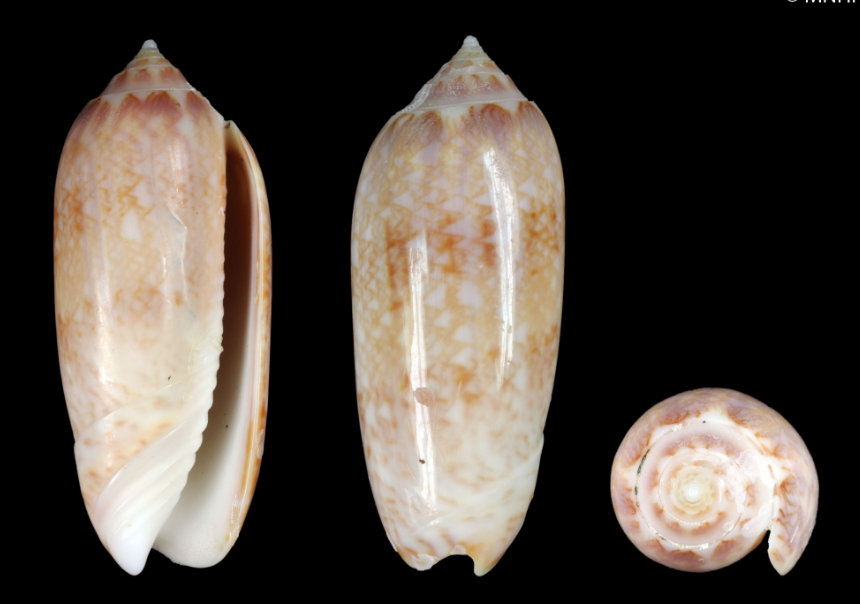
- Shell of Oliva nivosa (specimen at MNHN, Paris)

Scientific classification
- Kingdom: Animalia
- Phylum: Mollusca
- Class: Gastropoda
- Subclass: Caenogastropoda
- Order: Neogastropoda
- Family: Olividae
- Genus: Oliva
- Species: O. nivosa

Binomial name
- Oliva nivosa Marrat, 1871

Synonyms
- Americoliva nivosa (Marrat, 1871); Oliva (Americoliva) nivosa Marrat, 1871· accepted, alternate representation

= Oliva nivosa =

Species of gastropod

Oliva nivosa is a species of sea snail, a marine gastropod mollusk in the family Olividae, the olives.

== Distribution ==
This marine species occurs off French Guiana.
