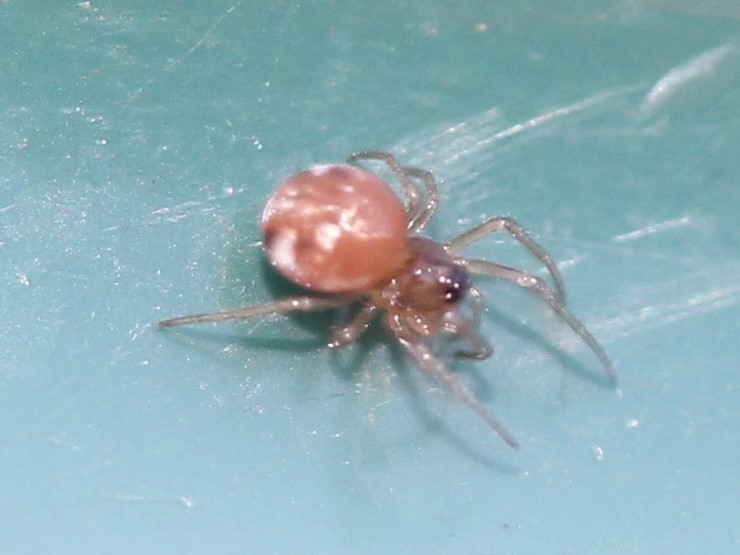

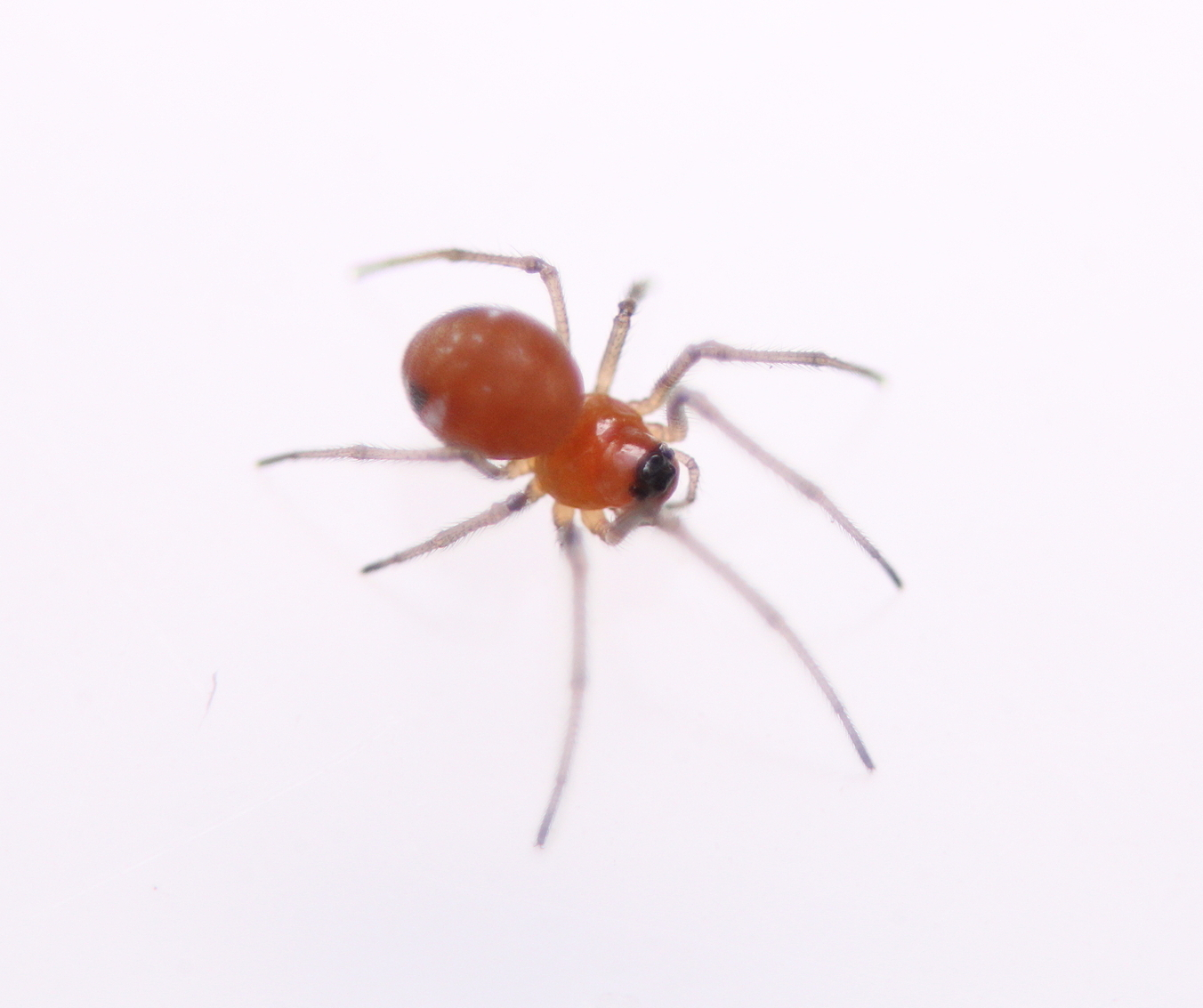

Scientific classification
- Kingdom: Animalia
- Phylum: Arthropoda
- Subphylum: Chelicerata
- Class: Arachnida
- Order: Araneae
- Infraorder: Araneomorphae
- Family: Tetragnathidae
- Genus: Glenognatha
- Species: G. foxi

Binomial name
- Glenognatha foxi (McCook, 1894)

= Glenognatha foxi =

Species of spider

Glenognatha foxi is a species of long-jawed orb weaver in the spider family Tetragnathidae. It is found in a range from Canada to Panama.
