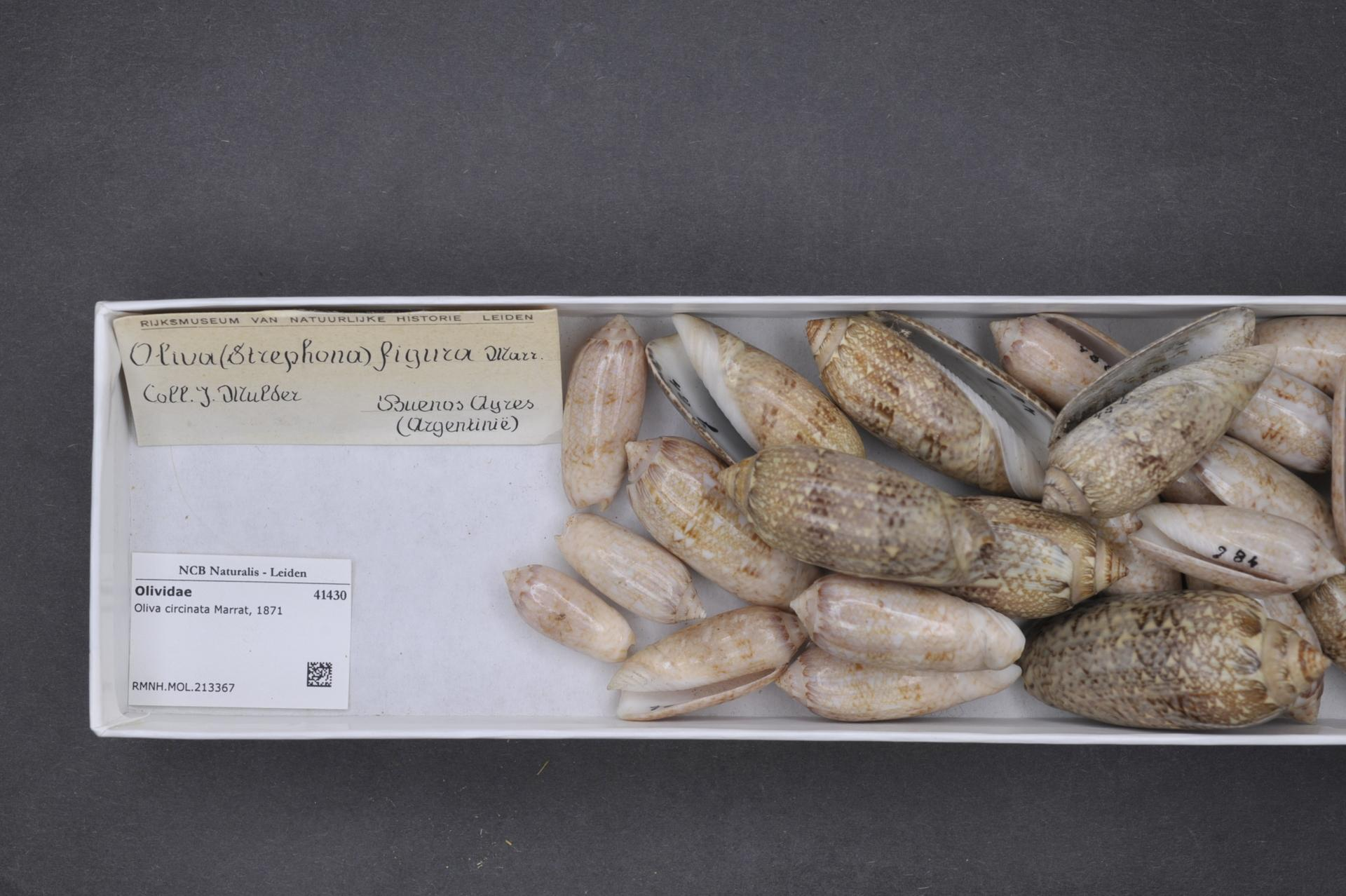

Scientific classification
- Kingdom: Animalia
- Phylum: Mollusca
- Class: Gastropoda
- Subclass: Caenogastropoda
- Order: Neogastropoda
- Family: Olividae
- Genus: Oliva
- Species: O. circinata

Binomial name
- Oliva circinata Marrat, 1871

Synonyms
- Americoliva circinata (Marrat, 1871); Oliva (Americoliva) circinata Marrat, 1871· accepted, alternate representation

= Oliva circinata =

Species of gastropod

Oliva circinata is a species of sea snail, a marine gastropod mollusk in the family Olividae, the olives.

== Subspecies ==
- Oliva circinata circinata Marrat, 1871
- Oliva circinata jorioi Petuch, 2013
- Oliva circinata tostesi Petuch, 1987

== Description ==
The length of the shell varies between 40 mm and 60 mm.

== Distribution ==
This species occurs in the Atlantic Ocean off North and East Brazil.
