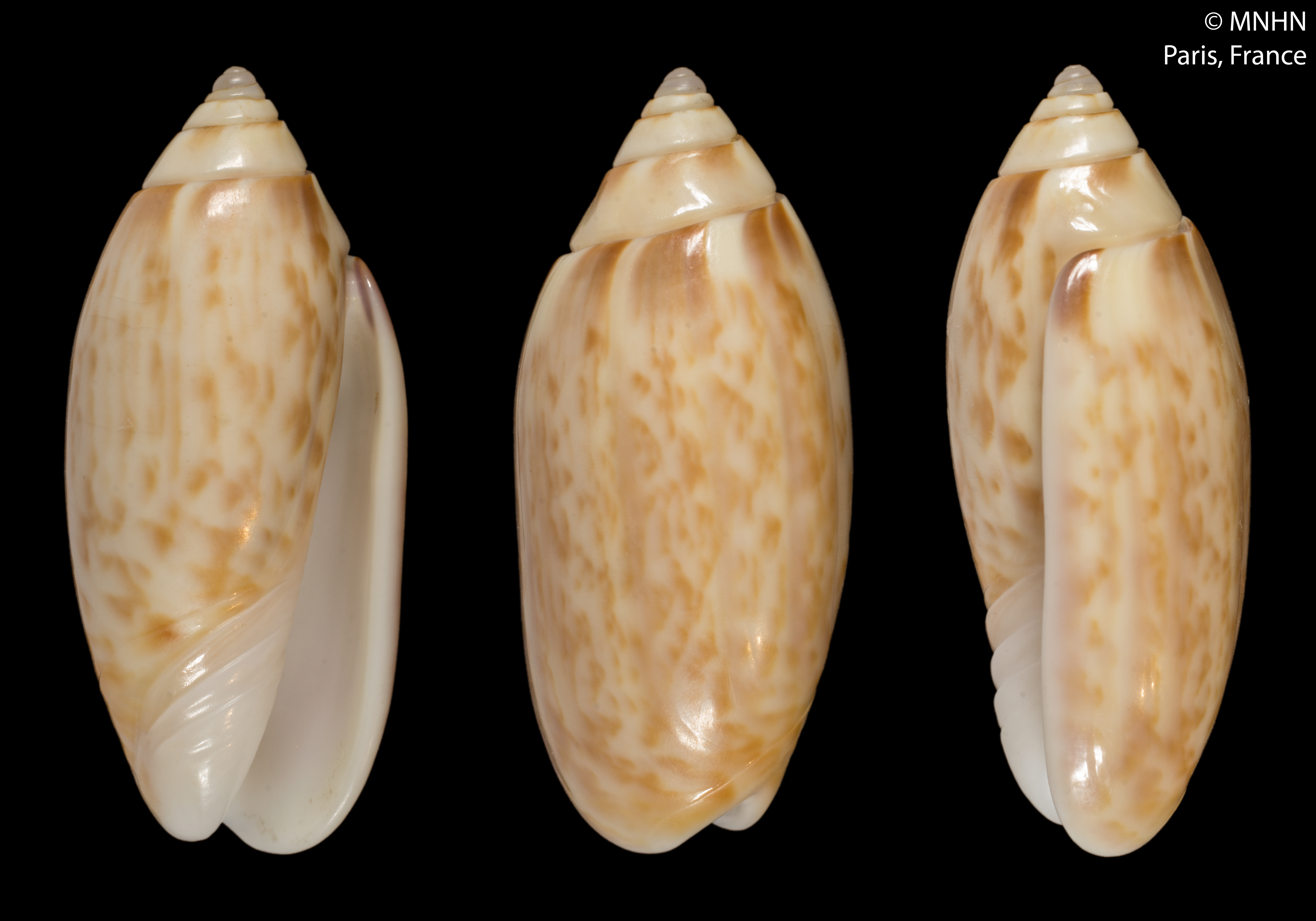
- Shell of Felicioliva kaleontina

Scientific classification
- Kingdom: Animalia
- Phylum: Mollusca
- Class: Gastropoda
- Subclass: Caenogastropoda
- Order: Neogastropoda
- Superfamily: Olivoidea
- Family: Olividae
- Subfamily: Olivinae
- Genus: Felicioliva; Petuch & Berschauer, 2017

Type species
- Oliva kaleontina Duclos, 1835

= Felicioliva =

Genus of gastropods

Felicioliva is a genus of sea snails, marine gastropod mollusks in the subfamily Olivinae of the family Olividae.

== Species ==
Species within the genus Felicioliva include:

- Felicioliva kaleontina (Duclos, 1835)
- Felicioliva peruviana (Lamarck, 1811)
