= Omosarotes foxi =

Scientific classification
- Kingdom: Animalia
- Phylum: Arthropoda
- Clade: Pancrustacea
- Class: Insecta
- Order: Coleoptera
- Suborder: Polyphaga
- Infraorder: Cucujiformia
- Family: Cerambycidae
- Genus: Omosarotes
- Species: O. foxi

Binomial name
- Omosarotes foxi (Lane, 1973)

Synonyms
- Acanthomerosternoplon foxi Lane, 1973

Species of beetle

Omosarotes foxi is a species of longhorn beetles of the subfamily Lamiinae. It is known from Pará, Brazil, and from French Guiana.

Omosarotes foxi measure 10–11 mm (0.39–0.43 in).
