= Foxy and Tom =

John Fox (born 13 November 1979 in Hull) and Tom Rhys (born Thomas Rhys Bellwood on 1 June 1979 in Wanstead, London, England), better known as Foxy and Tom, were a British radio duo who presented radio shows for Viking FM, Kerrang! Radio and 2-Ten FM.

== Background ==
The pair met at the University of Lincoln when Foxy was a Media Production student and Tom studied journalism. Both were interested in radio and got involved with the university's station Siren FM when it moved from Kingston upon Hull to Lincoln in 1999.

After this Foxy got an overnight weekend slot on his hometown station Viking FM and Tom joined soon after as the station's specialist dance show producer. Both were still full-time students at the time.

Soon after graduating in May 2001, Foxy started on Viking FM's late show - including the Top Ten at Ten and Late Night Love features. Tom moved to present the weekend overnight slot and worked on specialist dance programmes.

Programme director Stuart Baldwin first paired the two together and soon formalised the duo as Foxy and Tom in November 2001.

During this stint on the late show, they were awarded the NTL Commercial Radio Award for Best Newcomers in 2002. The judges were impressed by their 'deftness of touch' and 'irreverent humour'.

When Stephanie Hirst left Viking's breakfast show in September 2002 for Galaxy Yorkshire, Foxy and Tom were soon announced as her replacement.

In 2004, they were nominated in the Sony Radio Academy Awards 'Best Breakfast Show' category. Terry Wogan and Christian O'Connell were among the other nominees in the category won by another former Viking FM duo, JK and Joel.

The same year they were listed 10th in Campaign Magazine's Top 10 radio programmes in the UK.

In 2005, they beat off competition from Kiss FM's Bam Bam@Breakfast and Kev Seed at Radio City to be named EMAP's best breakfast show.

In July 2006, they moved from EMAP to GCap when they started the breakfast show on 2-Ten FM, based in Reading and serving Berkshire and North Hampshire.

On 30 November 2007, Tom left the company and the show was re-branded as "2ten at Breakfast" with a note on the website to say that Tom had 'moved on to pastures new'.

John Fox has since moved on from 2ten to present the BRMB, later re-branded FREE Radio, breakfast show.
