= Vullietoliva foxi =

Scientific classification
- Kingdom: Animalia
- Phylum: Mollusca
- Class: Gastropoda
- Subclass: Caenogastropoda
- Order: Neogastropoda
- Family: Olividae
- Genus: Vullietoliva
- Species: V. foxi

Binomial name
- Vullietoliva foxi (Stingley, 1984)

Synonyms
- Oliva foxi

Species of gastropod

Vullietoliva foxi is a species of sea snail, a marine gastropod mollusk in the family Olividae, the olives.
