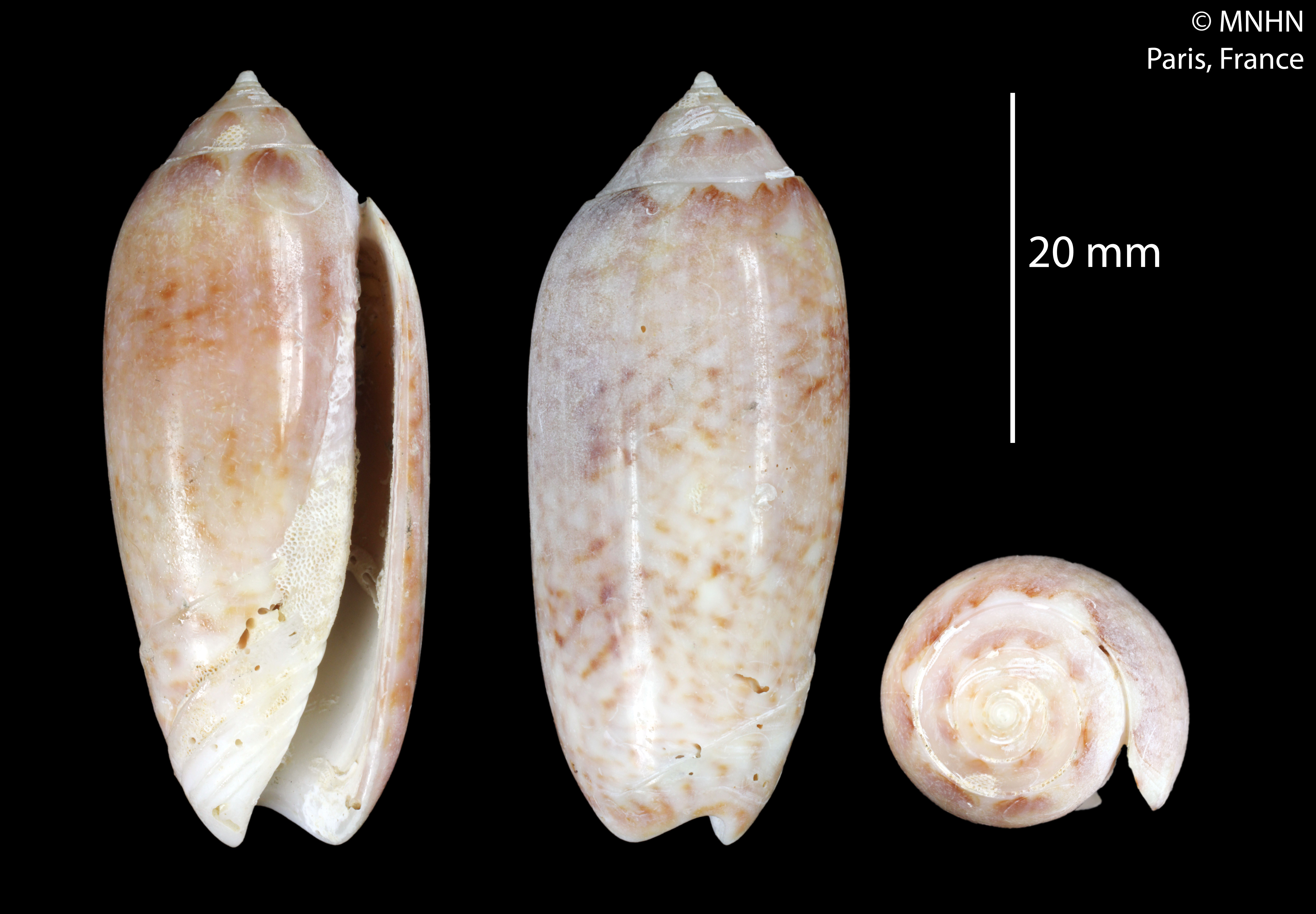
- Shell of Oliva ozodona (specimen at MNHN, Paris)

Scientific classification
- Kingdom: Animalia
- Phylum: Mollusca
- Class: Gastropoda
- Subclass: Caenogastropoda
- Order: Neogastropoda
- Family: Olividae
- Genus: Oliva
- Species: O. ozodona

Binomial name
- Oliva ozodona Duclos, 1835

Synonyms
- Oliva (Acutoliva) nitidula Duclos, 1835; Oliva paxillus Reeve, 1850; Olivella paxillus Reeve, 1850; Omogymna nitidula (Duclos, 1835)

= Oliva ozodona =

Species of gastropod

Oliva ozodona is a species of sea snail, a marine gastropod mollusk in the family Olividae, the olives.

Subspecies

- Oliva ozodona nellyae T. Cossignani, 2017
- Oliva ozodona nitidula Duclos, 1835
- Oliva ozodona ozodona Duclos, 1835
- Oliva ozodona sandwicensis Pease, 1860

== Distribution ==
This marine species occurs off French Guiana and in Melanesia to the Philippines
