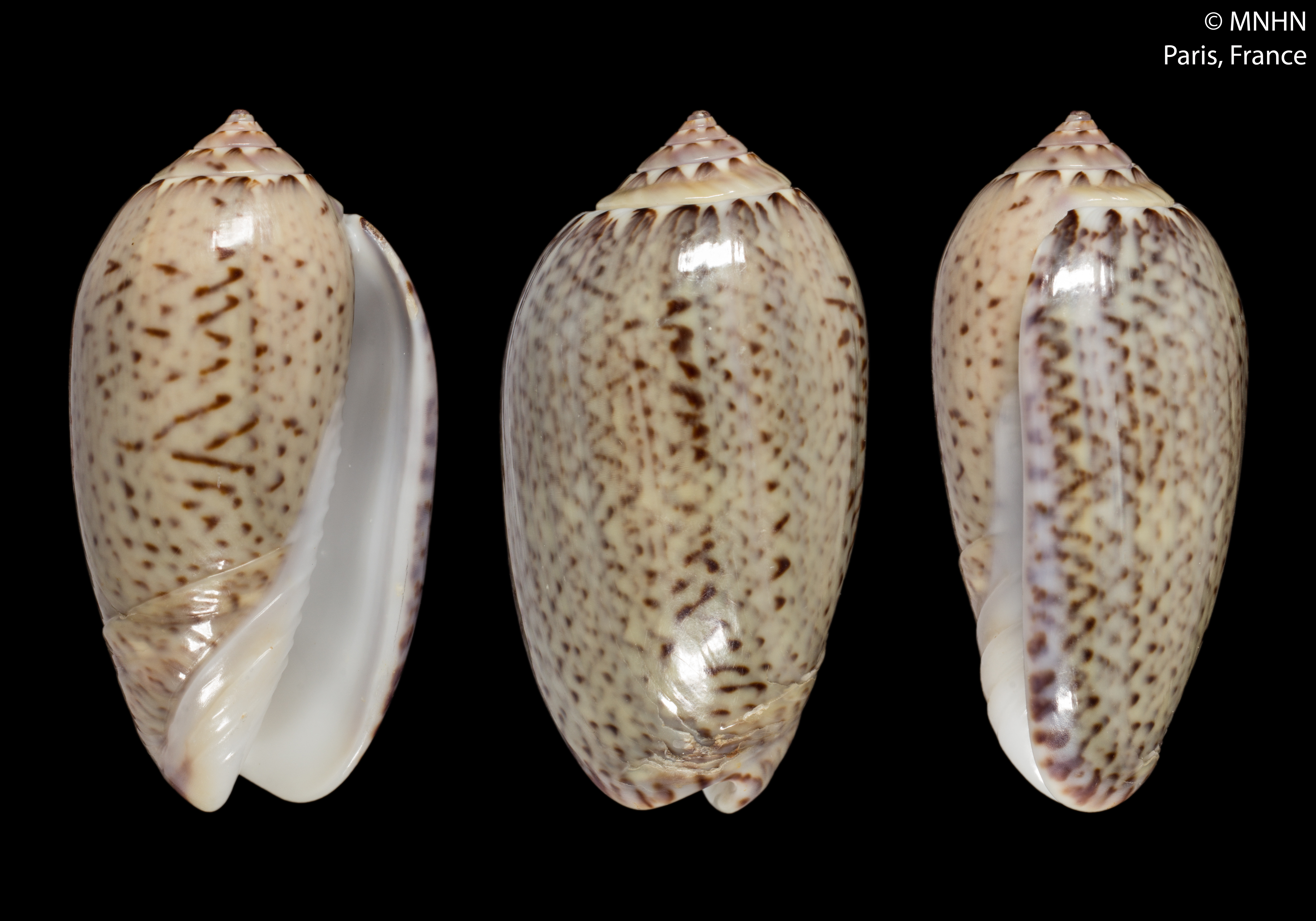
- Shell of Oliva polpasta (syntype at MNHN, Paris)

Scientific classification
- Kingdom: Animalia
- Phylum: Mollusca
- Class: Gastropoda
- Subclass: Caenogastropoda
- Order: Neogastropoda
- Family: Olividae
- Genus: Oliva
- Species: O. polpasta

Binomial name
- Oliva polpasta Duclos, 1833

Subspecies
- Oliva polpasta polpasta; Oliva polpasta radix

Synonyms
- Americoliva polpasta (Duclos, 1833); Oliva (Americoliva) polpasta Duclos, 1833· accepted, alternate representation

= Oliva polpasta =

Species of gastropod

Oliva polpasta is a species of sea snail, a marine gastropod mollusc in the family Olividae, the olives.

== Subspecies ==
- Oliva polpasta polpasta Duclos, 1833
- Oliva polpasta radix Petuch & Sargent, 1986

== Description ==
The length of the shell varies between 19 mm and 50 mm.

== Distribution ==
This marine species occurs in the Gulf of California of Peru.
