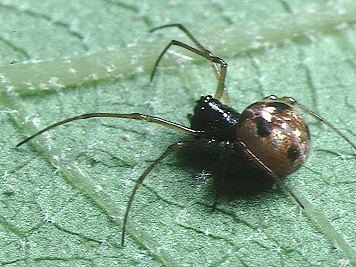
- Female Glenognatha dentata from Okinawa
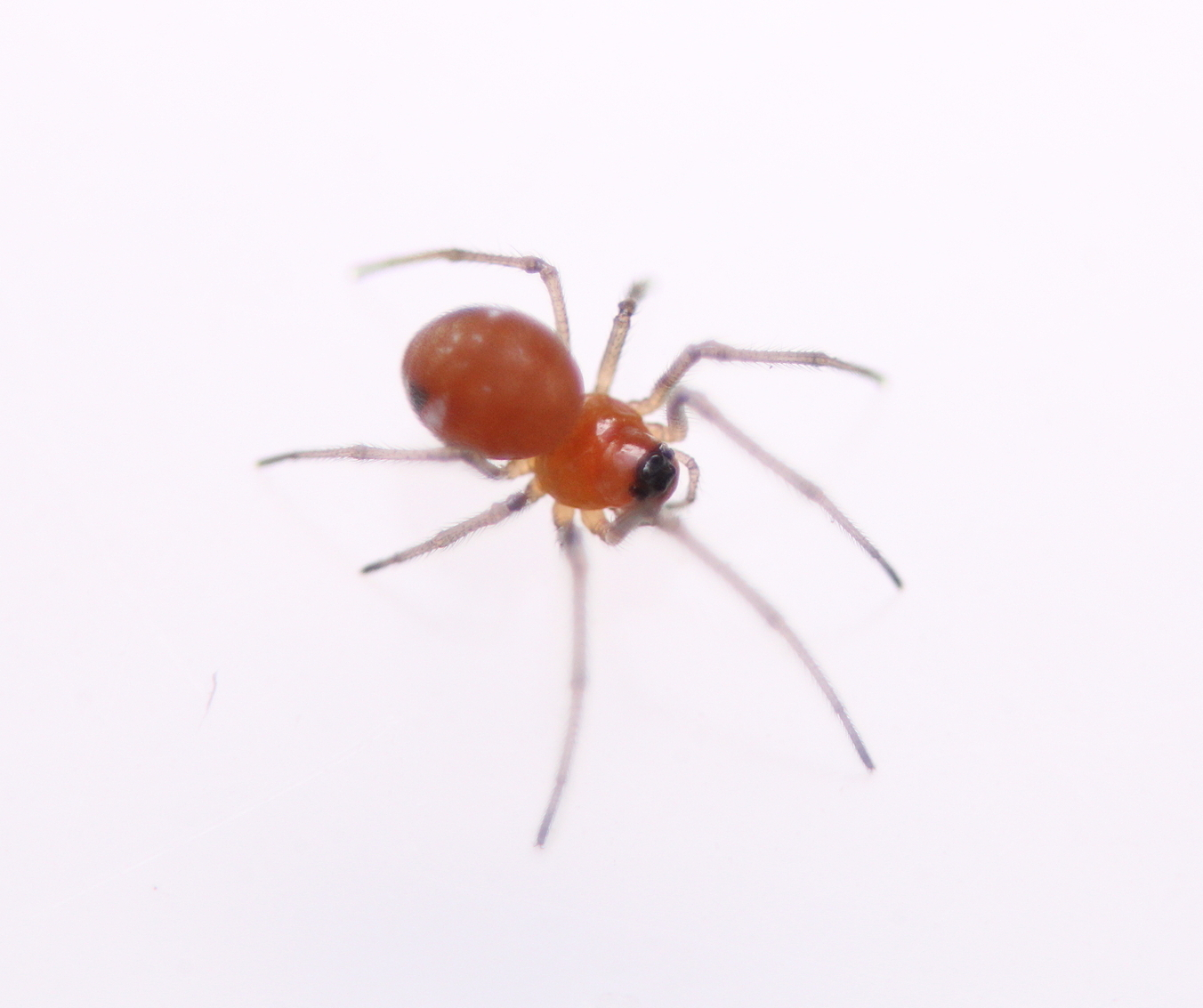
- Glenognatha foxi from Ohio

Scientific classification
- Kingdom: Animalia
- Phylum: Arthropoda
- Subphylum: Chelicerata
- Class: Arachnida
- Order: Araneae
- Infraorder: Araneomorphae
- Family: Tetragnathidae
- Genus: Glenognatha; Simon, 1887

Type species
- G. emertoni Simon, 1887

Species
- 37, see text

= Glenognatha =

Genus of spiders

Glenognatha is a genus of long-jawed orb-weavers that was first described by Eugène Louis Simon in 1887. It was considerably revised in 2016.

== Distribution ==
Species in this genus are found in North America, Central America, Asia, South America, the Caribbean, Africa, on the French Polynesian Islands, and Saint Helena.

== Description ==
Glenognatha species have a total length of 3-5 mm for both females and males.

The carapace is pear-shaped, dark and shiny, slightly punctuated, and anteriorly truncated. The eye region is elevated with eyes prominent in two rows, the anterior median eyes being the smallest.

In males, the chelicerae are long and robust. The abdomen is round and shiny, usually with dark spots. The legs are long, especially the first two pairs, and spines are absent.

== Life style ==
Glenognatha species were sampled between vegetation under leaves in the forest understory from the ground layer. They construct horizontal, asymmetrical orb-webs with a tight mesh having closely set spirals and numerous radii. They attach small pieces of debris to the web under which they hide when disturbed. The web, stabilimentum and cryptic posture are very similar to those of Uloborus.

== Species ==
As of October 2025, this genus includes 37 species:

- Glenognatha argenteoguttata (Berland, 1935) – Marquesas Is.
- Glenognatha argyrostilba (O. Pickard-Cambridge, 1876) – Egypt, Niger, Ivory Coast, Nigeria, Cameroon, Ethiopia, DR Congo, South Africa. Introduced to Caribbean, Ecuador, Galapagos, Brazil, St. Helena, Seychelles
- Glenognatha australis (Keyserling, 1883) – Ecuador to Argentina
- Glenognatha boraceia Cabra-García & Brescovit, 2016 – Brazil
- Glenognatha caaguara Cabra-García & Brescovit, 2016 – Brazil
- Glenognatha camisea Cabra-García & Brescovit, 2016 – Peru
- Glenognatha caparu Cabra-García & Brescovit, 2016 – Colombia, Venezuela, Suriname, Peru, Brazil, Bolivia
- Glenognatha caporiaccoi Platnick, 1993 – Guyana
- Glenognatha chamberlini (Berland, 1942) – French Polynesia (Austral Is.)
- Glenognatha dentata (Zhu & Wen, 1978) – China, India, Bangladesh, Myanmar, Vietnam, Philippines
- Glenognatha dubiosa Benjamin, 2024 – Sri Lanka
- Glenognatha emertoni Simon, 1887 – United States (type species)
- Glenognatha florezi Cabra-García & Brescovit, 2016 – Colombia
- Glenognatha foxi (McCook, 1894) – Canada to Panama
- Glenognatha ganeshi (Bodkhe, Manthen & Tanikawa, 2014) – India
- Glenognatha gaujoni Simon, 1895 – Ecuador, Colombia, Venezuela, Peru, Brazil
- Glenognatha globosa (Petrunkevitch, 1925) – Panama, Colombia, Venezuela
- Glenognatha gloriae (Petrunkevitch, 1930) – Puerto Rico
- Glenognatha gouldi Cabra-García & Brescovit, 2016 – United States, Mexico
- Glenognatha heleios Hormiga, 1990 – United States
- Glenognatha hirsutissima (Berland, 1935) – Marquesas Is.
- Glenognatha iviei Levi, 1980 – United States
- Glenognatha januari Cabra-García & Brescovit, 2016 – Brazil
- Glenognatha lacteovittata (Mello-Leitão, 1944) – Ecuador, Peru, Brazil, Argentina, Paraguay, Uruguay
- Glenognatha ledouxi Dierkens, 2016 – French Polynesia (Society Is.: Tahiti)
- Glenognatha mendezi Cabra-García & Brescovit, 2016 – Costa Rica, Colombia, Ecuador
- Glenognatha minuta Banks, 1898 – Mexico, Guatemala, Costa Rica, Panama, Cuba, Dominican Rep.
- Glenognatha nigromaculata (Berland, 1933) – Marquesas Is.
- Glenognatha osawai Baba & Tanikawa, 2018 – Japan
- Glenognatha patriceae Cabra-García & Brescovit, 2016 – Colombia
- Glenognatha paullula Sankaran, Caleb & Sebastian, 2020 – India
- Glenognatha phalangiops (Berland, 1942) – French Polynesia (Austral Is.)
- Glenognatha smilodon Bosmans & Bosselaers, 1994 – Cameroon
- Glenognatha spherella Chamberlin & Ivie, 1936 – Mexico to Peru
- Glenognatha tangi (Zhu, Song & Zhang, 2003) – China, Myanmar
- Glenognatha timbira Cabra-García & Brescovit, 2016 – Brazil
- Glenognatha vivianae Cabra-García & Brescovit, 2016 – Brazil

In synonymy:

- G. atlantica (Holm, 1969) = Glenognatha argyrostilba (O. Pickard-Cambridge, 1876)
- G. centralis Chamberlin, 1925 = Glenognatha minuta Banks, 1898
- G. hawigtenera (Barrion & Litsinger, 1995) = Glenognatha dentata (Zhu & Wen, 1978)
- G. maelfaiti Baert, 1987 = Glenognatha argyrostilba (O. Pickard-Cambridge, 1876)
- G. mira Bryant, 1945 = Glenognatha argyrostilba (O. Pickard-Cambridge, 1876)
- G. montana (Simon, 1897) = Glenognatha argyrostilba (O. Pickard-Cambridge, 1876)
