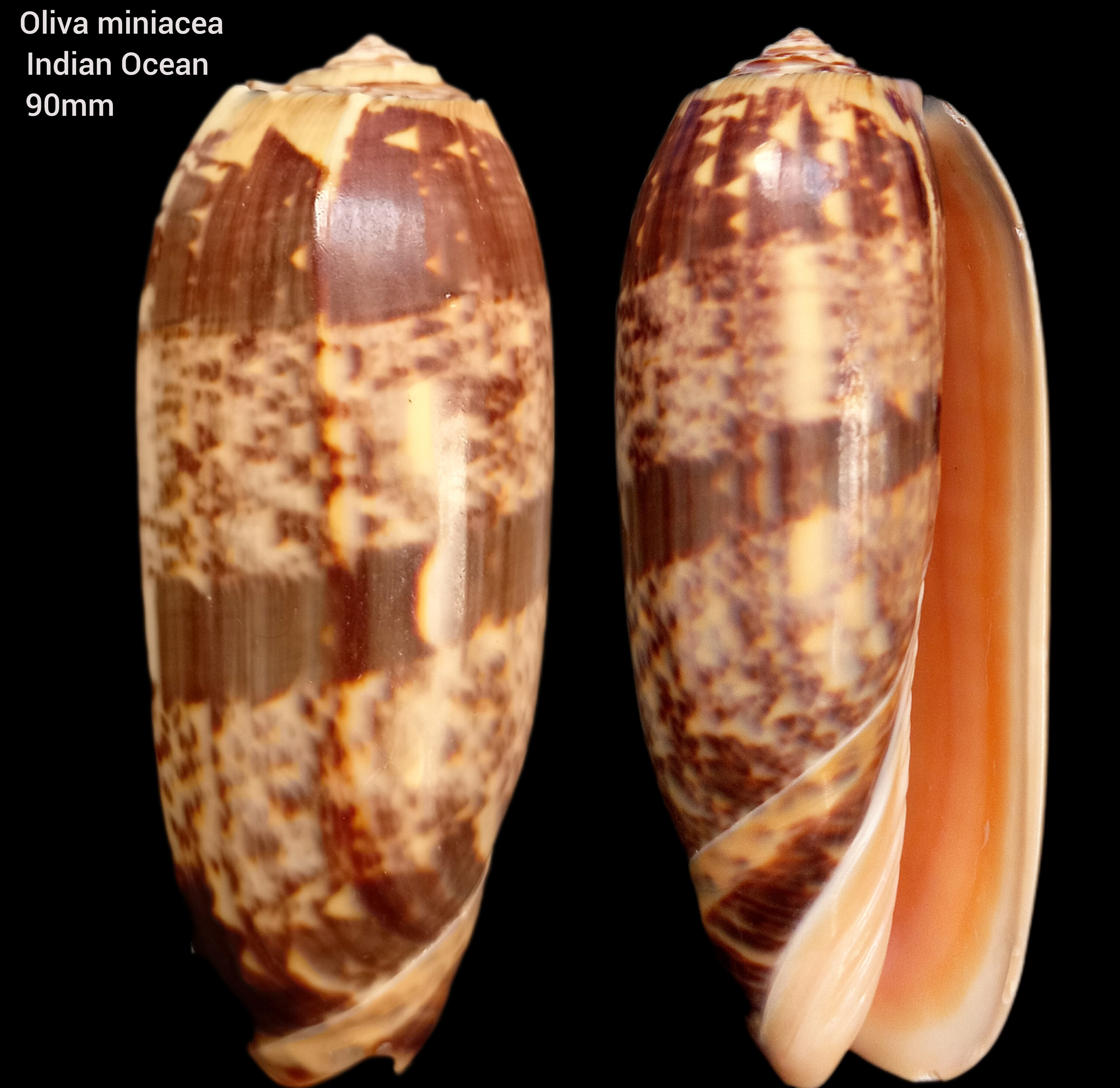

Scientific classification
- Kingdom: Animalia
- Phylum: Mollusca
- Class: Gastropoda
- Subclass: Caenogastropoda
- Order: Neogastropoda
- Superfamily: Olivoidea
- Family: Olividae
- Subfamily: Olivinae; Latreille, 1825

Synonyms
- Dactylidae H. Adams & A. Adams, 1853

= Olivinae =

Subfamily of gastropod

Olivinae is a subfamily of sea snails, marine gastropod mollusks in the family Olividae, the olives.

== Genera ==
The following genera are accepted within Olivinae:

- Felicioliva Petuch & Berschauer, 2017
- Oliva Bruguière, 1789
- Recourtoliva Petuch & Berschauer, 2017
- Vullietoliva Petuch & Berschauer, 2017

Synonyms

- Acutoliva Petuch & Sargent, 1986: synonym of Oliva (Acutoliva) Petuch & Sargent, 1986 represented as Oliva Bruguière, 1789
- Americoliva Petuch, 2013: synonym of Oliva (Americoliva) Petuch, 2013 represented as Oliva Bruguière, 1789
- Annulatoliva Petuch & Sargent, 1986: synonym of Oliva (Annulatoliva) Petuch & Sargent, 1986 represented as Oliva Bruguière, 1789
- Carmione Gray, 1858: synonym of Oliva (Carmione) Gray, 1858 represented as Oliva Bruguière, 1789
- Galeola Gray, 1858: synonym of Oliva (Galeola) Gray, 1858 represented as Oliva Bruguière, 1789(original rank)
- Miniaceoliva Petuch & Sargent, 1986: synonym of Oliva (Miniaceoliva) Petuch & Sargent, 1986 represented as Oliva Bruguière, 1789
- Omogymna E. von Martens, 1897: synonym of Oliva (Omogymna) E. von Martens, 1897 represented as Oliva Bruguière, 1789
- Porphyria Röding, 1798: synonym of Oliva (Porphyria) Röding, 1798 represented as Oliva Bruguière, 1789
- Strephona Gray, 1847: synonym of Porphyria Röding, 1798: synonym of Oliva (Porphyria) Röding, 1798 represented as Oliva Bruguière, 1789(junior objective synonym)
- Strephopoma [sic]: synonym of Strephona Gray, 1847: synonym of Porphyria Röding, 1798: synonym of Oliva (Porphyria) Röding, 1798 represented as Oliva Bruguière, 17899 (misspelling)
- Viduoliva Petuch & Sargent, 1986: synonym of Oliva (Viduoliva) Petuch & Sargent, 1986 represented as Oliva Bruguière, 1789
