= Oliva mustelina virgata =

Scientific classification
- Kingdom: Animalia
- Phylum: Mollusca
- Class: Gastropoda
- Subclass: Caenogastropoda
- Order: Neogastropoda
- Family: Olividae
- Genus: Oliva
- Species: O. mustelina
- Subspecies: O. m. virgata

Trinomial name
- Oliva mustelina virgata Sterba, 2005

Synonyms
- Oliva virgata

Subspecies of gastropod

Oliva mustelina virgata is a subspecies of the sea snail species Oliva mustelina, a marine gastropod mollusk in the family Olividae, the olives.
