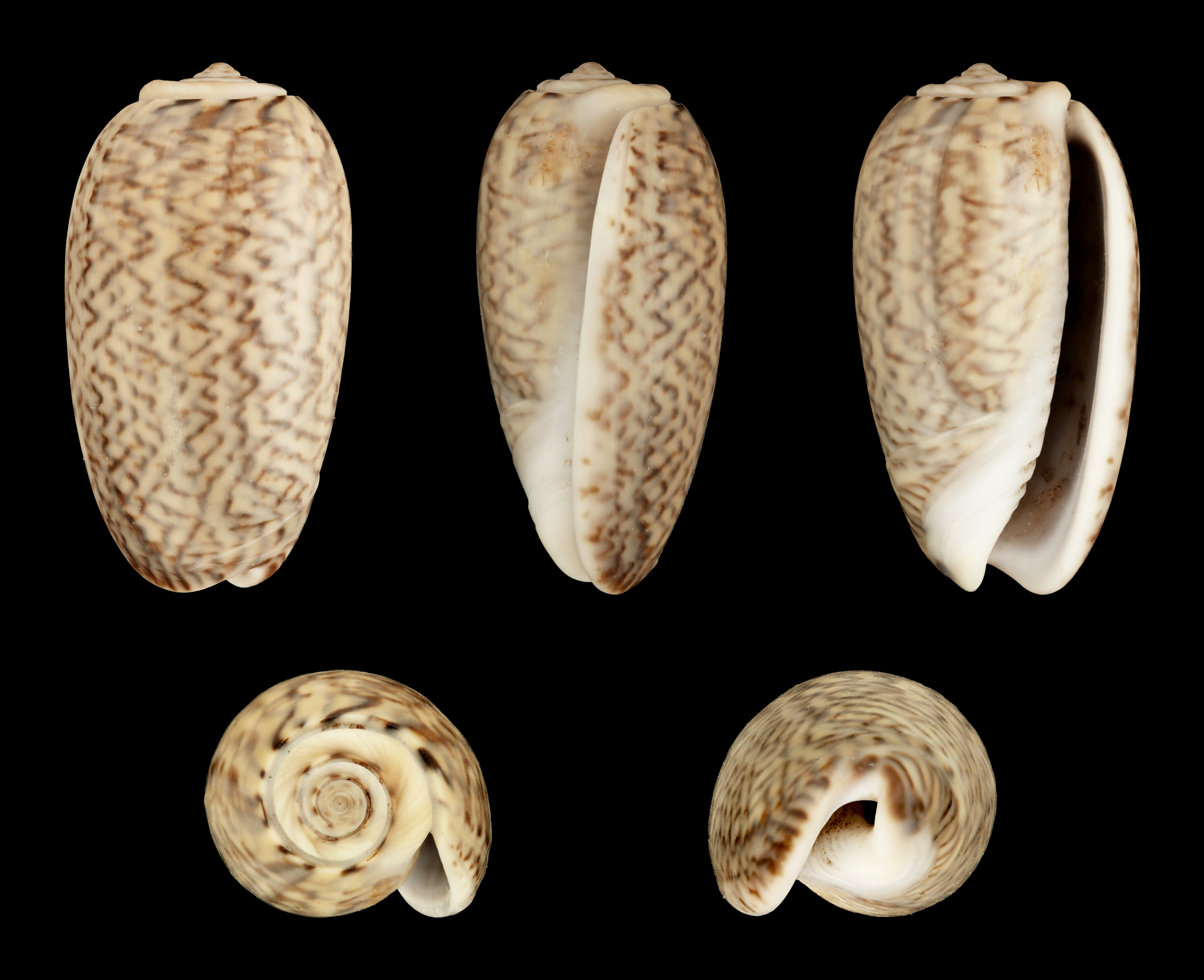

Scientific classification
- Kingdom: Animalia
- Phylum: Mollusca
- Class: Gastropoda
- Subclass: Caenogastropoda
- Order: Neogastropoda
- Family: Olividae
- Genus: Oliva
- Species: O. mustelina

Binomial name
- Oliva mustelina Lamarck, 1811

Subspecies
- Oliva mustelina virgata

= Oliva mustelina =

Species of gastropod

Oliva mustelina is a species of sea snail, a marine gastropod mollusk in the family Olividae, the olives.
