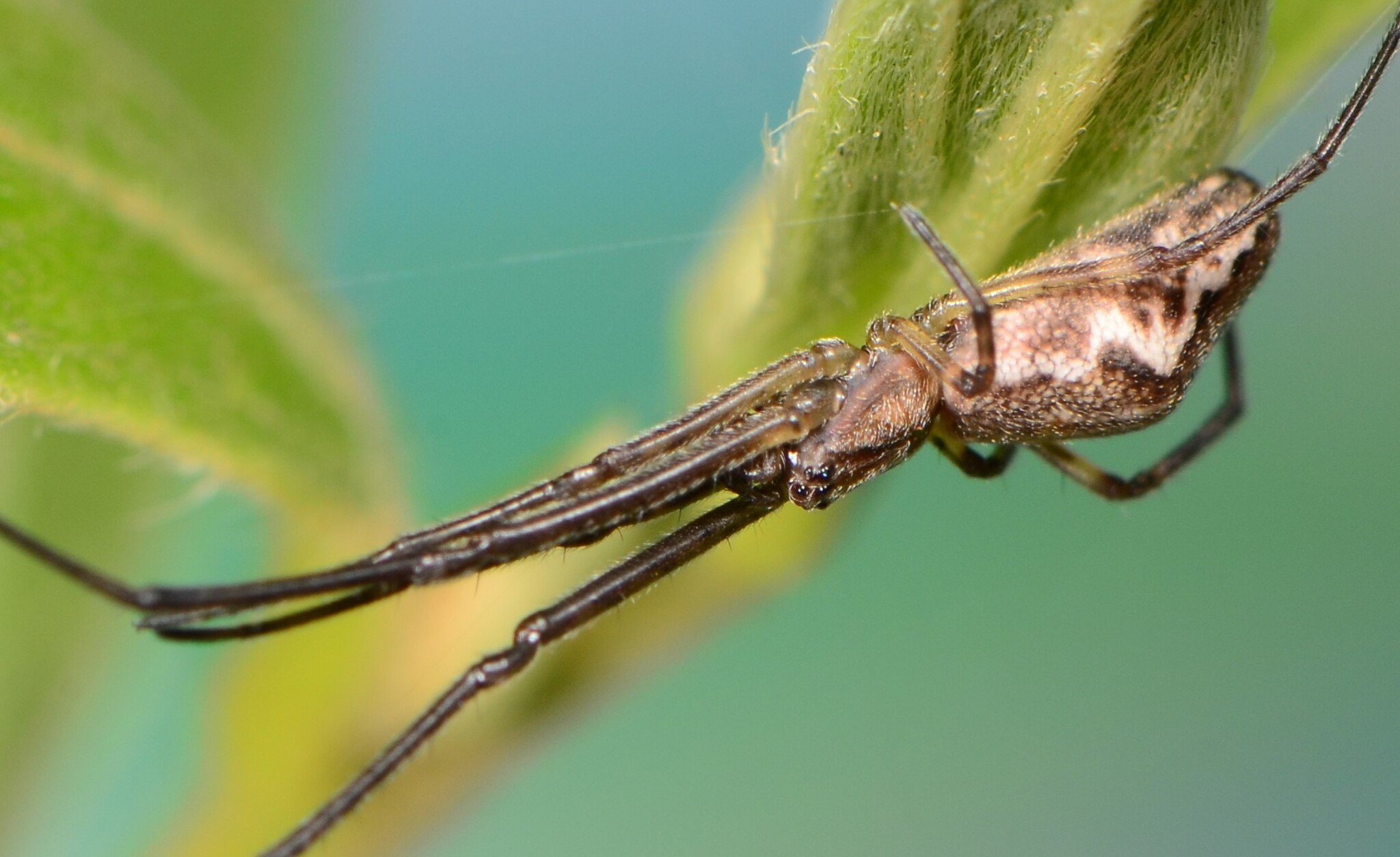
- female
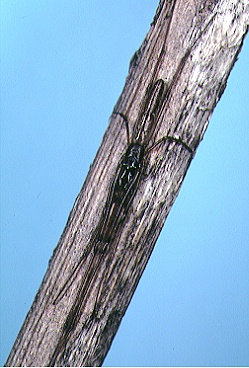
- male

Scientific classification
- Kingdom: Animalia
- Phylum: Arthropoda
- Subphylum: Chelicerata
- Class: Arachnida
- Order: Araneae
- Infraorder: Araneomorphae
- Family: Tetragnathidae
- Genus: Tetragnatha
- Species: T. ceylonica

Binomial name
- Tetragnatha ceylonica O. Pickard-Cambridge, 1869

Synonyms
- Meta gracilis Stoliczka, 1869; Tetragnatha latifrons Thorell, 1877; Tetragnatha fronto Thorell, 1890; Tetragnatha tridens Thorell, 1898; Tetragnatha gracilis Pocock, 1900; Tetragnatha modesta Hirst, 1911; Tetragnatha eitapensis Strand, 1913

= Tetragnatha ceylonica =

Ceylonica Long-jawed Spider

Species of spider

Tetragnatha ceylonica is a species of spider in the family Tetragnathidae. It occurs widely across Asia and parts of Africa, and is commonly known as Ceylonica long-jawed spider.

== Distribution ==
Tetragnatha ceylonica is widely distributed across Mozambique, South Africa, Seychelles, India, Thailand, Philippines, New Guinea, and Japan (Ryukyu Islands).

In South Africa, the species has been sampled from four provinces.

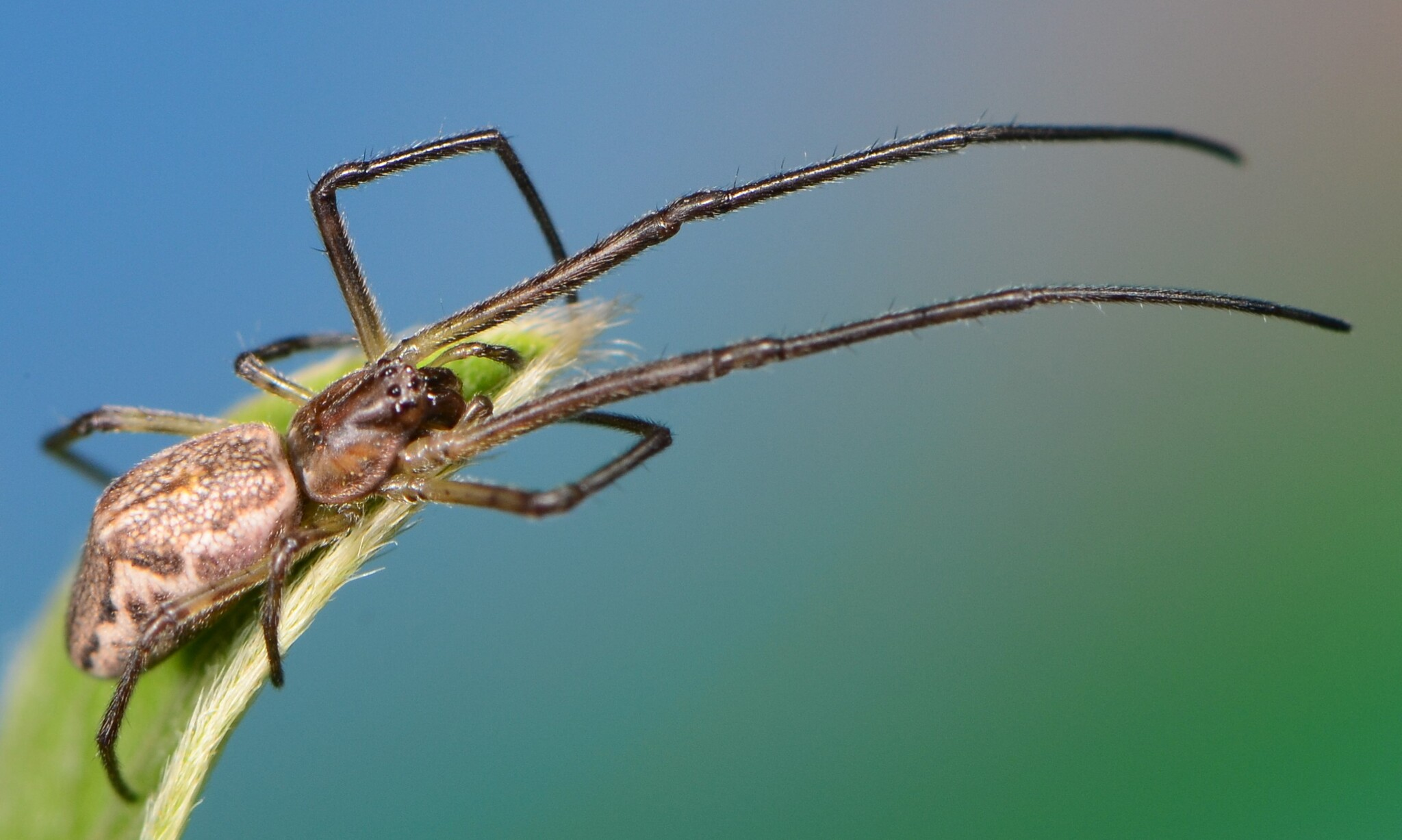
female

== Habitat and ecology ==
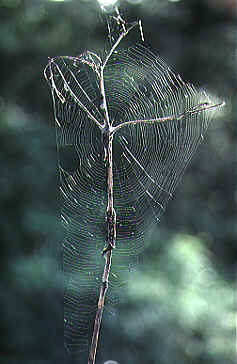
Web

The webs of Tetragnatha ceylonica are generally found on trees where the orb web is supported by a twig running parallel to the median portion of the web. The spider always rests with its legs stretched out on the supporting twig.

In South Africa, the species has been sampled from most floral biomes except the Succulent Karoo and Desert biomes, at altitudes ranging from 15 to 1703 m.

== Description ==
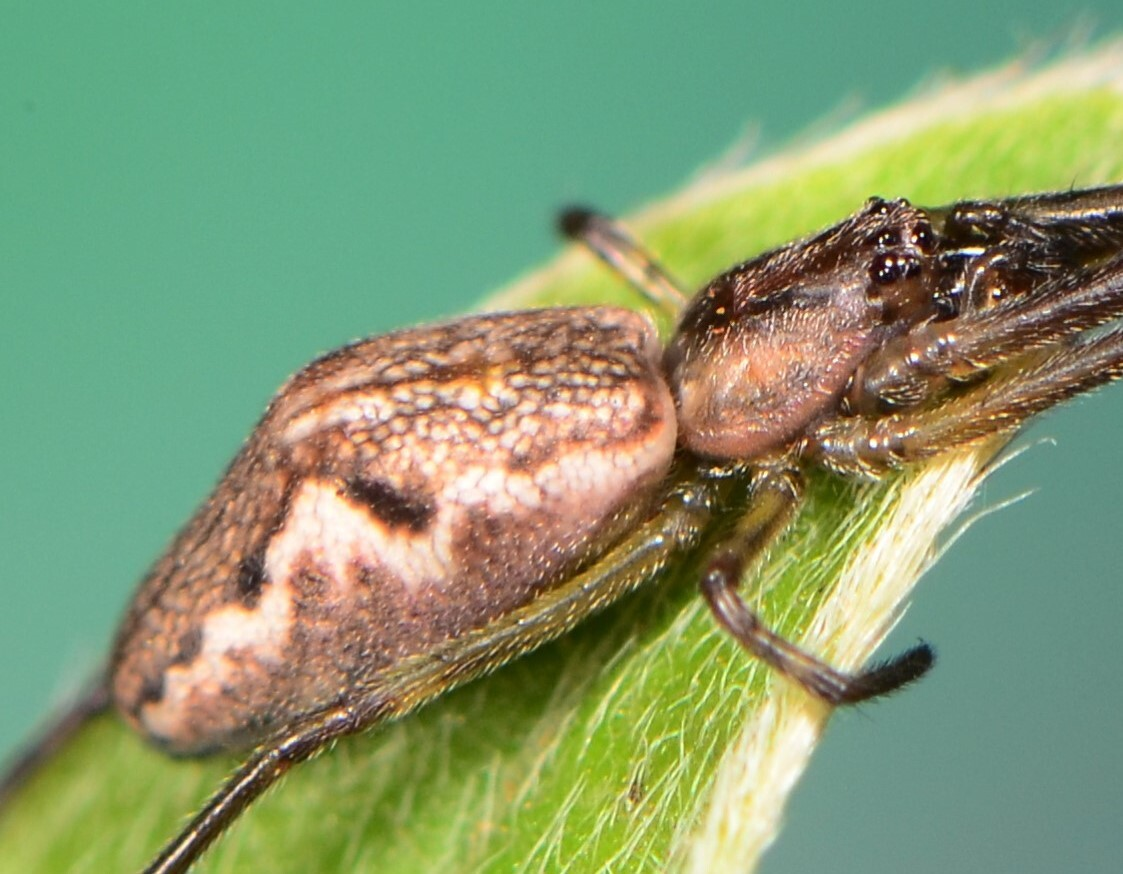
female

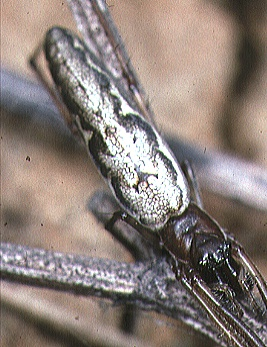
female

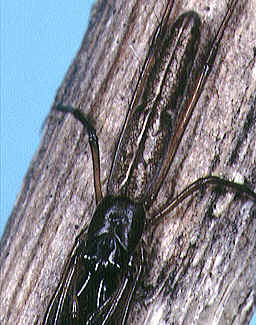
male

== Conservation ==
Tetragnatha ceylonica is listed as Least Concern due to its wide geographical range spanning multiple countries across Asia and Africa. The species is protected in several reserves in South Africa, including Ndumo Game Reserve, De Hoop Nature Reserve, Bontebok National Park, and Swartberg Nature Reserve. There are no significant threats to the species.

== Taxonomy ==
The species was reviewed by Okuma and Dippenaar-Schoeman in 1988. Both sexes are known and have been described.
