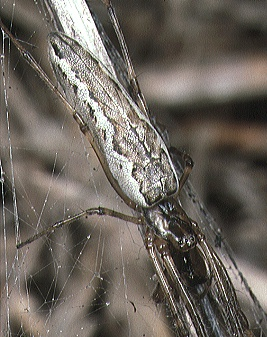
- female
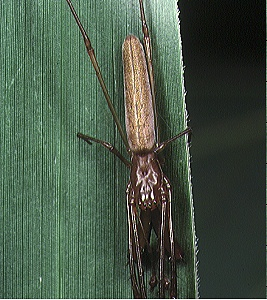
- male

Scientific classification
- Kingdom: Animalia
- Phylum: Arthropoda
- Subphylum: Chelicerata
- Class: Arachnida
- Order: Araneae
- Infraorder: Araneomorphae
- Family: Tetragnathidae
- Genus: Tetragnatha
- Species: T. nitens

Binomial name
- Tetragnatha nitens (Audouin, 1826)

Synonyms
- T. nitens synonyms: Eugnatha nitens Audouin, 1826; Eugnatha pelusia Audouin, 1826; T. gracilis Lucas, 1838; T. pelusia Walckenaer, 1841; T. deinognatha Walckenaer, 1841; Deinagnatha dandridgei White, 1846; T. extensa Nicolet, 1849; T. labialis Nicolet, 1849; T. molesta O. Pickard-Cambridge, 1872; T. ferox L. Koch, 1872; T. gulosa L. Koch, 1872; T. ejuncida Simon, 1874; T. peruviana Taczanowski, 1878; T. typica Urquhart, 1890; T. antillana Simon, 1898; T. vicina Simon, 1898; T. galapagoensis Banks, 1902; T. americana Simon, 1905; T. dandridgei Chamberlin, 1920; T. aptans Chamberlin, 1920; Cyrtognatha producta Franganillo, 1930; T. decipiens Badcock, 1932; T. steckleri Gertsch & Ivie, 1936; T. seminola Gertsch, 1936; T. apheles Chamberlin & Ivie, 1936; T. elmora Chamberlin & Ivie, 1942; T. festina Bryant, 1945; T. tullgreni Caporiacco, 1947; T. eremita Bücherl, 1959; T. hotingchiehi Schenkel, 1963; T. andina Okuma, 1983; T. fuerteventurensis Wunderlich, 1992; T. caporiaccoi Platnick, 1993

= Tetragnatha nitens =

Nitens Long-jawed Spider

Species of spider

Tetragnatha nitens is a species of long-jawed orb weaver in the spider family Tetragnathidae. It is found in Asia, has been introduced into the Americas, Madeira, Canary Islands, Europe, Egypt, Madagascar, Pacific islands, and New Zealand.

== Distribution ==
Tetragnatha nitens has a cosmotropical distribution across tropical and subtropical Asia and has been introduced to the Americas, Macaronesia, the Mediterranean, Saint Helena, South Africa, Madagascar, Pacific Islands, and New Zealand. In South Africa, the species is known from six provinces, including five protected areas, at altitudes ranging from sea level to 1399 m.

== Habitat and ecology ==
These spiders construct orb webs in vegetation. At Roodeplaatdam, specimens were sampled during the day from trees next to the dam. The species has been sampled from Fynbos, Grassland, Indian Ocean Coastal Belt, Savanna, and Thicket biomes.

== Description ==
T. nitens exhibits the elongated body form typical of the family Tetragnathidae. Females reach a body length of approximately 11 mm. In both sexes, the median eyes are not spaced more widely from each other than the lateral eyes are from each other, and both eye rows are nearly parallel. In females, the chelicerae bear a large tooth on their apical-retroventral surface, and the epigyne has a genital lobe that is distinctly longer than wide, sometimes bearing a posterior notch; the vulva contains a single pair of receptacula seminis in addition to an unpaired medial structure. In males, the paracymbium of the palp bears a distinct notch at its apex.

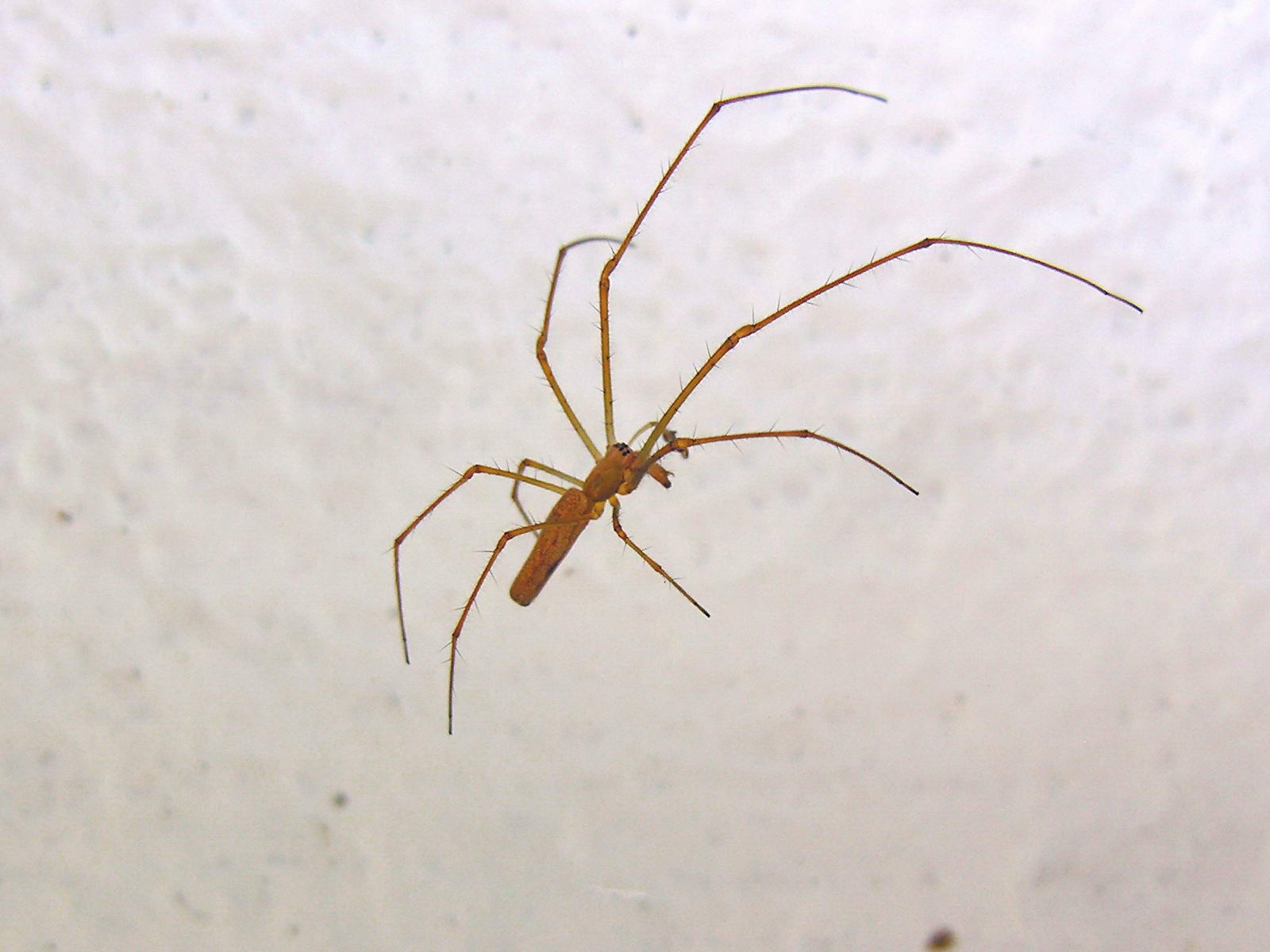

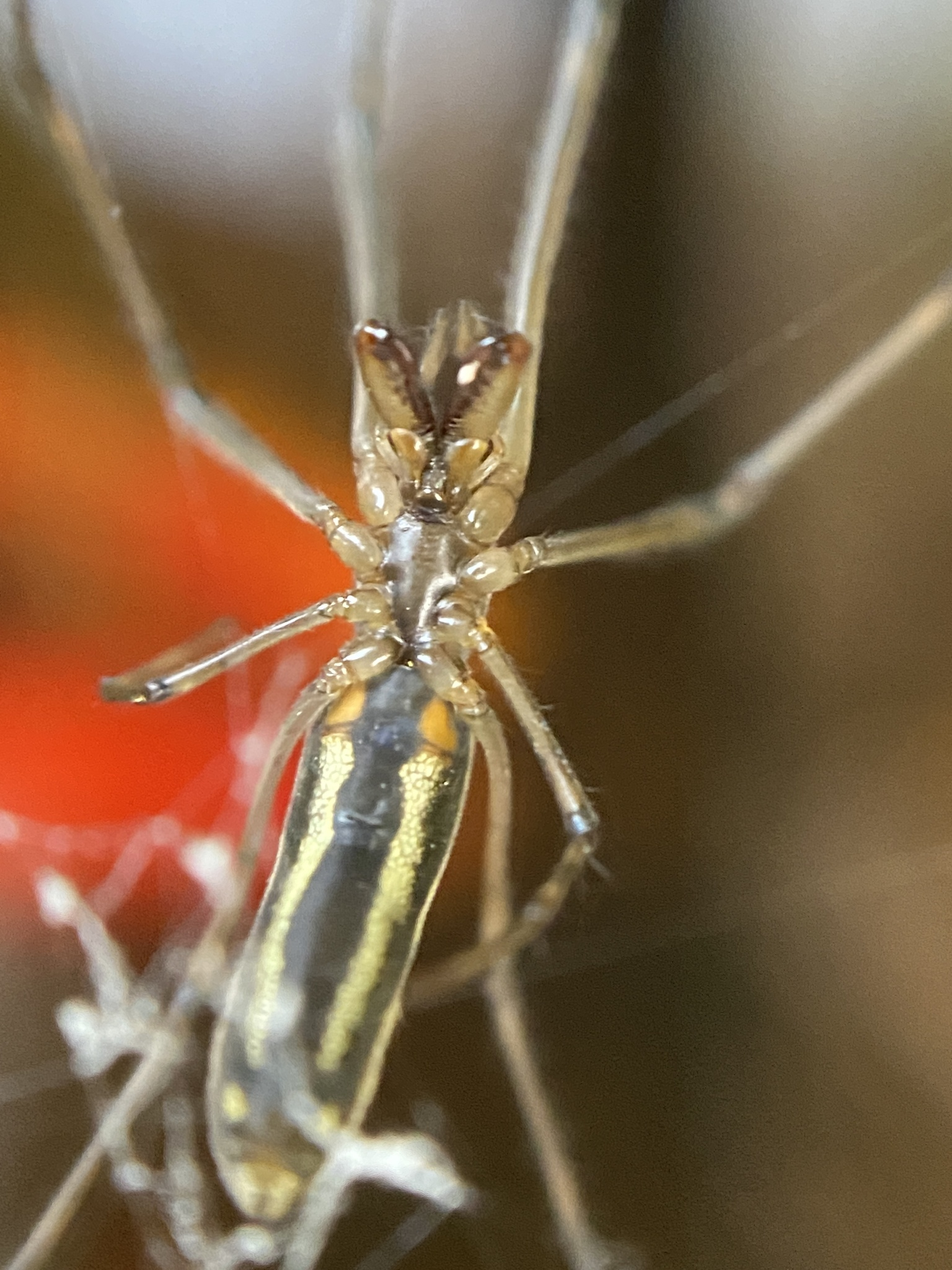

== Conservation ==
Tetragnatha nitens is listed as Least Concern due to its wide geographical range spanning multiple continents. The species has been sampled from protected areas such as Roodeplaatdam Nature Reserve and Addo Elephant National Park in South Africa. There are no significant threats to the species.

== Etymology ==
The specific epithet, nitens, describes the spider as "shining" (brillante).

== Taxonomy ==
The species was revised by Okuma and Dippenaar-Schoeman in 1988. It was originally described from Egypt.
