= Atelidea spinosa =

Scientific classification
- Kingdom: Animalia
- Phylum: Arthropoda
- Subphylum: Chelicerata
- Class: Arachnida
- Order: Araneae
- Infraorder: Araneomorphae
- Family: Tetragnathidae
- Genus: Atelidea
- Species: A. spinosa

Binomial name
- Atelidea spinosa Simon, 1895

Species of spider

Atelidea spinosa is a species of spider in the long-jawed orb weaver family Tetragnathidae, found in Sri Lanka.
