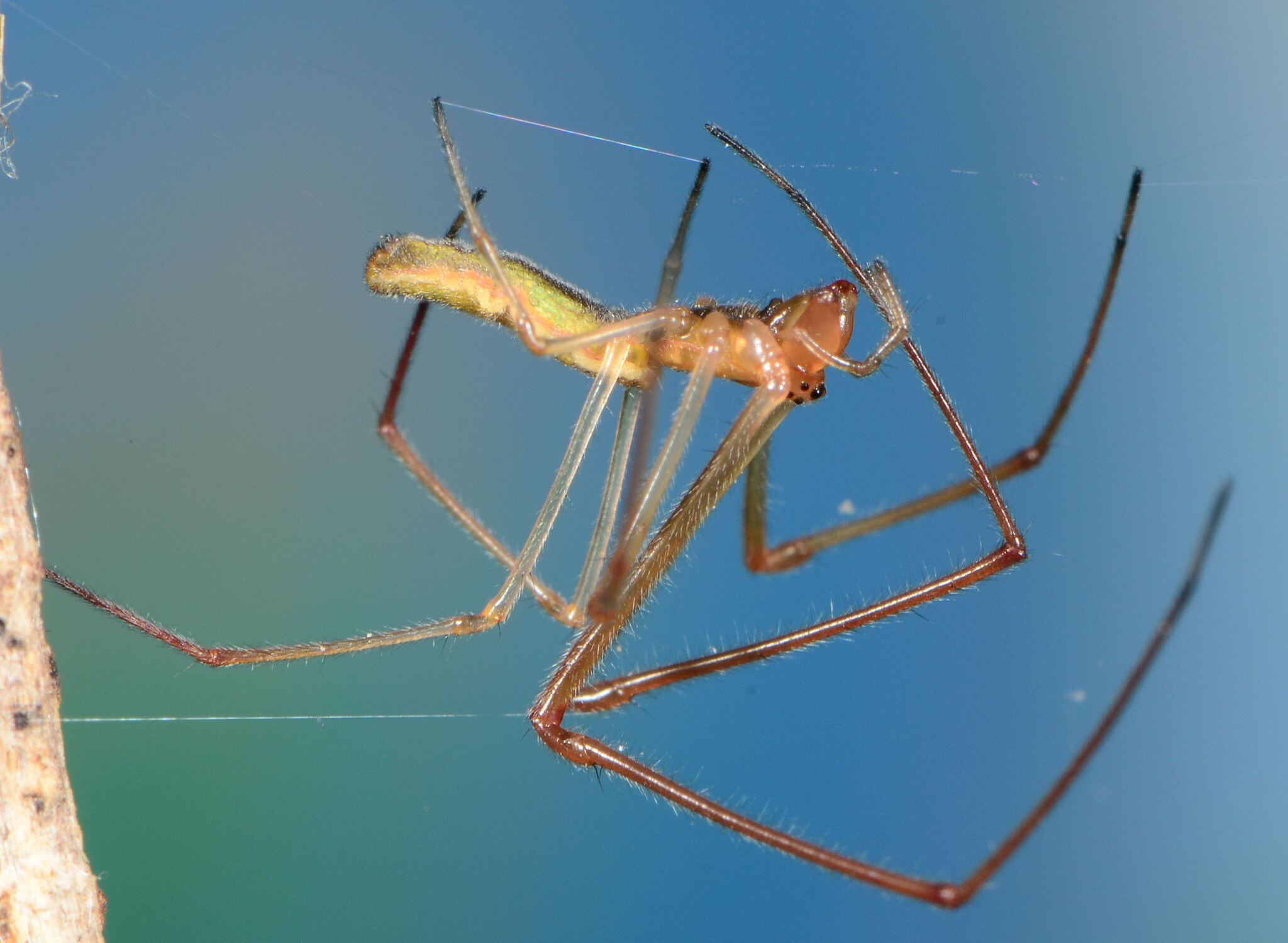
- female
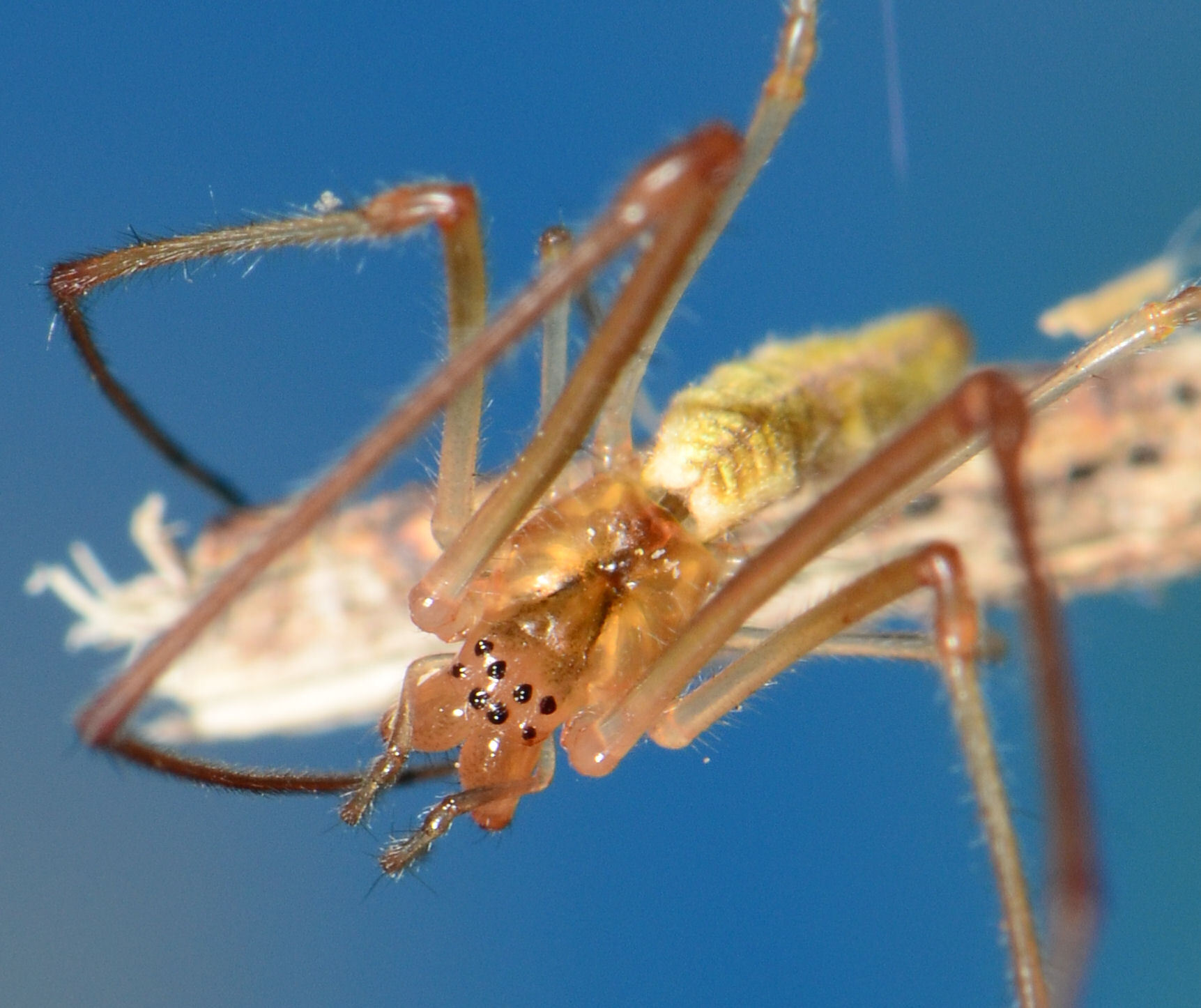
- female

Scientific classification
- Kingdom: Animalia
- Phylum: Arthropoda
- Subphylum: Chelicerata
- Class: Arachnida
- Order: Araneae
- Infraorder: Araneomorphae
- Family: Tetragnathidae
- Genus: Tetragnatha
- Species: T. jaculator

Binomial name
- Tetragnatha jaculator Tullgren, 1910

Synonyms
- Tetragnatha argyroides Mello-Leitão, 1945; Tetragnatha lewisi Chickering, 1962

= Tetragnatha jaculator =

Jaculator Long-jawed Spider

Species of spider

Tetragnatha jaculator is a species of spider in the family Tetragnathidae. It has a wide distribution across Africa, Asia, and has been introduced to the Americas, and is commonly known as Jaculator long-jawed spider.

== Distribution ==
Tetragnatha jaculator occurs from Africa to China, India, and New Guinea, and has been introduced to the Caribbean and South America.

In Africa, it is known from Tanzania, Ivory Coast, Namibia, Uganda, Malawi, and South Africa.

Within South Africa, the species has been recorded from four provinces.

== Habitat and ecology ==
These spiders construct orb webs in grass. The species has been sampled from the Grassland and Savanna biomes at altitudes ranging from 531 to 1722 m. It has also been collected from cotton and maize fields.

== Description ==
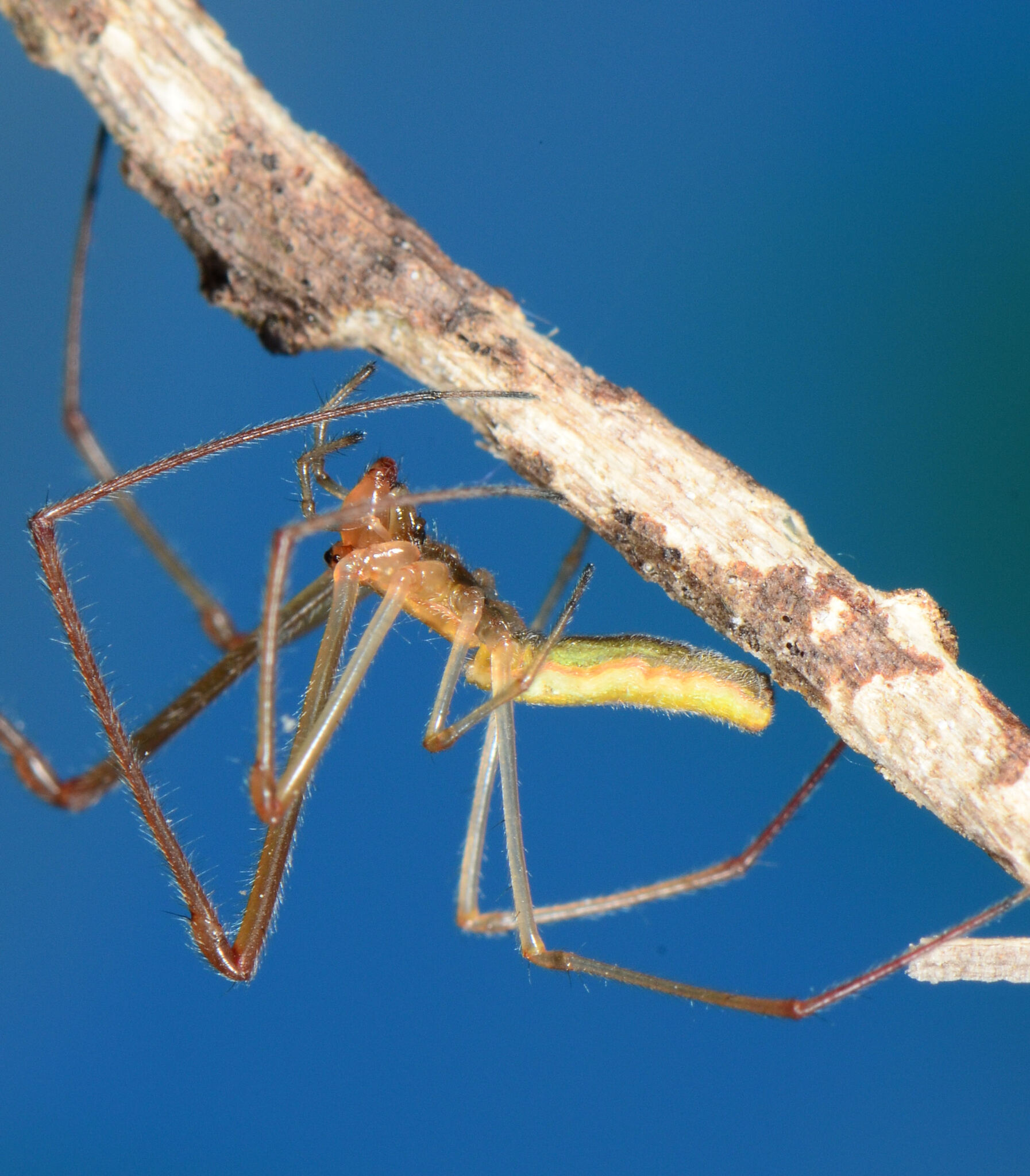
female

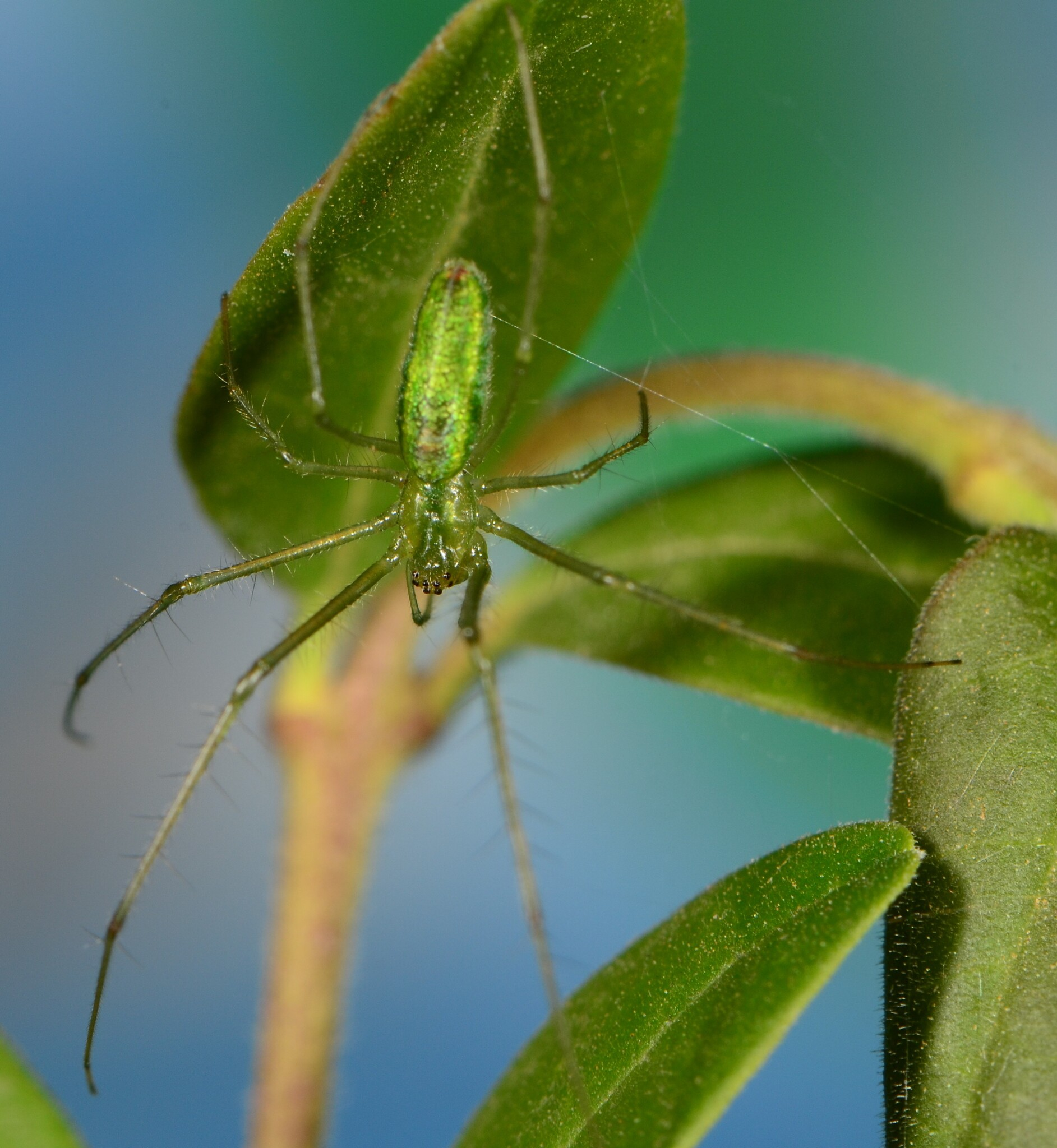
juvenile female

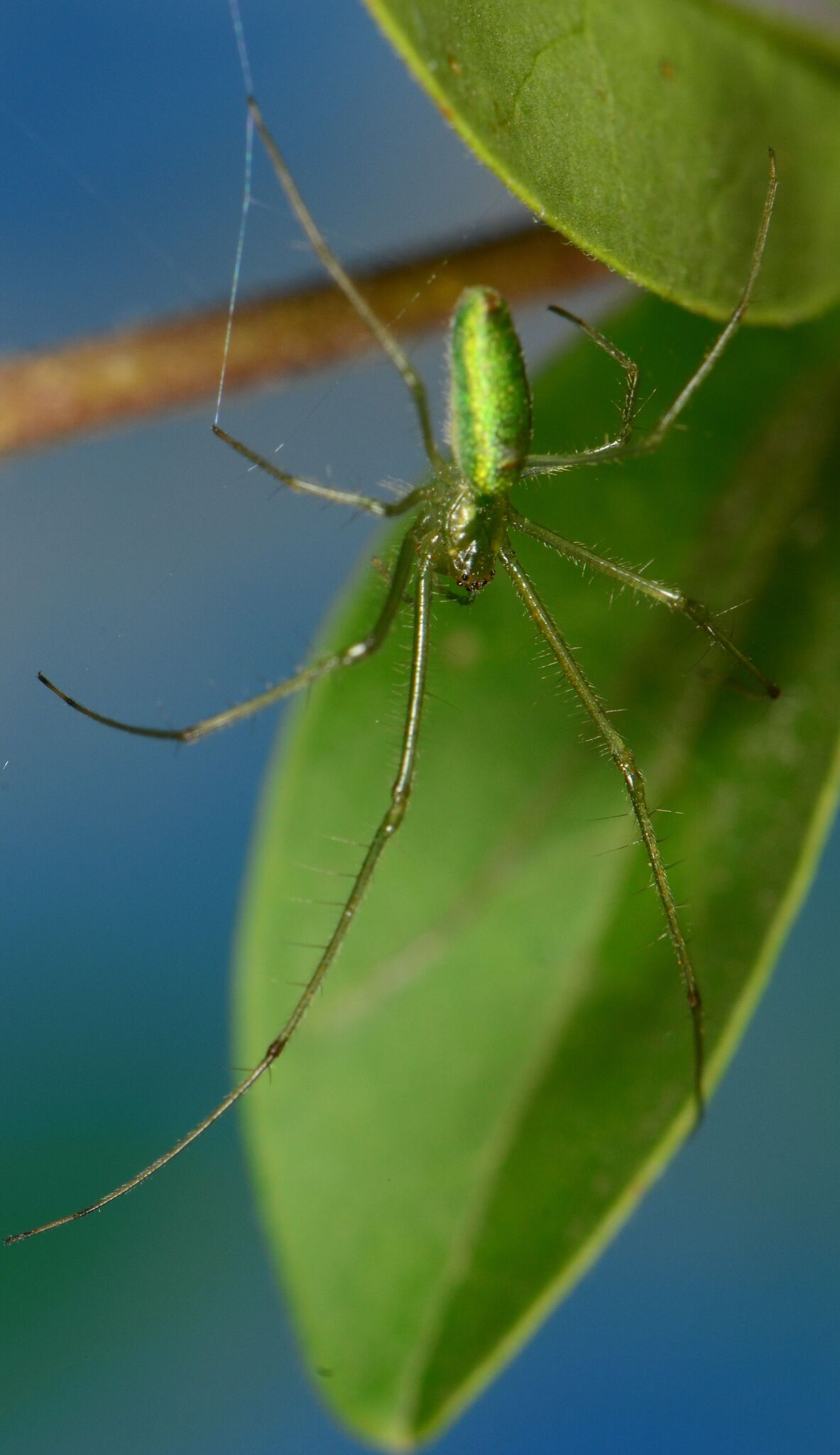
juvenile female

== Conservation ==
Tetragnatha jaculator is listed as Least Concern due to its wide geographical range spanning multiple continents. The species is protected in three protected areas in South Africa. There are no significant threats to the species.

== Taxonomy ==
The species was reviewed by Okuma and Dippenaar-Schoeman in 1988. In 2021, Castanheira and Baptista synonymized T. argyroides and T. lewisi with T. jaculator. Both sexes are known and have been described.
