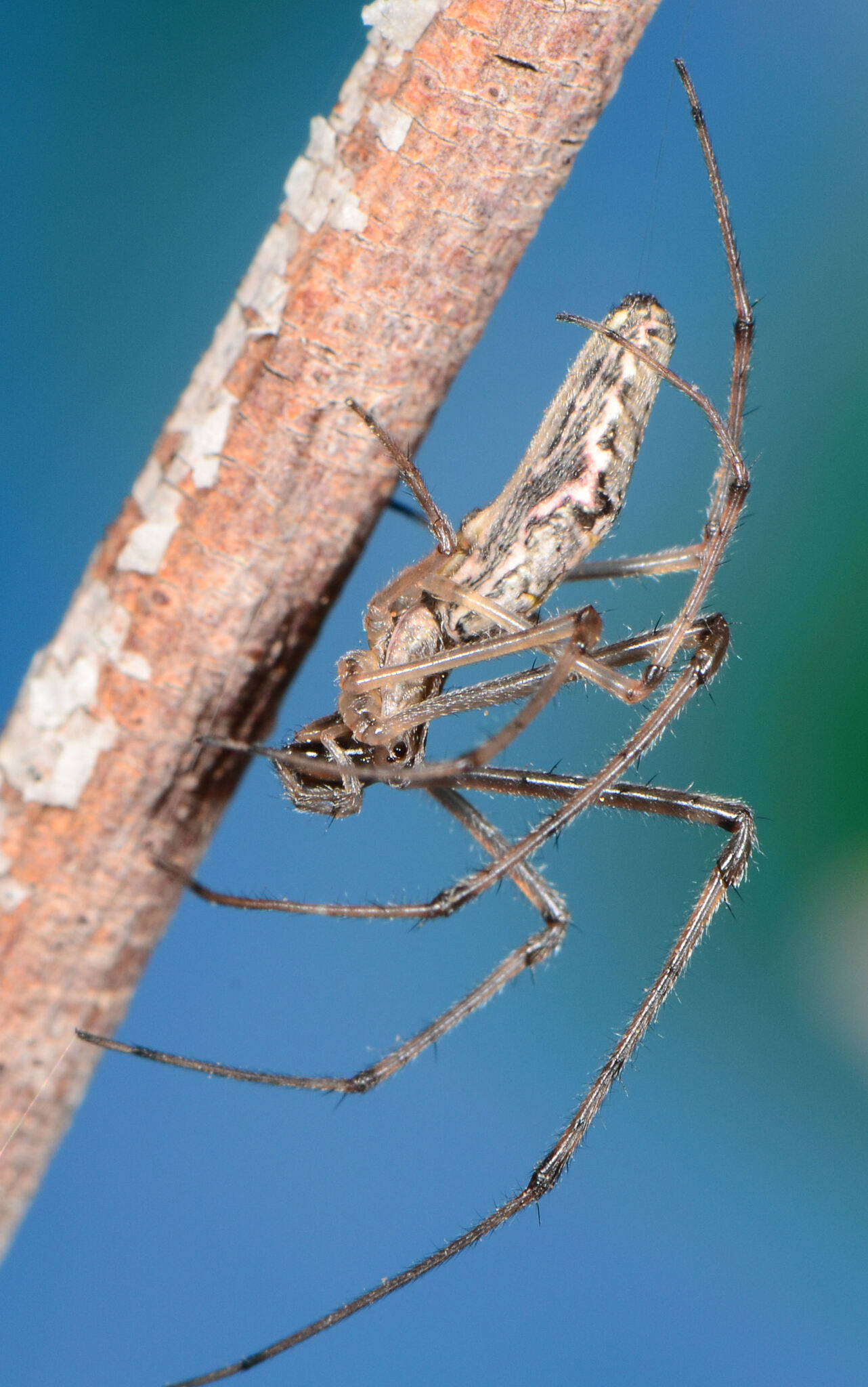
- female
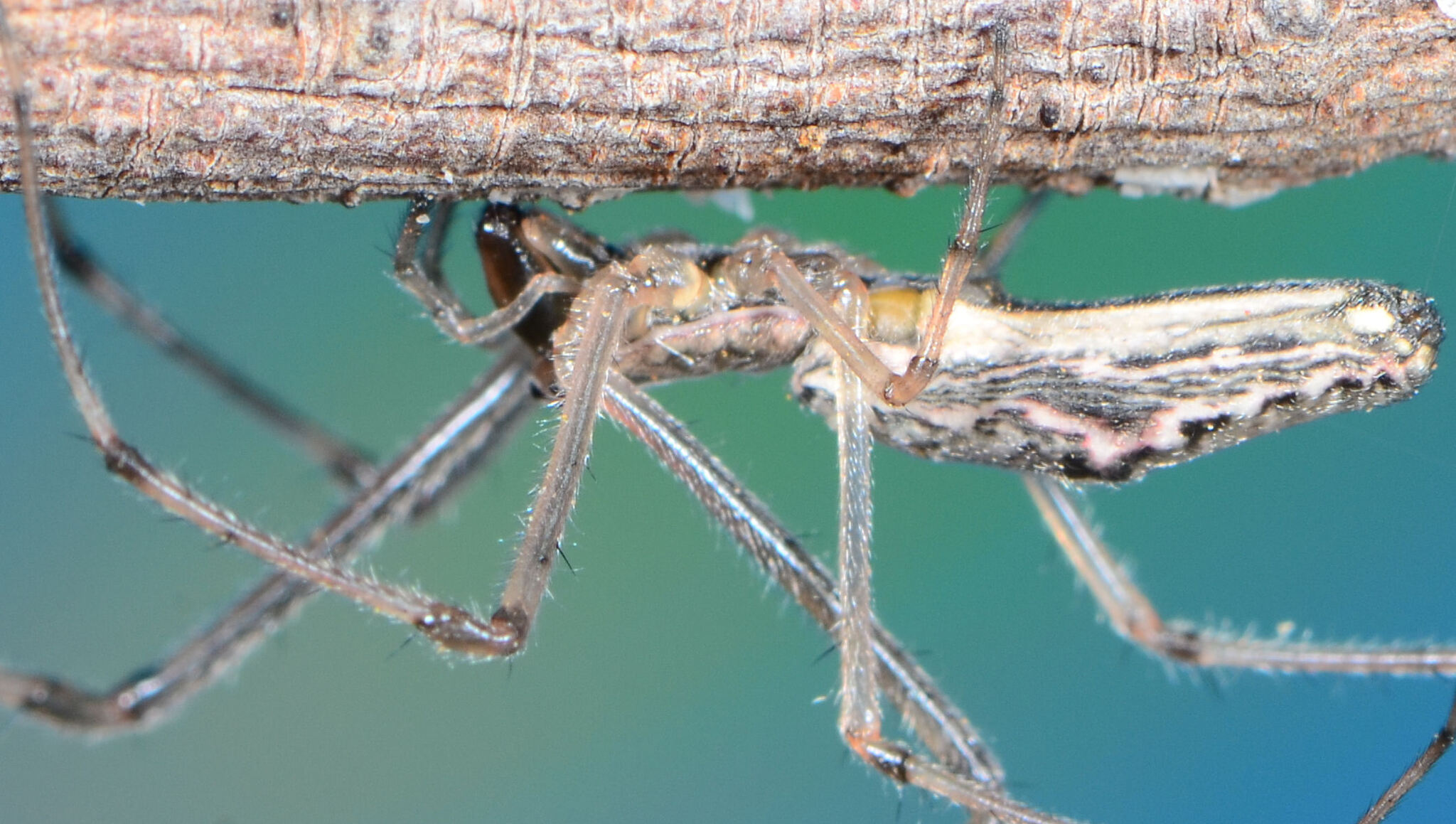
- female

Scientific classification
- Kingdom: Animalia
- Phylum: Arthropoda
- Subphylum: Chelicerata
- Class: Arachnida
- Order: Araneae
- Infraorder: Araneomorphae
- Family: Tetragnathidae
- Genus: Tetragnatha
- Species: T. demissa

Binomial name
- Tetragnatha demissa L. Koch, 1872

Synonyms
- Tetragnatha protensa Keyserling, 1887; Tetragnatha foliifera Simon, 1898; Tetragnatha quadridens Dondale, 1966; Tetragnatha marginata Saaristo, 1978; Tetragnatha grenda Roberts, 1983

= Tetragnatha demissa =

Demissa Long-jawed Spider

Species of spider

Tetragnatha demissa is a species of spider in the family Tetragnathidae. It is native to Australia and has been introduced to several other regions, and is commonly known as Demissa long-jawed spider.

== Distribution ==
Tetragnatha demissa is native to Australia and has been introduced to Cyprus, Tanzania, South Africa, Seychelles, and Tonga.

In South Africa, the species is known from seven provinces and occurs in more than ten protected areas.

== Habitat and ecology ==
These spiders construct orb webs that are short-lived, being taken down and digested daily. The horizontal webs are usually built in vegetation close to or over water. During late afternoons, the webs can become very thick and extensive. The spider hangs under the central hub of the web with the long front legs stretched forward. During periods of inactivity, the spider sits on plant stems with the body and legs pressed to the substrate.

If these spiders fall in the water, they are able to run on the surface. The species has been sampled from the Grassland, Nama Karoo, Savanna, and Thicket biomes, at altitudes ranging from 20 to 1649 m. The species can sometimes be present in high numbers in an area.

== Conservation ==
Tetragnatha demissa is listed as Least Concern due to its wide geographical range. The species is protected in more than thirteen protected areas in South Africa. There are no significant threats to the species.

== Taxonomy ==
The species was reviewed by Okuma and Dippenaar-Schoeman in 1988. Both sexes are known and have been described.
