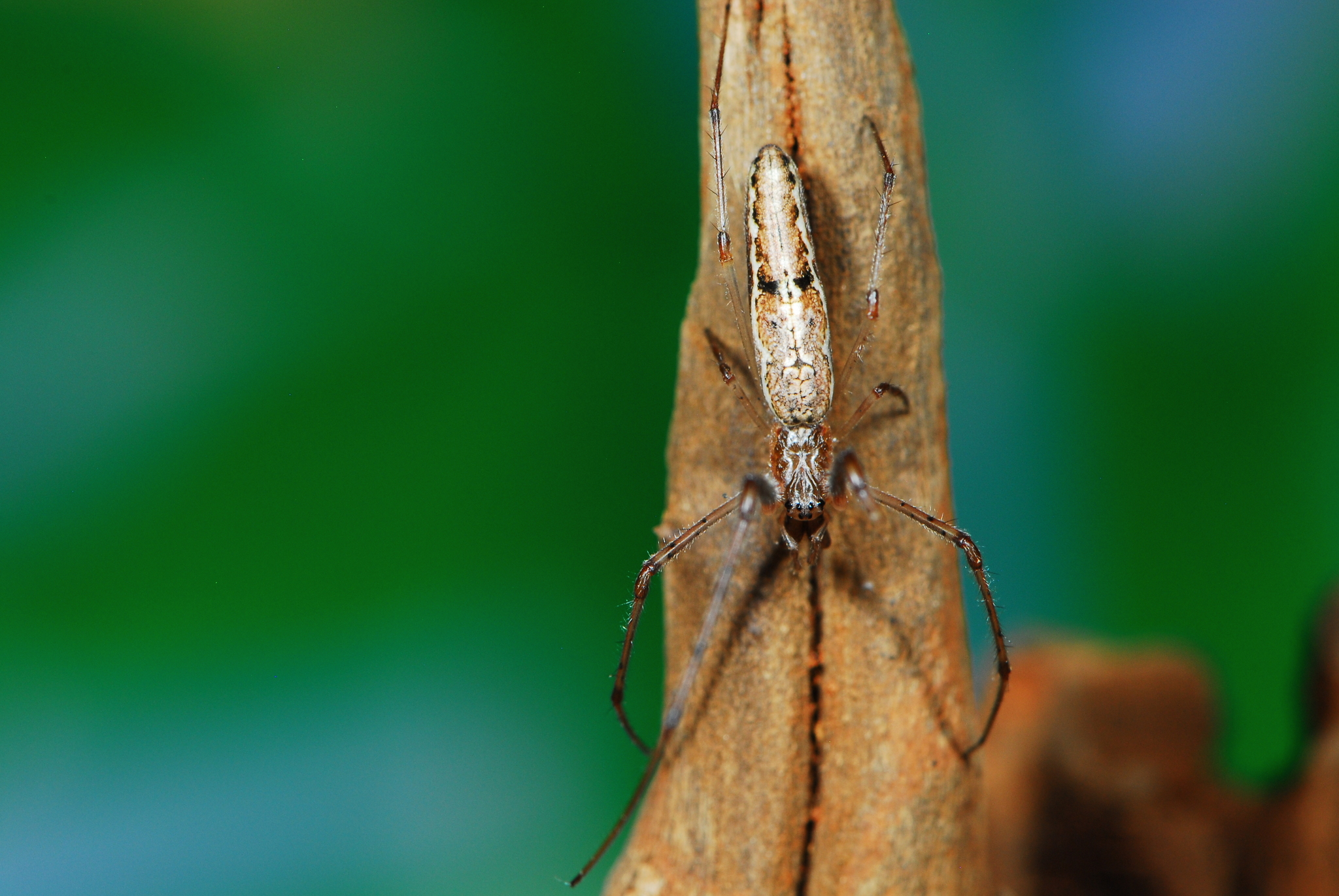
- female
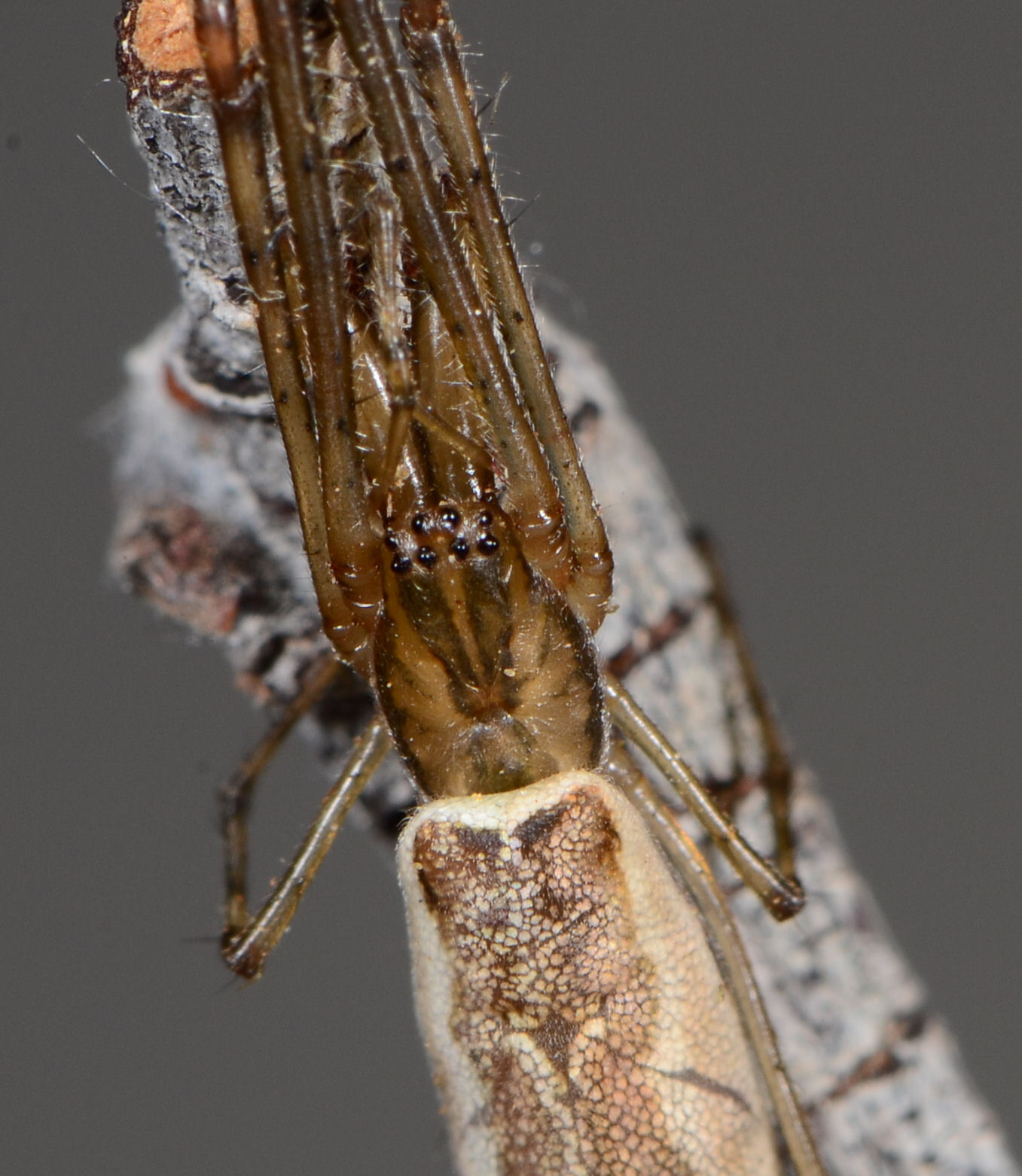
- male

Scientific classification
- Kingdom: Animalia
- Phylum: Arthropoda
- Subphylum: Chelicerata
- Class: Arachnida
- Order: Araneae
- Infraorder: Araneomorphae
- Family: Tetragnathidae
- Genus: Tetragnatha
- Species: T. bogotensis

Binomial name
- Tetragnatha bogotensis Keyserling, 1865

Synonyms
- T. andina Taczanowski, 1878; T. boydi O. Pickard-Cambridge, 1898; T. peninsulana Banks, 1898; T. praedator Tullgren, 1910; T. eremita Chamberlin, 1924; T. nitens Lawrence, 1927; T. bemalcuei Mello-Leitão, 1939; T. ramboi Mello-Leitão, 1943; T. haitiensis Bryant, 1945; T. mandibulata Saaristo, 1978; T. chauliodus Basu & Raychaudhuri, 2016

= Tetragnatha bogotensis =

Bogotensis Long-jawed Spider

Species of spider

Tetragnatha bogotensis is a species of spider in the family Tetragnathidae. It has a widespread distribution across the Americas, parts of Europe, Africa, and Asia, and is commonly known as Bogotensis long-jawed spider.

== Distribution ==
Tetragnatha bogotensis has a broad global distribution, occurring from Mexico to Paraguay, the Caribbean, and has been introduced to Spain, Italy (Sardinia), Africa, Seychelles, Yemen, India, Nepal, Bangladesh, and China.

In Africa, it is known from Namibia, Lesotho, Botswana, Mozambique, Tanzania, and South Africa. Within South Africa, the species is recorded from all nine provinces at altitudes ranging from 4 to 1800 m.

== Habitat and ecology ==
This spider constructs orb webs that are short-lived, being taken down and digested daily. The webs are usually horizontally inclined over water surfaces or in grass near water. The spider hangs over the central hub of the web with the long front legs stretched forward. When not in the web, individuals rest on vegetation.

The species has been sampled from the Grassland, Indian Ocean Coastal Belt, Nama Karoo, Savanna, and Thicket biomes.

== Description ==
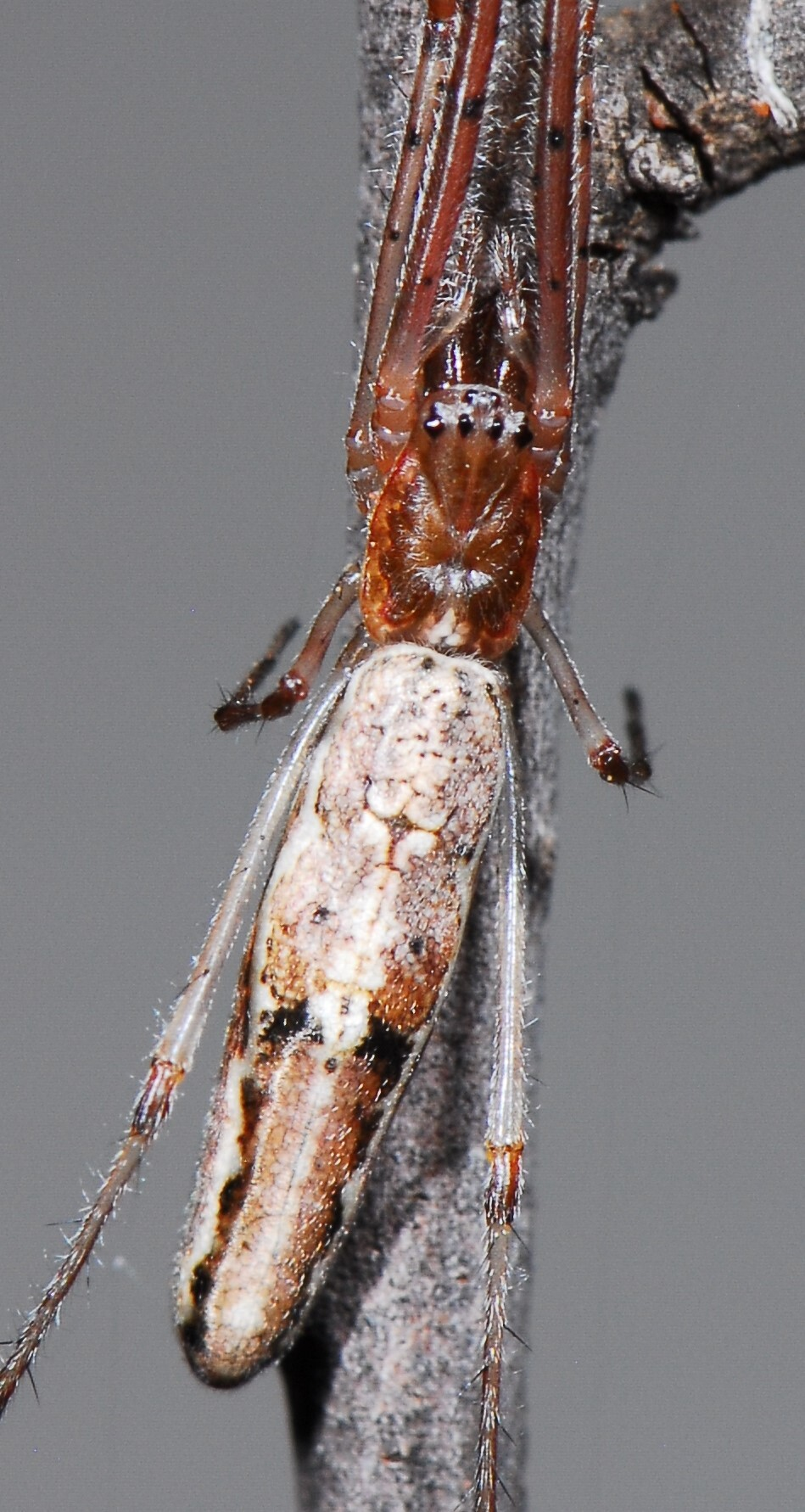
female

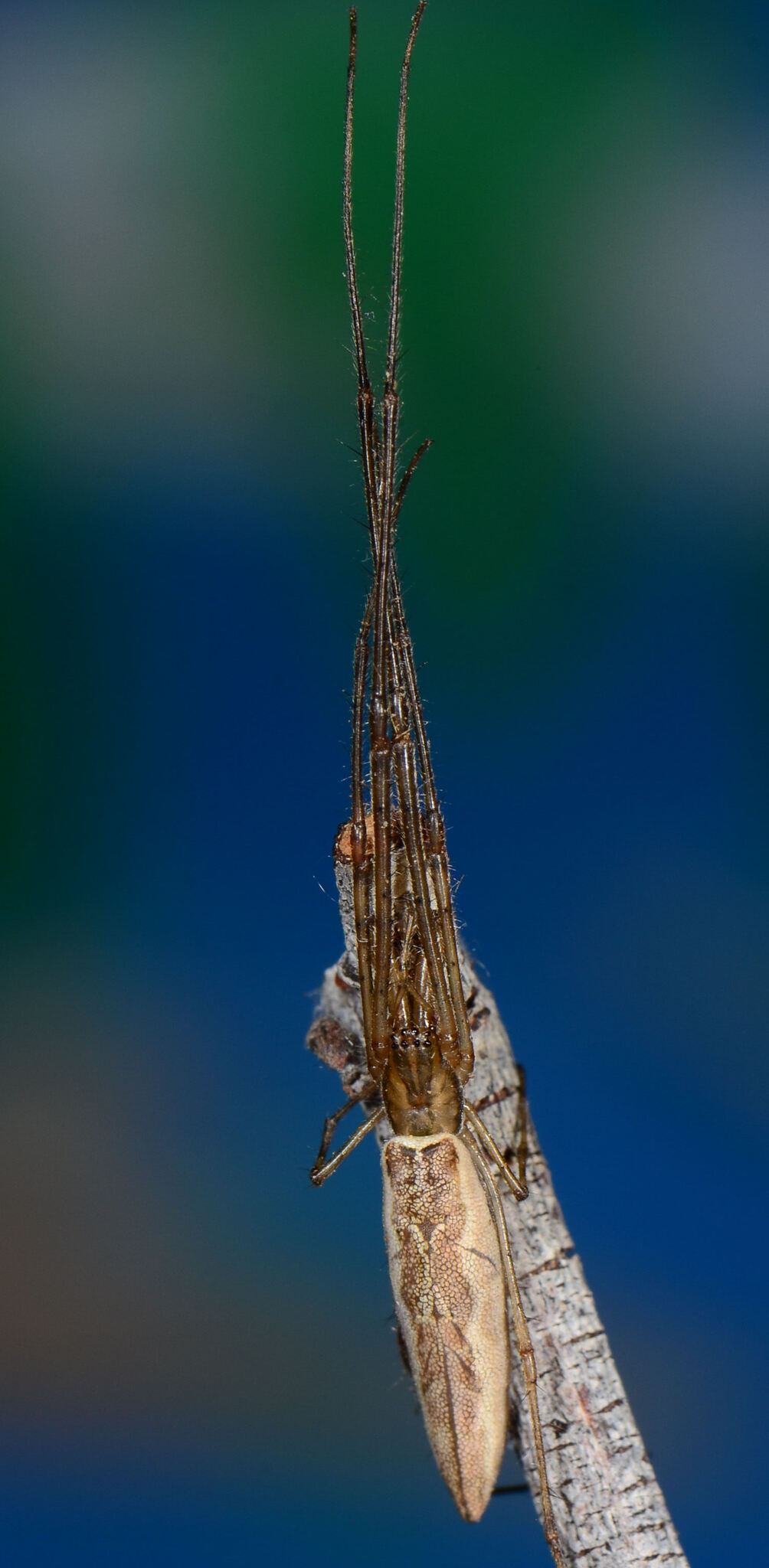
male

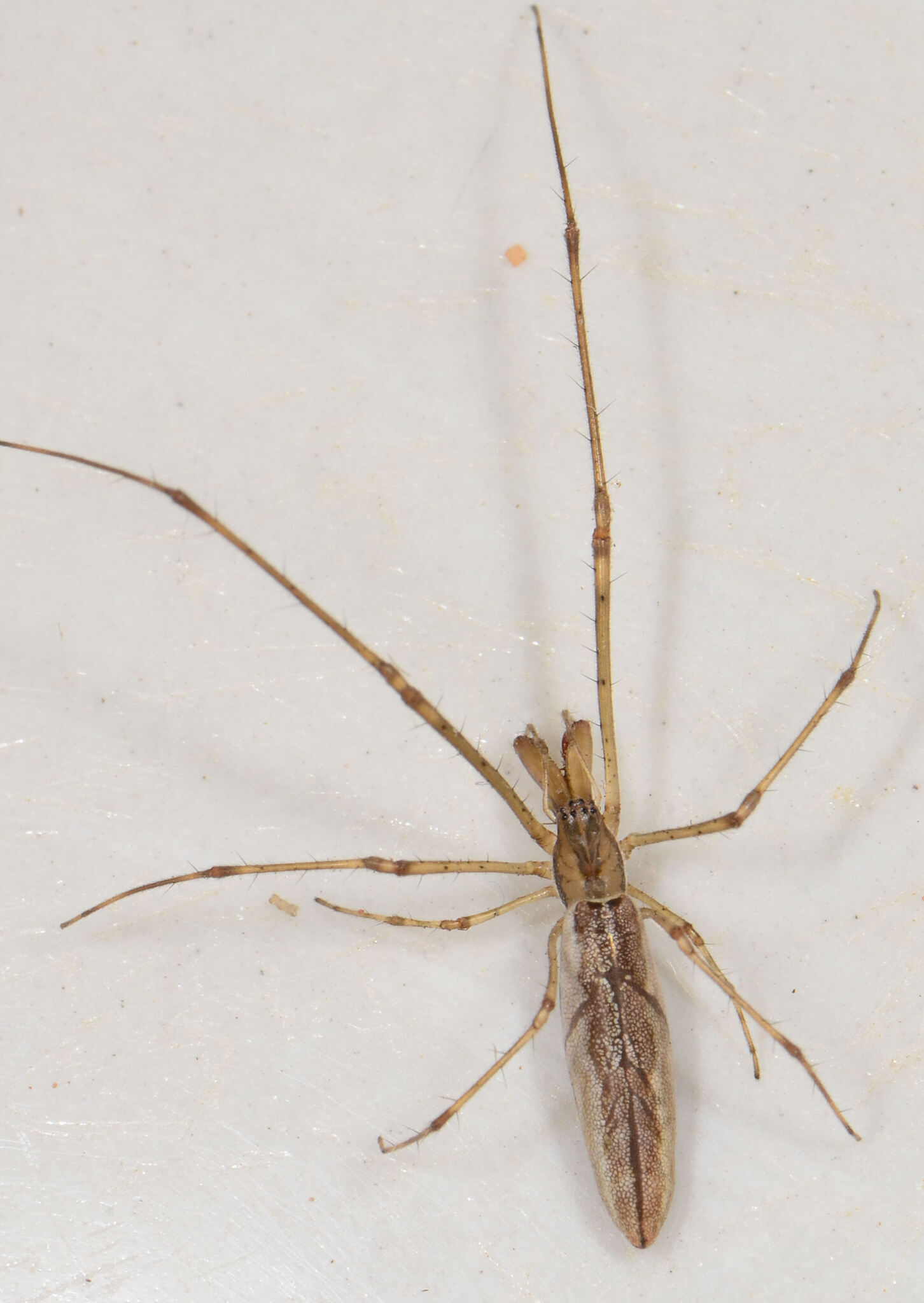
male

== Conservation ==
Tetragnatha bogotensis is listed as Least Concern due to its wide geographical range spanning multiple continents. The species receives protection in more than ten protected areas in South Africa. There are no significant threats to the species.

== Taxonomy ==
The species was reviewed by Okuma and Dippenaar-Schoeman in 1988 as T. boydi. In 2019, Castanheira and colleagues synonymized T. boydi with T. bogotensis, along with several other species names.
