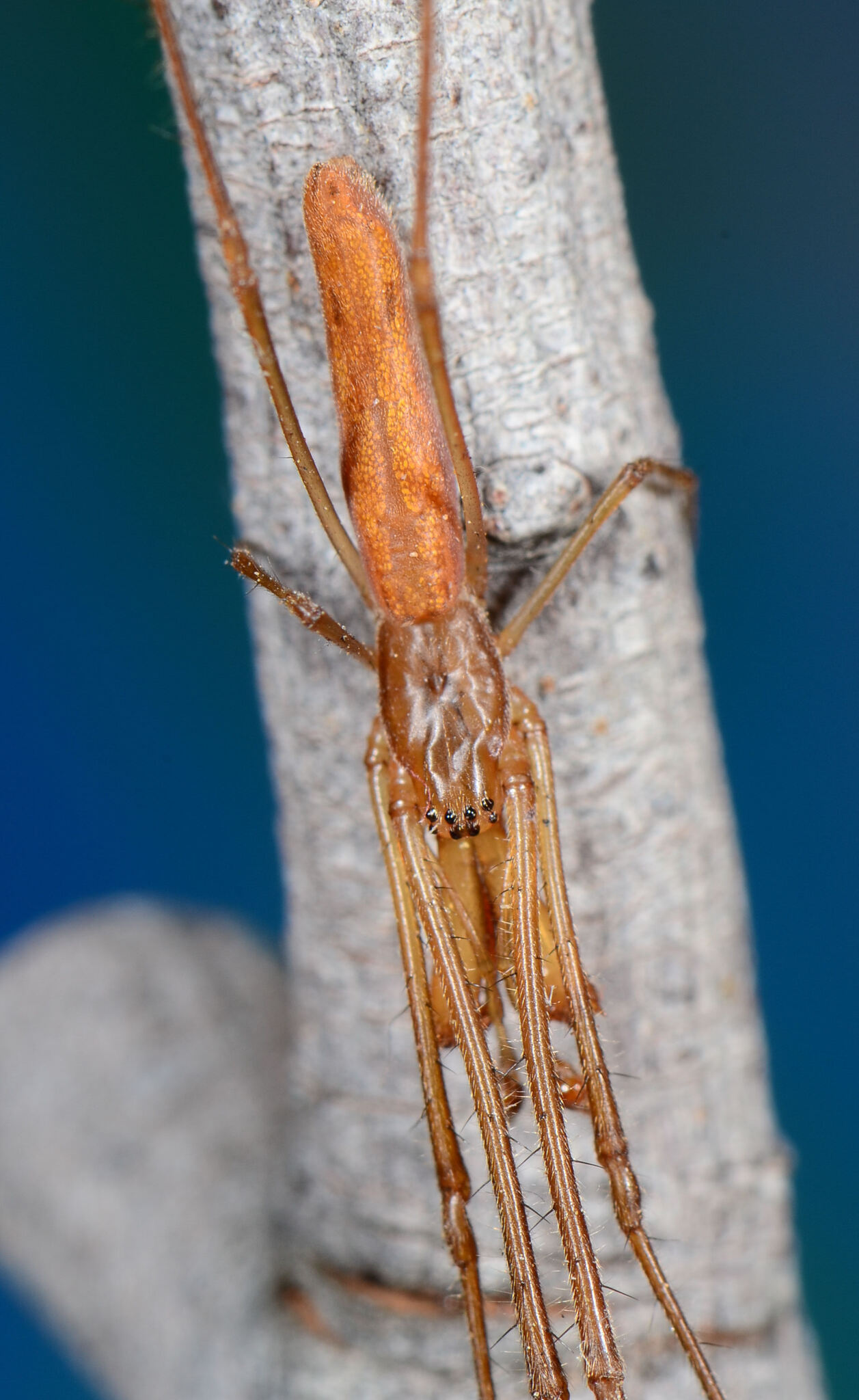

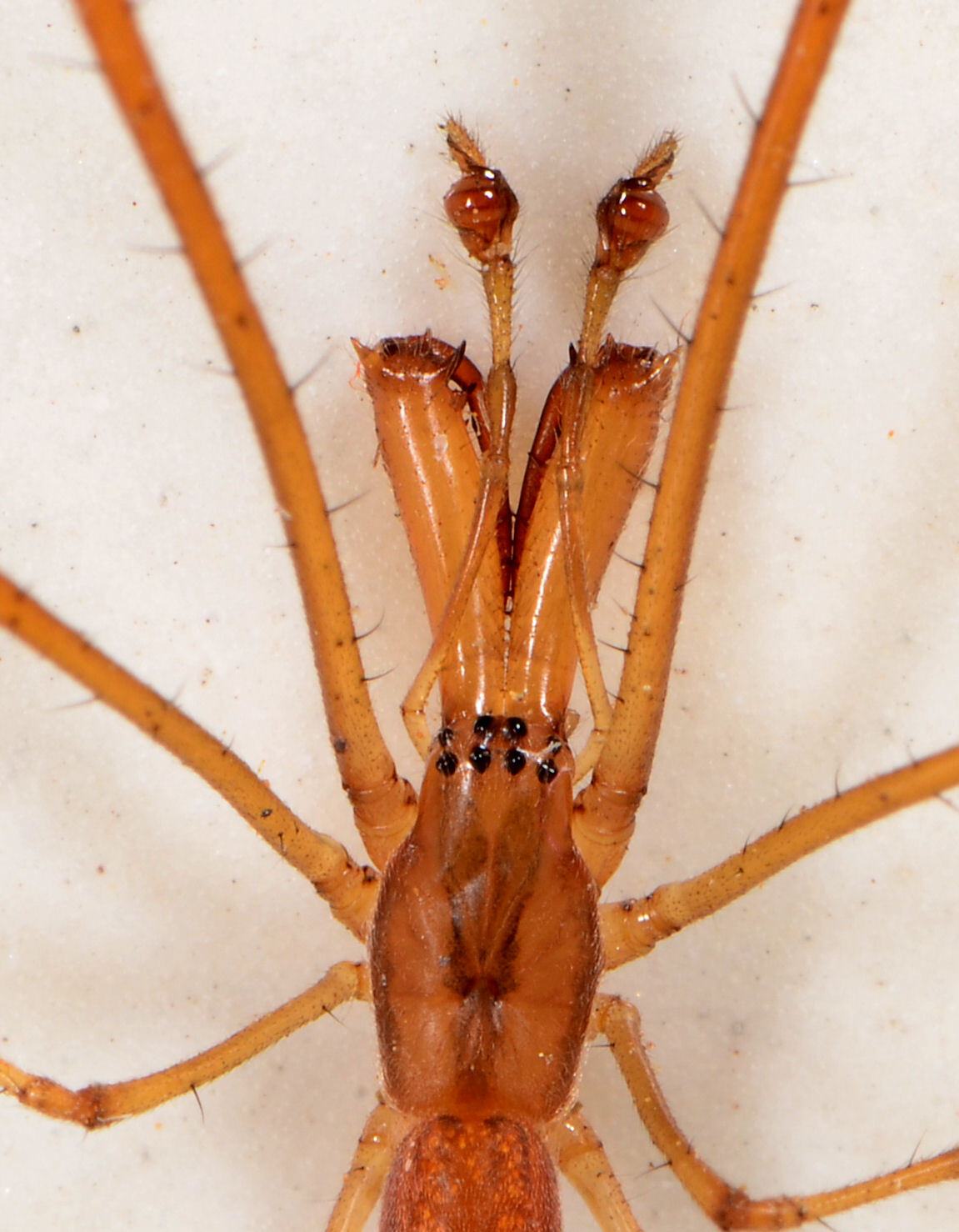

Scientific classification
- Kingdom: Animalia
- Phylum: Arthropoda
- Subphylum: Chelicerata
- Class: Arachnida
- Order: Araneae
- Infraorder: Araneomorphae
- Family: Tetragnathidae
- Genus: Tetragnatha
- Species: T. unicornis

Binomial name
- Tetragnatha unicornis Tullgren, 1910

= Tetragnatha unicornis =

Unicornis Long-jawed Spider

Species of spider

Tetragnatha unicornis is a species of spider in the family Tetragnathidae. It is found in several African countries and is commonly known as Unicornis long-jawed spider.

== Distribution ==
Tetragnatha unicornis is known from Tanzania, Botswana, and South Africa. In South Africa, the species has been recorded from two provinces and is protected in three protected areas, at altitudes ranging from 47 to 51 m.

== Habitat and ecology ==
These orb web dwellers construct their webs in grass. The species has been sampled from the Indian Ocean Coastal Belt and Savanna biomes.

== Description ==
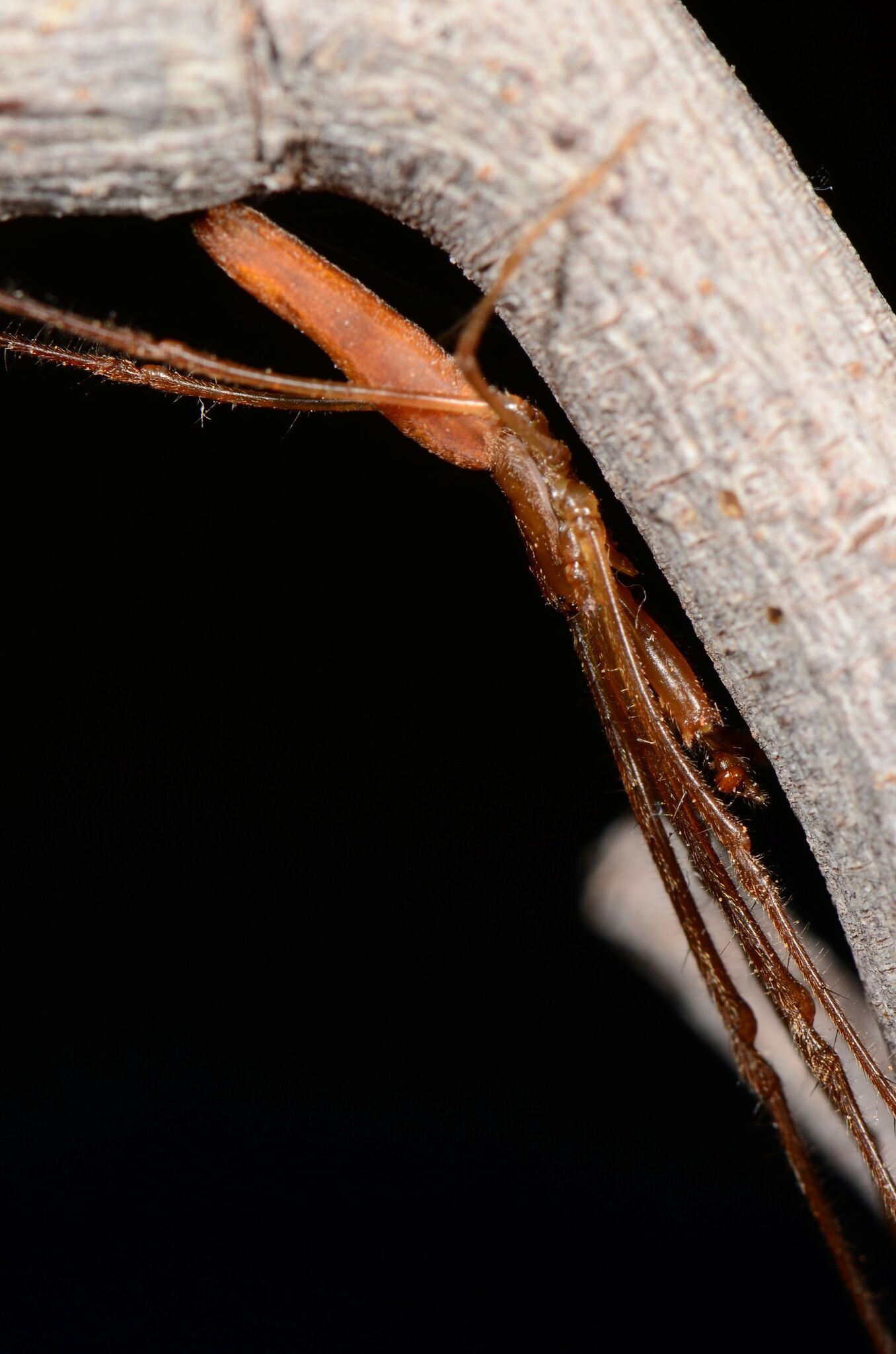
male

== Conservation ==
Tetragnatha unicornis is listed as Least Concern due to its wide geographical range across three African countries. The species is protected in Ndumo Game Reserve in South Africa. There are no significant threats to the species.

== Taxonomy ==
The species was originally described from Usambara, Tanzania, by Tullgren in 1910. It was reviewed by Okuma and Dippenaar-Schoeman in 1988. Both sexes are known.
