= Homalometa =

Homalometa Temporal range: Neogene– Present

Scientific classification
- Kingdom: Animalia
- Phylum: Arthropoda
- Subphylum: Chelicerata
- Class: Arachnida
- Order: Araneae
- Infraorder: Araneomorphae
- Family: Tetragnathidae
- Genus: Homalometa; Simon, 1898

Type species
- H. nigritarsis Simon, 1898

Species
- H. chiriqui Levi, 1986 – Costa Rica, Panama; H. nigritarsis Simon, 1898 – Cuba, Lesser Antilles, Mexico, Panama; H. nossa Levi, 1986 – Brazil

Genus of spiders

Homalometa is a genus of long-jawed orb-weavers that was first described by Eugène Louis Simon in 1898. As of October 2019 it contains three species, found in the Caribbean, Panama, Costa Rica, Brazil, and Mexico: H. chiriqui, H. nigritarsis, and H. nossa.
