= Cyrtognatha =

Cyrtognatha Temporal range: Neogene– Present

Scientific classification
- Kingdom: Animalia
- Phylum: Arthropoda
- Subphylum: Chelicerata
- Class: Arachnida
- Order: Araneae
- Infraorder: Araneomorphae
- Family: Tetragnathidae
- Genus: Cyrtognatha; Keyserling, 1881

Type species
- C. nigrovittata Keyserling, 1881

Species
- 21, see text

Synonyms
- Agriognatha O. Pickard-Cambridge, 1896

Genus of spiders

Cyrtognatha is a genus of long-jawed orb-weavers that was first described by Eugen von Keyserling in 1881. It is a senior synonym of Agriognatha. Species of this genus are found in The Americas.

== Species ==
As of October 2019 it contains twenty-one species, found in the Caribbean, South America, Guatemala, Costa Rica, Mexico, and Panama:

- Cyrtognatha atopica Dimitrov & Hormiga, 2009 – Argentina
- Cyrtognatha bella (O. Pickard-Cambridge, 1896) – Costa Rica
- Cyrtognatha bryantae (Chickering, 1956) – Jamaica
- Cyrtognatha catia Dimitrov & Hormiga, 2009 – Colombia
- Cyrtognatha eberhardi Dimitrov & Hormiga, 2009 – Brazil
- Cyrtognatha espanola (Bryant, 1945) – Hispaniola
- Cyrtognatha insolita (Chickering, 1956) – Costa Rica, Panama
- Cyrtognatha lepida (O. Pickard-Cambridge, 1889) – Panama
- Cyrtognatha leviorum Dimitrov & Hormiga, 2009 – Panama
- Cyrtognatha morona Dimitrov & Hormiga, 2009 – Ecuador
- Cyrtognatha nigrovittata Keyserling, 1881 (type) – Peru
- Cyrtognatha orphana Dimitrov & Hormiga, 2009 – Brazil
- Cyrtognatha pachygnathoides (O. Pickard-Cambridge, 1894) – Costa Rica, Panama
- Cyrtognatha paradoxa Dimitrov & Hormiga, 2009 – Mexico
- Cyrtognatha pathetica Dimitrov & Hormiga, 2009 – Guatemala
- Cyrtognatha petila Dimitrov & Hormiga, 2009 – Mexico
- Cyrtognatha quichua Dimitrov & Hormiga, 2009 – Ecuador
- Cyrtognatha rucilla (Bryant, 1945) – Hispaniola
- Cyrtognatha serrata Simon, 1898 – Martinique, St. Vincent
- Cyrtognatha simoni (Bryant, 1940) – Cuba
- Cyrtognatha waorani Dimitrov & Hormiga, 2009 – Ecuador

In synonymy:

- C. argyra (Bryant, 1945) = Cyrtognatha rucilla (Bryant, 1945)
