= Mollemeta =

Scientific classification
- Kingdom: Animalia
- Phylum: Arthropoda
- Subphylum: Chelicerata
- Class: Arachnida
- Order: Araneae
- Infraorder: Araneomorphae
- Family: Tetragnathidae
- Genus: Mollemeta; Álvarez-Padilla, 2007
- Species: M. edwardsi

Binomial name
- Mollemeta edwardsi (Simon, 1904)

Synonyms
- Dolichognatha edwardsi (Simon, 1904); Landana edwardsi Simon, 1904

Genus of spiders

Mollemeta is a monotypic genus of long-jawed orb-weavers endemic to Chile. It contains the single species, Mollemeta edwardsi, first described as Landana edwardsi, based on a female found in 1904. The name is a reference to "Molle", the Mapudungun word for "tree", because it builds its vertical orb webs on tree trunks. It is in a clade with Allende, Chrysometa, Dolichognatha, Meta, and Metellina due to several autapomorphies, including the unique shapes of the cymbium, conductor, and embolus.

== See also ==
- Allende
- Chrysometa
- Dolichognatha
- Meta
- Metellina
