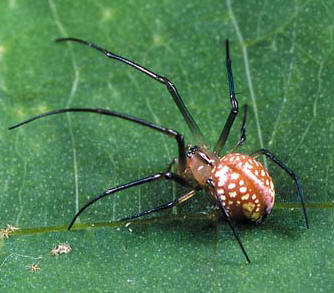
- Okileucauge sasakii female

Scientific classification
- Kingdom: Animalia
- Phylum: Arthropoda
- Subphylum: Chelicerata
- Class: Arachnida
- Order: Araneae
- Infraorder: Araneomorphae
- Family: Tetragnathidae
- Genus: Okileucauge; Tanikawa, 2001

Species
- 9, see text

= Okileucauge =

Genus of spiders

Okileucauge is a genus of East Asian long-jawed orb-weavers that was first described by A. Tanikawa in 2001.

== Species ==
As of November 2019 it contains nine species, found in Japan and China:

- Okileucauge elongatus Zhao, Peng & Huang, 2012 – China
- Okileucauge geminuscavum Chen & Zhu, 2009 – China
- Okileucauge gongshan Zhao, Peng & Huang, 2012 – China
- Okileucauge hainan Zhu, Song & Zhang, 2003 – China
- Okileucauge nigricauda Zhu, Song & Zhang, 2003 – China
- Okileucauge sasakii Tanikawa, 2001 – Japan
- Okileucauge tanikawai Zhu, Song & Zhang, 2003 – China
- Okileucauge tibet Zhu, Song & Zhang, 2003 – China
- Okileucauge yinae Zhu, Song & Zhang, 2003 – China
