= Wolongia =

Scientific classification
- Kingdom: Animalia
- Phylum: Arthropoda
- Subphylum: Chelicerata
- Class: Arachnida
- Order: Araneae
- Infraorder: Araneomorphae
- Family: Tetragnathidae
- Genus: Wolongia; Zhu, Kim & Song, 1997

Type species
- W. guoi Zhu, Kim & Song, 1997

Species
- 11, see text

Genus of spiders

Wolongia is a genus of Asian long-jawed orb-weavers that was first described by M. S. Zhu, J. P. Kim & D. X. Song in 1997.

== Species ==
As of November 2019 it contains eleven species, found in East Asia:

- Wolongia bicruris Wan & Peng, 2013 – China
- Wolongia bimacroseta Wan & Peng, 2013 – China
- Wolongia erromera Wan & Peng, 2013 – China
- Wolongia foliacea Wan & Peng, 2013 – China
- Wolongia guoi Zhu, Kim & Song, 1997 (type) – China
- Wolongia mutica Wan & Peng, 2013 – China
- Wolongia odontodes Zhao, Yin & Peng, 2009 – China
- Wolongia papafrancisi Malamel, Nafin, Sankaran & Sebastian, 2018 – India
- Wolongia renaria Wan & Peng, 2013 – China
- Wolongia tetramacroseta Wan & Peng, 2013 – China
- Wolongia wangi Zhu, Kim & Song, 1997 – China
