= Atelidea =

Scientific classification
- Kingdom: Animalia
- Phylum: Arthropoda
- Subphylum: Chelicerata
- Class: Arachnida
- Order: Araneae
- Infraorder: Araneomorphae
- Family: Tetragnathidae
- Genus: Atelidea; Simon, 1895

Type species
- A. spinosa Simon, 1895

Species
- A. nona Sankaran, Malamel, Joseph & Sebastian, 2017 – India; A. spinosa Simon, 1895 – Sri Lanka

Genus of spiders

Atelidea is a genus of Asian long-jawed orb-weavers that was first described by Eugène Louis Simon in 1895. As of October 2019 it contains two species, found in Sri Lanka and India: A. nona and A. spinosa.
