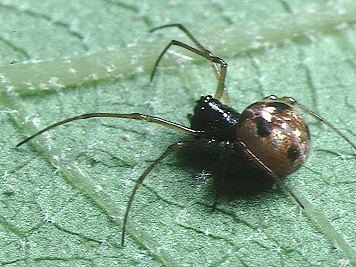
- female D. dentata

Scientific classification
- Kingdom: Animalia
- Phylum: Arthropoda
- Subphylum: Chelicerata
- Class: Arachnida
- Order: Araneae
- Infraorder: Araneomorphae
- Family: Tetragnathidae
- Genus: Dyschiriognatha; Simon, 1893

Type species
- D. bedoti Simon, 1893

Species
- 4, see text

= Dyschiriognatha =

Genus of spiders

Dyschiriognatha is a genus of long-jawed orb-weavers that was first described by Eugène Louis Simon in 1893.

== Species ==
As of October 2019 it contains four species, found in Oceania, Asia, and Brazil:

- Dyschiriognatha bedoti Simon, 1893 (type) – Borneo
- Dyschiriognatha lobata Vellard, 1926 – Brazil
- Dyschiriognatha oceanica Berland, 1929 – Samoa
- Dyschiriognatha upoluensis Marples, 1955 – Samoa, Niue, Cook Is. (Aitutaki), Society Is.
