= Zhinu (spider) =

Scientific classification
- Kingdom: Animalia
- Phylum: Arthropoda
- Subphylum: Chelicerata
- Class: Arachnida
- Order: Araneae
- Infraorder: Araneomorphae
- Family: Tetragnathidae
- Genus: Zhinu; Kallal & Hormiga, 2018

Species
- See text.

Diversity
- 2 species

Genus of spiders

Zhinu is a genus of spiders in the family Tetragnathidae.

== Species ==
As of September 2018, the World Spider Catalog accepted the following extant species:

- Zhinu manmiaoyangi Kallal & Hormiga, 2018 (type species) – Taiwan
- Zhinu reticuloides (Yaginuma, 1958) – Korea, Japan
