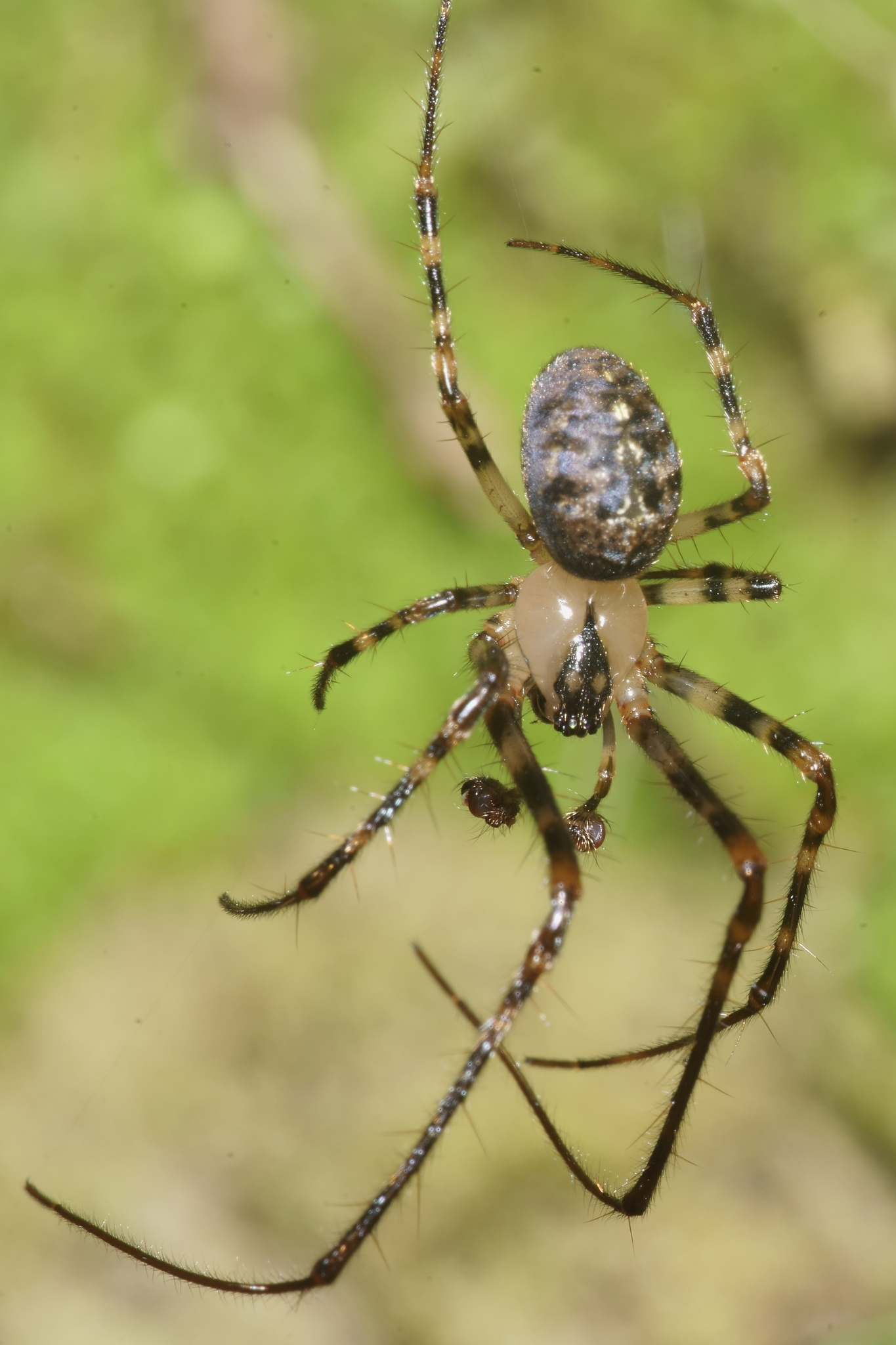

Scientific classification
- Kingdom: Animalia
- Phylum: Arthropoda
- Subphylum: Chelicerata
- Class: Arachnida
- Order: Araneae
- Infraorder: Araneomorphae
- Family: Tetragnathidae
- Genus: Tawhai; Álvarez-Padilla, Kallal & Hormiga, 2020
- Species: T. arborea

Binomial name
- Tawhai arborea (Urquhart, 1891)

= Tawhai =

Genus of spiders

Tawhai is a monotypic genus of Polynesian long-jawed orb-weavers containing the single species Tawhai arborea. The genus was first described by A. Álvarez-Padilla, R. J. Kallal and Gustavo Hormiga in 2020, and it has only been found in New Zealand. The type species, Tawhai arborea, was originally described under the name "Tetragnatha arborea".

== See also ==
- Tetragnatha
- Orsinome
