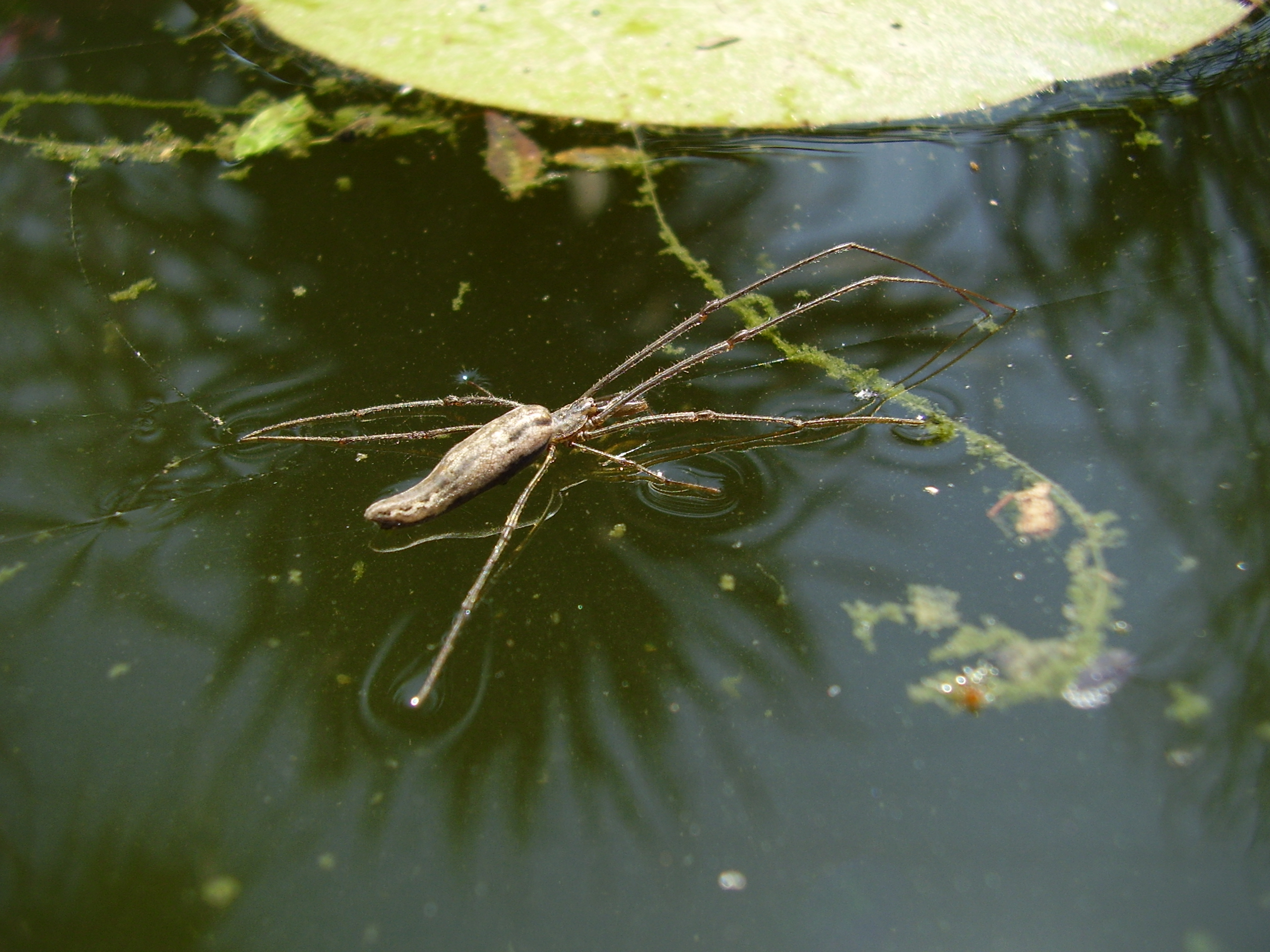

Scientific classification
- Domain: Eukaryota
- Kingdom: Animalia
- Phylum: Arthropoda
- Subphylum: Chelicerata
- Class: Arachnida
- Order: Araneae
- Infraorder: Araneomorphae
- Family: Tetragnathidae
- Genus: Tetragnatha
- Species: T. laboriosa

Binomial name
- Tetragnatha laboriosa Hentz, 1850

= Tetragnatha laboriosa =

Species of spider

Tetragnatha laboriosa, the silver longjawed orbweaver, is a species of long-jawed orb weaver in the spider family Tetragnathidae. It is found in North and Central America. T. laboriosa goes through nine instars, including its adult stage. The spiders are predominantly crepuscular, with nocturnal mating habits.

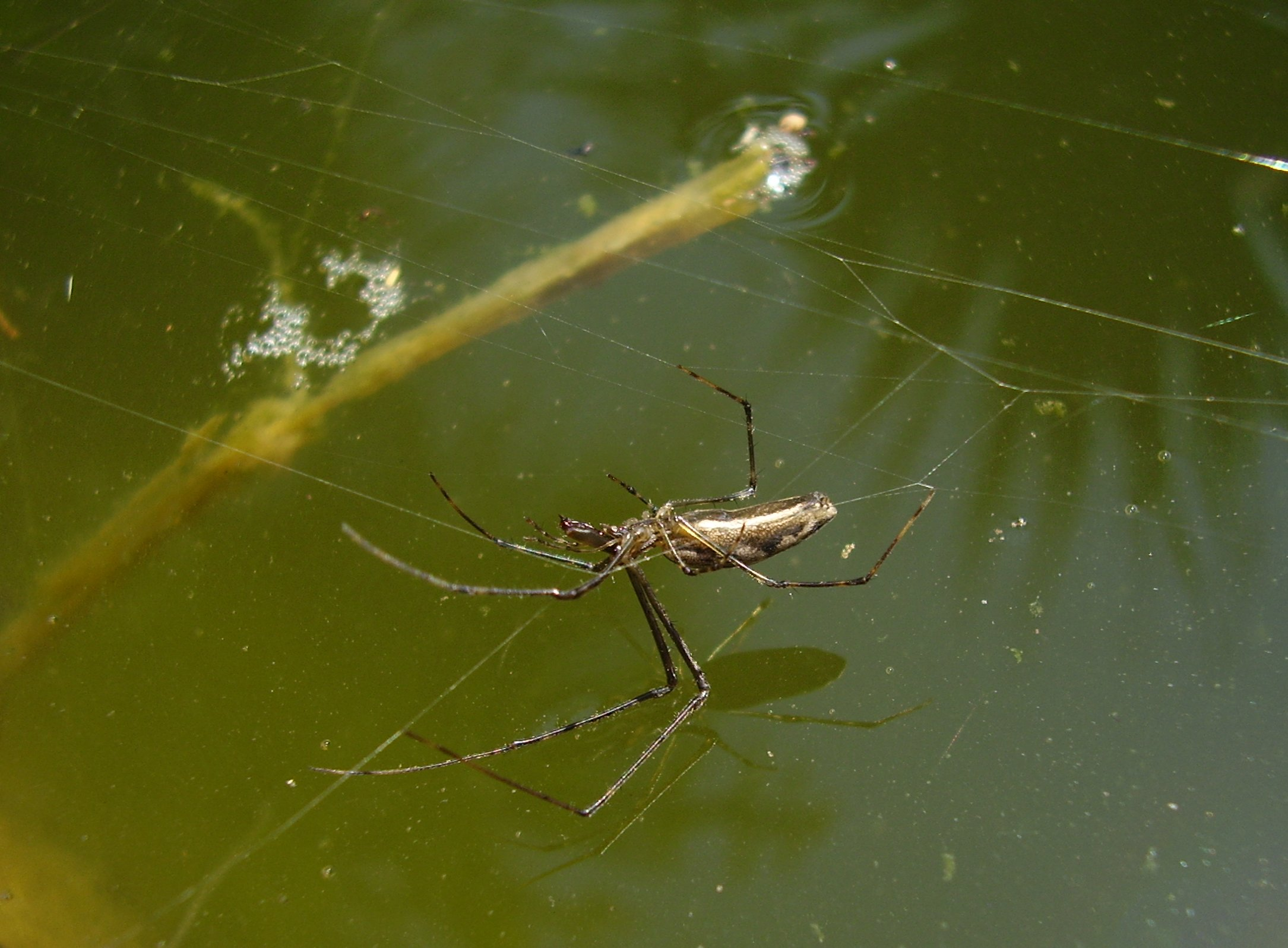
Silver longjawed orbweaver, Tetragnatha laboriosa

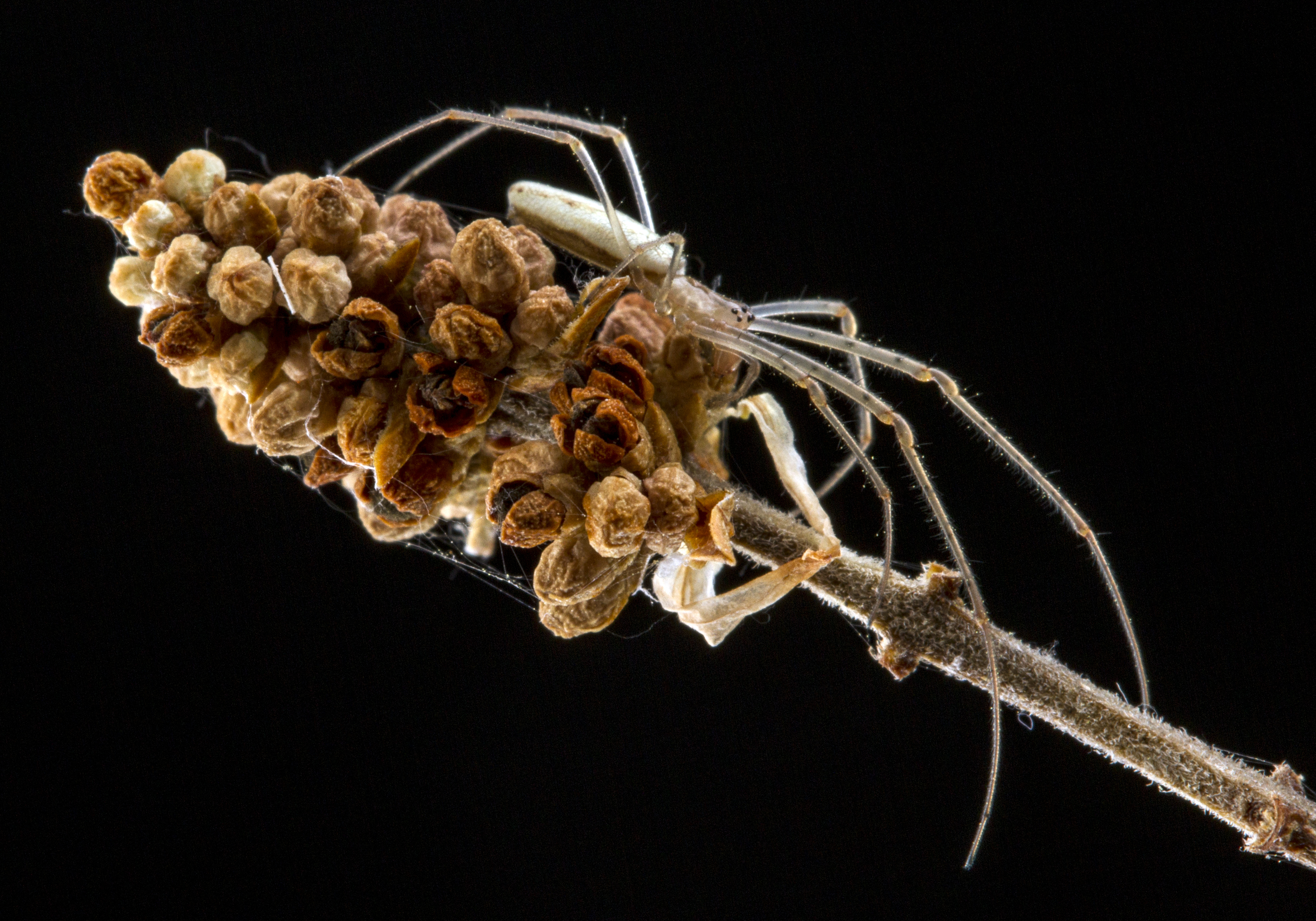
Silver longjawed orbweaver, Tetragnatha laboriosa

Pair of silverr long-jawed orb weaver spiders interacting, laying silk and lose the cranefly they were consuming to ants.
