= Harlanethis =

Scientific classification
- Kingdom: Animalia
- Phylum: Arthropoda
- Subphylum: Chelicerata
- Class: Arachnida
- Order: Araneae
- Infraorder: Araneomorphae
- Family: Tetragnathidae
- Genus: Harlanethis; Álvarez-Padilla, Kallal & Hormiga, 2020

Type species
- H. lipscombae Álvarez-Padilla, Kallal & Hormiga, 2020

Species
- Harlanethis lipscombae Álvarez-Padilla, Kallal & Hormiga, 2020; Harlanethis weintrauborum Álvarez-Padilla, Kallal & Hormiga, 2020

Genus of spiders

Harlanethis is a small genus of Australian long-jawed orb-weavers. It was first described by A. Álvarez-Padilla, R. J. Kallal and Gustavo Hormiga in 2020, and it has only been found in Australia. As of April 2022 it contains only two species: H. lipscombae and H. weintrauborum.
