= Leucognatha =

Scientific classification
- Kingdom: Animalia
- Phylum: Arthropoda
- Subphylum: Chelicerata
- Class: Arachnida
- Order: Araneae
- Infraorder: Araneomorphae
- Family: Tetragnathidae
- Genus: Leucognatha; Wunderlich, 1992

Type species
- Leucognatha acoreensis Wunderlich, 1992

Species
- See text.

Synonyms
- Sancus Tullgren, 1910, preoccupied

Genus of spiders

Leucognatha is a genus of long-jawed orb weavers (family Tetragnathidae) first described in 1910 using the name Sancus.

== Taxonomy ==
The genus was first described by Hugo Albert Tullgren in 1910 using the genus name Sancus. However, this name was already in use for a genus of skippers. In 1992, Jörg Wunderlich erected a new genus Leucognatha for a species from the Azores. In 2006, Leucognatha was synonymized with Sancus. In 2022, it was recognized that Sancus was not an available name for the spider genus, so that Wunderlich's Leucognatha became the correct name.

=== Species ===
As of February 2026, the genus contains two species:

- Leucognatha acoreensis Wunderlich, 1992 (type species) – Azores
- Leucognatha bilineata (Tullgren, 1910) – Kenya, Tanzania
