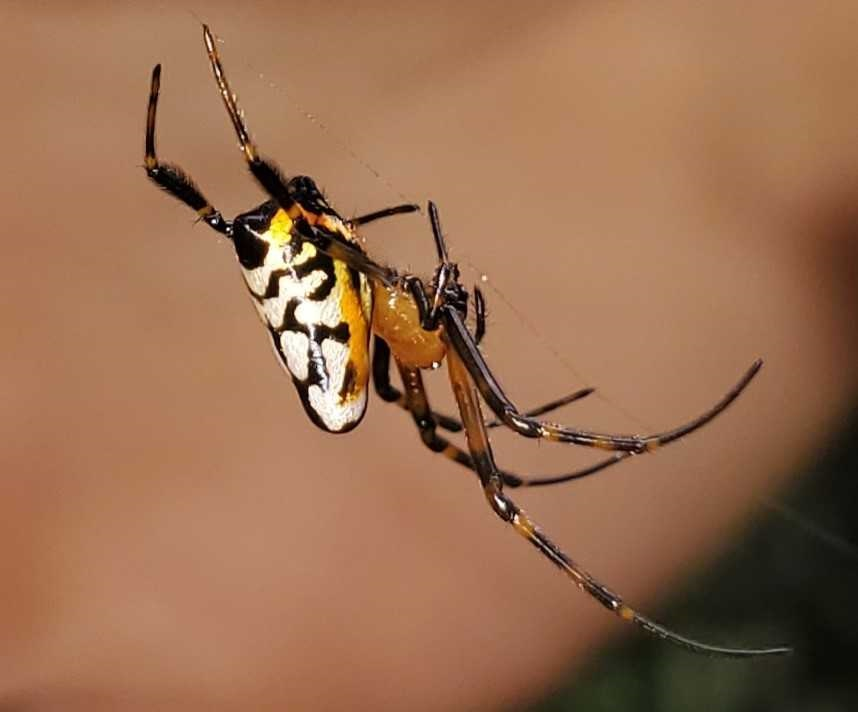
- Leucauge fastigata, Guam

Scientific classification
- Kingdom: Animalia
- Phylum: Arthropoda
- Subphylum: Chelicerata
- Class: Arachnida
- Order: Araneae
- Infraorder: Araneomorphae
- Family: Tetragnathidae
- Genus: Leucauge
- Species: L. fastigata

Binomial name
- Leucauge fastigata (Simon, 1877)

Subspecies
- Leucauge fastigata fastigata (Simon, 1877); Leucauge fastigata korinchica (Hogg, 1919)

Synonyms
- Argyroepeira fastigata (Pocock, 1900); Argyroepeira fastigiata (Simon, 1894); Argyroepeira fastuosa (Merian, 1911); Callinethis elegans (Thorell, 1895); Callinethis fastuosa (Thorell, 1890); Leucauge fastigata (Tikader, 1982); Leucauge fastigiata (Simon, 1905); Leucauge fastuosa (Roewer, 1938); Meta elegans (Thorell, 1877); Meta fastigata (Simon, 1877); Meta fastuosa (Thorell, 1877); Opadometa fastigata (Zhu, Song & Zhang, 2003); Opadometa fastigiata (Archer, 1951)

= Leucauge fastigata =

Species of spider

Leucauge fastigata, the pear-shaped leucauge, is a species of spiders in the family Tetragnathidae (long-jawed orb weavers). Its native range extends from India to the Philippines and Sulawesi.

Members of the species have silvery or golden spots on the abdomen. They are elongated spiders with long legs and chelicerae.

They are orb web weavers, weaving small orb webs with an open hub and few, wide-set radii and spirals. The webs have no signal line and no retreat. The web is a large horizontally-placed orb structure with a diameter of more than a metre. The entire web is often suspended by several long strands of silk attached to branches and leaves nearby.

This species is separated from other Leucauge spiders by its pear-shaped abdomen and its unique fourth leg. In addition to the two rows of curved hairs characteristic to its genus, it is the only species of Leucauge spiders with a thick brush of spines on its leg.

== Gallery ==
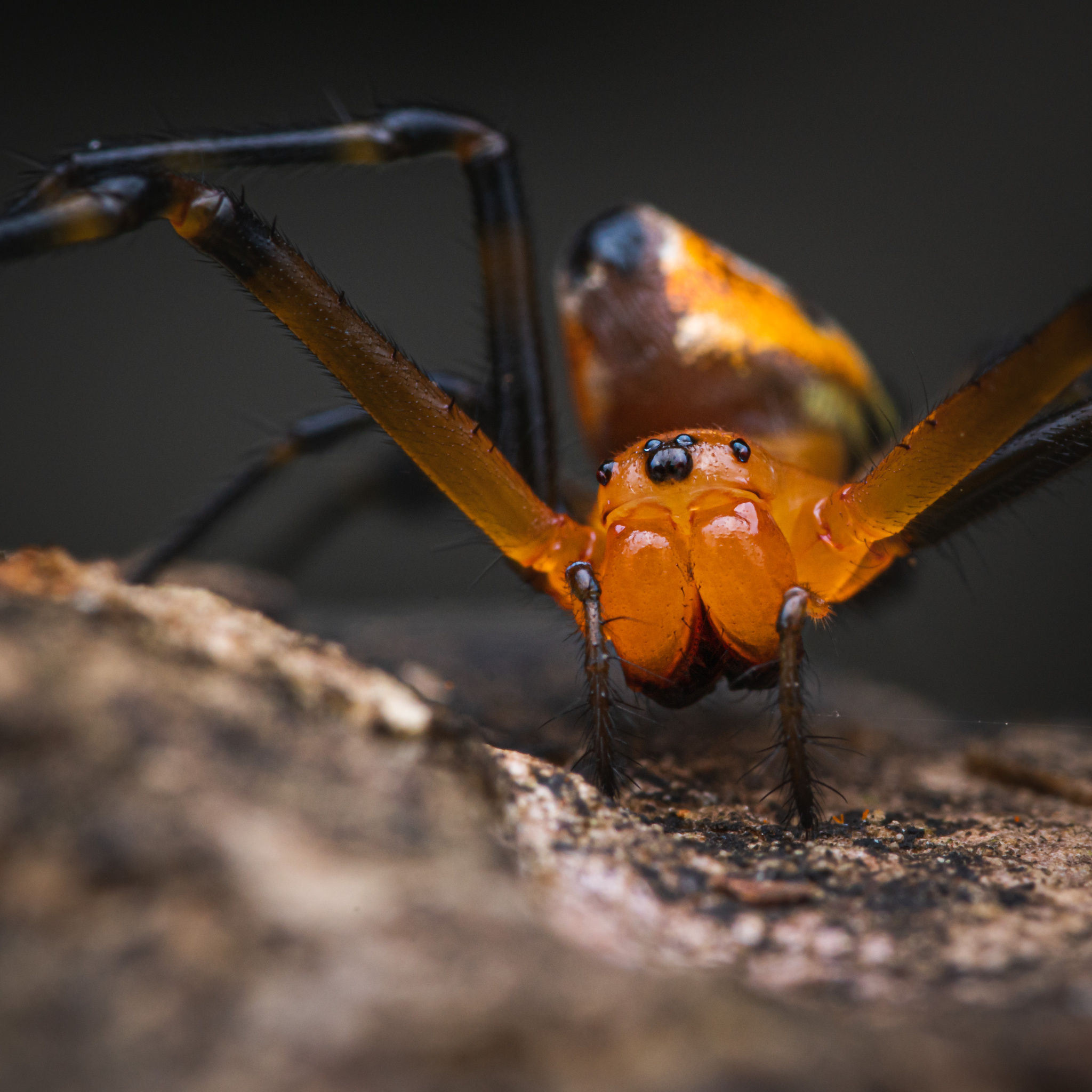
Frontal view. Philippines.

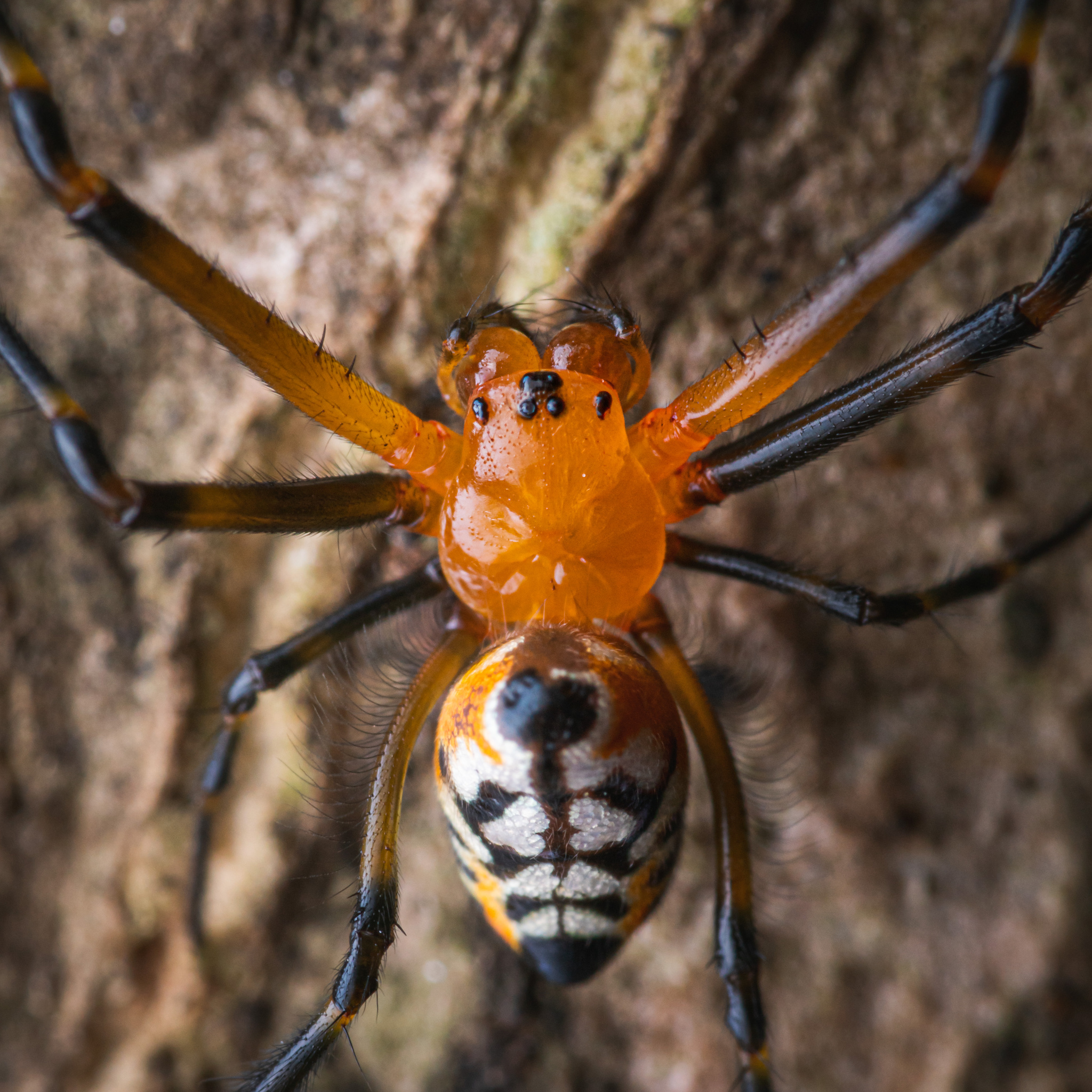
Dorsal view. Philippines.

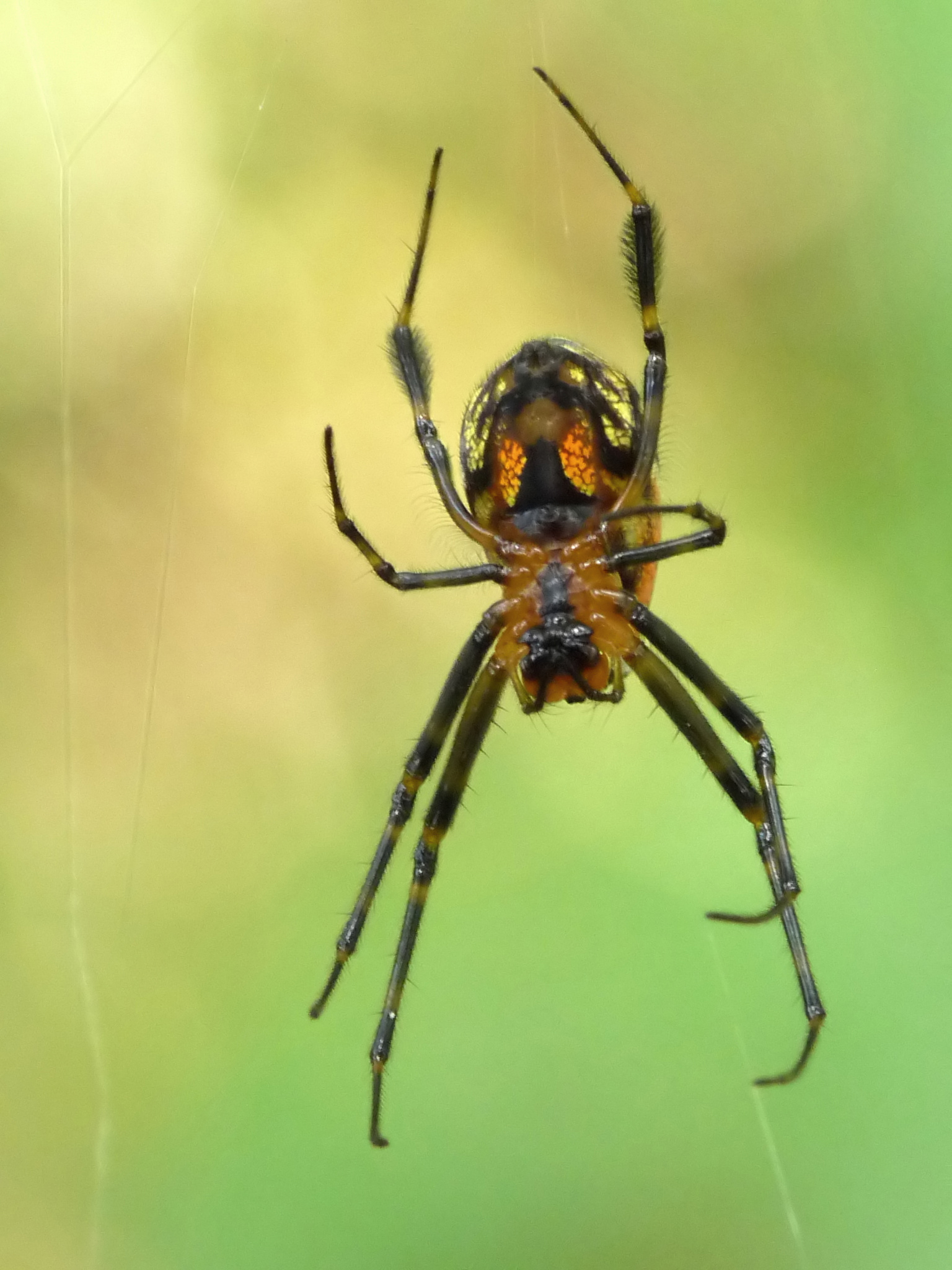
Ventral view. Kadavoor, Kerala, India

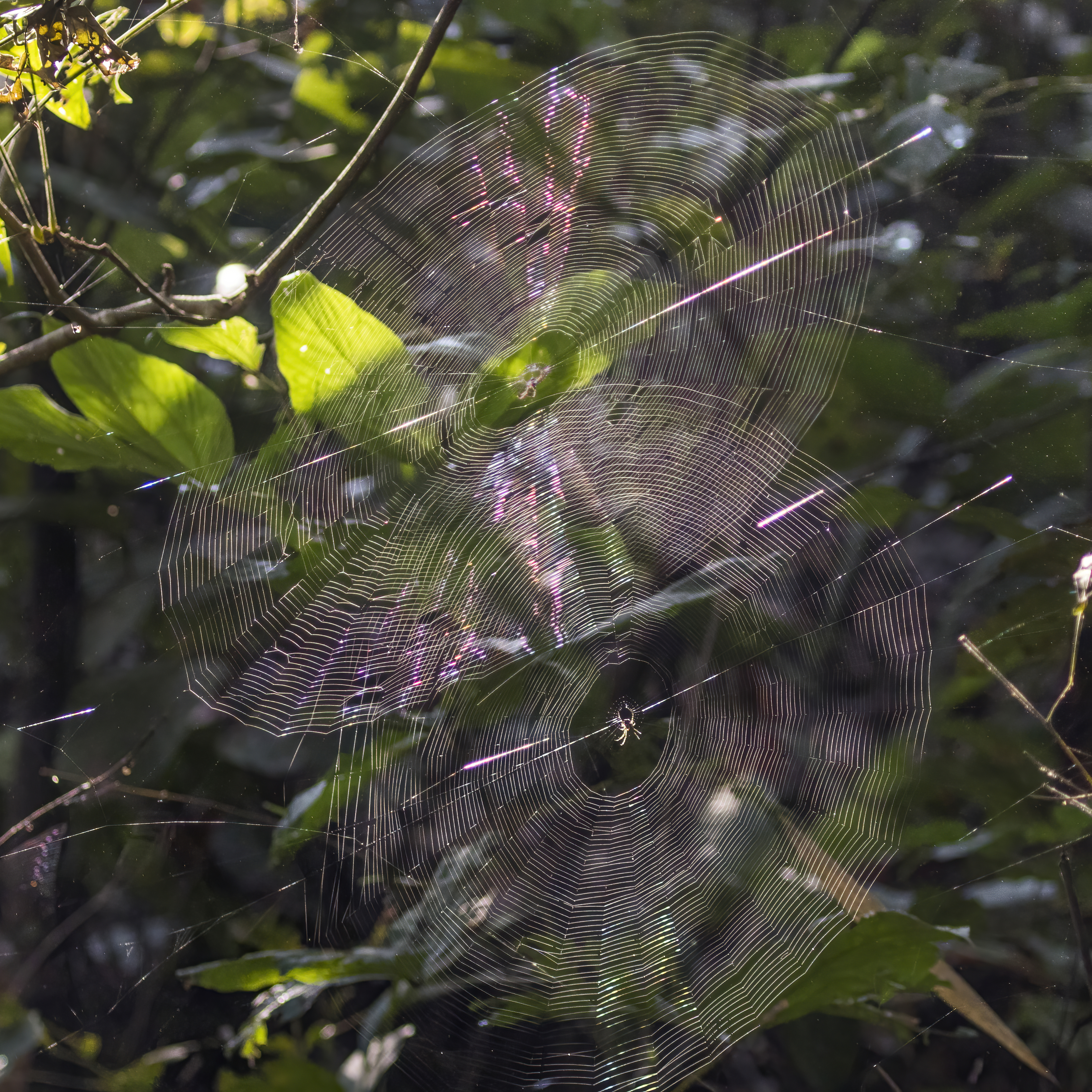
Webs. Madhya Pradesh, India
