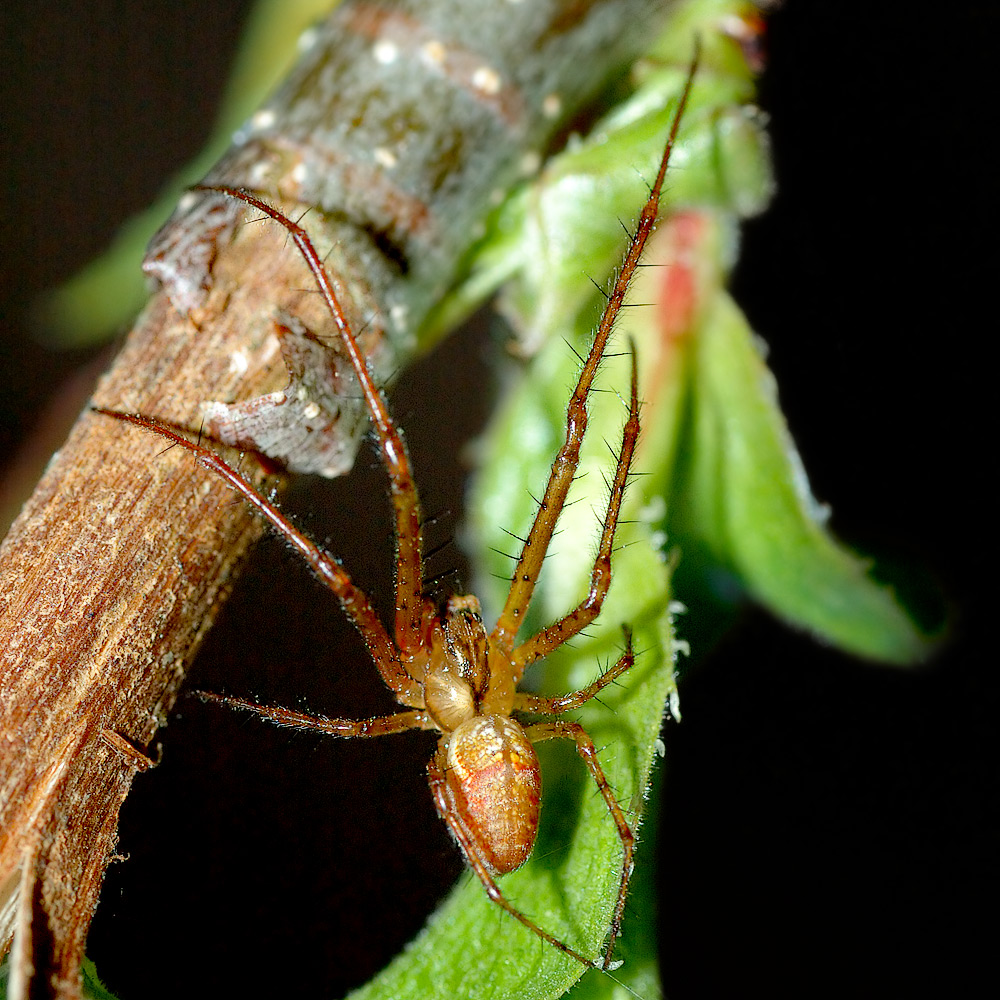
- Metellina mengei
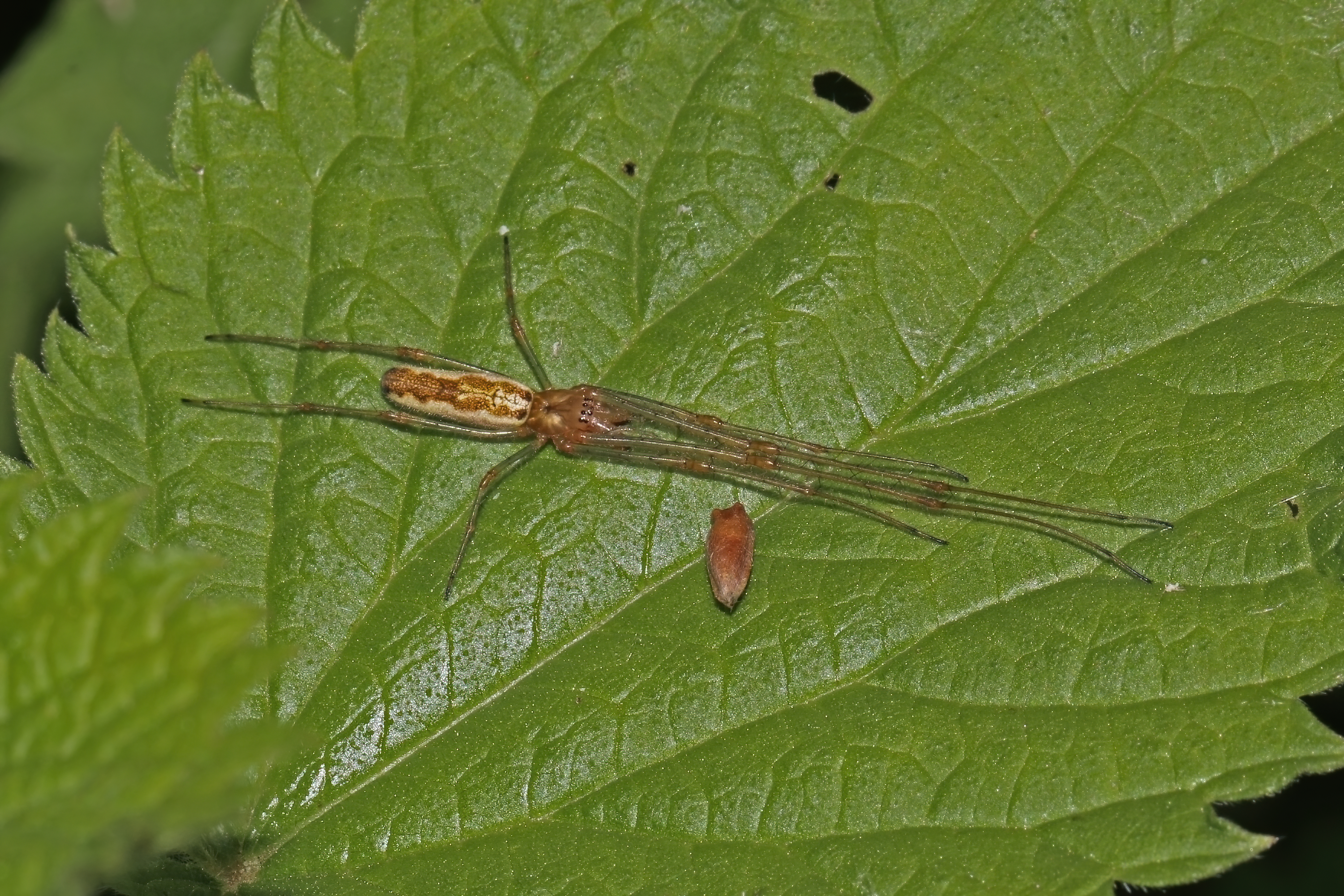
- Tetragnatha montana, female

Scientific classification
- Kingdom: Animalia
- Phylum: Arthropoda
- Subphylum: Chelicerata
- Class: Arachnida
- Order: Araneae
- Infraorder: Araneomorphae
- Family: Tetragnathidae; Menge, 1866

Diversity
- 45 genera, 990 species
- blue: reported countries (WSC) green: observation hotspots (iNaturalist)

= Long-jawed orb weaver =

Long-jawed orb-weavers Temporal range: Cretaceous–present

Family of spiders

Long-jawed orb weavers or long jawed spiders (Tetragnathidae) are a family of araneomorph spiders first described by Anton Menge in 1866. They have elongated bodies, legs, and chelicerae, and build small orb webs with an open hub with few, wide-set radii and spirals with no signal line or retreat. Some species are often found in long vegetation near water.

== Systematics ==
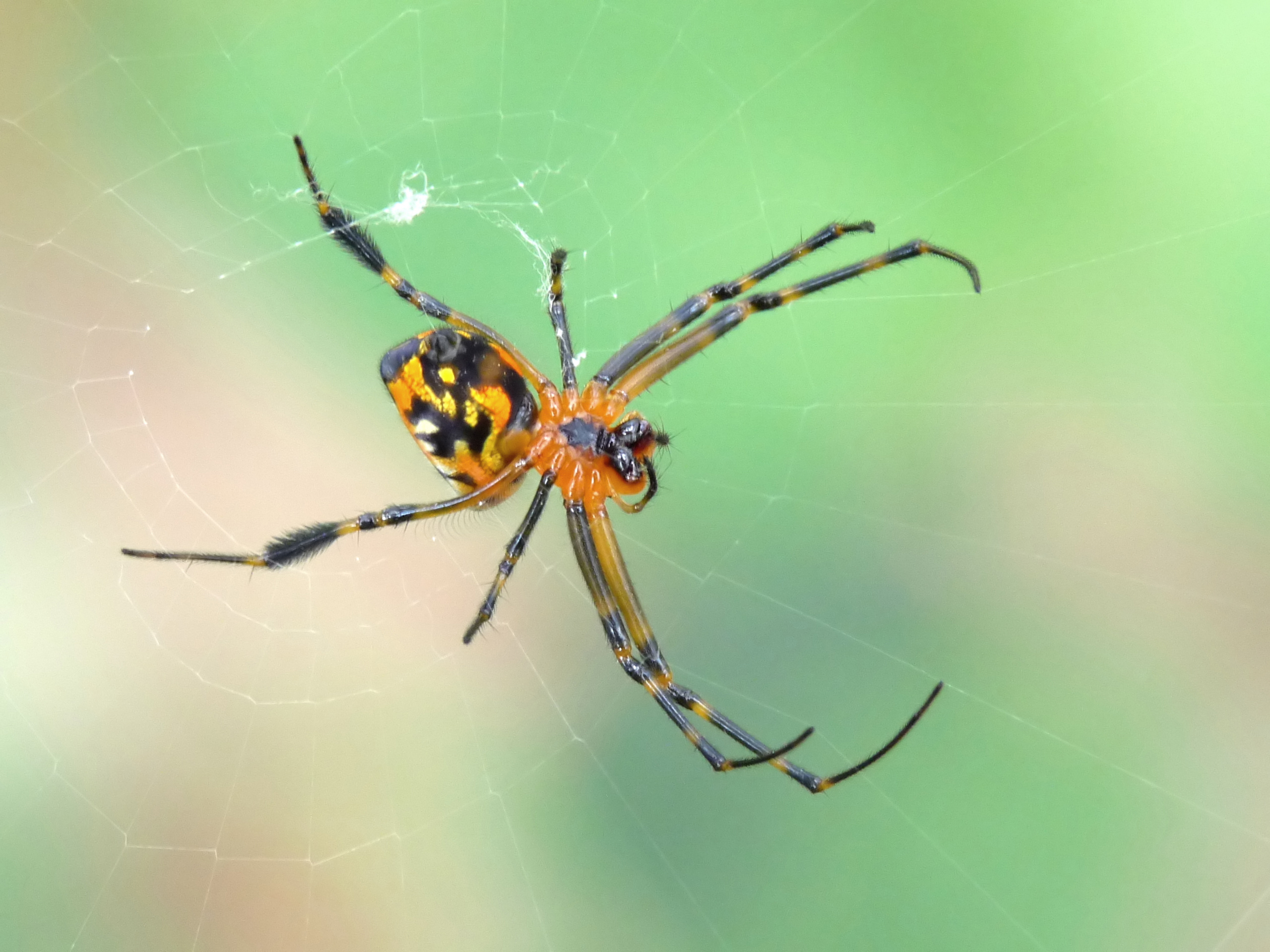
Opadometa fastigata in Kerala

Mating behaviour of Tetragnatha montana

Pair of silver long-jawed orb weaver spiders interacting, laying silk and losing the cranefly they were consuming to ants.

As of January 2026, this family includes 45 genera and 990 species:

- Allende Álvarez-Padilla, 2007 – Argentina, Chile
- Antillognatha Bryant, 1945 – Hispaniola
- Atelidea Simon, 1895 – India, Sri Lanka
- Azilia Keyserling, 1881 – Central America to Peru
- Chrysometa Simon, 1894 – North America, South America
- Cyrtognatha Keyserling, 1881 – North America, South America
- Dianleucauge Song & Zhu, 1994 – China
- Diphya Nicolet, 1849 – Madagascar, South Africa, Eastern Asia, Russia, South America
- Dolichognatha O. Pickard-Cambridge, 1869 – Africa, Asia, Cuba, North to South America, Ocenia
- Doryonychus Simon, 1900 – Hawaii
- Dyschiriognatha Simon, 1893 – Brazil, Malaysia, Oceania
- Glenognatha Simon, 1887 – Africa, Asia, North America, South America, French Polynesia, Marquesas Islands. Introduced to Seychelles, St. Helena, Brazil, Ecuador, Galapagos
- Harlanethis Álvarez-Padilla, Kallal & Hormiga, 2020 – Australia
- Hispanognatha Bryant, 1945 – Hispaniola
- Homalometa Simon, 1898 – Cuba, Costa Rica, Panama, Mexico, Brazil, Lesser Antilles
- Iamarra Álvarez-Padilla, Kallal & Hormiga, 2020 – Australia
- Leucauge White, 1841 – Africa, Asia, Oceania, Americas
- Leucognatha Wunderlich, 1992 – Kenya, Tanzania, Azores
- Mesida Kulczyński, 1911 – Asia, Oceania
- Meta C. L. Koch, 1835 – North Africa, Tanzania, South Africa, Asia, Australia, Madeira, Russia, Cuba, North America
- Metabus O. Pickard-Cambridge, 1899 – Dominican Republic, Guatemala, Mexico
- Metellina Chamberlin & Ivie, 1941 –Africa, Europe, Asia. Introduced to Canada
- Metleucauge Levi, 1980 – Asia, Russia, United States
- Mitoscelis Thorell, 1890 – Indonesia
- Mollemeta Álvarez-Padilla, 2007 – Chile
- Nanningia Zhu, Kim & Song, 1997 – China
- Nanometa Simon, 1908 – Australia, New Caledonia, Papua New Guinea, New Zealand
- Neoprolochus Reimoser, 1927 – Indonesia
- Okileucauge Tanikawa, 2001 – China, Japan
- Orsinome Thorell, 1890 – Asia, New Guinea
- Pachygnatha Sundevall, 1823 – Africa, Asia, Europe, Cuba, North America
- Parameta Simon, 1895 – Sierra Leone
- Parazilia Lessert, 1938 – DR Congo
- Pholcipes Schmidt & Krause, 1993 – Comoros
- Pickardinella Archer, 1951 – Mexico
- Pinkfloydia Hormiga & Dimitrov, 2011 – Australia
- Schenkeliella Strand, 1934 – Sri Lanka
- Taraire Álvarez-Padilla, Kallal & Hormiga, 2020 – New Zealand
- Tawhai Álvarez-Padilla, Kallal & Hormiga, 2020 – New Zealand
- Tetragnatha Latreille, 1804 – Worldwide
- Timonoe Thorell, 1898 – Myanmar
- Tylorida Simon, 1894 – West Africa, Asia to Australia
- Wolongia Zhu, Kim & Song, 1997 – China, India
- Zhinu Kallal & Hormiga, 2018 – Japan, Korea, Taiwan
- Zygiometella Wunderlich, 1995 – Israel, Cyprus

=== Fossil genera ===
Several extinct, fossil genera have been described:

- †Anameta Wunderlich, 2004 (Palaeogene, Bitterfield and Baltic amber)
- †Balticgnatha Wunderlich, 2004 (Palaeogene, Baltic amber)
- †Corneometa Wunderlich, 2004 (Palaeogene, Baltic amber)
- †Eometa Petrunkevitch, 1958 (Palaeogene, Baltic amber)
- †Huergnina Selden & Penney, 2003 (Cretaceous, Las Hoyas, Spain)
- †Macryphantes Selden, 1990 (Cretaceous)
- †Palaeometa Petrunkevitch, 1922 (Palaeogene, Florissant)
- †Palaeopachygnatha Petrunkevitch, 1922 (Palaeogene, Florissant)
- †Priscometa Petrunkevitch, 1958 (Palaeogene, Baltic amber)
- †Samlandicmeta Wunderlich, 2012 (Palaeogene, Baltic amber)

=== Formerly placed here ===
- Deliochus Simon, 1894 – now in Araneidae
- Eryciniolia Strand, 1912 – now a synonym of Nanometa
- Menosira Chikuni, 1955 – now a synonym of Metellina
- Nediphya Marusik & Omelko, 2017 – now a synonym of Nanometa
- Phonognatha Simon, 1894 – now in Araneidae
- Prolochus Thorell, 1895 – see Dolichognatha

== See also ==
A few common spiders in this family include:

- Leucauge mariana
- Leucauge argyra
- Leucauge venusta
