= Tetragnatha virescens =

Scientific classification
- Kingdom: Animalia
- Phylum: Arthropoda
- Subphylum: Chelicerata
- Class: Arachnida
- Order: Araneae
- Infraorder: Araneomorphae
- Family: Tetragnathidae
- Genus: Tetragnatha
- Species: T. virescens

Binomial name
- Tetragnatha virescens Okuma, 1979

Species of spider

Tetragnatha virescens is a species of spider of the genus Tetragnatha. It is found in Bangladesh, Sri Lanka to Indonesia, and Philippines. The species is more commonly found during the early vegetative growth stage of the rice plant, where they are important predators. Male is about 5.9 to 7.8 mm in length without chelicerae. Anterior row of eyes occupying the full width of carapace. Maxilla are nearly parallel. All legs with spines and hair. Female is larger than male, usually about 6.55 to 8.25 mm in length. Body is light green in color, which is suitable for the survival among paddy leaves.
