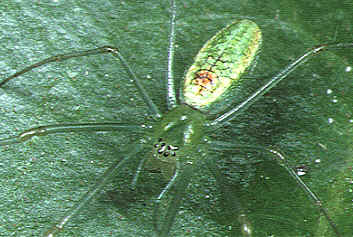
- female from Okinawa
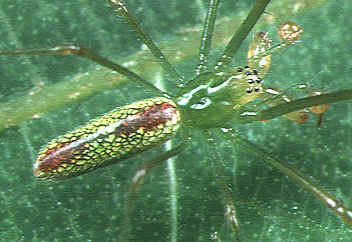
- male from Okinawa

Scientific classification
- Kingdom: Animalia
- Phylum: Arthropoda
- Subphylum: Chelicerata
- Class: Arachnida
- Order: Araneae
- Infraorder: Araneomorphae
- Family: Tetragnathidae
- Genus: Tetragnatha
- Species: T. squamata

Binomial name
- Tetragnatha squamata Karsch, 1879

Synonyms
- Tetragnatha recurva Schenkel, 1936; Tetragnatha bandapula Barrion-Dupo, Barrion & Heong, 2013; Tetragnatha laochenga Barrion, Barrion-Dupo & Heong, 2013

= Tetragnatha squamata =

Species of spider

Tetragnatha squamata is a species of long-jawed orb weaver spider in the family Tetragnathidae.

The species name squamata derives from the Latin word squama, meaning "scale", referring to the scale-like markings on the opisthosoma.

== Distribution ==
T. squamata has been recorded from India, China, Taiwan, Russia (Far East), South Korea, and Japan. It is widely distributed across rice-growing regions of East and South Asia.

== Habitat ==
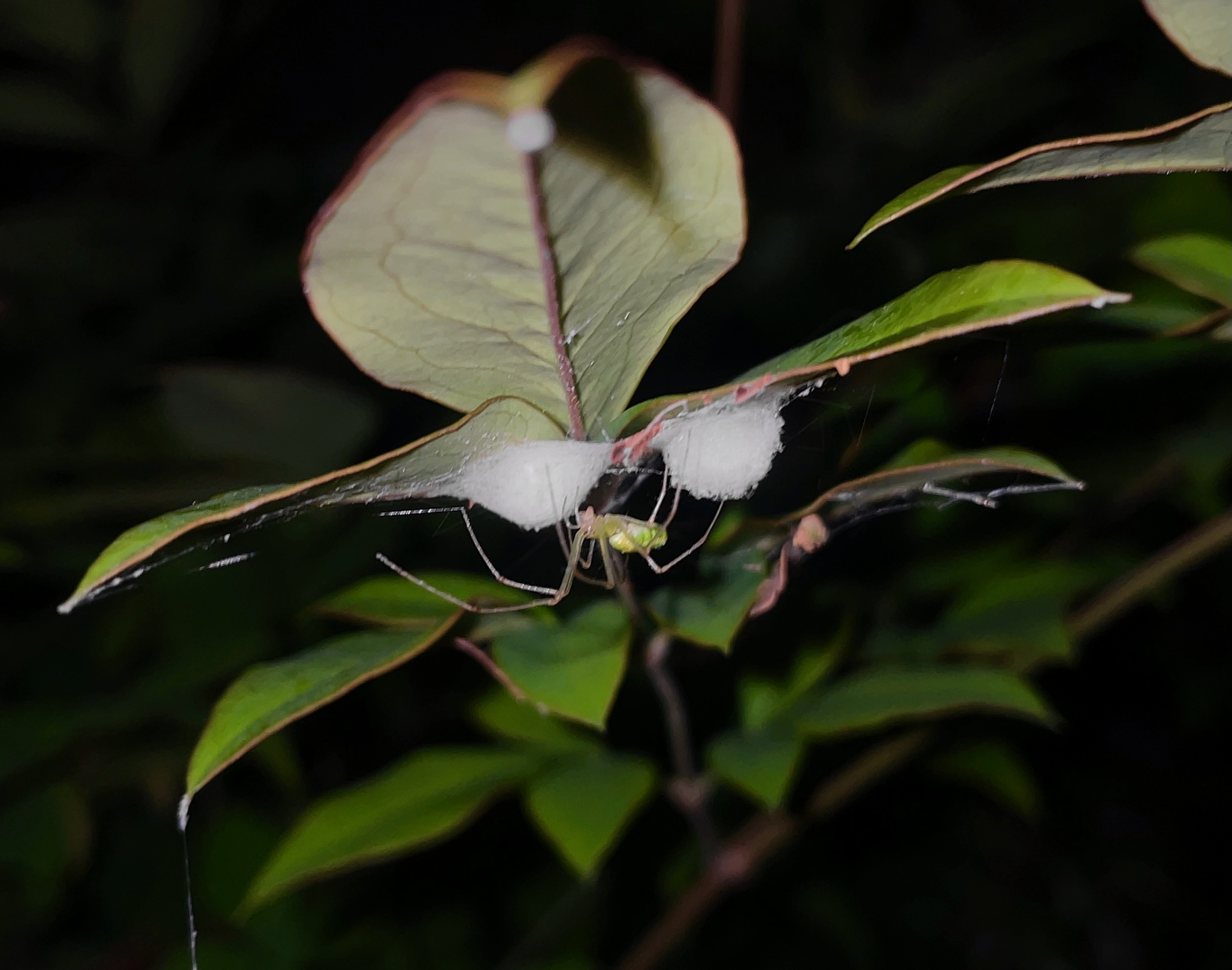
Female with egg masses

This species is commonly found in agricultural environments, particularly in rice paddies and other wetland habitats. Adults are active from spring to summer and are often found on vegetation near water sources.

== Description ==
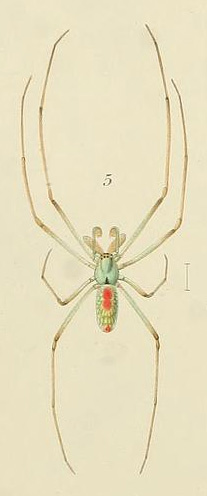
Diagnostic drawing of male (1906)

Tetragnatha squamata is a medium-sized long-jawed orb weaver with distinct sexual dimorphism. The female measures 5-8 mm in body length, while males are slightly smaller at 4-6 mm.

The cephalothorax and appendages are uniformly brownish-yellow in coloration. The elongated opisthosoma is covered with large silvery scales that create a distinctive reticulated pattern of brown netlike markings. In most specimens, a broad brown band extends transversely across the dorsal surface from front to back and along the sides of the abdomen. The ventral surface between the vulva and mammillae shows very small silvery scales with a glossy brown coloration forming a rhombic longitudinal band.

Females have simple chelicerae without external tooth formation, and their vulva is not fully developed in immature specimens. In mature males, the chelicerae are short and oval-shaped. The dorsal surface has an elongated forward-projecting tooth near the middle, and the tip has two small teeth above the insertion point of the cheliceral claw. Below this, the anterior end extends into a bright yellow, elongated tooth-like process. The claw is wavy and curved. The inner margin of the chelicerae bears seven teeth on the upper side and one larger tooth on the lower side.

The male pedipalp is distinctively modified, with a spoon-shaped, hollow, narrow secondary vessel that extends beyond the densely hairy, bulbous primary vessel with its pointed tip.
