= Tetragnatha pallescens =

Scientific classification
- Domain: Eukaryota
- Kingdom: Animalia
- Phylum: Arthropoda
- Subphylum: Chelicerata
- Class: Arachnida
- Order: Araneae
- Infraorder: Araneomorphae
- Family: Tetragnathidae
- Genus: Tetragnatha
- Species: T. pallescens

Binomial name
- Tetragnatha pallescens F. O. P.-Cambridge, 1903

Species of spider

Tetragnatha pallescens is a species of long-jawed orb weaver in the spider family Tetragnathidae. It is found in North, Central America, and the Caribbean Sea.
