= Tetragnatha tenera =

Scientific classification
- Kingdom: Animalia
- Phylum: Arthropoda
- Subphylum: Chelicerata
- Class: Arachnida
- Order: Araneae
- Infraorder: Araneomorphae
- Family: Tetragnathidae
- Genus: Tetragnatha
- Species: T. tenera

Binomial name
- Tetragnatha tenera Karsch, 1892

Species of spider

Tetragnatha tenera, is a species of spider of the genus Tetragnatha. It is found in India, Sri Lanka and Queensland.
