= Tetragnatha caffra =

Caffra Long-jawed Spider

Scientific classification
- Kingdom: Animalia
- Phylum: Arthropoda
- Subphylum: Chelicerata
- Class: Arachnida
- Order: Araneae
- Infraorder: Araneomorphae
- Family: Tetragnathidae
- Genus: Tetragnatha
- Species: T. caffra

Binomial name
- Tetragnatha caffra (Strand, 1909)

Synonyms
- Eucta caffra Strand, 1909

Species of spider

Tetragnatha caffra is a species of spider in the family Tetragnathidae. It is endemic to South Africa and is commonly known as Caffra long-jawed spider.

== Distribution ==
Tetragnatha caffra is known only from a juvenile from the type locality Fish Hoek in the Western Cape, at an altitude of approximately 60 m.

== Habitat and ecology ==
This orb-web dwelling species has been sampled from the Fynbos Biome. Little else is known about its lifestyle.

== Conservation ==
Tetragnatha caffra is listed as Data Deficient for taxonomic reasons. The species is known only from a single unspecified site based on a juvenile specimen. Additional sampling is needed to collect adults and determine the species' range. Threats to the species are unknown.

== Taxonomy ==
The species has not been revised since its original description. It was originally described by Strand in 1909 as Eucta caffra based on a juvenile specimen. The description is not illustrated, and the species remains poorly characterized.
