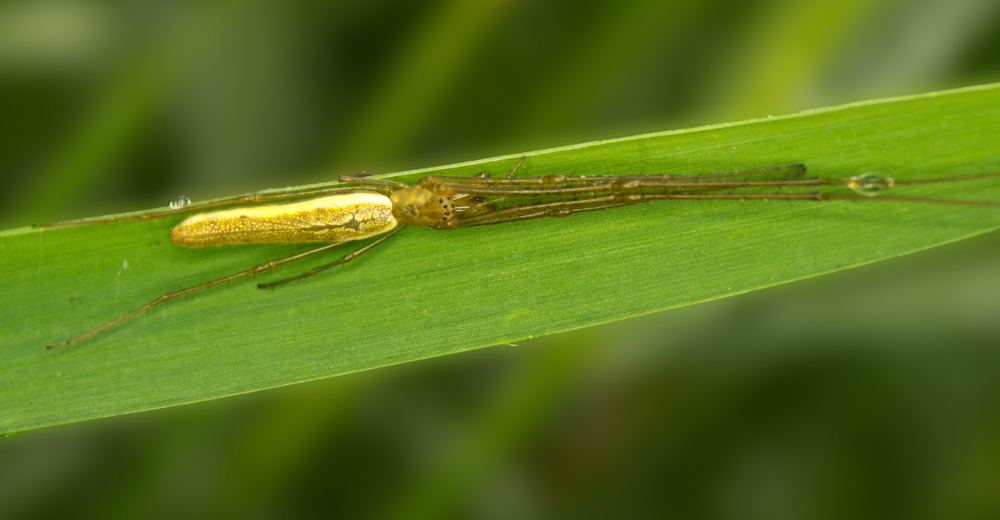

Scientific classification
- Domain: Eukaryota
- Kingdom: Animalia
- Phylum: Arthropoda
- Subphylum: Chelicerata
- Class: Arachnida
- Order: Araneae
- Infraorder: Araneomorphae
- Family: Tetragnathidae
- Genus: Tetragnatha
- Species: T. straminea

Binomial name
- Tetragnatha straminea Emerton, 1884

= Tetragnatha straminea =

Species of spider

Tetragnatha straminea is a species of long-jawed orb weaver in the spider family Tetragnathidae. It is found in the United States, Canada, and Cuba.
