= Tetragnatha guatemalensis =

Scientific classification
- Kingdom: Animalia
- Phylum: Arthropoda
- Subphylum: Chelicerata
- Class: Arachnida
- Order: Araneae
- Infraorder: Araneomorphae
- Family: Tetragnathidae
- Genus: Tetragnatha
- Species: T. guatemalensis

Binomial name
- Tetragnatha guatemalensis O. P.-Cambridge, 1889

Species of spider

Tetragnatha guatemalensis, the Guatemalan long-jawed spider, is a species of long-jawed orb weaver in the family Tetragnathidae. It is found in North, Central America, Cuba, and Jamaica. Under certain conditions, such as mass emergence of midges, the spiders will weave communal webs.
