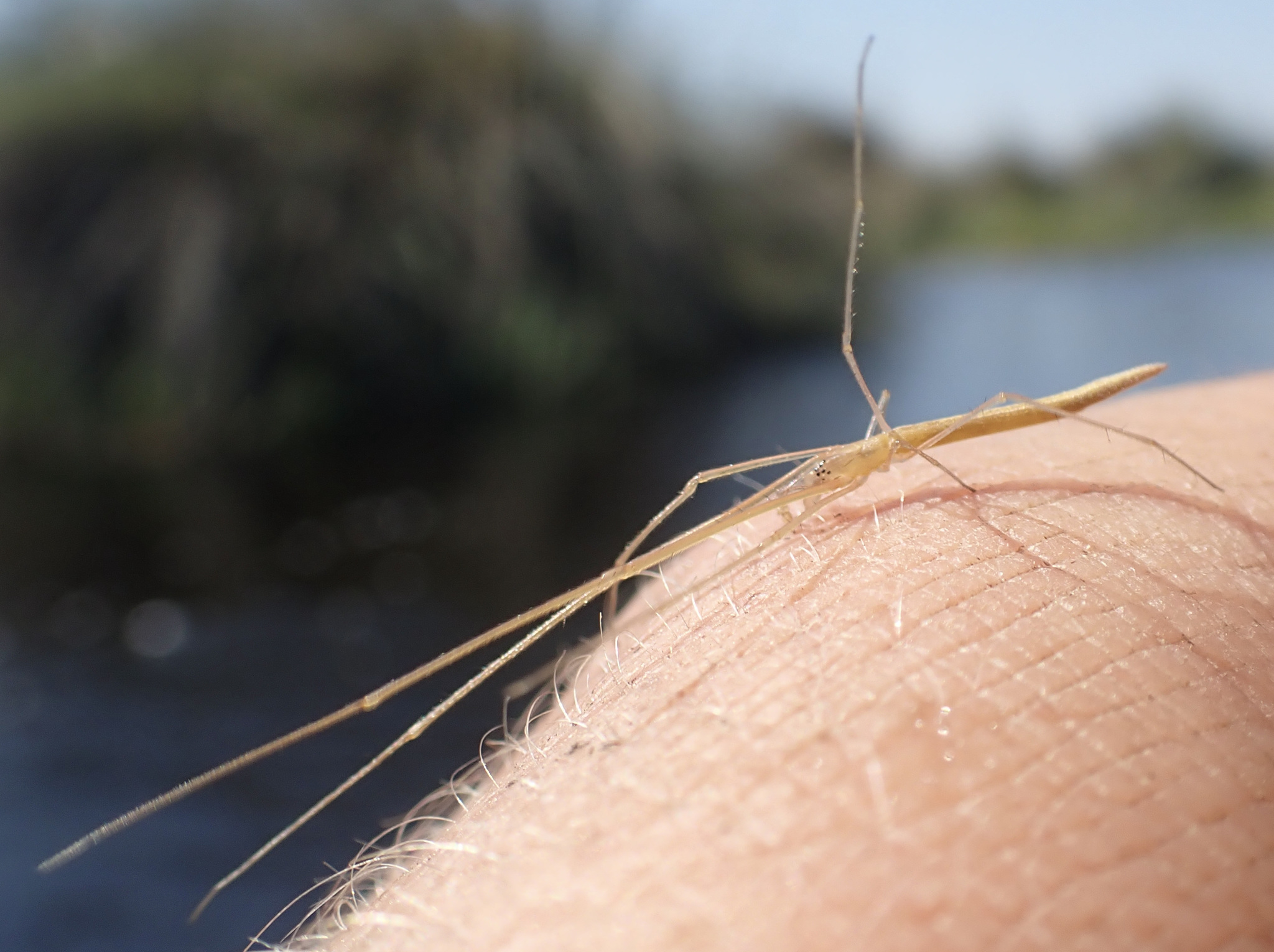

Scientific classification
- Kingdom: Animalia
- Phylum: Arthropoda
- Subphylum: Chelicerata
- Class: Arachnida
- Order: Araneae
- Infraorder: Araneomorphae
- Family: Tetragnathidae
- Genus: Tetragnatha
- Species: T. isidis

Binomial name
- Tetragnatha isidis (Simon, 1880)

Synonyms
- Eugnatha isidis Simon, 1880; Eucta gallica Simon, 1881; Eucta lutescens Lendl, 1886; Eucta isidis Lessert, 1915

= Tetragnatha isidis =

Isidis Long-jawed Spider

Species of spider

Tetragnatha isidis is a species of spider in the family Tetragnathidae. It occurs across southern Europe, Africa, and parts of Asia, and is commonly known as Isidis long-jawed spider.

== Distribution ==
Tetragnatha isidis is distributed from Southern Europe to India and across several African countries including Egypt, Sudan, Uganda, Botswana, and South Africa. The species also occurs in Iran. In South Africa, it is known from four provinces, including six protected areas, at altitudes ranging from 4 to 1498 m.

== Habitat and ecology ==
These spiders construct orb webs in grass, with the web supported by grass stems. The species has been sampled from the Fynbos, Indian Ocean Coastal Belt, Forests, Grassland, and Savanna biomes.

== Description ==
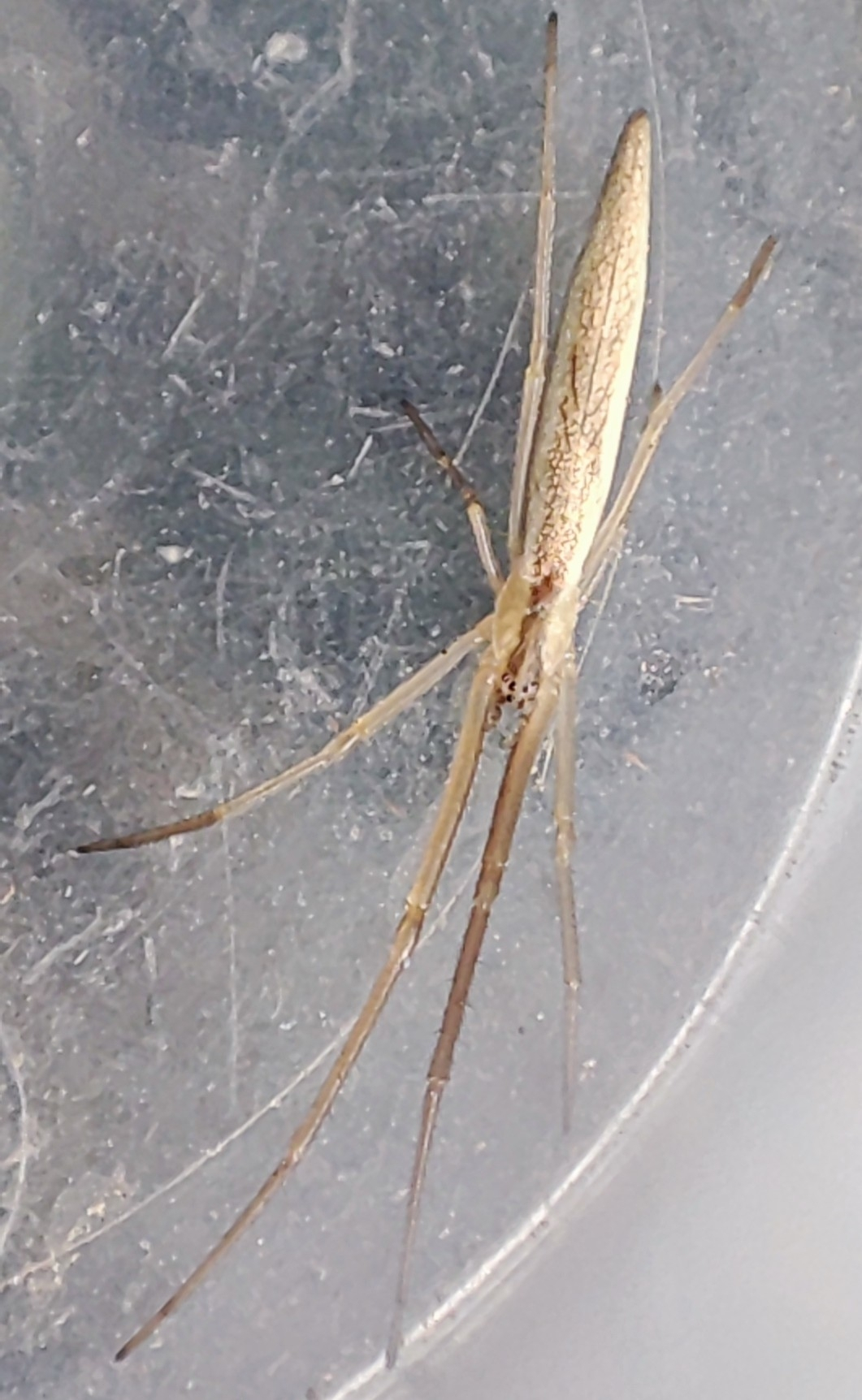

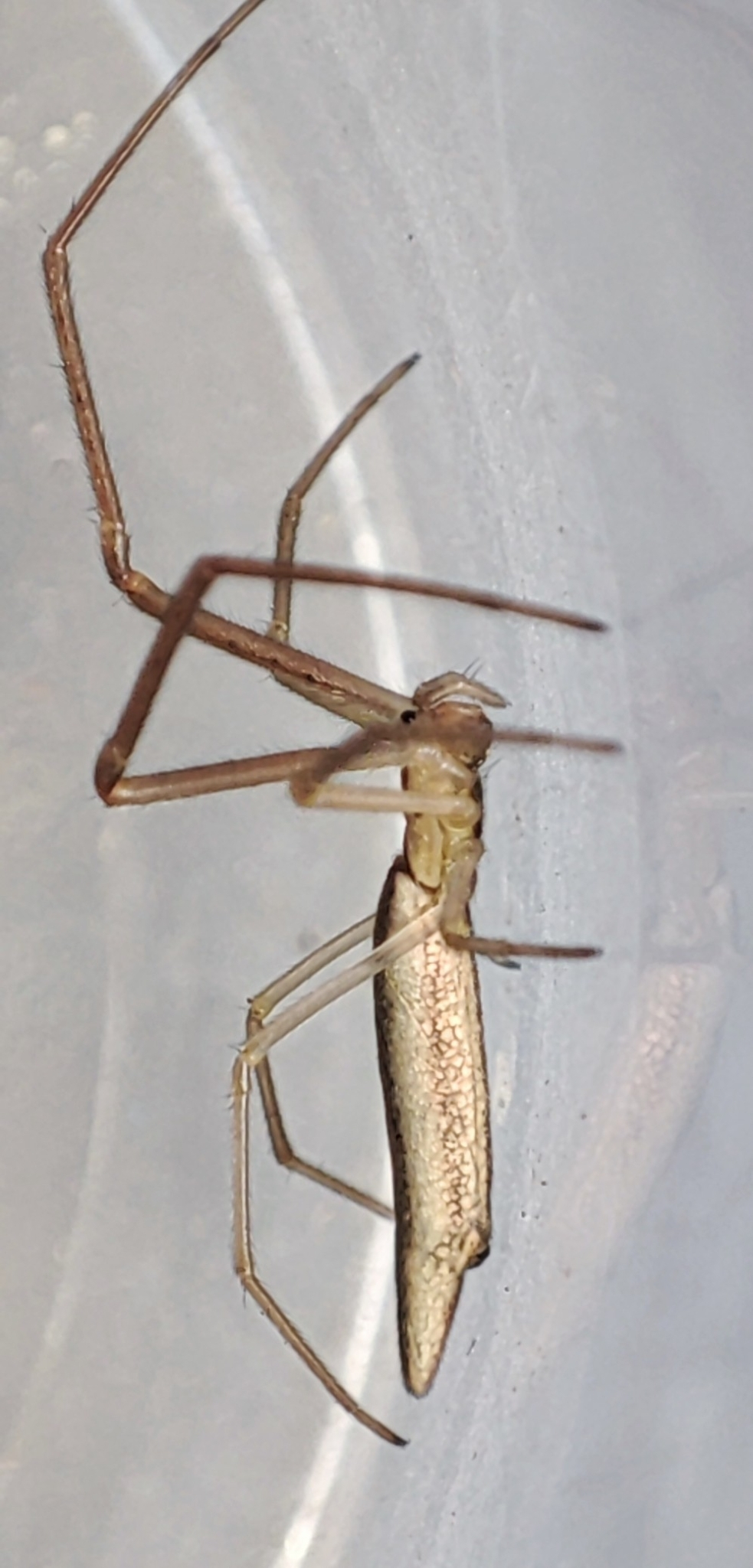

== Conservation ==
Tetragnatha isidis is listed as Least Concern due to its wide geographical range spanning multiple countries across Europe, Africa, and Asia. The species is protected in Roodeplaatdam Nature Reserve and Nylsvley Nature Reserve in South Africa. There are no significant threats to the species.

== Taxonomy ==
The species was redescribed by Picard and colleagues in 2014. It was originally described from Egypt by Simon in 1880 as Eugnatha isidis and was moved to Tetragnatha by Wunderlich in 2011. Both sexes are known.
