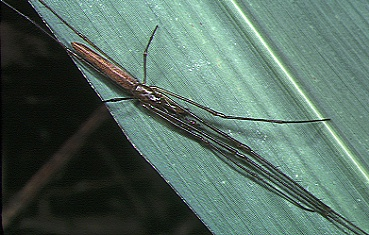
- Male
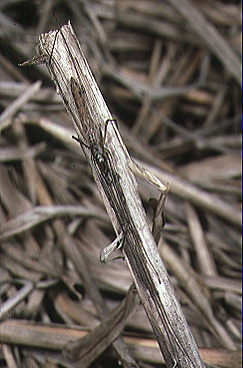
- Female

Scientific classification
- Kingdom: Animalia
- Phylum: Arthropoda
- Subphylum: Chelicerata
- Class: Arachnida
- Order: Araneae
- Infraorder: Araneomorphae
- Family: Tetragnathidae
- Genus: Tetragnatha
- Species: T. mandibulata

Binomial name
- Tetragnatha mandibulata Walckenaer, 1841

Synonyms
- Tetragnatha graciliventris Schenkel, 1963

= Tetragnatha mandibulata =

Species of arachnid

Tetragnatha mandibulata is a species of long-jawed orb-weaver spider in the family Tetragnathidae. It was first described by Walckenaer in 1841. The species is widespread and occurs in western Africa, southern and eastern Asia, and Australia.
