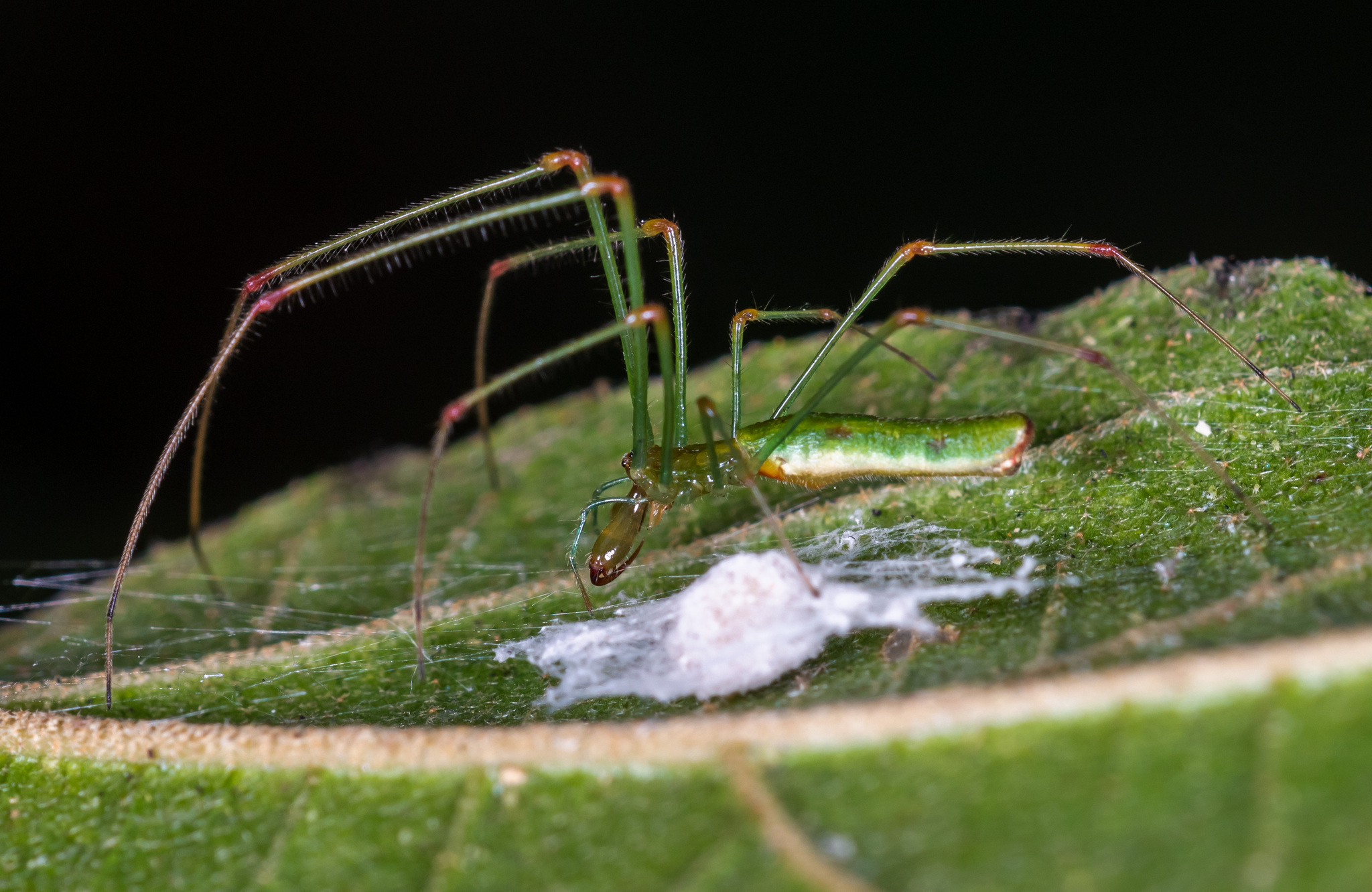
- female from Malaysia
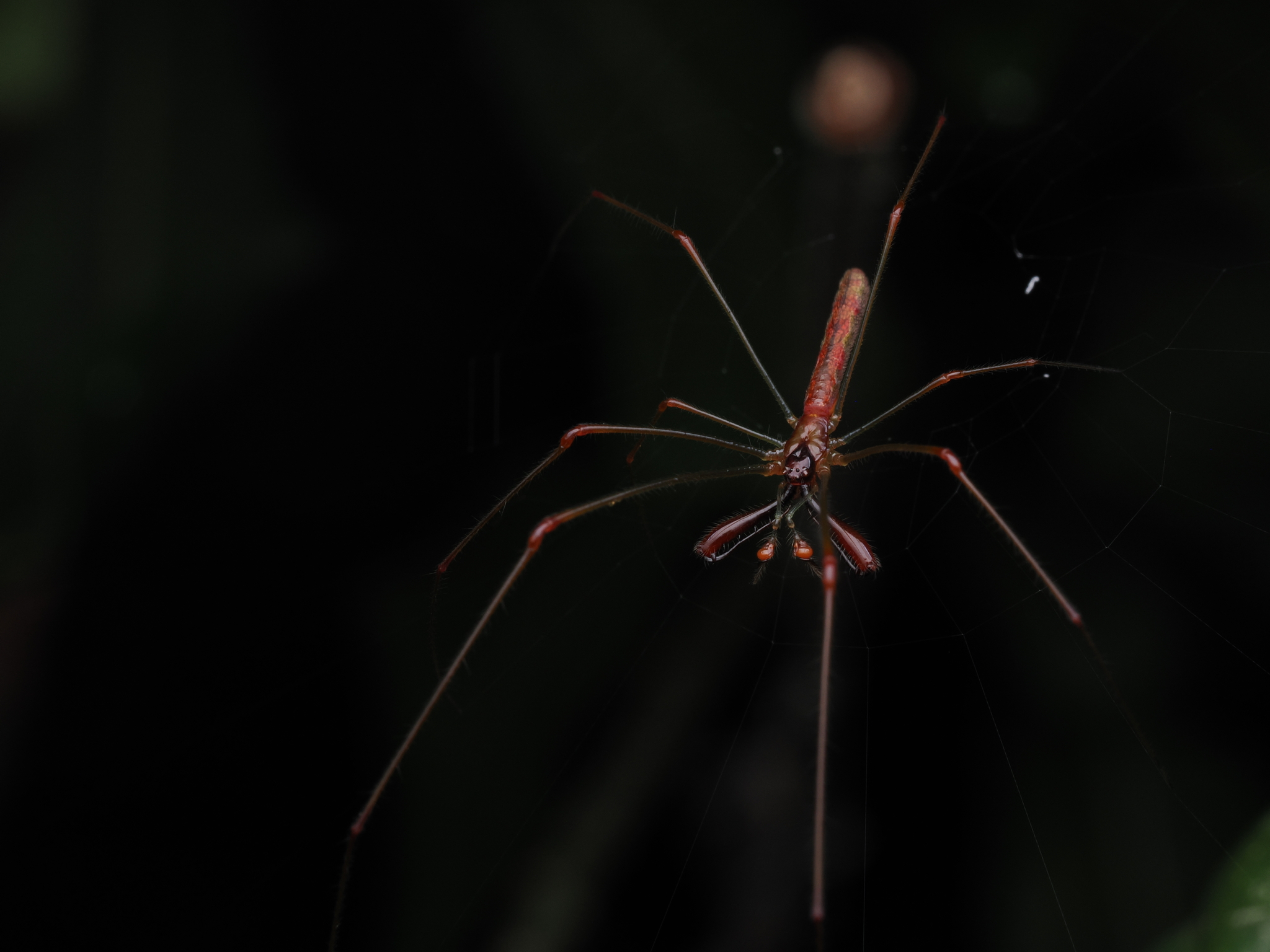
- male from Indonesia

Scientific classification
- Kingdom: Animalia
- Phylum: Arthropoda
- Subphylum: Chelicerata
- Class: Arachnida
- Order: Araneae
- Infraorder: Araneomorphae
- Family: Tetragnathidae
- Genus: Tetragnatha
- Species: T. hasselti

Binomial name
- Tetragnatha hasselti Thorell, 1890

Synonyms
- Tetragnatha aduncata Wang, 1991; Tetragnatha zhuzhenrongi Barrion et al., 2013

= Tetragnatha hasselti =

Species of spider

Tetragnatha hasselti is a species of long-jawed orb weaver spider in the family Tetragnathidae. It has a wide distribution across Asia, from India to China and Indonesia (Sulawesi).

== Taxonomy ==
The species was first described by Tamerlan Thorell in 1890 from a female specimen collected at Gorontalo in Sulawesi, Indonesia. The species was named in honor of A. W. M. Van Hasselt, who provided the type specimen to Thorell.

Two species have been synonymized with T. hasselti: Tetragnatha aduncata Wang, 1991 was synonymized by Song, Zhu & Chen (1999), and Tetragnatha zhuzhenrongi Barrion et al., 2013 was more recently synonymized by Lin et al. (2023).

== Distribution ==
T. hasselti is widely distributed across Asia. It has been recorded from India, China, and Indonesia (Sulawesi). The species appears to be particularly common in rice field habitats across its range.

== Habitat ==
Tetragnatha hasselti is commonly found in rice fields and other agricultural habitats.

== Description ==
The original description by Thorell noted that females reach about 12 millimeters in total body length, with the cephalothorax measuring approximately 3.5 mm long and 1.5 mm wide. The species is characterized by its distinctive chelicerae, which are long and strongly curved outward at the base, with a complex arrangement of teeth along the cheliceral furrow.

The cephalothorax is dark brown to blackish, while the abdomen appears grayish-silver due to dense minute silvery-white spots scattered across a dark grayish-black background. The legs are yellowish to reddish-testaceous.
