= Tetragnatha flavida =

Conservation status
- Data Deficit (NZ TCS)

Scientific classification
- Kingdom: Animalia
- Phylum: Arthropoda
- Subphylum: Chelicerata
- Class: Arachnida
- Order: Araneae
- Infraorder: Araneomorphae
- Family: Tetragnathidae
- Genus: Tetragnatha
- Species: T. flavida

Binomial name
- Tetragnatha flavida Urquhart, 1891

Species of Arachnida

Tetragnatha flavida is a species of Tetragnathidae spider that is endemic to New Zealand.

== Taxonomy ==
This species was described in 1891 by Arthur Urquhart from male and female specimens. It was most recently revised in 1917.

== Description ==
The male is recorded at 9.1mm in length whereas the female is 10.5mm. This species has a light brownish yellow cephalothorax, straw coloured legs and an abdomen with metallic coloured flecks.

== Distribution ==
This species is endemic to New Zealand.

== Conservation status ==
Under the New Zealand Threat Classification System, this species is listed as "Data Deficient" with the qualifiers of "Data Poor: Size" and "Data Poor: Trend".
