= Tetragnatha viridis =

Scientific classification
- Domain: Eukaryota
- Kingdom: Animalia
- Phylum: Arthropoda
- Subphylum: Chelicerata
- Class: Arachnida
- Order: Araneae
- Infraorder: Araneomorphae
- Family: Tetragnathidae
- Genus: Tetragnatha
- Species: T. viridis

Binomial name
- Tetragnatha viridis Walckenaer, 1841

Species of spider

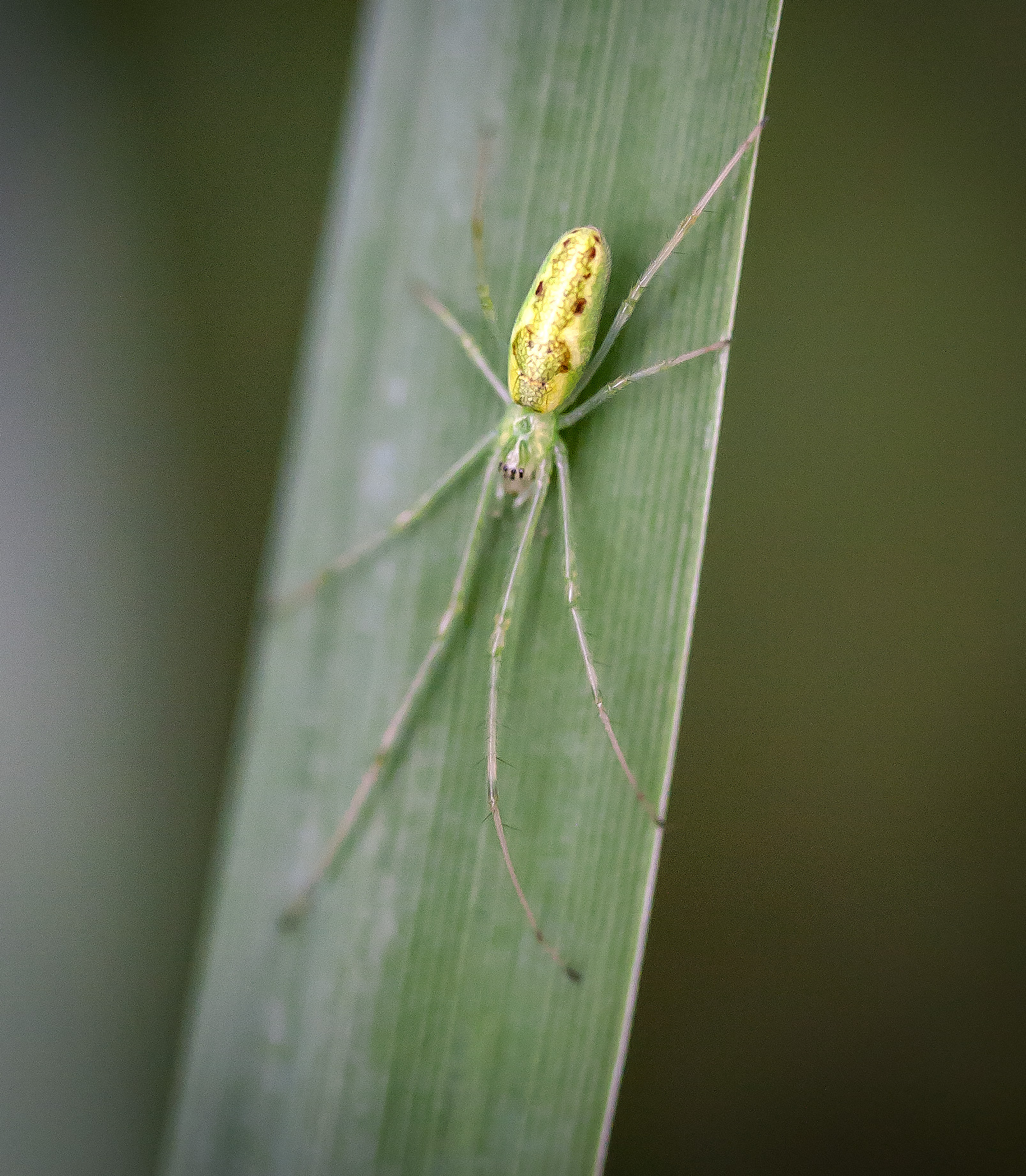
Tetragnatha viridis Dorsal view

Tetragnatha viridis is a species of long-jawed orb weaver in the family of spiders known as Tetragnathidae. It is found in the United States.
