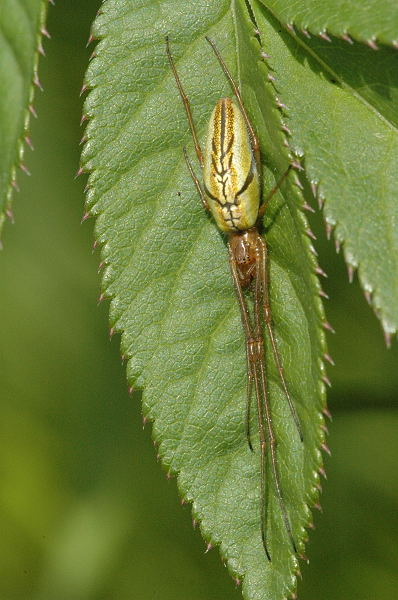
- female T. extensa

Scientific classification
- Kingdom: Animalia
- Phylum: Arthropoda
- Subphylum: Chelicerata
- Class: Arachnida
- Order: Araneae
- Infraorder: Araneomorphae
- Family: Tetragnathidae
- Genus: Tetragnatha; Latreille, 1804

Type species
- T. extensa (Linnaeus, 1758)

Species
- > 300, see text

= Tetragnatha =

Tetragnatha Temporal range: Palaeogene– Present

Genus of spiders

Tetragnatha is a genus of long-jawed orb-weavers found all over the world. It was first described by Pierre André Latreille in 1804, and contains hundreds of species. Most occur in the tropics and subtropics, and many can run over water. They are commonly called stretch spiders in reference to their elongated body form and their ability to hide on blades of grass or similar elongated substrates by stretching their front legs forward and the others behind them.

== Distribution ==
Species in this genus are found worldwide, including Greenland.

== Habitat and ecology ==
Pair of silver long-jawed orb weaver spiders

Tetragnatha species occupy the tall herb and tree layer. They construct orb webs, usually in vegetation near or above streams and ponds. Several studies have reported that they build their webs near slow-flowing streams in sunlit areas. Without access to a humid habitat, these spiders suffer from dehydration. The webs are short-lived, being taken down and digested daily or even more frequently. Webs are usually horizontally inclined and consist of an open hub with 30 to 40 viscid spirals. The spider hangs underneath the central hub of the web with its long front legs directed forward.

These spiders are capable of walking over water surfaces at a very fast pace, with legs I and II moving alternately in a diagonal rhythm while legs III and IV are dragged behind. When at rest on vegetation, the body is pressed against the substrate with the long front legs stretched forward.

One of the biggest and most common species is T. extensa, which has a holarctic distribution. It can be found near lakes, river banks or swamps. Large numbers of individuals can often be found in reeds, tall grass, and around minor trees and shrubs.

== Cursorial species found on Hawaiian archipelago ==
Evolution to cursorial behavior occurred long ago in a few different species, the most studied being those found on the Hawaiian islands.

The Tetragnatha spiders found on the Hawaiian archipelago are believed to have no more than three colonization events, two from web building species and one from cursorial species. This is because a species of mainland Tetragnatha spider was found to be more closely related to web building spiders on the Hawaiian islands than the cursorial species. This means that the divergence of web building and cursorial spiders must have occurred off the islands. There have been many events of cursorial evolution in various spider species around the world, including a few Tetragnatha species, although many species have not been thoroughly studied. The factors leading to this change of behavior is not well understood, although study of the Hawaiian Tetragnatha species can lead to some suggestions. Environmental factors, such as landscape and prey diversity play an important role in influencing the structure of webs in web building spiders. This could be a reasonable explanation for the loss of web function and evolving to a cursorial behavior.

=== Morphology ===
Eye arrangement of Tetragnatha

The general coloration ranges from fawn to dull brown or grey with silvery markings. The carapace is longer than wide, and the sternum is longer than wide with a pointed posterior end. Eight eyes are arranged in two rows, with lateral eyes slightly apart.

The chelicerae are notably variable, being long and well developed, featuring rows of large teeth and strong projecting spurs that are markedly elongated in males. The endites are parallel. The legs bear three claws and are long and slender, with or without spines.

The abdomen is elongated and cylindrical in some species, extending posteriorly beyond the spinnerets. The spinnerets are unmodified, with anterior and posterior pairs similar in size.

In females, the epigyne has genital openings located at the posterior end of the procurved epigastric furrow, with the genital plate not sclerotized. Males possess a separate and movable paracymbium with a coiled embolus and conductor at the distal tip.

== Species distinction ==
Tetragnatha species are hard to separate from each other without a microscope to scrutinize the genitalia of a mature individual. Hawaiian Tetragnatha appear to distinguish each other via highly specific chemical compounds in their silk. These chemical differences are especially prominent amongst sympatric and closely related species. This may constitute a form of chemical species recognition.

== Name ==
The name Tetragnatha is derived from Greek, tetra- a numerical prefix referring to four and gnatha meaning jaw.

== Species ==
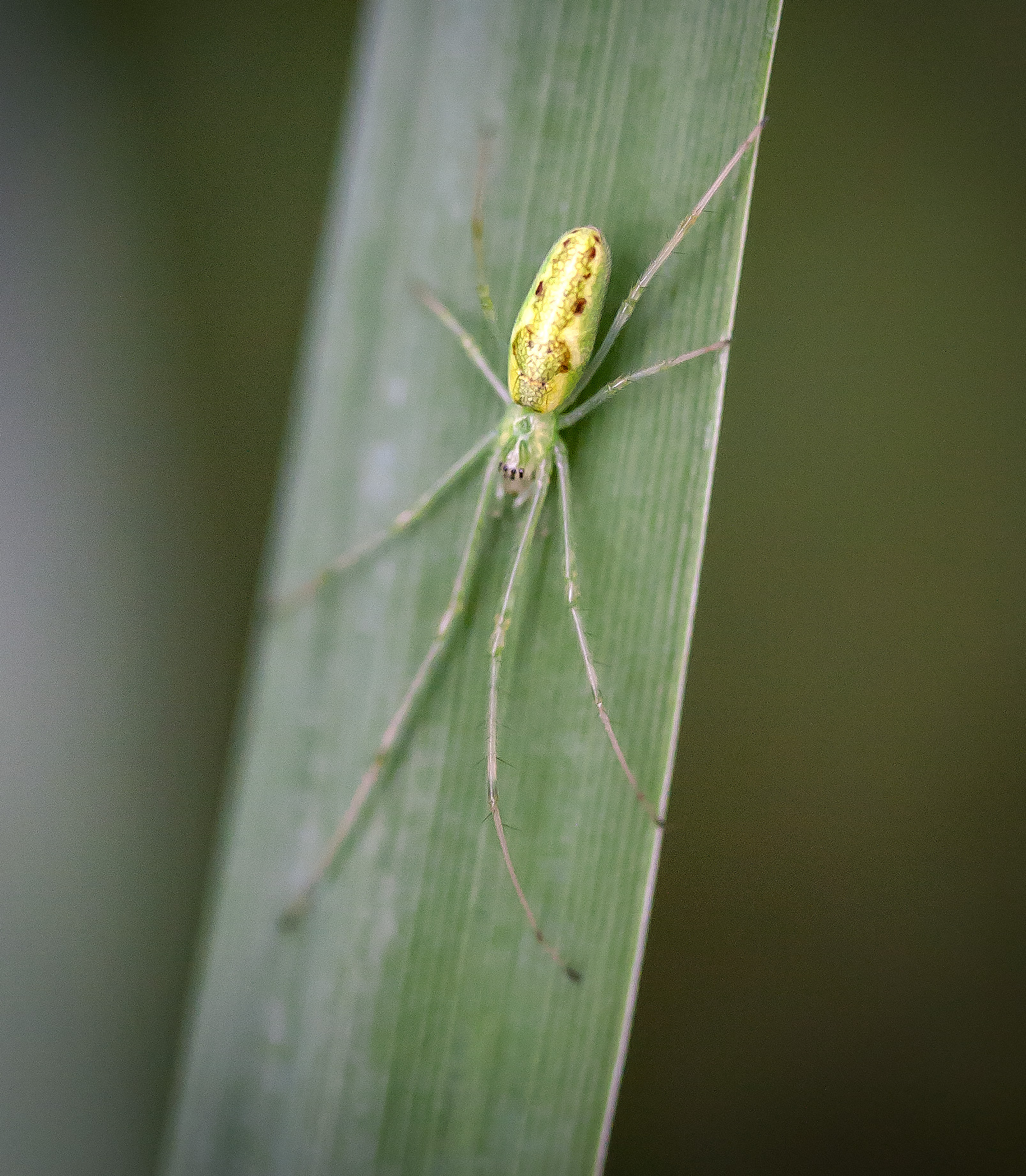
Tetragnatha sp.

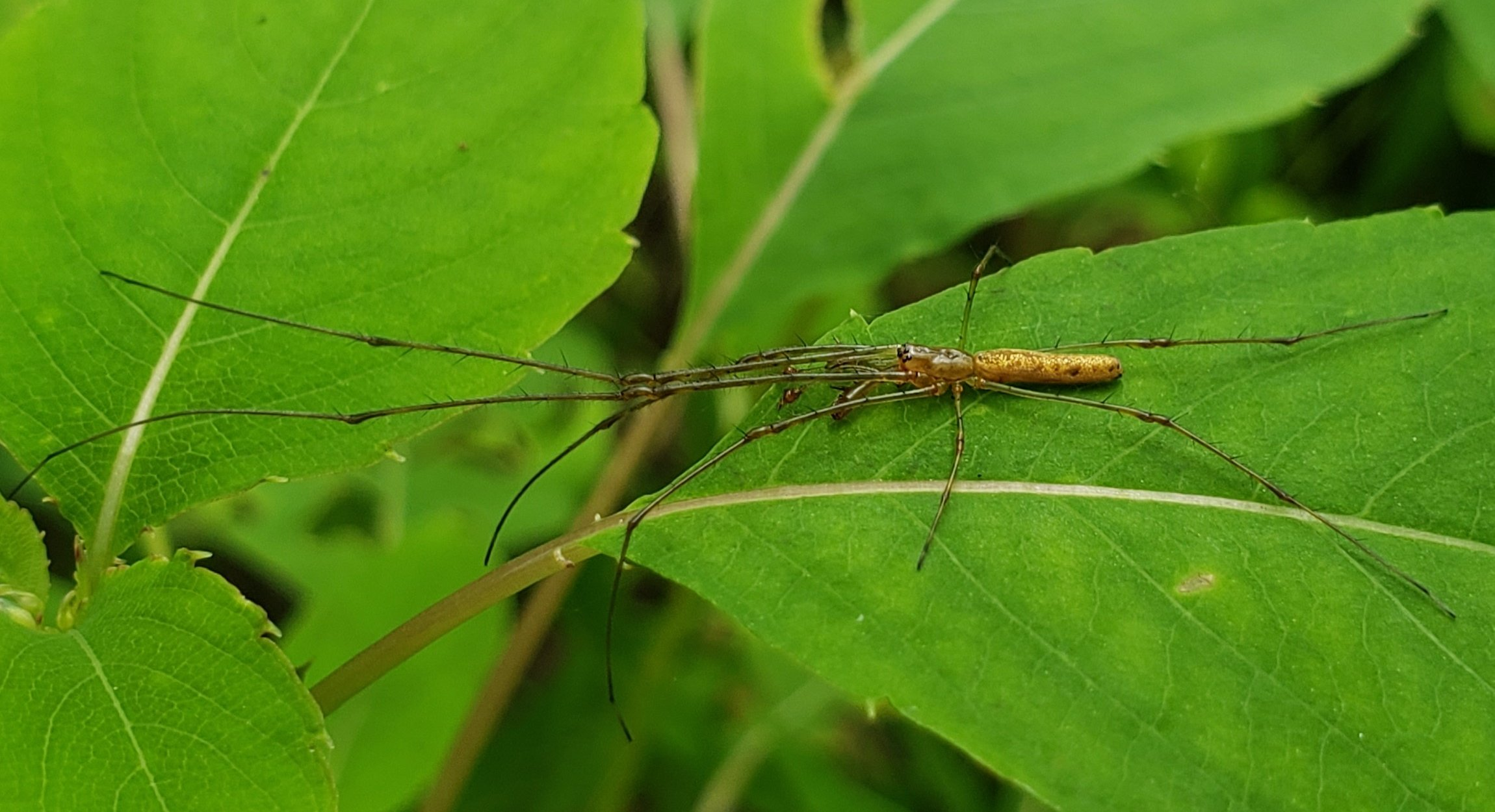
resting on Impatiens

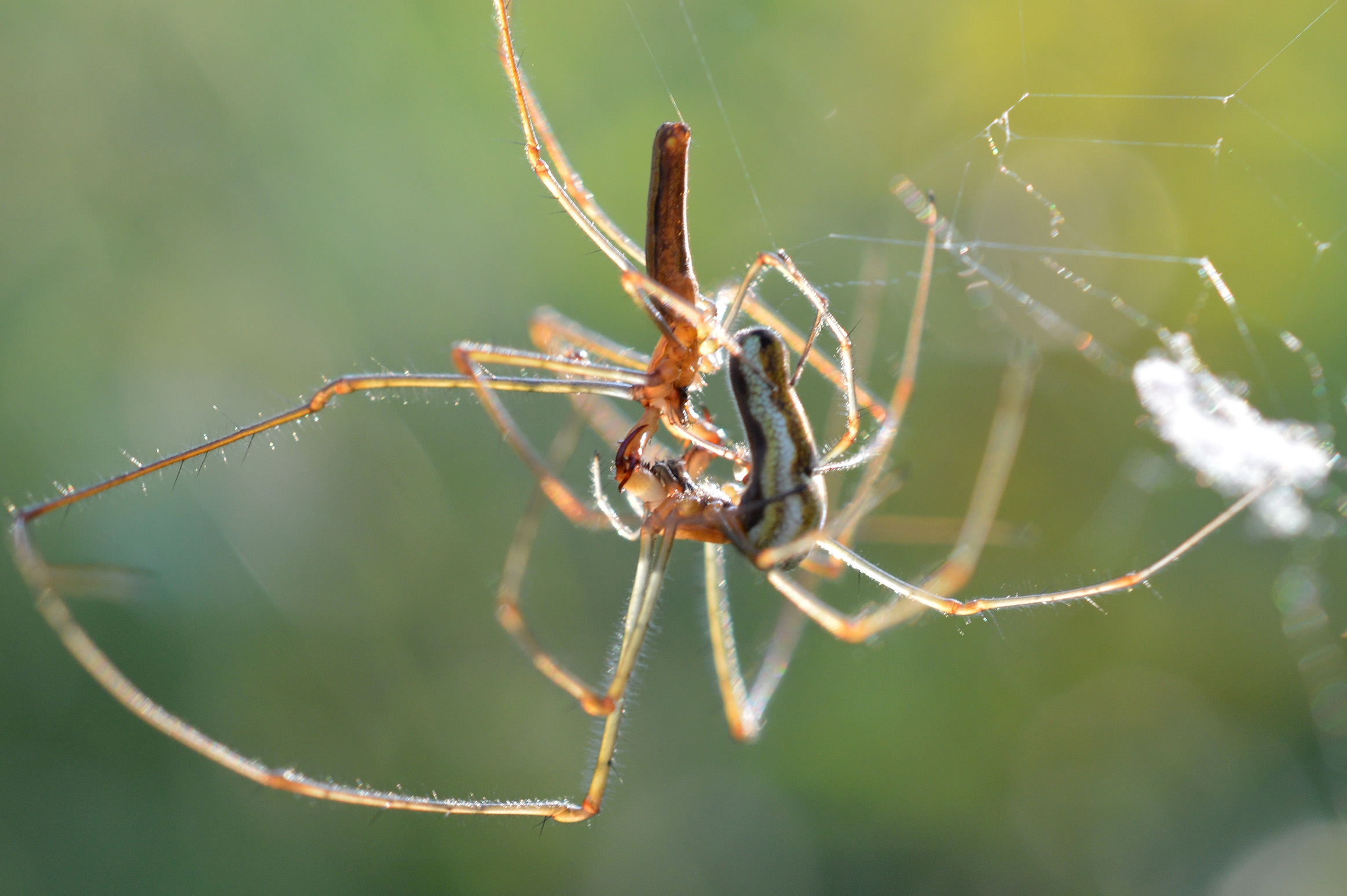
mating

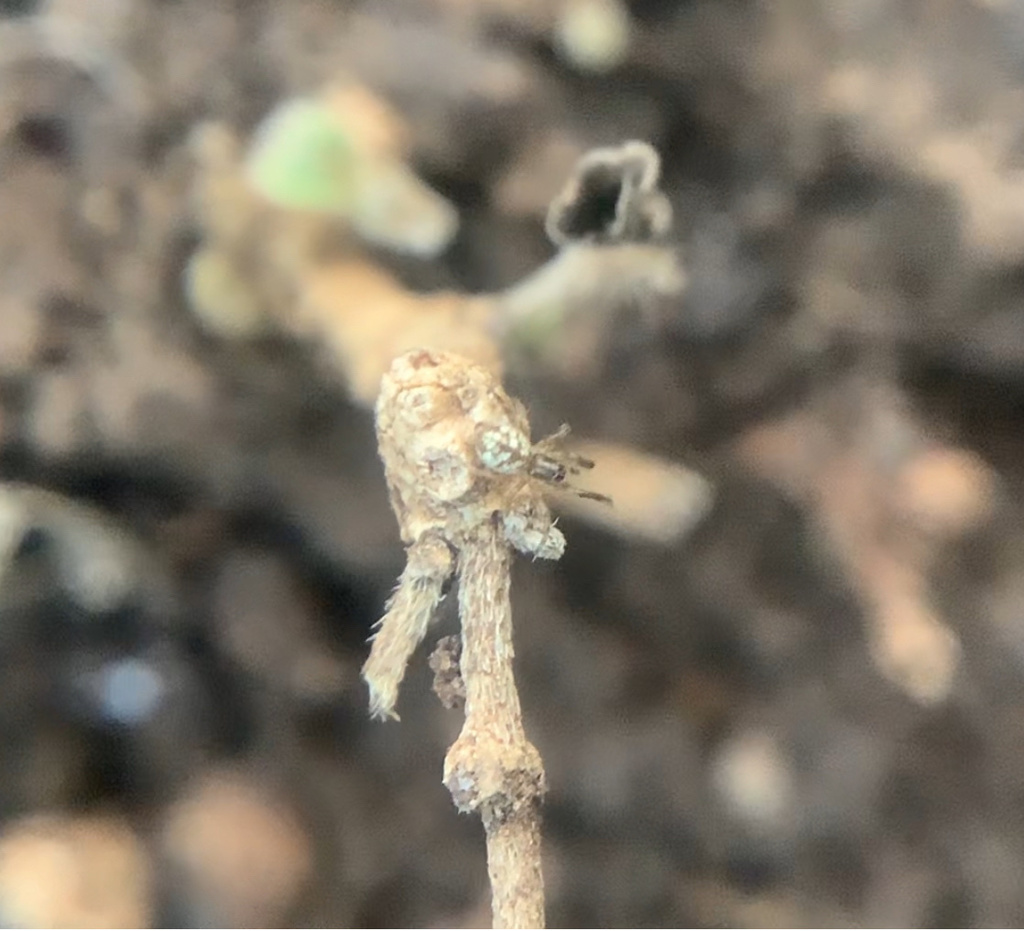

As of October 2025, this genus includes 309 species and nine subspecies.

Species with articles on Wikipedia:

- Tetragnatha armata Karsch, 1892 – Sri Lanka
- Tetragnatha bogotensis Keyserling, 1865 – Mexico to Paraguay, Caribbean. Introduced to Spain, Italy (Sardinia), Africa, Seychelles, Yemen, India, Nepal, Bangladesh, China
- Tetragnatha caffra (Strand, 1909) – South Africa
- Tetragnatha caudata Emerton, 1884 – North, Central America, Cuba, Jamaica, Uruguay, Argentina
- Tetragnatha ceylonica O. Pickard-Cambridge, 1869 – Mozambique, South Africa, Seychelles, India, Thailand, Philippines, New Guinea, Japan (Ryukyu Is.)
- Tetragnatha demissa L. Koch, 1872 – Australia. Introduced to Cyprus, Tanzania, South Africa, Seychelles, Tonga
- Tetragnatha determinata Karsch, 1892 – Sri Lanka
- Tetragnatha elongata Walckenaer, 1841 – Canada to Argentina, Caribbean
- Tetragnatha extensa (Linnaeus, 1758) – North America, Greenland, Europe, Turkey, Caucasus, Russia (Europe to Far East), Iraq, Iran, Kazakhstan, Central Asia, China, Korea, Japan (type species)
- Tetragnatha flavida Urquhart, 1891 – New Zealand
- Tetragnatha foveata Karsch, 1892 – Sri Lanka, Laccadive Is. Maldive Is.
- Tetragnatha geniculata Karsch, 1892 – India, Sri Lanka, China, Myanmar, Thailand, Vietnam
- Tetragnatha guatemalensis O. Pickard-Cambridge, 1889 – North and Central America, Cuba, Jamaica, Brazil, Paraguay
- Tetragnatha hasselti Thorell, 1890 – India to China, Indonesia (Sulawesi)
- Tetragnatha isidis (Simon, 1880) – Southern Europe, Libya, Egypt, Sudan, Uganda, South Africa, Iran, India
- Tetragnatha jaculator Tullgren, 1910 – Africa to China and India, New Guinea (Indonesia, Papua New Guinea). Introduced to the Caribbean and South America
- Tetragnatha keyserlingi Simon, 1890 – Central America, Caribbean, Brazil, Africa, Korea, China, India to Philippines, New Hebrides, Polynesia
- Tetragnatha laboriosa Hentz, 1850 – Alaska to Chile, Argentina, Falkland Is.
- Tetragnatha mandibulata Walckenaer, 1841 – Central America, Caribbean, Colombia, Guyana, Brazil, West Africa, India to Philippines, Australia
- Tetragnatha montana Simon, 1874 – Europe, Turkey, Caucasus, Russia (Europe to Far East), Kazakhstan, Iran, Central Asia
- Tetragnatha multipunctata Urquhart, 1891 – New Zealand
- Tetragnatha nigricans Dalmas, 1917 – New Zealand
- Tetragnatha nitens (Audouin, 1826) – Tropical and subtropical Asia. Introduced to Americas, Macaronesia, Mediterranean, St. Helena, South Africa, Madagascar, Pacific Is. New Zealand
- Tetragnatha pallescens F. O. Pickard-Cambridge, 1903 – North, Central America, Caribbean
- Tetragnatha planata Karsch, 1892 – Sri Lanka
- Tetragnatha praedonia L. Koch, 1878 – Russia (Far East), Korea, Japan, China, Taiwan, Laos
- Tetragnatha squamata Karsch, 1879 – India, China, Taiwan, Russia (Far East), Korea, Japan
- Tetragnatha straminea Emerton, 1884 – Canada, United States, Cuba
- Tetragnatha subsquamata Okuma, 1985 – Tanzania, South Africa
- Tetragnatha taylori O. Pickard-Cambridge, 1891 – South Africa
- Tetragnatha tenera Thorell, 1881 – Sri Lanka, Australia (Queensland)
- Tetragnatha torrensis Schmidt & Piepho, 1994 – Cape Verde
- Tetragnatha unicornis Tullgren, 1910 – Tanzania, Botswana, South Africa
- Tetragnatha vermiformis Emerton, 1884 – Temperate and tropical Asia. Introduced to North and Central America, Brazil, South Africa
- Tetragnatha versicolor Walckenaer, 1841 – North, Central America, Cuba
- Tetragnatha virescens Okuma, 1979 – Bangladesh, Sri Lanka to Indonesia, Philippines
- Tetragnatha viridis Walckenaer, 1841 – Canada, United States
- Tetragnatha yesoensis Saito, 1934 – Russia (Far East), China, Korea, Japan

List of all described species
- Tetragnatha acuta Gillespie, 1992 – Hawaii
- Tetragnatha aenea Cantor, 1842 – China
- Tetragnatha aetherea (Simon, 1895) – Venezuela
- Tetragnatha albida Gillespie, 1994 – Hawaii
- Tetragnatha amazonica Castanheira, Baptista & Oliveira, 2022 – Venezuela
- Tetragnatha amoena Okuma, 1987 – New Guinea
- Tetragnatha anamitica Walckenaer, 1841 – Vietnam
- Tetragnatha andamanensis Tikader, 1977 – India (Andaman Is.), Bangladesh
- Tetragnatha andonea Lawrence, 1927 – Namibia
- Tetragnatha angolaensis Okuma & Dippenaar-Schoeman, 1988 – Angola
- Tetragnatha anguilla Thorell, 1877 – Indonesia (Java, Sulawesi), New Guinea, Australia
- Tetragnatha angulata Hogg, 1914 – Australia (Western Australia)
- Tetragnatha anuenue Gillespie, 2002 – Hawaii
- Tetragnatha argentinensis Mello-Leitão, 1931 – Brazil, Uruguay, Argentina
- Tetragnatha armata Karsch, 1892 – Sri Lanka
- Tetragnatha atriceps Banks, 1898 – Mexico
- Tetragnatha atristernis Strand, 1913 – Central Africa
- Tetragnatha baculiferens Hingston, 1927 – Myanmar
- Tetragnatha beccarii Caporiacco, 1947 – Guyana
- Tetragnatha bengalensis Walckenaer, 1841 – India
- Tetragnatha bicolor White, 1841 – Australia (Tasmania)
- Tetragnatha bifurcata Li & Liu, 2022 – China
- Tetragnatha bimaculata Li & Liu, 2022 – China
- Tetragnatha biseriata Thorell, 1881 – New Guinea (Indonesia, Papua New Guinea), Australia (Queensland)
- Tetragnatha bituberculata L. Koch, 1867 – Japan, New Guinea, Australia
- Tetragnatha boeleni Chrysanthus, 1975 – New Guinea
- Tetragnatha bogotensis Keyserling, 1865 – Mexico to Paraguay, Caribbean. Introduced to Spain, Italy (Sardinia), Africa, Seychelles, Yemen, India, Nepal, Bangladesh, China
- Tetragnatha boninensis Okuma, 1981 – Japan
- Tetragnatha brachychelis Caporiacco, 1947 – Tanzania, Kenya
- Tetragnatha branda Levi, 1981 – United States
- Tetragnatha brevignatha Gillespie, 1992 – Hawaii
- Tetragnatha bryantae Roewer, 1951 – Puerto Rico
- Tetragnatha caffra (Strand, 1909) – South Africa
- Tetragnatha cambridgei Roewer, 1942 – Mexico, Central America, Puerto Rico
- Tetragnatha caudata Emerton, 1884 – North, Central America, Cuba, Jamaica, Uruguay, Argentina
- Tetragnatha caudicula (Karsch, 1879) – Russia (Far East), China, Korea, Taiwan, Japan, Mexico
- Tetragnatha caudifera (Keyserling, 1887) – Australia (New South Wales)
- Tetragnatha cavaleriei Schenkel, 1963 – China
- Tetragnatha cephalothoracis Strand, 1906 – Ethiopia
- Tetragnatha ceylonica O. Pickard-Cambridge, 1869 – Mozambique, South Africa, Seychelles, India, Thailand, Philippines, New Guinea, Japan (Ryukyu Is.)
- Tetragnatha chauliodus (Thorell, 1890) – China, Japan, Myanmar to Papua New Guinea, Brazil (introduced?)
- Tetragnatha cheni Zhu, Song & Zhang, 2003 – China
- Tetragnatha chinensis (Chamberlin, 1924) – China
- Tetragnatha chiyokoae Castanheira & Baptista, 2020 – China, Taiwan, Japan
- Tetragnatha cladognatha Bertkau, 1880 – Brazil, Argentina
- Tetragnatha clavigera Simon, 1887 – Sierra Leone, Ivory Coast, DR Congo
- Tetragnatha cochinensis Gravely, 1921 – India
- Tetragnatha coelestis Pocock, 1901 – India
- Tetragnatha cognata O. Pickard-Cambridge, 1889 – Guatemala to Panama
- Tetragnatha conica Grube, 1861 – Russia (Far East)
- Tetragnatha corsica Simon, 1929 – France (Corsica)
- Tetragnatha crassichelata Chrysanthus, 1975 – New Guinea
- Tetragnatha cristata Castanheira, Baptista & Oliveira, 2022 – Brazil, Argentina
- Tetragnatha cuneiventris Simon, 1900 – Hawaii
- Tetragnatha cylindracea (Keyserling, 1887) – Australia (Queensland, New South Wales)
- Tetragnatha cylindrica Walckenaer, 1841 – New Guinea, Australia, Fiji
- Tetragnatha cylindriformis Lawrence, 1952 – Congo
- Tetragnatha dearmata Thorell, 1873 – North America, Europe, Caucasus, Russia (Europe to Far East)
- Tetragnatha delumbis Thorell, 1891 – India (Nicobar Is.)
- Tetragnatha demissa L. Koch, 1872 – Australia. Introduced to Cyprus, Tanzania, South Africa, Seychelles, Tonga
- Tetragnatha dentatidens Simon, 1907 – Sierra Leone, Congo
- Tetragnatha desaguni Barrion & Litsinger, 1995 – Philippines
- Tetragnatha determinata Karsch, 1892 – Sri Lanka
- Tetragnatha didorata Castanheira, Baptista & Oliveira, 2022 – Brazil
- Tetragnatha digitata O. Pickard-Cambridge, 1899 – Mexico, Costa Rica
- Tetragnatha earmra Levi, 1981 – United States, Antigua, Martinique
- Tetragnatha eberhardi Okuma, 1992 – Panama
- Tetragnatha elongata Walckenaer, 1841 – Canada to Argentina, Caribbean
  - T. e. debilis Thorell, 1877 – United States
  - T. e. principalis Thorell, 1877 – United States
  - T. e. undulata Thorell, 1877 – United States
- Tetragnatha elyunquensis Petrunkevitch, 1930 – Jamaica, Puerto Rico
- Tetragnatha esakii Okuma, 1988 – Taiwan
- Tetragnatha eumorpha Okuma, 1987 – New Guinea
- Tetragnatha eurychasma Gillespie, 1992 – Hawaii
- Tetragnatha exigua Chickering, 1957 – Jamaica
- Tetragnatha exquista Saito, 1933 – Japan
- Tetragnatha extensa (Linnaeus, 1758) – North America, Greenland, Europe, Turkey, Caucasus, Russia (Europe to Far East), Iraq, Iran, Kazakhstan, Central Asia, China, Korea, Japan (type species)
  - T. e. brachygnatha Thorell, 1873 – Sweden, Russia (Kamchatka)
  - T. e. maracandica Charitonov, 1951 – Iran, Central Asia
  - T. e. pulchra Kulczyński, 1891 – Hungary
- Tetragnatha fallax Thorell, 1881 – Indonesia
- Tetragnatha farri Chickering, 1962 – Jamaica
- Tetragnatha filiciphilia Gillespie, 1992 – Hawaii
- Tetragnatha filipes Schenkel, 1936 – China
- Tetragnatha filum Simon, 1907 – Congo, Equatorial Guinea (Bioko), São Tomé and Príncipe
- Tetragnatha flagellans van Hasselt, 1882 – Indonesia (Sumatra)
- Tetragnatha flava (Audouin, 1826) – Egypt
- Tetragnatha flavida Urquhart, 1891 – New Zealand
- Tetragnatha fletcheri Gravely, 1921 – India, Bangladesh
- Tetragnatha foai Simon, 1902 – Central, East Africa
- Tetragnatha foliferens Hingston, 1927 – India (Nicobar Is.)
- Tetragnatha foveata Karsch, 1892 – Sri Lanka, Laccadive Is. Maldive Is.
- Tetragnatha fragilis Chickering, 1957 – Panama
- Tetragnatha franganilloi Brignoli, 1983 – Cuba
- Tetragnatha friedericii Strand, 1913 – New Guinea
- Tetragnatha gemmata L. Koch, 1872 – Australia (Queensland)
- Tetragnatha geniculata Karsch, 1892 – India, Sri Lanka, China, Myanmar, Thailand, Vietnam
- Tetragnatha gertschi Chickering, 1957 – Panama
- Tetragnatha gibbula Roewer, 1942 – French Guiana
- Tetragnatha gongshan Zhao & Peng, 2010 – China
- Tetragnatha gracillima (Thorell, 1890) – Indonesia (Sumatra)
- Tetragnatha granti Pocock, 1903 – Yemen (Socotra)
- Tetragnatha gressitti Okuma, 1988 – Borneo
- Tetragnatha gressittorum Okuma, 1987 – New Guinea
- Tetragnatha guatemalensis O. Pickard-Cambridge, 1889 – North and Central America, Cuba, Jamaica, Brazil, Paraguay
- Tetragnatha gui Zhu, Song & Zhang, 2003 – China (Hainan)
- Tetragnatha hamata Thorell, 1898 – Myanmar
- Tetragnatha hasselti Thorell, 1890 – India to China, Indonesia (Sulawesi)
  - T. h. birmanica Sherriffs, 1919 – Myanmar
- Tetragnatha hastula Simon, 1907 – Sierra Leone, Gabon, São Tomé and Príncipe
- Tetragnatha hawaiensis Simon, 1900 – Hawaii
- Tetragnatha heongi Barrion & Barrion-Dupo, 2011 – China
- Tetragnatha hirashimai Okuma, 1987 – New Guinea
- Tetragnatha hiroshii Okuma, 1988 – Taiwan
- Tetragnatha hulli Caporiacco, 1955 – Venezuela
- Tetragnatha insularis Okuma, 1987 – Australia (Lord Howe Is.)
- Tetragnatha insulicola Okuma, 1987 – Australia (Lord Howe Is.)
- Tetragnatha intermedia Kulczyński, 1891 – Madeira, Portugal to Turkey
- Tetragnatha iriomotensis Okuma, 1991 – Japan (Okinawa)
- Tetragnatha irridescens Stoliczka, 1869 – India
- Tetragnatha isidis (Simon, 1880) – Southern Europe, Libya, Egypt, Sudan, Uganda, South Africa, Iran, India
- Tetragnatha iwahigensis Barrion & Litsinger, 1995 – Philippines
- Tetragnatha jaculator Tullgren, 1910 – Africa to China and India, New Guinea (Indonesia, Papua New Guinea). Introduced to the Caribbean and South America
- Tetragnatha javana (Thorell, 1890) – Africa, Asia
- Tetragnatha jejuna (Thorell, 1897) – Myanmar
- Tetragnatha josephi Okuma, 1988 – India, Malaysia, Singapore
- Tetragnatha jubensis Pavesi, 1895 – Ethiopia
- Tetragnatha kamakou Gillespie, 1992 – Hawaii
- Tetragnatha kapua Gillespie, 2003 – Marquesas Is.
- Tetragnatha kauaiensis Simon, 1900 – Hawaii
- Tetragnatha kea Gillespie, 1994 – Hawaii
- Tetragnatha keyserlingi Simon, 1890 – Central America, Caribbean, Brazil, Africa, Korea, China, India to Philippines, New Hebrides, Polynesia
- Tetragnatha khanjahani Biswas & Raychaudhuri, 1996 – Bangladesh
- Tetragnatha kikokiko Gillespie, 2002 – Hawaii
- Tetragnatha kiwuana Strand, 1913 – Central Africa
- Tetragnatha klossi Hogg, 1919 – Indonesia (Sumatra)
- Tetragnatha kolosvaryi Caporiacco, 1949 – Kenya
- Tetragnatha kukuhaa Gillespie, 2002 – Hawaii
- Tetragnatha kukuiki Gillespie, 2002 – Hawaii
- Tetragnatha laboriosa Hentz, 1850 – Alaska to Chile, Argentina, Falkland Is.
- Tetragnatha laminalis Strand, 1907 – East Africa
- Tetragnatha lancinans Kulczyński, 1911 – New Guinea
- Tetragnatha laqueata L. Koch, 1872 – Korea, Japan, (Ogasawara Is.)
- Tetragnatha latro Tullgren, 1910 – East Africa
- Tetragnatha lauta Yaginuma, 1959 – India, China, Taiwan, Japan, Korea, Laos
- Tetragnatha lea Bösenberg & Strand, 1906 – Russia (Far East), Japan, Korea?
- Tetragnatha lena Gillespie, 2003 – Hawaii
- Tetragnatha lepida Rainbow, 1916 – Australia (Queensland)
- Tetragnatha levii Okuma, 1992 – Mexico
- Tetragnatha limu Gillespie, 2003 – Hawaii
- Tetragnatha lineatula Roewer, 1942 – Malaysia
- Tetragnatha linyphioides Karsch, 1878 – Mozambique
- Tetragnatha llavaca Barrion & Litsinger, 1995 – Philippines
- Tetragnatha luculenta Simon, 1907 – Guinea-Bissau
- Tetragnatha luteocincta Simon, 1908 – Australia (Western Australia)
- Tetragnatha mabelae Chickering, 1957 – Panama, Trinidad
- Tetragnatha macilenta L. Koch, 1872 – Australia, (Norfolk Is.) to French Polynesia (Society Is.)
- Tetragnatha macracantha Gillespie, 1992 – Hawaii
- Tetragnatha macrops Simon, 1907 – São Tomé and Príncipe
- Tetragnatha maculata Blackwall, 1865 – Cape Verde
- Tetragnatha maeandrata Simon, 1908 – Australia (Western Australia)
- Tetragnatha maka Gillespie, 1994 – Hawaii
- Tetragnatha makiharai Okuma, 1977 – Russia (Far East), Japan (mainland, Ryukyu Is.)
- Tetragnatha mandibulata Walckenaer, 1841 – Central America, Caribbean, Colombia, Guyana, Brazil, West Africa, India to Philippines, Australia
- Tetragnatha maralba Roberts, 1983 – Seychelles (Aldabra)
- Tetragnatha margaritata L. Koch, 1872 – Australia (Queensland)
- Tetragnatha marginata (Thorell, 1890) – Myanmar to New Caledonia
- Tetragnatha marquesiana Berland, 1935 – Marquesas Is.
- Tetragnatha martinicensis Dierkens, 2011 – Martinique
- Tetragnatha mawambina Strand, 1913 – Central Africa
- Tetragnatha megalocera Castanheira & Baptista, 2020 – Brazil
- Tetragnatha mengsongica Zhu, Song & Zhang, 2003 – China
- Tetragnatha mertoni Strand, 1911 – Indonesia (Aru Is.)
- Tetragnatha mexicana Keyserling, 1865 – Mexico to Panama
- Tetragnatha micrura Kulczyński, 1911 – New Guinea, Solomon Islands
- Tetragnatha minitabunda O. Pickard-Cambridge, 1872 – Syria, Lebanon, Israel
- Tetragnatha modica Kulczyński, 1911 – New Guinea
- Tetragnatha mohihi Gillespie, 1992 – Hawaii
- Tetragnatha montana Simon, 1874 – Europe, Turkey, Caucasus, Russia (Europe to Far East), Kazakhstan, Iran, Central Asia
  - T. m. timorensis Schenkel, 1944 – Timor
- Tetragnatha monticola Okuma, 1987 – New Guinea
- Tetragnatha moua Gillespie, 2003 – Tahiti
- Tetragnatha moulmeinensis Gravely, 1921 – Myanmar
- Tetragnatha multipunctata Urquhart, 1891 – New Zealand
- Tetragnatha nana Okuma, 1987 – New Guinea
- Tetragnatha nandan Zhu, Song & Zhang, 2003 – China
- Tetragnatha nepaeformis Doleschall, 1859 – Indonesia (Java)
- Tetragnatha nero Butler, 1876 – Mauritius (Rodriguez)
- Tetragnatha netrix Simon, 1900 – Hawaii
- Tetragnatha nigricans Dalmas, 1917 – New Zealand
- Tetragnatha nigrigularis Simon, 1898 – Seychelles
- Tetragnatha nigrita Lendl, 1886 – Europe, Caucasus, Russia (Europe to Far East), Kazakhstan, Iran, Central Asia, China, Japan
- Tetragnatha niokolona Roewer, 1961 – Senegal
- Tetragnatha nitens (Audouin, 1826) – Tropical and subtropical Asia. Introduced to Americas, Macaronesia, Mediterranean, St. Helena, South Africa, Madagascar, Pacific Is. New Zealand
- Tetragnatha nitidiuscula Simon, 1907 – West Africa
- Tetragnatha nitidiventris Simon, 1907 – Guinea-Bissau
- Tetragnatha notophilla Boeris, 1889 – Peru
- Tetragnatha noumeensis Berland, 1924 – New Caledonia
- Tetragnatha novia Simon, 1901 – Malaysia
- Tetragnatha nubica Denis, 1955 – Niger
- Tetragnatha obscura Gillespie, 2002 – Hawaii
- Tetragnatha obscuriceps Caporiacco, 1940 – Ethiopia
- Tetragnatha obtusa C. L. Koch, 1837 – Europe, Turkey, Caucasus, Russia (Europe to Far East), Kazakhstan, Iran, Central Asia
- Tetragnatha oculata Denis, 1955 – Niger
- Tetragnatha okumae Barrion & Litsinger, 1995 – Philippines
- Tetragnatha olindana Karsch, 1880 – Polynesia
- Tetragnatha oncognatha Castanheira, Baptista & Oliveira, 2022 – Brazil
- Tetragnatha oomua Gillespie, 2003 – Marquesas Is.
- Tetragnatha oreobia Okuma, 1987 – New Guinea
- Tetragnatha orizaba (Banks, 1898) – Mexico, Cuba, Jamaica
- Tetragnatha oubatchensis Berland, 1924 – New Caledonia
- Tetragnatha palikea Gillespie, 2003 – Hawaii
- Tetragnatha pallescens F. O. Pickard-Cambridge, 1903 – North, Central America, Caribbean
- Tetragnatha pallida O. Pickard-Cambridge, 1889 – Costa Rica, Panama
- Tetragnatha paludicola Gillespie, 1992 – Hawaii
- Tetragnatha paludis Caporiacco, 1940 – Ethiopia
- Tetragnatha panopea L. Koch, 1872 – Macronesia, Polynesia, Hawaii
- Tetragnatha papuana Kulczyński, 1911 – New Guinea
- Tetragnatha paradisea Pocock, 1901 – India
- Tetragnatha paradoxa Okuma, 1992 – Costa Rica
- Tetragnatha paraguayensis (Mello-Leitão, 1939) – Brazil, Paraguay, Argentina
- Tetragnatha parvula Thorell, 1891 – India (Nicobar Is.)
- Tetragnatha paschae Berland, 1924 – Easter Is.
- Tetragnatha perkinsi Simon, 1900 – Hawaii
- Tetragnatha perreirai Gillespie, 1992 – Hawaii
- Tetragnatha phaeodactyla Kulczyński, 1911 – New Guinea
- Tetragnatha pilosa Gillespie, 1992 – Hawaii
- Tetragnatha pinicola L. Koch, 1870 – Europe, Turkey, Caucasus, Russia (Europe to Far East), Kazakhstan, Iran, Central Asia, China, Korea, Japan
- Tetragnatha piscatoria Simon, 1898 – Caribbean
- Tetragnatha planata Karsch, 1892 – Sri Lanka
- Tetragnatha plena Chamberlin, 1924 – China
- Tetragnatha polychromata Gillespie, 1992 – Hawaii
- Tetragnatha pradoi Castanheira, Baptista & Oliveira, 2022 – Brazil, Argentina
- Tetragnatha praedonia L. Koch, 1878 – Russia (Far East), Korea, Japan, China, Taiwan, Laos
- Tetragnatha priamus Okuma, 1987 – Solomon Islands
- Tetragnatha protensa Walckenaer, 1841 – Madagascar to Australia, New Caledonia, Palau Is.
- Tetragnatha puella Thorell, 1895 – Myanmar, Indonesia (Sumatra), New Guinea
- Tetragnatha pulchella Thorell, 1877 – Indonesia
- Tetragnatha punua Gillespie, 2003 – Marquesas Is.
- Tetragnatha quadrinotata Urquhart, 1893 – Australia (Tasmania)
- Tetragnatha quasimodo Gillespie, 1992 – Hawaii
- Tetragnatha quechua Chamberlin, 1916 – Peru
- Tetragnatha radiata Chrysanthus, 1975 – New Guinea
- Tetragnatha rava Gillespie, 2003 – Tahiti
- Tetragnatha reimoseri (Roșca, 1939) – France to Poland and Bulgaria, Ukraine, Russia (Europe, Urals), Caucasus, Kazakhstan
- Tetragnatha renatoi Castanheira & Baptista, 2020 – Venezuela, Brazil, Argentina
- Tetragnatha reni Zhu, Song & Zhang, 2003 – China
- Tetragnatha restricta Simon, 1900 – Hawaii
- Tetragnatha retinens Chamberlin, 1924 – China
- Tetragnatha rimandoi Barrion, 1998 – Philippines
- Tetragnatha rimitarae Strand, 1911 – Polynesia
- Tetragnatha riveti Berland, 1913 – Ecuador
- Tetragnatha roeweri Caporiacco, 1949 – Kenya
- Tetragnatha rossi Chrysanthus, 1975 – New Guinea
- Tetragnatha rouxi (Berland, 1924) – New Caledonia
- Tetragnatha rubriventris Doleschall, 1857 – New Guinea, Australia (Queensland)
- Tetragnatha scopus Chamberlin, 1916 – Peru
- Tetragnatha serra Doleschall, 1857 – India, Thailand, China, Indonesia (Sumatra to New Guinea)
- Tetragnatha shinanoensis Okuma & Chikuni, 1978 – Korea, Japan
- Tetragnatha shoshone Levi, 1981 – Canada, United States, Europe, Russia (Europe, South Siberia), Kazakhstan, Iran, Mongolia, China
- Tetragnatha sidama Caporiacco, 1940 – Ethiopia
- Tetragnatha signata Okuma, 1987 – New Guinea
- Tetragnatha simintina Roewer, 1961 – Senegal
- Tetragnatha sinuosa Chickering, 1957 – Panama
- Tetragnatha sobrina Simon, 1900 – Hawaii
- Tetragnatha sociella Chamberlin, 1924 – China
- Tetragnatha squamata Karsch, 1879 – India, China, Taiwan, Russia (Far East), Korea, Japan
- Tetragnatha stelarobusta Gillespie, 1992 – Hawaii
- Tetragnatha stellarum Chrysanthus, 1975 – New Guinea
- Tetragnatha stimulifera Simon, 1907 – Congo
- Tetragnatha straminea Emerton, 1884 – Canada, United States, Cuba
- Tetragnatha strandi Lessert, 1915 – East, Southern Africa
  - T. s. melanogaster Schmidt & Krause, 1993 – Comoros
- Tetragnatha streichi Strand, 1907 – China
- Tetragnatha striata L. Koch, 1862 – Europe, Russia (Europe to South Siberia), Kazakhstan
- Tetragnatha subclavigera Strand, 1907 – Congo
- Tetragnatha subesakii Zhu, Song & Zhang, 2003 – China
- Tetragnatha subextensa Petrunkevitch, 1930 – Jamaica, Puerto Rico
- Tetragnatha subsquamata Okuma, 1985 – Tanzania, South Africa
- Tetragnatha suoan Zhu, Song & Zhang, 2003 – China
- Tetragnatha sutherlandi Gravely, 1921 – India
- Tetragnatha tahuata Gillespie, 2003 – Marquesas Is.
- Tetragnatha tanigawai Okuma, 1988 – Japan (Ryukyu Is.)
- Tetragnatha tantalus Gillespie, 1992 – Hawaii
- Tetragnatha taylori O. Pickard-Cambridge, 1891 – South Africa
- Tetragnatha tenera Thorell, 1881 – Sri Lanka, Australia (Queensland)
- Tetragnatha tenuis O. Pickard-Cambridge, 1889 – Guatemala to Panama
- Tetragnatha tenuissima O. Pickard-Cambridge, 1889 – Mexico, Central America, Caribbean to Brazil, Argentina
- Tetragnatha tincochacae Chamberlin, 1916 – Peru
- Tetragnatha tipula (Simon, 1894) – West Africa
- Tetragnatha tonkina Simon, 1909 – Vietnam
- Tetragnatha torrensis Schmidt & Piepho, 1994 – Cape Verde
- Tetragnatha tortilis Li & Liu, 2022 – China
- Tetragnatha trichodes Thorell, 1878 – Indonesia
- Tetragnatha tristani Banks, 1909 – Costa Rica
- Tetragnatha trituberculata Gillespie, 1992 – Hawaii
- Tetragnatha tuamoaa Gillespie, 2003 – Society Is.
- Tetragnatha tullgreni Lessert, 1915 – Central, East Africa
- Tetragnatha uluhe Gillespie, 2003 – Hawaii
- Tetragnatha uncifera Simon, 1900 – Hawaii
- Tetragnatha unicornis Tullgren, 1910 – Tanzania, Botswana, South Africa
- Tetragnatha vacillans (Butler, 1876) – Mauritius (Rodriguez)
- Tetragnatha valida Keyserling, 1887 – Australia (Queensland, New South Wales, Tasmania)
- Tetragnatha vermiformis Emerton, 1884 – Temperate and tropical Asia. Introduced to North and Central America, Brazil, South Africa
- Tetragnatha versicolor Walckenaer, 1841 – North, Central America, Cuba
- Tetragnatha virescens Okuma, 1979 – Bangladesh, Sri Lanka to Indonesia, Philippines
- Tetragnatha viridis Walckenaer, 1841 – Canada, United States
- Tetragnatha viridorufa Gravely, 1921 – India
- Tetragnatha visenda Chickering, 1957 – Jamaica
- Tetragnatha waikamoi Gillespie, 1992 – Hawaii
- Tetragnatha yalom Chrysanthus, 1975 – New Guinea, Papua new Guinea (Bismarck Arch.), Australia (Queensland)
- Tetragnatha yesoensis Saito, 1934 – Russia (Far East), China, Korea, Japan
- Tetragnatha yinae Zhao & Peng, 2010 – China
- Tetragnatha yongquiang Zhu, Song & Zhang, 2003 – China
- Tetragnatha zangherii (Caporiacco, 1926) – Italy
- Tetragnatha zhaoi Zhu, Song & Zhang, 2003 – China
- Tetragnatha zhaoya Zhu, Song & Zhang, 2003 – China

Synonyms
- T. aduncata Wang, 1991 = Tetragnatha hasselti Thorell, 1890
- T. alba F. O. Pickard-Cambridge, 1903 = Tetragnatha laboriosa Hentz, 1850
- T. amplidens Chamberlin & Ivie, 1936 = Tetragnatha elongata Walckenaer, 1841
- T. andina Taczanowski, 1878 = Tetragnatha bogotensis Keyserling, 1865
- T. anirensis Strand, 1915 = Tetragnatha biseriata Thorell, 1881
- T. antillana Simon, 1897 = Tetragnatha nitens (Audouin, 1826)
- T. apheles Chamberlin & Ivie, 1936 = Tetragnatha mexicana Keyserling, 1865
- T. aptans Chamberlin, 1920 = Tetragnatha nitens (Audouin, 1826)
- T. banksi McCook, 1894 = Tetragnatha guatemalensis O. Pickard-Cambridge, 1889
- T. bemalcuei Mello-Leitão, 1939 = Tetragnatha bogotensis Keyserling, 1865
- T. borealis L. Koch, 1879 = Tetragnatha dearmata Thorell, 1873
- T. boydi O. Pickard-Cambridge, 1898 = Tetragnatha bogotensis Keyserling, 1865
- T. boydi Tullgren, 1910 = Tetragnatha bogotensis Keyserling, 1865
- T. caporiaccoi Platnick, 1993 = Tetragnatha nitens (Audouin, 1826)
- T. casula Walckenaer, 1841 = Tetragnatha versicolor Walckenaer, 1841
- T. cliens Chamberlin, 1924 = Tetragnatha nigrita Lendl, 1886
- T. conformans Chamberlin, 1924 = Tetragnatha keyserlingi Simon, 1890
- T. confraterna Banks, 1909 = Tetragnatha mandibulata Walckenaer, 1841
- T. convexa Banks, 1898 = Tetragnatha versicolor Walckenaer, 1841
- T. coreana Seo & Paik, 1981 = Tetragnatha vermiformis Emerton, 1884
- T. culicivora Walckenaer, 1841 = Tetragnatha elongata Walckenaer, 1841
- T. decipiens Badcock, 1932 = Tetragnatha nitens (Audouin, 1826)
- T. dentigera F. O. Pickard-Cambridge, 1903 = Tetragnatha versicolor Walckenaer, 1841
- T. earmra Levi, 1981 = Tetragnatha gracilis (Bryant, 1923)
- T. eitapensis Strand, 1913 = Tetragnatha ceylonica O. Pickard-Cambridge, 1869
- T. elmora Chamberlin & Ivie, 1942 = Tetragnatha nitens (Audouin, 1826)
- T. ethodon Chamberlin & Ivie, 1936 = Tetragnatha keyserlingi Simon, 1890
- T. festina Bryant, 1945 = Tetragnatha nitens (Audouin, 1826)
- T. filiformis (Audouin, 1826) = Tetragnatha flava (Audouin, 1826)
- T. foliifera Simon, 1898 = Tetragnatha demissa L. Koch, 1872
- T. fraterna Banks, 1898 = Tetragnatha guatemalensis O. Pickard-Cambridge, 1889
- T. fuerteventurensis Wunderlich, 1992 = Tetragnatha nitens (Audouin, 1826)
- T. galapagoensis Banks, 1902 = Tetragnatha nitens (Audouin, 1826)
- T. graciliventris Schenkel, 1963 = Tetragnatha mandibulata Walckenaer, 1841
- T. grenda Roberts, 1983 = Tetragnatha demissa L. Koch, 1872
- T. groenlandica Thorell, 1872 = Tetragnatha extensa (Linnaeus, 1758)
- T. haitiensis Bryant, 1945 = Tetragnatha bogotensis Keyserling, 1865
- T. harrodi Levi, 1951 = Tetragnatha dearmata Thorell, 1873
- T. heatwolei Chrysanthus, 1975 = Tetragnatha bituberculata L. Koch, 1867
- T. hotingchiehi Schenkel, 1963 = Tetragnatha nitens (Audouin, 1826)
- T. huahinensis Berland, 1942 = Tetragnatha macilenta L. Koch, 1872
- T. infuscata Benoit, 1978 = Tetragnatha mandibulata Walckenaer, 1841
- T. intermedia Banks, 1898 = Tetragnatha guatemalensis O. Pickard-Cambridge, 1889
- T. japonica Bösenberg & Strand, 1906 = Tetragnatha keyserlingi Simon, 1890
- T. kaestneri (Crome, 1954) = Tetragnatha reimoseri (Rosca, 1939)
- T. kochi Thorell, 1895 = Tetragnatha keyserlingi Simon, 1890
- T. kovblyuki Marusik, 2010 = Tetragnatha shoshone Levi, 1981
- T. laudativa Gertsch & Mulaik, 1936 = Tetragnatha guatemalensis O. Pickard-Cambridge, 1889
- T. limnocharis Seeley, 1928 = Tetragnatha versicolor Walckenaer, 1841
- T. listeri Gravely, 1921 = Tetragnatha keyserlingi Simon, 1890
- T. mackenziei Gravely, 1921 = Tetragnatha vermiformis Emerton, 1884
- T. maderiana Schenkel, 1938 (described as subspecies of T. extensa) = Tetragnatha extensa (Linnaeus, 1758)
- T. mandibulata Gravely, 1921 = Tetragnatha bogotensis Keyserling, 1865
- T. manitoba Chamberlin & Ivie, 1942 = Tetragnatha extensa (Linnaeus, 1758)
- T. marianna Archer, 1940 = Tetragnatha versicolor Walckenaer, 1841
- T. maxillosa Thorell, 1895 = Tetragnatha keyserlingi Simon, 1890
- T. maxillosa Strand, 1911 = Tetragnatha keyserlingi Simon, 1890
- T. modesta Hirst, 1911 = Tetragnatha ceylonica O. Pickard-Cambridge, 1869
- T. munda Chamberlin & Gertsch, 1929 = Tetragnatha versicolor Walckenaer, 1841
- T. necatoria Tullgren, 1910 = Tetragnatha mandibulata Walckenaer, 1841
- T. nigrita Strand, 1906 = Tetragnatha praedonia L. Koch, 1878
- T. nitens (Hogg, 1911) = Tetragnatha nitens (Audouin, 1826)
- T. nitens Wiehle, 1962 = Tetragnatha bogotensis Keyserling, 1865
- T. numa Levi & Levi, 1955 = Tetragnatha laboriosa Hentz, 1850
- T. obtusa Kulczyński, 1891 = Tetragnatha dearmata Thorell, 1873
- T. pelusia (Audouin, 1826) = Tetragnatha nitens (Audouin, 1826)
- T. peninsulana Banks, 1898 = Tetragnatha bogotensis Keyserling, 1865
- T. peruviana Taczanowski, 1878 = Tetragnatha nitens (Audouin, 1826)
- T. petrunkevitchi Caporiacco, 1947 = Tetragnatha mandibulata Walckenaer, 1841
- T. pinea Seeley, 1928 = Tetragnatha viridis Walckenaer, 1841
- T. potanini Schenkel, 1963 = Tetragnatha extensa (Linnaeus, 1758)
- T. producta (Franganillo, 1930) = Tetragnatha nitens (Audouin, 1826)
- T. propioides Schenkel, 1936 = Tetragnatha keyserlingi Simon, 1890
- T. punctipes Westring, 1874 = Tetragnatha dearmata Thorell, 1873
- T. qiuae Zhu, Song & Zhang, 2003 = Tetragnatha shoshone Levi, 1981
- T. quadridens Dondale, 1966 = Tetragnatha demissa L. Koch, 1872
- T. ramboi Mello-Leitão, 1943 = Tetragnatha bogotensis Keyserling, 1865
- T. recurva Schenkel, 1936 = Tetragnatha squamata Karsch, 1879
- T. rusticana Chickering, 1959 = Tetragnatha extensa (Linnaeus, 1758)
- T. sanctitata Walckenaer, 1841 = Tetragnatha elongata Walckenaer, 1841
- T. seminola Gertsch, 1936 = Tetragnatha nitens (Audouin, 1826)
- T. seneca Seeley, 1928 = Tetragnatha guatemalensis O. Pickard-Cambridge, 1889
- T. shikokiana Yaginuma, 1960 = Tetragnatha vermiformis Emerton, 1884
- T. siduo Chamberlin & Ivie, 1936 = Tetragnatha elongata Walckenaer, 1841
- T. soaresi Camargo, 1950 = Tetragnatha longidens Mello-Leitão, 1945
- T. steckleri Gertsch & Ivie, 1936 = Tetragnatha nitens (Audouin, 1826)
- T. trapezoides Walckenaer, 1841 = Tetragnatha versicolor Walckenaer, 1841
- T. tropica O. Pickard-Cambridge, 1889 = Tetragnatha elongata Walckenaer, 1841
- T. valoka Chrysanthus, 1975 = Tetragnatha biseriata Thorell, 1881
- T. vermiventris Schenkel, 1963 = Tetragnatha javana (Thorell, 1890)
- T. vicina Simon, 1897 = Tetragnatha nitens (Audouin, 1826)
