= Tetragnatha nigricans =

Conservation status
- Data Deficient (NZ TCS)

Scientific classification
- Domain: Eukaryota
- Kingdom: Animalia
- Phylum: Arthropoda
- Subphylum: Chelicerata
- Class: Arachnida
- Order: Araneae
- Infraorder: Araneomorphae
- Family: Tetragnathidae
- Genus: Tetragnatha
- Species: T. nigricans

Binomial name
- Tetragnatha nigricans Dalmas, 1917

Species of Arachnida

Tetragnatha nigricans is a species of Tetragnathidae spider that is endemic to New Zealand.

== Taxonomy ==
This species was described in 1917 by Raymond Comte de Dalmas from a female specimen collected in Whanganui.

== Description ==
The female is recorded at 5mm in length.

== Distribution ==
This species is only known from Whanganui, New Zealand.

== Conservation status ==
Under the New Zealand Threat Classification System, this species is listed as "Data Deficient" with the qualifiers of "Data Poor: Size" and "Data Poor: Trend".
