= Tetragnatha multipunctata =

Conservation status
- Data Deficient (NZ TCS)

Scientific classification
- Domain: Eukaryota
- Kingdom: Animalia
- Phylum: Arthropoda
- Subphylum: Chelicerata
- Class: Arachnida
- Order: Araneae
- Infraorder: Araneomorphae
- Family: Tetragnathidae
- Genus: Tetragnatha
- Species: T. multipunctata

Binomial name
- Tetragnatha multipunctata Urquhart, 1891

Species of Arachnida

Tetragnatha multipunctata is a species of Tetragnathidae spider that is endemic to New Zealand.

== Taxonomy ==
This species was described in 1891 by Arthur Urquhart from a female specimen collected in Taranaki.

== Description ==
The female is recorded at 9.1mm in length. This species has a brownish yellow cephalothorax, deep straw coloured legs and a deep violet abdomen with silvery flecks.

== Distribution ==
This species is only known from Taranaki, New Zealand.

== Conservation status ==
Under the New Zealand Threat Classification System, this species is listed as "Data Deficient" with the qualifiers of "Data Poor: Size" and "Data Poor: Trend".
