= Tetragnatha taylori =

Taylor's Long-jawed Spider

Scientific classification
- Kingdom: Animalia
- Phylum: Arthropoda
- Subphylum: Chelicerata
- Class: Arachnida
- Order: Araneae
- Infraorder: Araneomorphae
- Family: Tetragnathidae
- Genus: Tetragnatha
- Species: T. taylori

Binomial name
- Tetragnatha taylori O. Pickard-Cambridge, 1891

Species of spider

Tetragnatha taylori is a species of spider in the family Tetragnathidae. It is endemic to South Africa and is commonly known as Taylor's long-jawed spider.

== Distribution ==
Tetragnatha taylori is known only from South Africa, with the type locality given only as South Africa without an exact location specified.

== Habitat and ecology ==
The lifestyle of this species is unknown.

== Conservation ==
Tetragnatha taylori is listed as Data Deficient for unknown provenance and taxonomic reasons. The species is known only from a single unspecified site in South Africa. Additional sampling is needed to collect adult specimens and to determine the species' range. Threats to this species are unknown.

== Taxonomy ==
The species has not been revised since its original description in 1891. It is known only from the female holotype specimen.
