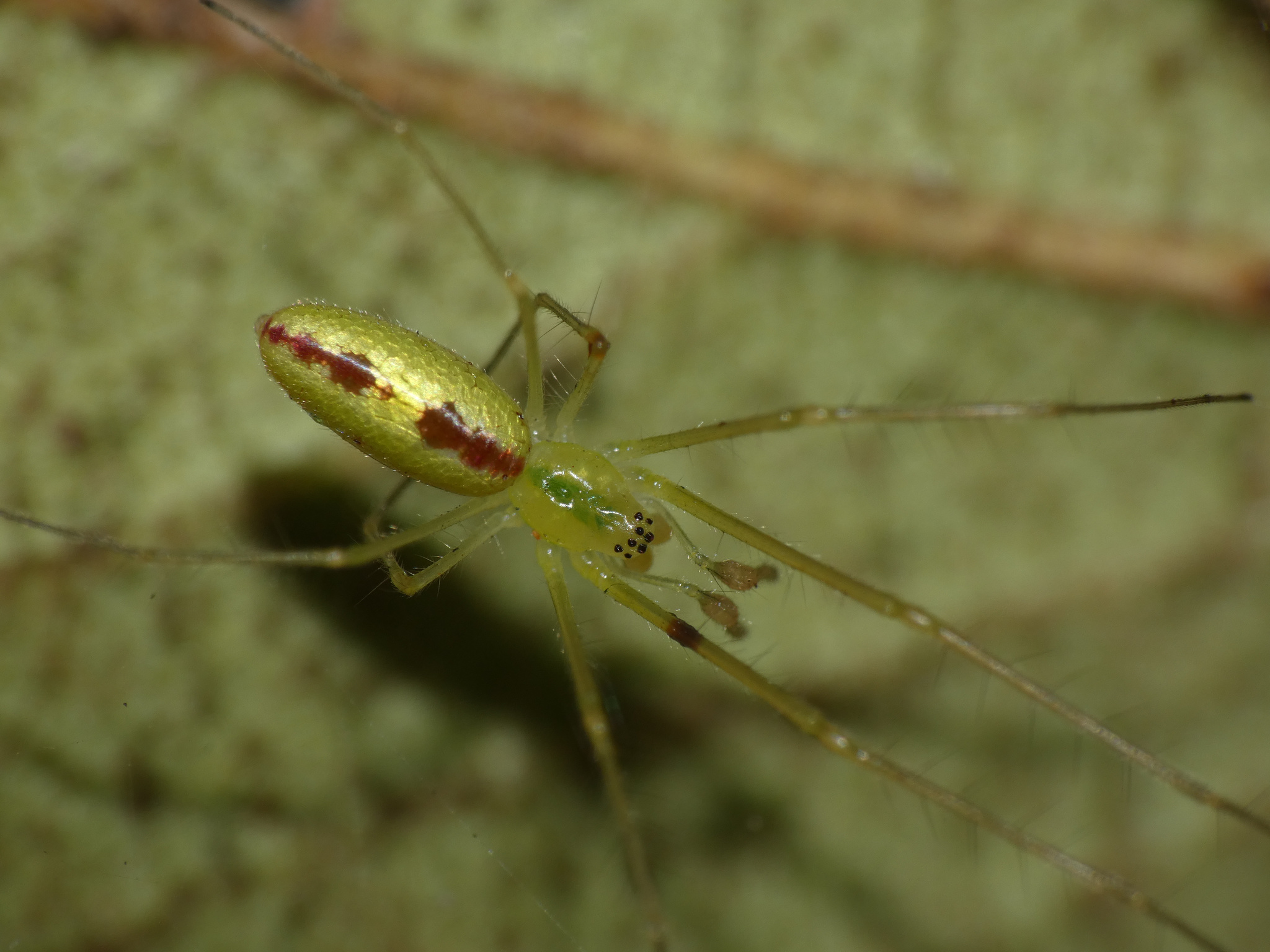

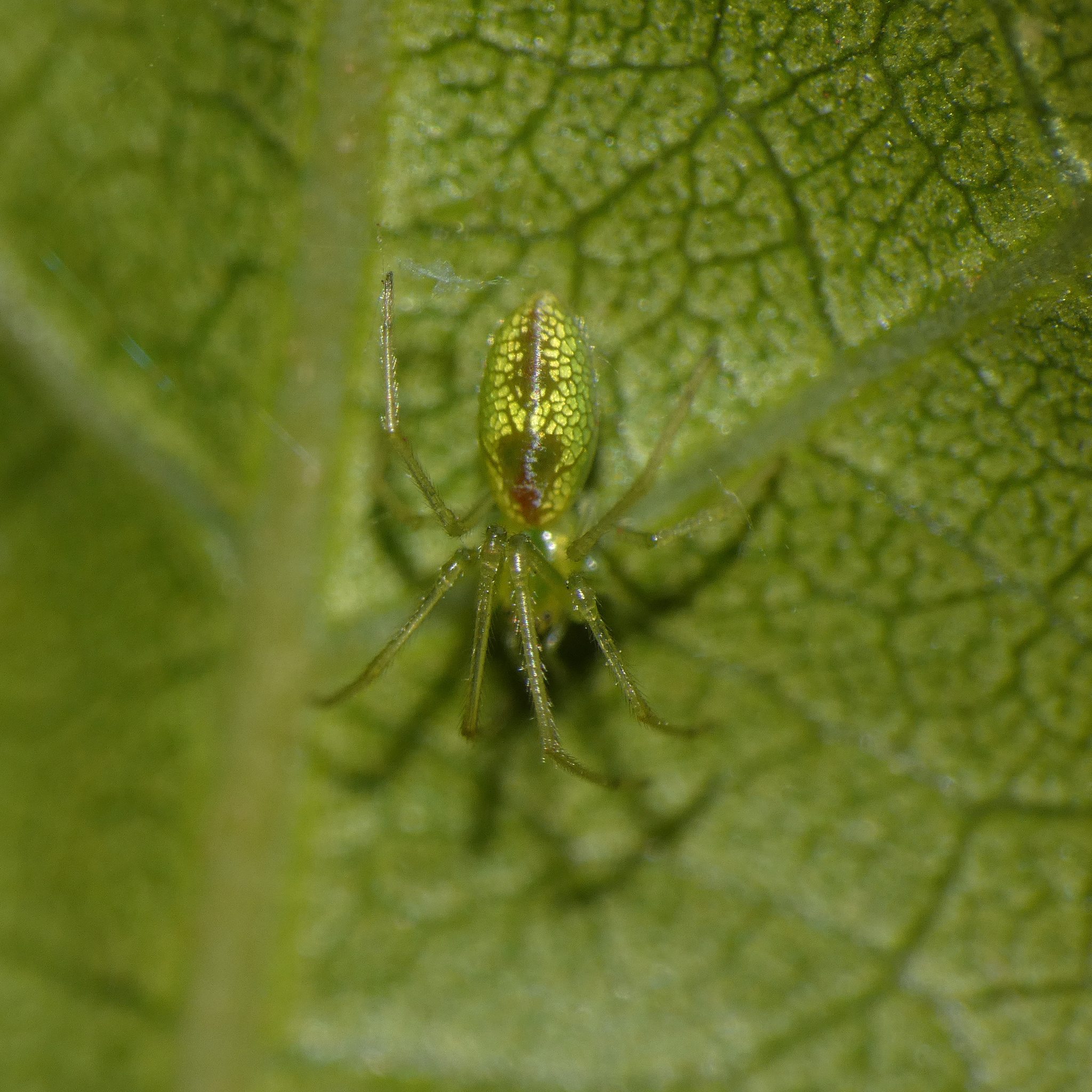

Scientific classification
- Kingdom: Animalia
- Phylum: Arthropoda
- Subphylum: Chelicerata
- Class: Arachnida
- Order: Araneae
- Infraorder: Araneomorphae
- Family: Tetragnathidae
- Genus: Tetragnatha
- Species: T. subsquamata

Binomial name
- Tetragnatha subsquamata Okuma, 1985

= Tetragnatha subsquamata =

Tanzania Long-jawed Spider

Species of spider

Tetragnatha subsquamata is a species of spider in the family Tetragnathidae. It is endemic to Africa and is commonly known as Tanzania long-jawed spider.

== Distribution ==
Tetragnatha subsquamata is known from Tanzania and South Africa. In South Africa, the species has been recorded from seven provinces at altitudes ranging from 7 to 1829 m.

== Habitat and ecology ==
These spiders construct orb webs in grass. In KwaZulu-Natal, the species is frequently sampled from coastal bush. It occurs in the Forest, Grassland, Indian Ocean Coastal Belt, and Savanna biomes. The species has also been sampled from avocado orchards, macadamia orchards, and maize fields.

== Description ==
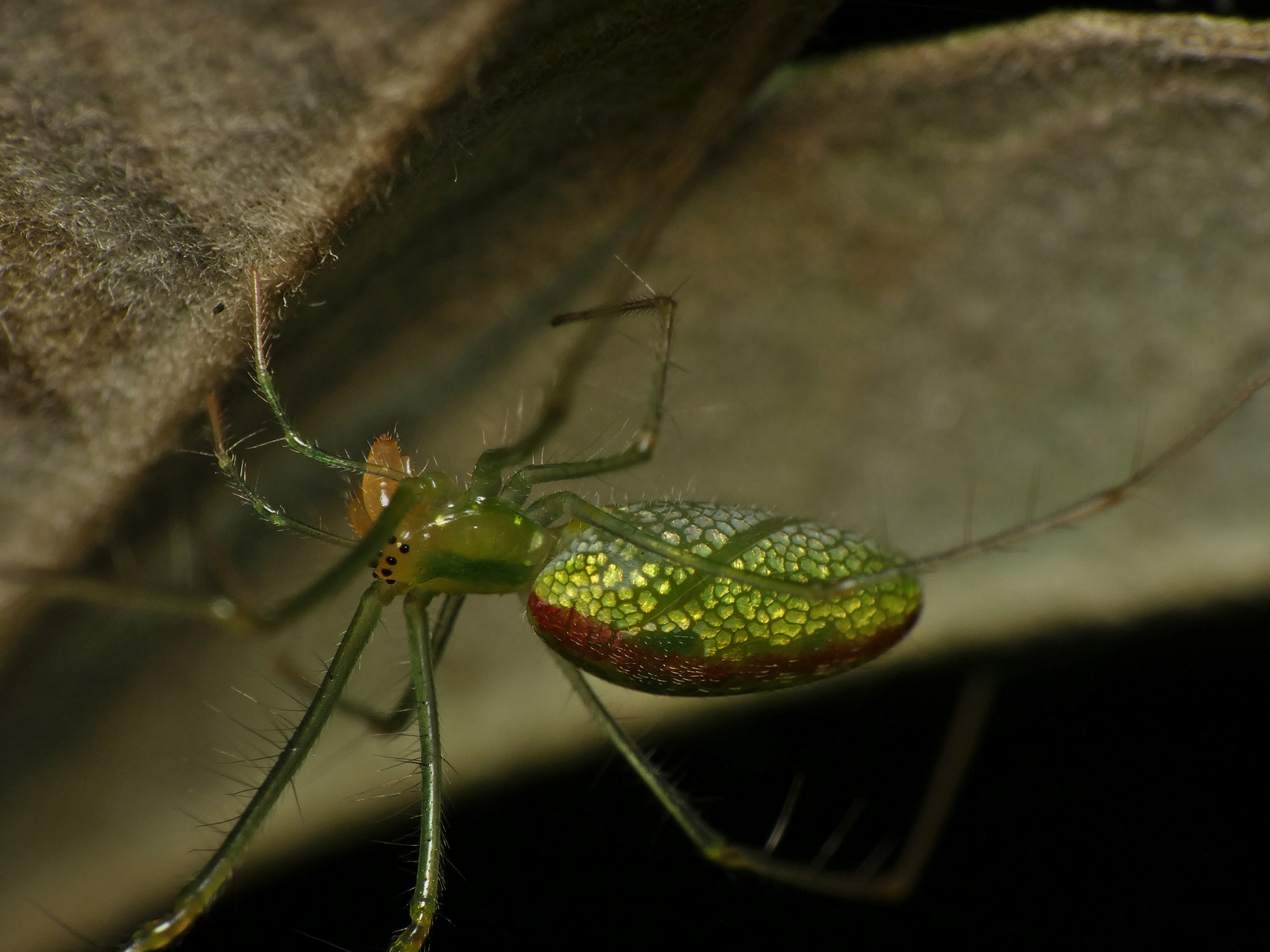

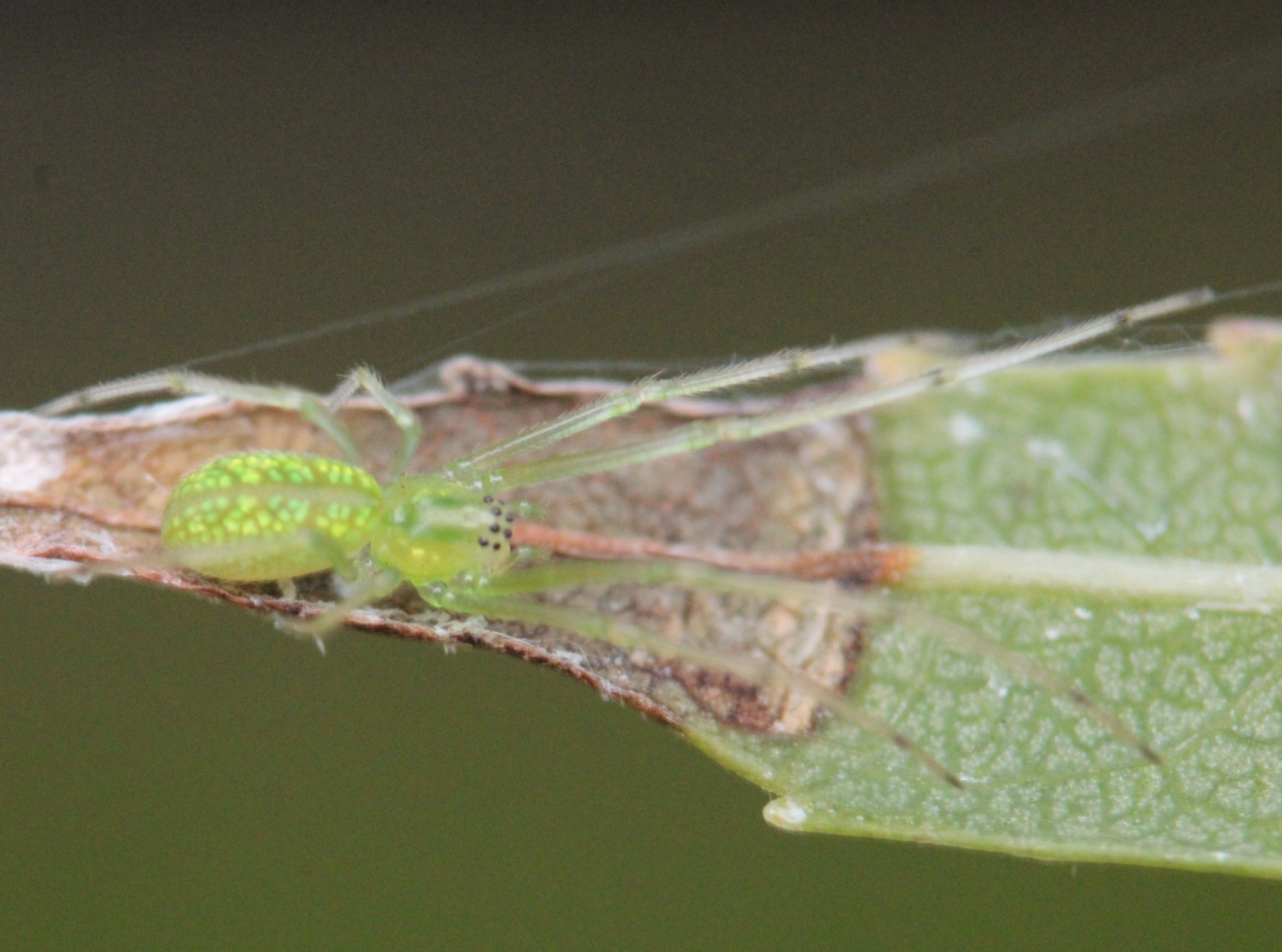

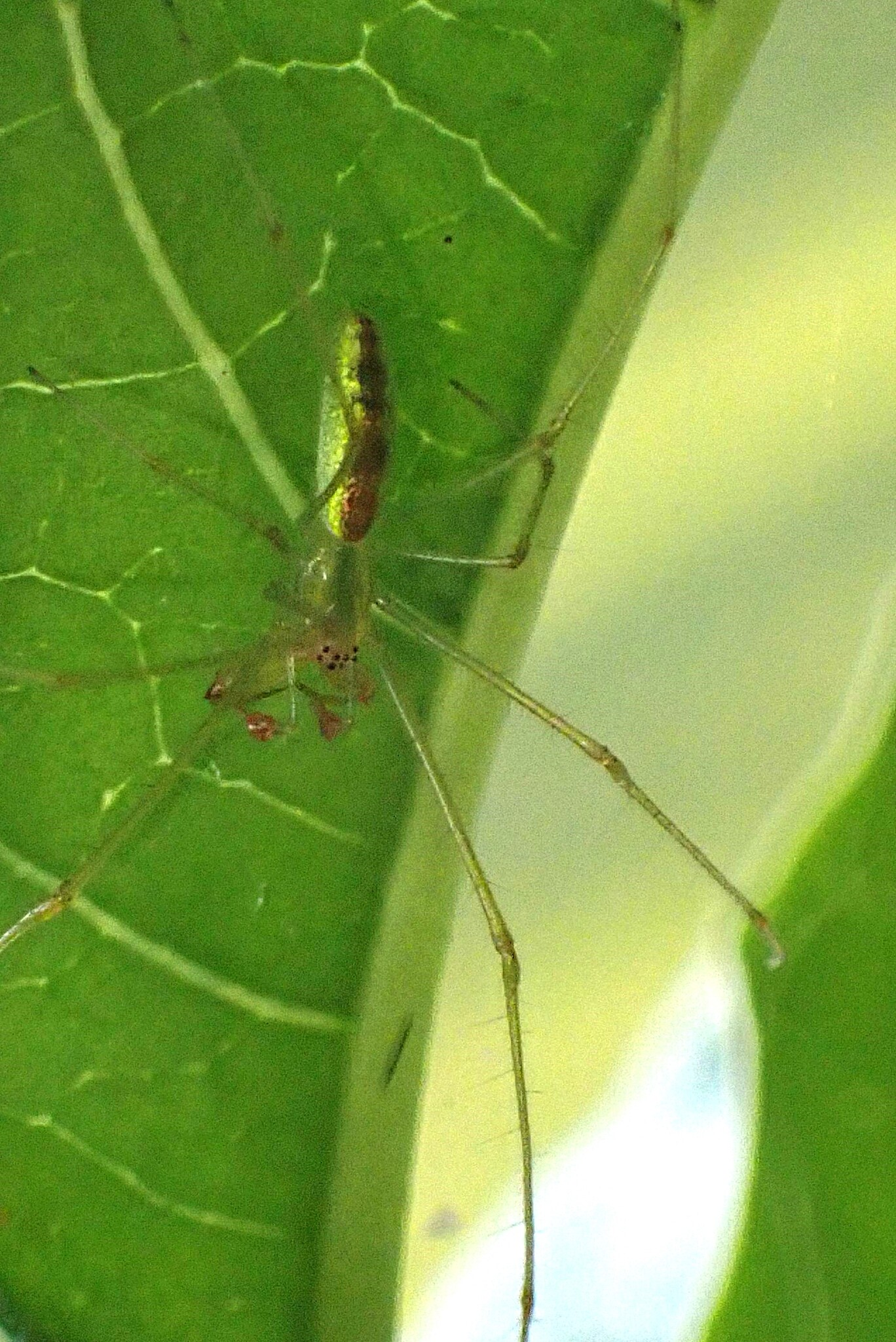

== Conservation ==
Tetragnatha subsquamata is listed as Least Concern due to its wide geographical range. The species has been sampled from several protected areas in South Africa. There are no significant threats to the species.

== Taxonomy ==
The species was originally described from Tanzania by Okuma in 1985. It was reviewed by Okuma and Dippenaar-Schoeman in 1988. Both sexes are known.
