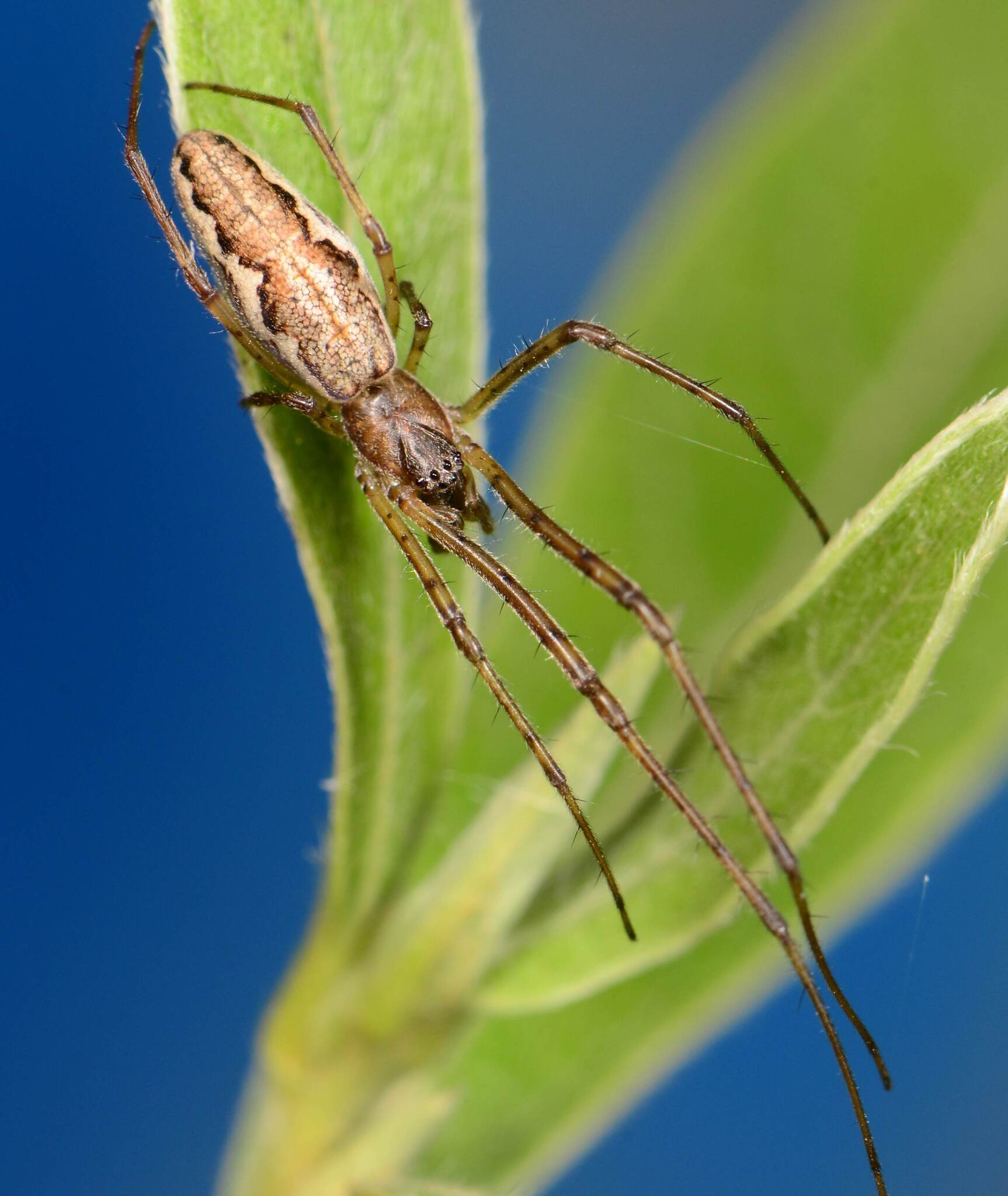
- female
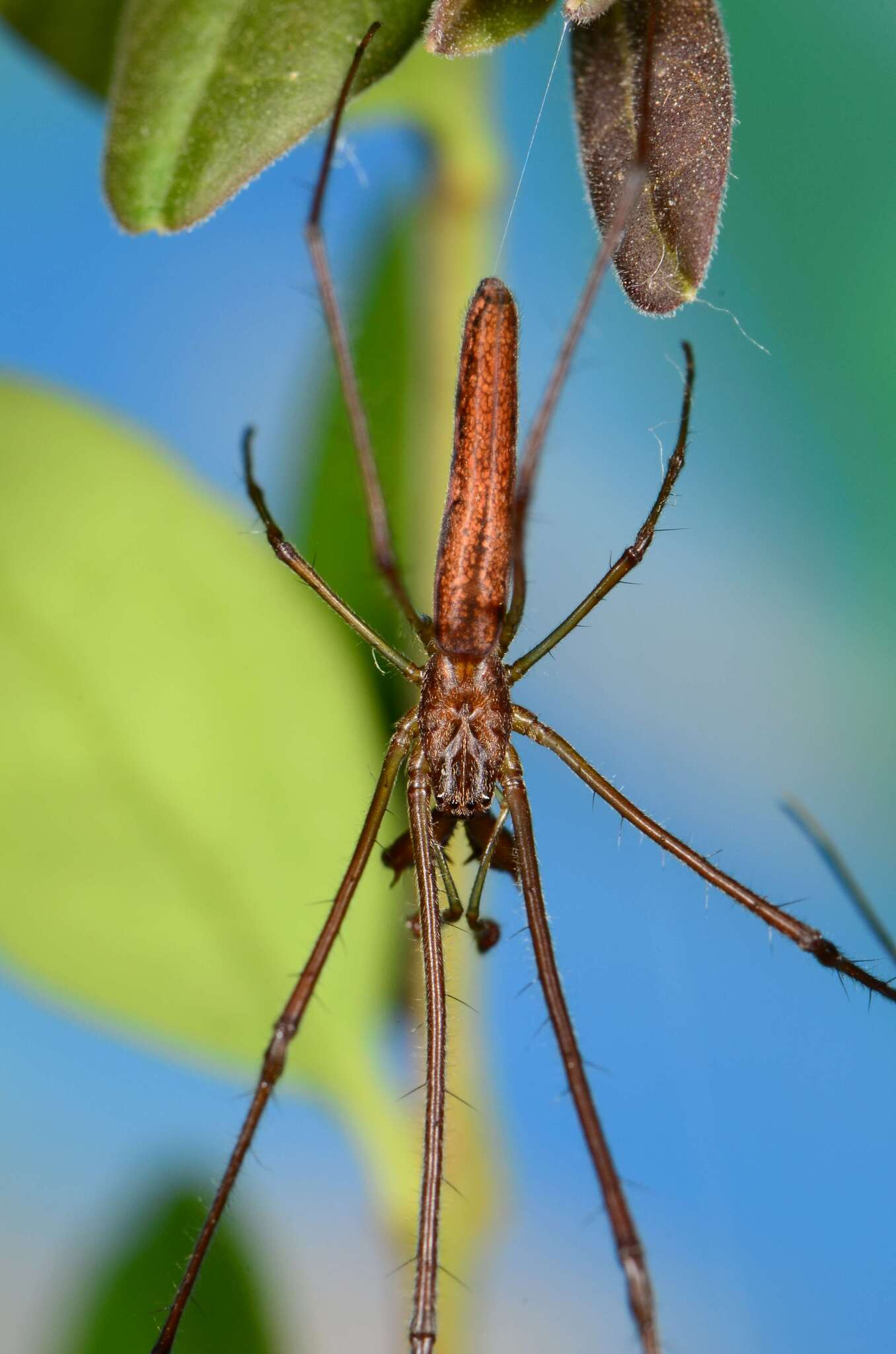
- male

Scientific classification
- Kingdom: Animalia
- Phylum: Arthropoda
- Subphylum: Chelicerata
- Class: Arachnida
- Order: Araneae
- Infraorder: Araneomorphae
- Family: Tetragnathidae
- Genus: Tetragnatha
- Species: T. keyserlingi

Binomial name
- Tetragnatha keyserlingi Simon, 1890
- blue: reported locations (WSC)

Synonyms
- T. mandibulata Keyserling, 1865; T. kochi Thorell, 1895; T. maxillosa Thorell, 1895; T. japonica Bösenberg & Strand, 1906; T. listeri Gravely, 1921; T. conformans Chamberlin, 1924; T. cliens Chamberlin, 1924; T. ethodon Chamberlin & Ivie, 1936; T. propioides Schenkel, 1936; T. diensens Zhao, 1993

= Tetragnatha keyserlingi =

Keyserling's Long-jawed Spider

Species of spider

Tetragnatha keyserlingi is a species of spider in the family Tetragnathidae. It has a broad distribution across Asia, Africa, and the Americas, and is commonly known as Keyserling's long-jawed spider.

== Distribution ==
Tetragnatha keyserlingi is widely distributed from Central America, the Caribbean, and Brazil, Africa, Korea, China, India to the Philippines, New Hebrides, and Polynesia.

In Africa, it is known from Botswana, Zambia, and South Africa.

== Habitat and ecology ==
These spiders construct orb webs in grass. The species has been sampled from the Forest, Nama Karoo, Grassland, Savanna, and Thicket biomes, at altitudes ranging from 47 to 1673 m.

== Description ==
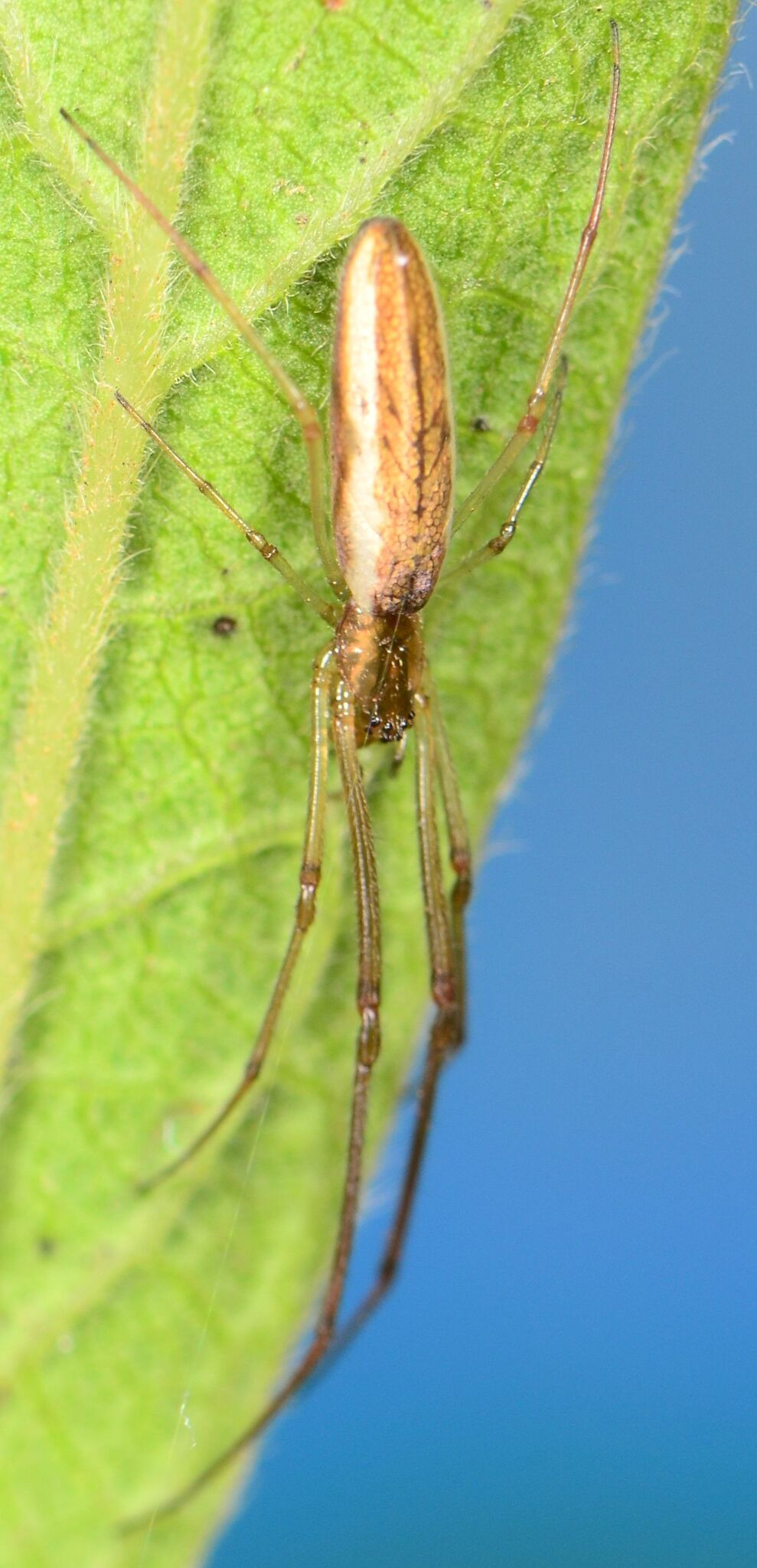
female

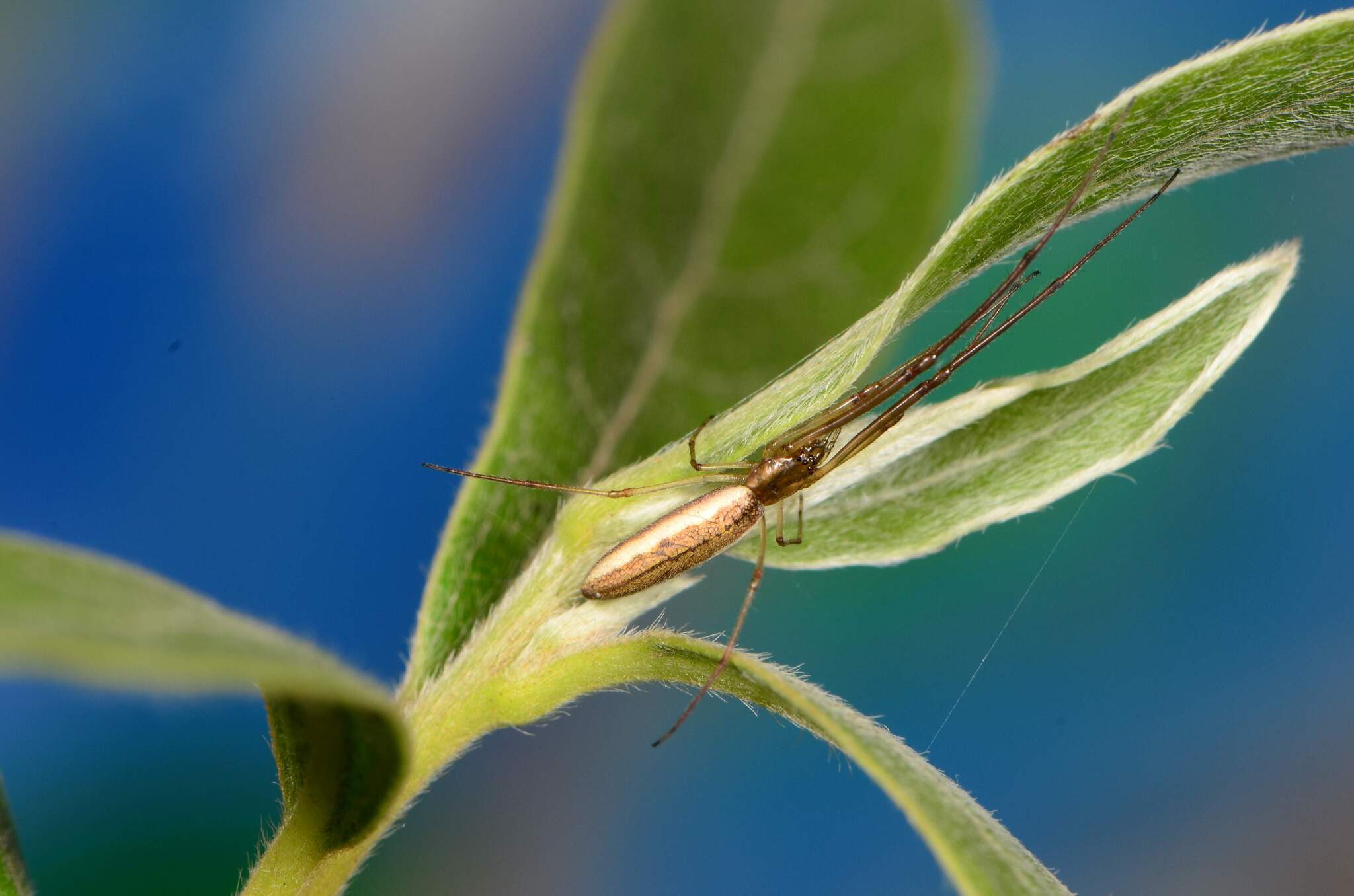
female

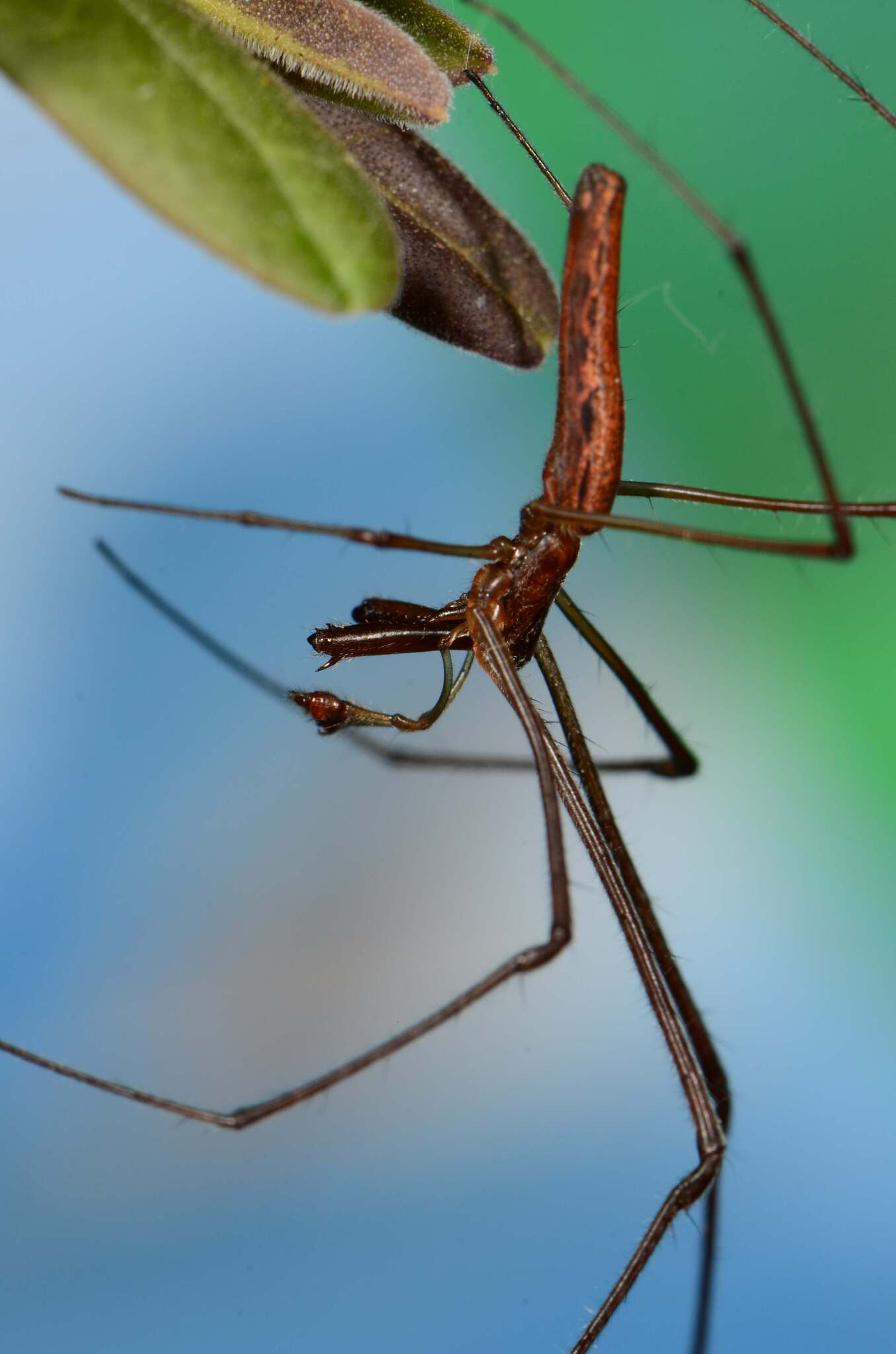
male

== Conservation ==
Tetragnatha keyserlingi is listed as Least Concern due to its wide geographical range. The species is protected in reserves such as Ndumo Game Reserve in South Africa. There are no significant threats to the species.

== Name ==
T. keyserlingi is named after Baltic-German arachnologist Eugen von Keyserling (1833-1889).

== Taxonomy ==
The species was reviewed by Okuma and Dippenaar-Schoeman in 1988 as T. maxillosa, but in 2019 Castanheira and colleagues synonymized T. maxillosa with T. keyserlingi. It was originally described from Java by Simon in 1890. Both sexes are known.
