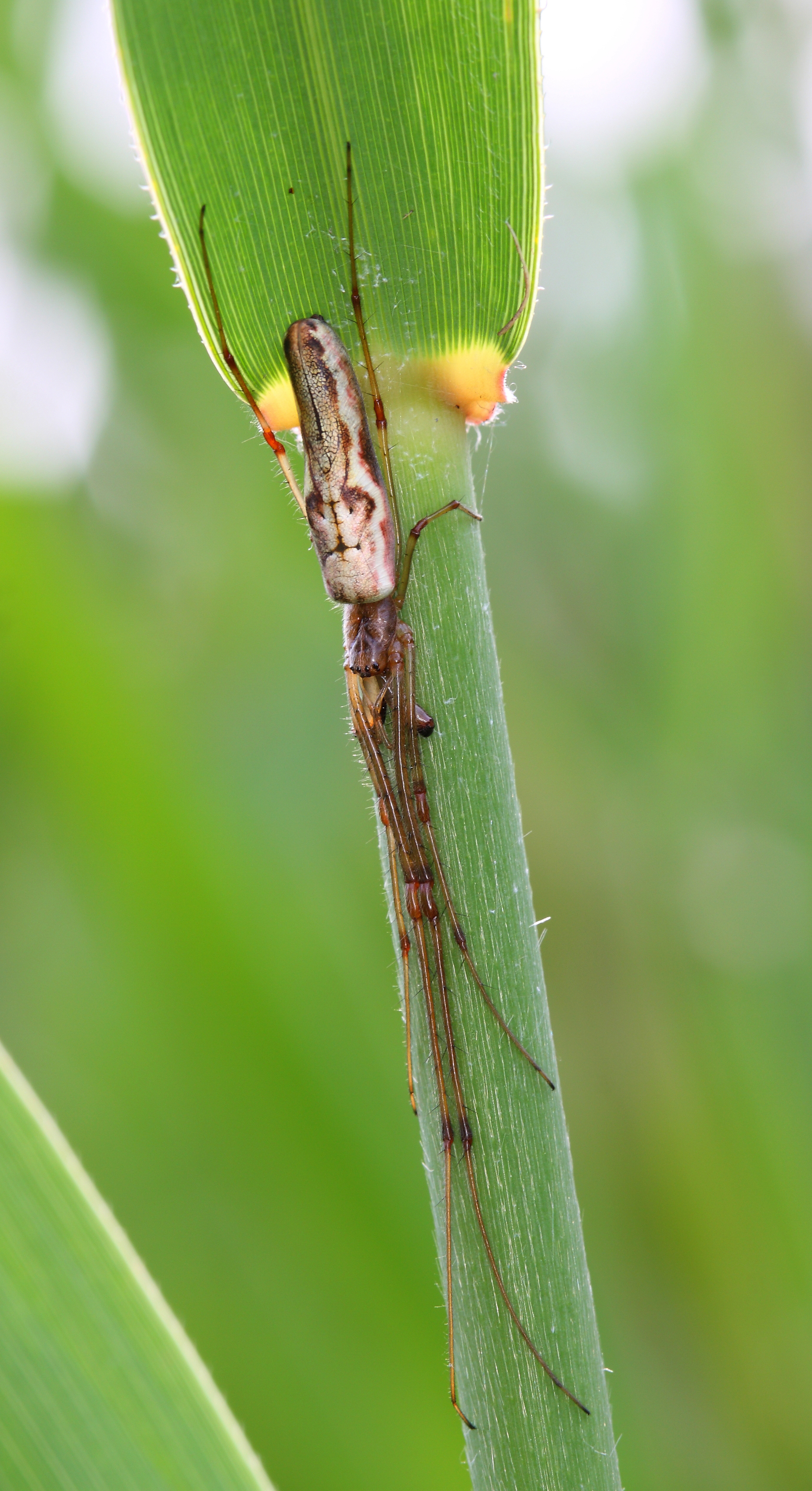
- from Japan

Scientific classification
- Kingdom: Animalia
- Phylum: Arthropoda
- Subphylum: Chelicerata
- Class: Arachnida
- Order: Araneae
- Infraorder: Araneomorphae
- Family: Tetragnathidae
- Genus: Tetragnatha
- Species: T. praedonia

Binomial name
- Tetragnatha praedonia L. Koch, 1878

Synonyms
- Tetragnatha nigrita niccensis Strand, 1906

= Tetragnatha praedonia =

Species of spider

Tetragnatha praedonia is a species of spider in the long-jawed orb weaver family Tetragnathidae. It is widely distributed across East Asia, including Russia (Far East), China, Korea, Japan, Taiwan, and Laos.

== Etymology ==
The specific epithet praedonia is Latin, likely derived from praedo meaning "robber" or "thief", referring to the spider's predatory nature.

== Distribution ==
T. praedonia has been recorded from Russia (Far East), Korea, Japan, China, Taiwan, and Laos.

== Description ==
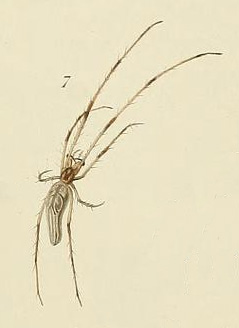
female from 1906 paper by Bösenberg & Strand

Tetragnatha praedonia exhibits the characteristic elongated body form typical of the genus. Based on the original description by Koch (1878), the species shows sexual dimorphism with distinct differences between males and females.

The male has a brownish-yellow cephalothorax with darker coloration on the lateral margins and furrows separating the head and thoracic regions. The chelicerae are brownish-yellow with a reddish-brown fang groove. The maxillae are brownish-yellow, the labium is dark yellowish-brown, and the sternum is brownish-yellow. The opisthosoma is yellowish-white above with a fine darker pattern and a brown longitudinal stripe running from the base to the posterior end. A continuous blackish longitudinal band extends along both sides and underneath. The spinnerets are yellowish-brown with two white spots on each side.

The female is generally larger than the male, with the cephalothorax being slightly longer than wide. The species displays the typical tetragnatid characteristic of extremely long chelicerae, particularly pronounced in males, which are used during mating when males lock jaws with females.
