= Tetragnatha caudata =

Scientific classification
- Domain: Eukaryota
- Kingdom: Animalia
- Phylum: Arthropoda
- Subphylum: Chelicerata
- Class: Arachnida
- Order: Araneae
- Infraorder: Araneomorphae
- Family: Tetragnathidae
- Genus: Tetragnatha
- Species: T. caudata

Binomial name
- Tetragnatha caudata Emerton, 1884

Species of spider

Tetragnatha caudata is a species of long-jawed orb weaver in the family of spiders known as Tetragnathidae. It is found in North, Central America, Cuba, and Jamaica.
