= List of Tetragnathidae species =

This page lists all described genera and species of the spider family Tetragnathidae. As of March 2021, the World Spider Catalog accepts 989 species in 50 genera:

== A ==
=== Alcimosphenus ===
Alcimosphenus

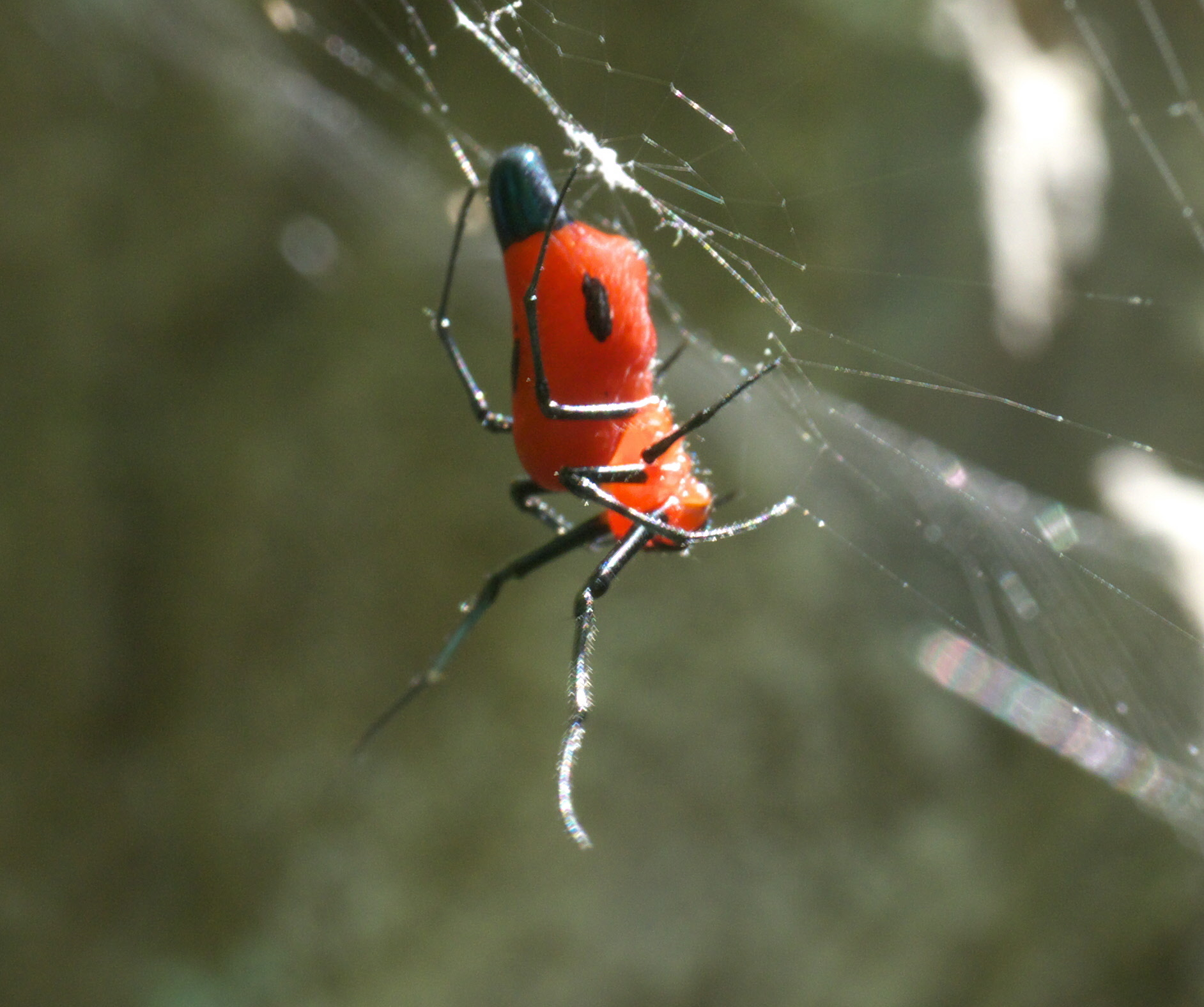
Alcimosphenus licinus

Alcimosphenus Simon, 1895

- Alcimosphenus licinus Simon, 1895 (type) — Caribbean; apparently introduced in Florida.

=== Allende ===
Allende Álvarez-Padilla, 2007

- Allende longipes (Nicolet, 1849) — Chile, Argentina
- Allende nigrohumeralis (F. O. Pickard-Cambridge, 1899) — Chile (Juan Fernandez Is., mainland), Chile, Argentina
- Allende patagiatus (Simon, 1901) — Chile, Argentina
- Allende puyehuensis Álvarez-Padilla, 2007 (type) — Chile

=== Antillognatha ===
Antillognatha Bryant, 1945

- Antillognatha lucida Bryant, 1945 (type) — Hispaniola

=== Atelidea ===
Atelidea Simon, 1895

- Atelidea nona Sankaran, Malamel, Joseph & Sebastian, 2017 — India
- Atelidea spinosa Simon, 1895 (type) — Sri Lanka

=== Azilia ===
Azilia Keyserling, 1881

- Azilia affinis O. Pickard-Cambridge, 1893 — USA to Panama
- Azilia boudeti Simon, 1895 — Brazil
- Azilia eximia (Mello-Leitão, 1940) — Brazil
- Azilia formosa Keyserling, 1881 (type) — Peru
- Azilia guatemalensis O. Pickard-Cambridge, 1889 — Central America to Peru, St. Vincent
- Azilia histrio Simon, 1895 — Brazil
- Azilia integrans (Mello-Leitão, 1935) — Brazil
- Azilia marmorata Mello-Leitão, 1948 — Guyana
- Azilia montana Bryant, 1940 — Cuba
- Azilia rojasi Simon, 1895 — Venezuela
- Azilia vachoni (Caporiacco, 1954) — French Guiana

== C ==
=== Chrysometa ===
Chrysometa Simon, 1894

- Chrysometa acinosa Álvarez-Padilla, 2007 — Chile
- Chrysometa adelis Levi, 1986 — Colombia
- Chrysometa alajuela Levi, 1986 — Costa Rica to Colombia
- Chrysometa alboguttata (O. Pickard-Cambridge, 1889) — Mexico to Colombia
- Chrysometa allija Levi, 1986 — Ecuador
- Chrysometa antonio Levi, 1986 — Colombia
- Chrysometa aramba Levi, 1986 — Brazil
- Chrysometa atotonilco Salgueiro-Sepúlveda & Álvarez-Padilla, 2018 — Mexico
- Chrysometa aureola (Keyserling, 1884) — Brazil, Trinidad
- Chrysometa banos Levi, 1986 — Ecuador
- Chrysometa bella (Banks, 1909) — Costa Rica
- Chrysometa bigibbosa (Keyserling, 1864) — Colombia
- Chrysometa bolivari Levi, 1986 — Ecuador
- Chrysometa bolivia Levi, 1986 — Bolivia, Colombia
- Chrysometa boquete Levi, 1986 — Panama, Colombia
- Chrysometa boraceia Levi, 1986 — Brazil, Paraguay, Uruguay
- Chrysometa brevipes (O. Pickard-Cambridge, 1889) — Mexico, Guatemala
- Chrysometa browni Levi, 1986 — Ecuador
- Chrysometa buenaventura Levi, 1986 — Colombia
- Chrysometa buga Levi, 1986 — Colombia
- Chrysometa butamalal Levi, 1986 — Chile
- Chrysometa cali Levi, 1986 — Colombia
- Chrysometa calima Levi, 1986 — Colombia
- Chrysometa cambara Levi, 1986 — Brazil
- Chrysometa candianii Nogueira, Pena-Barbosa, Venticinque & Brescovit, 2011 — Brazil
- Chrysometa carmelo Levi, 1986 — Colombia
- Chrysometa cebolleta Levi, 1986 — Colombia
- Chrysometa chica Levi, 1986 — Ecuador
- Chrysometa chipinque Levi, 1986 — Mexico, Guatemala
- Chrysometa choroni Levi, 1986 — Venezuela
- Chrysometa chulumani Levi, 1986 — Bolivia
- Chrysometa churitepui Levi, 1986 — Venezuela
- Chrysometa citlaltepetl Salgueiro-Sepúlveda & Álvarez-Padilla, 2018 — Mexico
- Chrysometa claudia Levi, 1986 — Venezuela
- Chrysometa columbicola Strand, 1916 — Colombia
- Chrysometa conspersa (Bryant, 1945) — Hispaniola
- Chrysometa cornuta (Bryant, 1945) — Hispaniola
- Chrysometa craigae Levi, 1986 — Costa Rica
- Chrysometa cuenca Levi, 1986 — Ecuador
- Chrysometa decolorata (O. Pickard-Cambridge, 1889) — Guatemala
- Chrysometa digua Levi, 1986 — Colombia
- Chrysometa distincta (Bryant, 1940) — Cuba
- Chrysometa donachui Levi, 1986 — Colombia
- Chrysometa duida Levi, 1986 — Venezuela
- Chrysometa eberhardi Levi, 1986 — Colombia
- Chrysometa ecarup Levi, 1986 — Colombia
- Chrysometa eugeni Levi, 1986 — Martinique, St. Vincent
- Chrysometa explorans (Chamberlin, 1916) — Peru
- Chrysometa fidelia Levi, 1986 — Colombia
- Chrysometa flava (O. Pickard-Cambridge, 1894) — Mexico to Brazil
- Chrysometa flavicans (Caporiacco, 1947) — Brazil, Guyana, Suriname
- Chrysometa fuscolimbata (Archer, 1958) — Jamaica
- Chrysometa guadeloupensis Levi, 1986 — Guadeloupe
- Chrysometa guttata (Keyserling, 1881) — Colombia, Venezuela, Peru, Brazil
- Chrysometa hamata (Bryant, 1942) — Puerto Rico
- Chrysometa heredia Levi, 1986 — Costa Rica
- Chrysometa huanuco Levi, 1986 — Peru
- Chrysometa huila Levi, 1986 — Colombia, Ecuador
- Chrysometa incachaca Levi, 1986 — Colombia
- Chrysometa itaimba Levi, 1986 — Brazil
- Chrysometa jayuyensis (Petrunkevitch, 1930) — Puerto Rico
- Chrysometa jelskii Levi, 1986 — Peru
- Chrysometa jordao Levi, 1986 — Brazil
- Chrysometa keyserlingi Levi, 1986 — Colombia
- Chrysometa kochalkai Levi, 1986 — Colombia
- Chrysometa lancetilla Levi, 1986 — Honduras
- Chrysometa lapazensis Levi, 1986 — Bolivia
- Chrysometa lepida (Keyserling, 1881) — Peru
- Chrysometa levii Álvarez-Padilla, 2007 — Chile
- Chrysometa linguiformis (Franganillo, 1930) — Cuba, Jamaica
- Chrysometa lomanhungae Nogueira, Pena-Barbosa, Venticinque & Brescovit, 2011 — Brazil
- Chrysometa ludibunda (Keyserling, 1893) — Brazil, Paraguay
- Chrysometa luisi Levi, 1986 — Ecuador
- Chrysometa machala Levi, 1986 — Ecuador, Peru
- Chrysometa macintyrei Levi, 1986 — Ecuador
- Chrysometa macuchi Levi, 1986 — Ecuador, Peru
- Chrysometa maculata (Bryant, 1945) — Hispaniola
- Chrysometa magdalena Levi, 1986 — Colombia
- Chrysometa maitae Álvarez-Padilla, 2007 — Chile
- Chrysometa malkini Levi, 1986 — Colombia
- Chrysometa marta Levi, 1986 — Colombia
- Chrysometa merida Levi, 1986 — Venezuela
- Chrysometa minuta (Keyserling, 1883) — Brazil
- Chrysometa minza Levi, 1986 — Ecuador
- Chrysometa monticola (Keyserling, 1883) — Peru
- Chrysometa muerte Levi, 1986 — Costa Rica to Colombia
- Chrysometa niebla Levi, 1986 — Colombia
- Chrysometa nigroventris (Keyserling, 1879) — Colombia or Panama
- Chrysometa nigrovittata (Keyserling, 1865) — Colombia, Ecuador
- Chrysometa nubigena Nogueira, Pena-Barbosa, Venticinque & Brescovit, 2011 — Brazil
- Chrysometa nuboso Levi, 1986 — Costa Rica
- Chrysometa nuevagranada Levi, 1986 — Colombia
- Chrysometa obscura (Bryant, 1945) — Hispaniola
- Chrysometa opulenta (Keyserling, 1881) — Peru, Brazil
- Chrysometa otavalo Levi, 1986 — Ecuador
- Chrysometa palenque Levi, 1986 — Mexico to Honduras
- Chrysometa pecki Levi, 1986 — Jamaica
- Chrysometa pena Simó, Álvarez & Laborda, 2016 — Uruguay
- Chrysometa penai Levi, 1986 — Ecuador
- Chrysometa petrasierwaldae Nogueira, Pena-Barbosa, Venticinque & Brescovit, 2011 — Brazil
- Chrysometa pichincha Levi, 1986 — Ecuador
- Chrysometa pilimbala Levi, 1986 — Colombia
- Chrysometa plana Levi, 1986 — Ecuador
- Chrysometa poas Levi, 1986 — Mexico to Panama
- Chrysometa puebla Levi, 1986 — Mexico
- Chrysometa purace Levi, 1986 — Colombia
- Chrysometa puya Salgueiro-Sepúlveda & Álvarez-Padilla, 2018 — Mexico
- Chrysometa ramon Levi, 1986 — Peru
- Chrysometa raripila (Keyserling, 1893) — Brazil
- Chrysometa rincon Levi, 1986 — Mexico
- Chrysometa rosarium Salgueiro-Sepúlveda & Álvarez-Padilla, 2018 — Mexico
- Chrysometa rubromaculata (Keyserling, 1864) — Colombia or Panama
- Chrysometa sabana Levi, 1986 — Hispaniola
- Chrysometa saci Nogueira, Pena-Barbosa, Venticinque & Brescovit, 2011 — Brazil
- Chrysometa sagicuta Salgueiro-Sepúlveda & Álvarez-Padilla, 2018 — Mexico
- Chrysometa saladito Levi, 1986 — Colombia
- Chrysometa santosi Nogueira, Pena-Barbosa, Venticinque & Brescovit, 2011 — Brazil
- Chrysometa saramacca Levi, 1986 — Venezuela, Peru, Suriname
- Chrysometa satulla (Keyserling, 1881) — Peru
- Chrysometa satura Levi, 1986 — Costa Rica
- Chrysometa schneblei Levi, 1986 — Colombia, Ecuador
- Chrysometa serachui Levi, 1986 — Colombia
- Chrysometa sevillano Levi, 1986 — Colombia
- Chrysometa sicki Levi, 1986 — Brazil
- Chrysometa sondo Levi, 1986 — Colombia
- Chrysometa sumare Levi, 1986 — Brazil
- Chrysometa sztolcmani Levi, 1986 — Peru
- Chrysometa tenuipes (Keyserling, 1864) (type) — Colombia
- Chrysometa tinajillas Levi, 1986 — Ecuador
- Chrysometa triangulosa Salgueiro-Sepúlveda & Álvarez-Padilla, 2018 — Mexico
- Chrysometa troya Levi, 1986 — Ecuador
- Chrysometa tungurahua Levi, 1986 — Ecuador
- Chrysometa uaza Levi, 1986 — Ecuador, Colombia
- Chrysometa unicolor (Keyserling, 1881) — Colombia or Panama
- Chrysometa universitaria Levi, 1986 — Costa Rica, Panama
- Chrysometa ura Levi, 1986 — Ecuador
- Chrysometa utcuyacu Levi, 1986 — Peru
- Chrysometa valle Levi, 1986 — Colombia
- Chrysometa waikoxi Nogueira, Pena-Barbosa, Venticinque & Brescovit, 2011 — Brazil
- Chrysometa xamaticpac Salgueiro-Sepúlveda & Álvarez-Padilla, 2018 — Mexico
- Chrysometa xavantina Levi, 1986 — Brazil
- Chrysometa yanomami Nogueira, Pena-Barbosa, Venticinque & Brescovit, 2011 — Brazil
- Chrysometa yotoco Levi, 1986 — Colombia, Venezuela
- Chrysometa yungas Levi, 1986 — Bolivia
- Chrysometa yunque Levi, 1986 — Puerto Rico
- Chrysometa zelotypa (Keyserling, 1883) — Costa Rica to Peru

=== Cyrtognatha ===
Cyrtognatha Keyserling, 1881

- Cyrtognatha atopica Dimitrov & Hormiga, 2009 — Argentina
- Cyrtognatha bella (O. Pickard-Cambridge, 1896) — Costa Rica
- Cyrtognatha bryantae (Chickering, 1956) — Jamaica
- Cyrtognatha catia Dimitrov & Hormiga, 2009 — Colombia
- Cyrtognatha eberhardi Dimitrov & Hormiga, 2009 — Brazil
- Cyrtognatha espanola (Bryant, 1945) — Hispaniola
- Cyrtognatha insolita (Chickering, 1956) — Costa Rica, Panama
- Cyrtognatha lepida (O. Pickard-Cambridge, 1889) — Panama
- Cyrtognatha leviorum Dimitrov & Hormiga, 2009 — Panama
- Cyrtognatha morona Dimitrov & Hormiga, 2009 — Ecuador
- Cyrtognatha nigrovittata Keyserling, 1881 (type) — Peru
- Cyrtognatha orphana Dimitrov & Hormiga, 2009 — Brazil
- Cyrtognatha pachygnathoides (O. Pickard-Cambridge, 1894) — Costa Rica, Panama
- Cyrtognatha paradoxa Dimitrov & Hormiga, 2009 — Mexico
- Cyrtognatha pathetica Dimitrov & Hormiga, 2009 — Guatemala
- Cyrtognatha petila Dimitrov & Hormiga, 2009 — Mexico
- Cyrtognatha quichua Dimitrov & Hormiga, 2009 — Ecuador
- Cyrtognatha rucilla (Bryant, 1945) — Hispaniola
- Cyrtognatha serrata Simon, 1898 — Martinique, St. Vincent
- Cyrtognatha simoni (Bryant, 1940) — Cuba
- Cyrtognatha waorani Dimitrov & Hormiga, 2009 — Ecuador

== D ==
=== Dianleucauge ===
Dianleucauge Song & Zhu, 1994

- Dianleucauge deelemanae Song & Zhu, 1994 (type) — China

=== Diphya ===
Diphya Nicolet, 1849

- Diphya albula (Paik, 1983) — Korea
- Diphya bicolor Vellard, 1926 — Brazil
- Diphya foordi Omelko, Marusik & Lyle, 2020 — South Africa
- Diphya leroyorum Omelko, Marusik & Lyle, 2020 — South Africa
- Diphya limbata Simon, 1896 — Chile, Argentina
- Diphya macrophthalma Nicolet, 1849 (type) — Chile
- Diphya okumae Tanikawa, 1995 — China, Korea, Japan
- Diphya pumila Simon, 1889 — Madagascar
- Diphya qianica Zhu, Song & Zhang, 2003 — China
- Diphya rugosa Tullgren, 1902 — Chile
- Diphya simoni Kauri, 1950 — South Africa
- Diphya songi Wu & Yang, 2010 — China
- Diphya spinifera Tullgren, 1902 — Chile
- Diphya taiwanica Tanikawa, 1995 — Taiwan
- Diphya tanasevitchi (Zhang, Zhang & Yu, 2003) — China
- Diphya vanderwaltae Omelko, Marusik & Lyle, 2020 — South Africa
- Diphya wesolowskae Omelko, Marusik & Lyle, 2020 — South Africa
- Diphya wulingensis Yu, Zhang & Omelko, 2014 — China, Russia (Far East)

=== Dolichognatha ===
Dolichognatha

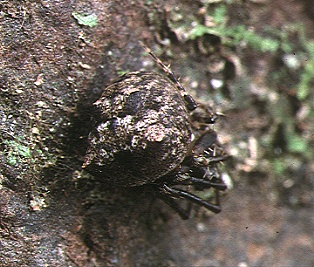
Dolichognatha umbrophila, female

Dolichognatha O. Pickard-Cambridge, 1869

- Dolichognatha aethiopica Tullgren, 1910 — East Africa
- Dolichognatha albida (Simon, 1895) — Sri Lanka, Thailand
- Dolichognatha baforti (Legendre, 1967) — Congo
- Dolichognatha bannaensis Wang, Zhang & Peng, 2020 — China
- Dolichognatha comorensis (Schmidt & Krause, 1993) — Comoros
- Dolichognatha cygnea (Simon, 1893) — Venezuela
- Dolichognatha deelemanae Smith, 2008 — Borneo
- Dolichognatha ducke Lise, 1993 — Brazil
- Dolichognatha erwini Brescovit & Cunha, 2001 — Brazil
- Dolichognatha incanescens (Simon, 1895) — Sri Lanka, Indonesia (Borneo), New Guinea, Australia (Queensland)
- Dolichognatha junlitjri (Barrion-Dupo & Barrion, 2014) — Philippines
- Dolichognatha kampa Brescovit & Cunha, 2001 — Brazil
- Dolichognatha kratochvili (Lessert, 1938) — Congo
- Dolichognatha lodiculafaciens (Hingston, 1932) — Guyana
- Dolichognatha lonarensis Bodkhe & Manthen, 2015 — India
- Dolichognatha longiceps (Thorell, 1895) — India, Myanmar, Thailand
- Dolichognatha mandibularis (Thorell, 1894) — Indonesia (Sumatra)
- Dolichognatha mapia Brescovit & Cunha, 2001 — Brazil
- Dolichognatha maturaca Lise, 1993 — Brazil
- Dolichognatha minuscula (Mello-Leitão, 1940) — Guyana
- Dolichognatha nietneri O. Pickard-Cambridge, 1869 (type) — Sri Lanka
- Dolichognatha pentagona (Hentz, 1850) — USA to Venezuela
- Dolichognatha petiti (Simon, 1884) — Congo, Equatorial Guinea (Bioko)
- Dolichognatha pinheiral Brescovit & Cunha, 2001 — Brazil
- Dolichognatha proserpina (Mello-Leitão, 1943) — Brazil
- Dolichognatha quadrituberculata (Keyserling, 1883) — Peru
- Dolichognatha quinquemucronata (Simon, 1895) — Sri Lanka
- Dolichognatha raveni Smith, 2008 — New Guinea, Australia (Queensland)
- Dolichognatha richardi (Marples, 1955) — Samoa
- Dolichognatha spinosa (Petrunkevitch, 1939) — Panama
- Dolichognatha tigrina Simon, 1893 — Caribbean, northern South America
- Dolichognatha umbrophila Tanikawa, 1991 — Taiwan, Japan (Okinawa Is.)

=== Doryonychus ===
Doryonychus Simon, 1900

- Doryonychus raptor Simon, 1900 (type) — Hawaii

=== Dyschiriognatha ===
Dyschiriognatha

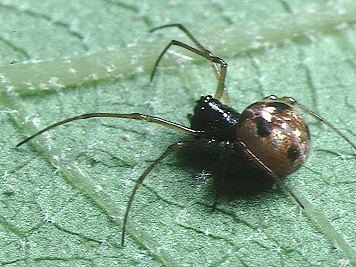
Dyschiriognatha dentata, female

Dyschiriognatha Simon, 1893

- Dyschiriognatha bedoti Simon, 1893 (type) — Borneo
- Dyschiriognatha lobata Vellard, 1926 — Brazil
- Dyschiriognatha oceanica Berland, 1929 — Samoa
- Dyschiriognatha upoluensis Marples, 1955 — Samoa, Niue, Cook Is. (Aitutaki), Society Is.

== G ==
=== Glenognatha ===
Glenognatha Simon, 1887

- Glenognatha argenteoguttata (Berland, 1935) — Marquesas Is.
- Glenognatha argyrostilba (O. Pickard-Cambridge, 1876) — Ivory Coast, Cameroon, Congo Egypt, Niger, Ethiopia. Introduced to Caribbean, Ecuador (mainland, Galapagos Is.), Brazil, St. Helena
- Glenognatha australis (Keyserling, 1883) — Ecuador to Argentina
- Glenognatha boraceia Cabra-García & Brescovit, 2016 — Brazil
- Glenognatha caaguara Cabra-García & Brescovit, 2016 — Brazil
- Glenognatha camisea Cabra-García & Brescovit, 2016 — Peru
- Glenognatha caparu Cabra-García & Brescovit, 2016 — Colombia, Venezuela, Suriname, Peru, Brazil, Bolivia
- Glenognatha caporiaccoi Platnick, 1993 — Guyana
- Glenognatha chamberlini (Berland, 1942) — French Polynesia (Austral Is.)
- Glenognatha dentata (Zhu & Wen, 1978) — China, India, Bangladesh, Myanmar, Vietnam, Philippines
- Glenognatha emertoni Simon, 1887 (type) — USA
- Glenognatha florezi Cabra-García & Brescovit, 2016 — Colombia
- Glenognatha foxi (McCook, 1894) — Canada to Panama
- Glenognatha ganeshi (Bodkhe, Manthen & Tanikawa, 2014) — India
- Glenognatha gaujoni Simon, 1895 — Ecuador, Colombia, Venezuela, Peru, Brazil
- Glenognatha globosa (Petrunkevitch, 1925) — Panama, Colombia, Venezuela
- Glenognatha gloriae (Petrunkevitch, 1930) — Puerto Rico
- Glenognatha gouldi Cabra-García & Brescovit, 2016 — USA, Mexico
- Glenognatha heleios Hormiga, 1990 — USA
- Glenognatha hirsutissima (Berland, 1935) — Marquesas Is.
- Glenognatha iviei Levi, 1980 — USA
- Glenognatha januari Cabra-García & Brescovit, 2016 — Brazil
- Glenognatha lacteovittata (Mello-Leitão, 1944) — Ecuador, Peru, Brazil, Argentina, Paraguay, Uruguay
- Glenognatha ledouxi Dierkens, 2016 — French Polynesia (Society Is.: Tahiti)
- Glenognatha mendezi Cabra-García & Brescovit, 2016 — Costa Rica, Colombia, Ecuador
- Glenognatha minuta Banks, 1898 — Mexico, Guatemala, Costa Rica, Panama, Cuba, Dominican Rep.
- Glenognatha nigromaculata (Berland, 1933) — Marquesas Is.
- Glenognatha osawai Baba & Tanikawa, 2018 — Japan
- Glenognatha patriceae Cabra-García & Brescovit, 2016 — Colombia
- Glenognatha paullula Sankaran, Caleb & Sebastian, 2020 — India
- Glenognatha phalangiops (Berland, 1942) — French Polynesia (Austral Is.)
- Glenognatha smilodon Bosmans & Bosselaers, 1994 — Cameroon
- Glenognatha spherella Chamberlin & Ivie, 1936 — Mexico to Peru
- Glenognatha tangi (Zhu, Song & Zhang, 2003) — China, Myanmar
- Glenognatha timbira Cabra-García & Brescovit, 2016 — Brazil
- Glenognatha vivianae Cabra-García & Brescovit, 2016 — Brazil

=== Guizygiella ===
Guizygiella Zhu, Kim & Song, 1997

- Guizygiella guangxiensis (Zhu & Zhang, 1993) — China, Laos
- Guizygiella indica (Tikader & Bal, 1980) — India
- Guizygiella melanocrania (Thorell, 1887) — India to China, Laos
- Guizygiella nadleri (Heimer, 1984) — China, Laos, Vietnam
- Guizygiella salta (Yin & Gong, 1996) (type) — China
- Guizygiella shivui (Patel & Reddy, 1990) — India

== H ==
=== Harlanethis ===
Harlanethis Álvarez-Padilla, Kallal & Hormiga, 2020

- Harlanethis lipscombae Álvarez-Padilla, Kallal & Hormiga, 2020 (type) — Australia (Queensland)
- Harlanethis weintrauborum Álvarez-Padilla, Kallal & Hormiga, 2020 — Australia (Queensland)

=== Hispanognatha ===
Hispanognatha Bryant, 1945

- Hispanognatha guttata Bryant, 1945 (type) — Hispaniola

=== Homalometa ===
Homalometa Simon, 1898

- Homalometa chiriqui Levi, 1986 — Costa Rica, Panama
- Homalometa nigritarsis Simon, 1898 (type) — Cuba, Lesser Antilles, Mexico, Panama
- Homalometa nossa Levi, 1986 — Brazil

== I ==
=== Iamarra ===
Iamarra Álvarez-Padilla, Kallal & Hormiga, 2020

- Iamarra multitheca Álvarez-Padilla, Kallal & Hormiga, 2020 (type) — Australia (Queensland)

== L ==
=== Leucauge ===
Leucauge

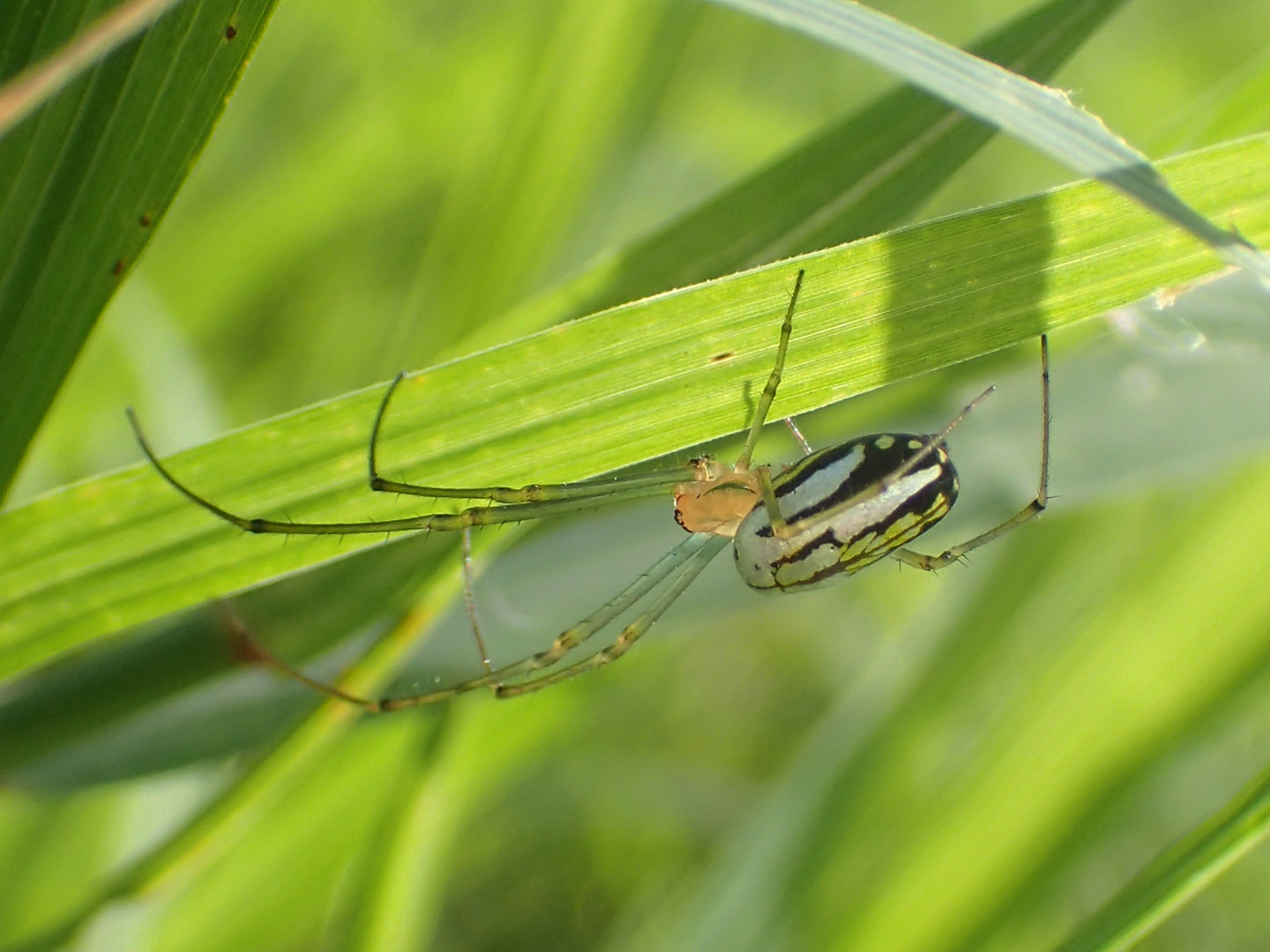
Leucauge argyra

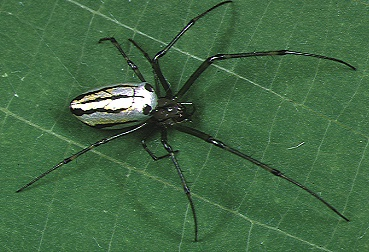
Leucauge blanda, female

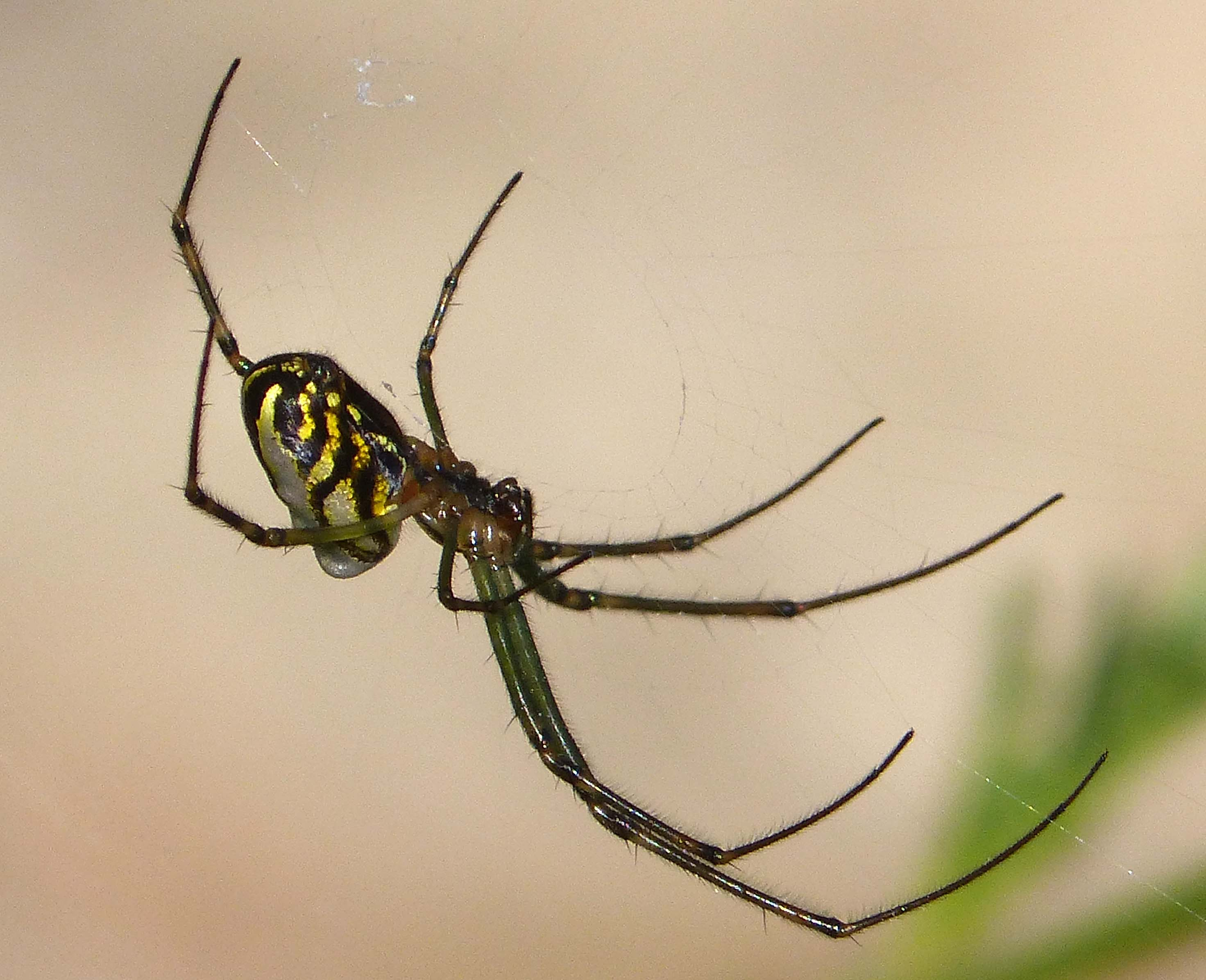
Leucauge granulata

Leucauge White, 1841

- Leucauge abyssinica Strand, 1907 — Ethiopia
- Leucauge acuminata (O. Pickard-Cambridge, 1889) — Mexico, Central America
- Leucauge albomaculata (Thorell, 1899) — Cameroon
- Leucauge amanica Strand, 1907 — East Africa
- Leucauge analis (Thorell, 1899) — Cameroon, Equatorial Guinea
- Leucauge annulipedella Strand, 1911 — Indonesia (Kei Is.)
- Leucauge apicata (Thorell, 1899) — Cameroon
- Leucauge arbitrariana Strand, 1913 — Papua New Guinea (Bismarck Arch.)
- Leucauge argentea (Keyserling, 1865) — Mexico, Colombia
- Leucauge argenteanigra (Karsch, 1884) — São Tomé and Príncipe
- Leucauge argentina (Hasselt, 1882) — Singapore, Indonesia (Sumatra), Philippines, Taiwan
  - Leucauge argentina nigriceps (Thorell, 1890) — Malaysia
- Leucauge argyra (Walckenaer, 1841) — USA to Brazil
- Leucauge argyrescens Benoit, 1978 — Comoros, Seychelles
- Leucauge argyroaffinis Soares & Camargo, 1948 — Brazil
- Leucauge argyrobapta (White, 1841) (type) — USA to Brazil
- Leucauge atrostricta Badcock, 1932 — Paraguay
- Leucauge aurocincta (Thorell, 1877) — Indonesia (Sulawesi, Ambon)
- Leucauge aurostriata (O. Pickard-Cambridge, 1897) — Mexico, Panama
- Leucauge badiensis Roewer, 1961 — Senegal
- Leucauge beata (Pocock, 1901) — India
- Leucauge bituberculata Baert, 1987 — Ecuador (Galapagos Is.)
- Leucauge blanda (L. Koch, 1878) — Russia (Far East), China, Korea, Taiwan, Japan
- Leucauge bontoc Barrion & Litsinger, 1995 — Philippines
- Leucauge branicki (Taczanowski, 1874) — Ecuador, Guyana, Brazil
- Leucauge brevitibialis Tullgren, 1910 — East Africa
- Leucauge cabindae (Brito Capello, 1866) — West Africa
- Leucauge camelina Caporiacco, 1940 — Ethiopia
- Leucauge camerunensis Strand, 1907 — Cameroon
- Leucauge capelloi Simon, 1903 — Equatorial Guinea
- Leucauge caucaensis Strand, 1908 — Colombia
- Leucauge caudata Hogg, 1914 — New Guinea
- Leucauge celebesiana (Walckenaer, 1841) — Russia (Far East), Korea, India to China, Vietnam, Laos, Japan, Indonesia (Sulawesi), New Guinea
- Leucauge clarki Locket, 1968 — Angola
- Leucauge comorensis Schmidt & Krause, 1993 — Comoros
- Leucauge conifera Hogg, 1919 — Indonesia (Sumatra)
- Leucauge cordivittata Strand, 1911 — Indonesia (Kei Is.)
- Leucauge crucinota (Bösenberg & Strand, 1906) — China, Japan
- Leucauge curta (O. Pickard-Cambridge, 1889) — Panama
- Leucauge decorata (Blackwall, 1864) — Pakistan, India, Bangladesh to Thailand, Philippines, China, Japan, Indonesia, Papua New Guinea, Australia
  - Leucauge decorata nigricauda Schenkel, 1944 — Timor
- Leucauge digna (O. Pickard-Cambridge, 1870) — St. Helena
- Leucauge ditissima (Thorell, 1887) — Sri Lanka, Myanmar
- Leucauge dorsotuberculata Tikader, 1982 — India
- Leucauge dromedaria (Thorell, 1881) — Australia, New Zealand
- Leucauge emertoni (Thorell, 1890) — Indonesia (Nias Is.)
- Leucauge eua Strand, 1911 — Tonga
- Leucauge fasciiventris Kulczyński, 1911 — New Guinea
- Leucauge festiva (Blackwall, 1866) — Africa
- Leucauge fibulata (Thorell, 1892) — Singapore, Indonesia (Sumatra)
- Leucauge fishoekensis Strand, 1909 — South Africa
- Leucauge formosa (Blackwall, 1863) — Brazil
  - Leucauge formosa pozonae Schenkel, 1953 — Venezuela
- Leucauge fragilis (O. Pickard-Cambridge, 1889) — Guatemala, Costa Rica
- Leucauge frequens Tullgren, 1910 — East Africa
- Leucauge funebris Mello-Leitão, 1930 — Brazil, French Guiana
- Leucauge gemminipunctata Chamberlin & Ivie, 1936 — Panama, Brazil
- Leucauge granulata (Walckenaer, 1841) — India, Sri Lanka, China, Indonesia (Sunda Is.) to Australia, French Polynesia
  - Leucauge granulata marginata Kulczyński, 1911 — New Guinea
  - Leucauge granulata rimitara Strand, 1911 — French Polynesia (Rimitara)
- Leucauge hasselti (Thorell, 1890) — Indonesia (Sumatra)
- Leucauge hebridisiana Berland, 1938 — Vanuatu
- Leucauge henryi Mello-Leitão, 1940 — Brazil
- Leucauge idonea (O. Pickard-Cambridge, 1889) — Guatemala to Brazil
- Leucauge ilatele Marples, 1955 — Samoa
- Leucauge insularis (Keyserling, 1865) — Australia (Lord Howe Is.), Samoa
- Leucauge iraray Barrion & Litsinger, 1995 — Philippines
- Leucauge isabela Roewer, 1942 — Equatorial Guinea (Bioko)
- Leucauge japonica (Thorell, 1881) — Japan
- Leucauge kibonotensis Tullgren, 1910 — East Africa
- Leucauge lamperti Strand, 1907 — Sri Lanka
- Leucauge lechei Strand, 1908 — Madagascar
- Leucauge lehmannella Strand, 1908 — Colombia
- Leucauge leprosa (Thorell, 1895) — Myanmar
- Leucauge levanderi (Kulczyński, 1901) — Ethiopia, Congo, South Africa
- Leucauge linyphia Simon, 1903 — Equatorial Guinea
- Leucauge liui Zhu, Song & Zhang, 2003 — China, Taiwan
- Leucauge loltuna Chamberlin & Ivie, 1938 — Mexico
- Leucauge lombokiana Strand, 1913 — Indonesia (Lombok, Banda Is.)
- Leucauge longimana (Keyserling, 1881) — Peru
- Leucauge longipes F. O. Pickard-Cambridge, 1903 — Mexico
- Leucauge longula (Thorell, 1878) — Myanmar, Indonesia (Sumatra) to New Guinea
- Leucauge macrochoera (Thorell, 1895) — Myanmar, Indonesia (Sumatra)
  - Leucauge macrochoera tenasserimensis (Thorell, 1895) — Myanmar
- Leucauge mahabascapea Barrion & Litsinger, 1995 — Philippines
- Leucauge mahurica Strand, 1913 — Papua New Guinea (Bismarck Arch.)
- Leucauge malkini Chrysanthus, 1975 — Solomon Is.
- Leucauge mammilla Zhu, Song & Zhang, 2003 — China
- Leucauge margaritata (Thorell, 1899) — Cameroon
- Leucauge mariana (Taczanowski, 1881) — Mexico, Hispaniola to Peru
- Leucauge medjensis Lessert, 1930 — Congo
- Leucauge mendanai Berland, 1933 — French Polynesia (Marquesas Is.)
- Leucauge meruensis Tullgren, 1910 — Tanzania
  - Leucauge meruensis karagonis Strand, 1913 — Ruanda
- Leucauge mesomelas (O. Pickard-Cambridge, 1894) — Mexico
- Leucauge moerens (O. Pickard-Cambridge, 1896) — Mexico, Central America, Puerto Rico
- Leucauge moheliensis Schmidt & Krause, 1993 — Comoros
- Leucauge nagashimai Ono, 2011 — Japan
- Leucauge nanshan Zhu, Song & Zhang, 2003 — China
- Leucauge nicobarica (Thorell, 1891) — India (Nicobar Is.)
- Leucauge nigricauda Simon, 1903 — Guinea-Bissau, Equatorial Guinea
- Leucauge nigrocincta Simon, 1903 — West Africa, São Tomé and Príncipe, Equatorial Guinea(Bioko)
- Leucauge nigrotarsalis (Doleschall, 1859) — Indonesia (Ambon)
- Leucauge obscurella Strand, 1913 — Central Africa
- Leucauge opiparis Simon, 1907 — São Tomé and Príncipe
- Leucauge papuana Kulczyński, 1911 — New Guinea
- Leucauge parangscipinia Barrion & Litsinger, 1995 — Philippines
- Leucauge pinarensis (Franganillo, 1930) — Cuba
- Leucauge polita (Keyserling, 1893) — Mexico, Guatemala
- Leucauge popayanensis Strand, 1908 — Colombia
- Leucauge prodiga (L. Koch, 1872) — Samoa
- Leucauge profundifoveata Strand, 1906 — East Africa
- Leucauge pulcherrima (Keyserling, 1865) — Colombia, French Guiana
  - Leucauge pulcherrima ochrerufa (Franganillo, 1930) — Cuba
- Leucauge pusilla (Thorell, 1878) — India (Andaman Is.), Indonesia (Ambon)
- Leucauge quadrifasciata (Thorell, 1890) — Indonesia (Nias Is.), Malaysia
- Leucauge quadripenicillata (Hasselt, 1893) — Indonesia (Sumatra)
- Leucauge regnyi (Simon, 1898) — Caribbean
- Leucauge reimoseri Strand, 1936 — Central Africa
- Leucauge roseosignata Mello-Leitão, 1943 — Brazil
- Leucauge rubripleura (Mello-Leitão, 1947) — Brazil
- Leucauge rubrotrivittata Simon, 1906 — India
- Leucauge ruwenzorensis Strand, 1913 — Central Africa
- Leucauge sabahan Dzulhelmi, 2016 — Borneo (Malaysia)
- Leucauge saphes Chamberlin & Ivie, 1936 — Panama
- Leucauge scalaris (Thorell, 1890) — Indonesia (Sumatra)
- Leucauge semiventris Strand, 1908 — Colombia
- Leucauge senegalensis Roewer, 1961 — Senegal
- Leucauge severa (Keyserling, 1893) — Brazil
- Leucauge signiventris Strand, 1913 — Central Africa
- Leucauge simplex F. O. Pickard-Cambridge, 1903 — Mexico
- Leucauge soeensis Schenkel, 1944 — Timor
- Leucauge speciosissima (Keyserling, 1881) — Peru
- Leucauge spiculosa Bryant, 1940 — Cuba
- Leucauge splendens (Blackwall, 1863) — Brazil
- Leucauge stictopyga (Thorell, 1890) — Indonesia (Sumatra)
- Leucauge striatipes (Bradley, 1876) — Australia
- Leucauge subadulta Strand, 1906 — Japan
- Leucauge subblanda Bösenberg & Strand, 1906 — Russia (Far East), China, Korea, Taiwan, Japan
- Leucauge subgemmea Bösenberg & Strand, 1906 — Russia (Far East), China, Korea, Japan
- Leucauge superba (Thorell, 1890) — Indonesia (Nias Is., Sumatra)
- Leucauge synthetica Chamberlin & Ivie, 1936 — Panama
- Leucauge taczanowskii (Marx, 1893) — French Guiana
- Leucauge taiwanica Yoshida, 2009 — Taiwan
- Leucauge talagangiba Barrion, Barrion-Dupo & Heong, 2013 — China
- Leucauge tanikawai Zhu, Song & Zhang, 2003 — China
- Leucauge tellervo Strand, 1913 — Central Africa
- Leucauge tengchongensis Wan & Peng, 2013 — China
- Leucauge tessellata (Thorell, 1887) — India to China, Vietnam, Laos, Taiwan, Indonesia (Moluccas)
- Leucauge thomeensis Kraus, 1960 — São Tomé and Príncipe
- Leucauge tredecimguttata (Simon, 1877) — Philippines
- Leucauge tristicta (Thorell, 1891) — India (Nicobar Is.)
- Leucauge tupaqamaru Archer, 1971 — Peru
- Leucauge turbida (Keyserling, 1893) — Brazil
- Leucauge uberta (Keyserling, 1893) — Brazil
- Leucauge undulata (Vinson, 1863) — Ethiopia, East Africa, Madagascar, Mauritius (Rodriguez)
- Leucauge ungulata (Karsch, 1879) — West, East Africa, Equatorial Guinea (Bioko), São Tomé and Príncipe
- Leucauge venusta (Walckenaer, 1841) (type) — Canada, USA
- Leucauge vibrabunda (Simon, 1896) — Indonesia (Java)
- Leucauge virginis (Strand, 1911) — Indonesia (Aru Is.)
- Leucauge viridecolorata Strand, 1916 — Jamaica
- Leucauge volupis (Keyserling, 1893) — Brazil, Paraguay, Argentina
- Leucauge wangi Zhu, Song & Zhang, 2003 — China
- Leucauge wokamara Strand, 1911 — Indonesia (Aru Is.)
- Leucauge wulingensis Song & Zhu, 1992 — China
- Leucauge xiaoen Zhu, Song & Zhang, 2003 — China
- Leucauge xiuying Zhu, Song & Zhang, 2003 — China, Laos
- Leucauge zizhong Zhu, Song & Zhang, 2003 — China, Laos

=== Leucognatha ===
Leucognatha Wunderlich, 1992

- Leucognatha acoreensis Wunderlich, 1992 (type) — Azores
- Leucognatha bilineata (Tullgren, 1910) — Kenya, Tanzania

== M ==
=== Mecynometa ===
Mecynometa Simon, 1894

- Mecynometa argyrosticta Simon, 1907 — West Africa, Congo
- Mecynometa gibbosa Schmidt & Krause, 1993 — Comoros
- Mecynometa globosa (O. Pickard-Cambridge, 1889) (type) — Guatemala to Brazil

=== Mesida ===
Mesida Kulczyński, 1911

- Mesida argentiopunctata (Rainbow, 1916) — Australia (Queensland)
- Mesida culta (O. Pickard-Cambridge, 1869) — India, Sri Lanka
- Mesida gemmea (Hasselt, 1882) — Myanmar to Indonesia (Java), Taiwan
- Mesida grayi Chrysanthus, 1975 — New Guinea
- Mesida humilis Kulczyński, 1911 (type) — New Guinea
- Mesida matinika Barrion & Litsinger, 1995 — Philippines
- Mesida mindiptanensis Chrysanthus, 1975 — New Guinea
- Mesida pumila (Thorell, 1877) — Indonesia (Sumatra) to New Guinea
- Mesida realensis Barrion & Litsinger, 1995 — Philippines
- Mesida thorelli (Blackwall, 1877) — Seychelles, Mayotte
  - Mesida thorelli mauritiana (Simon, 1898) — Mauritius
- Mesida wilsoni Chrysanthus, 1975 — New Guinea, Papua New Guinea (Bismarck Arch.)
- Mesida yangbi Zhu, Song & Zhang, 2003 — China
- Mesida yini Zhu, Song & Zhang, 2003 — China, Laos

=== Meta ===
Meta

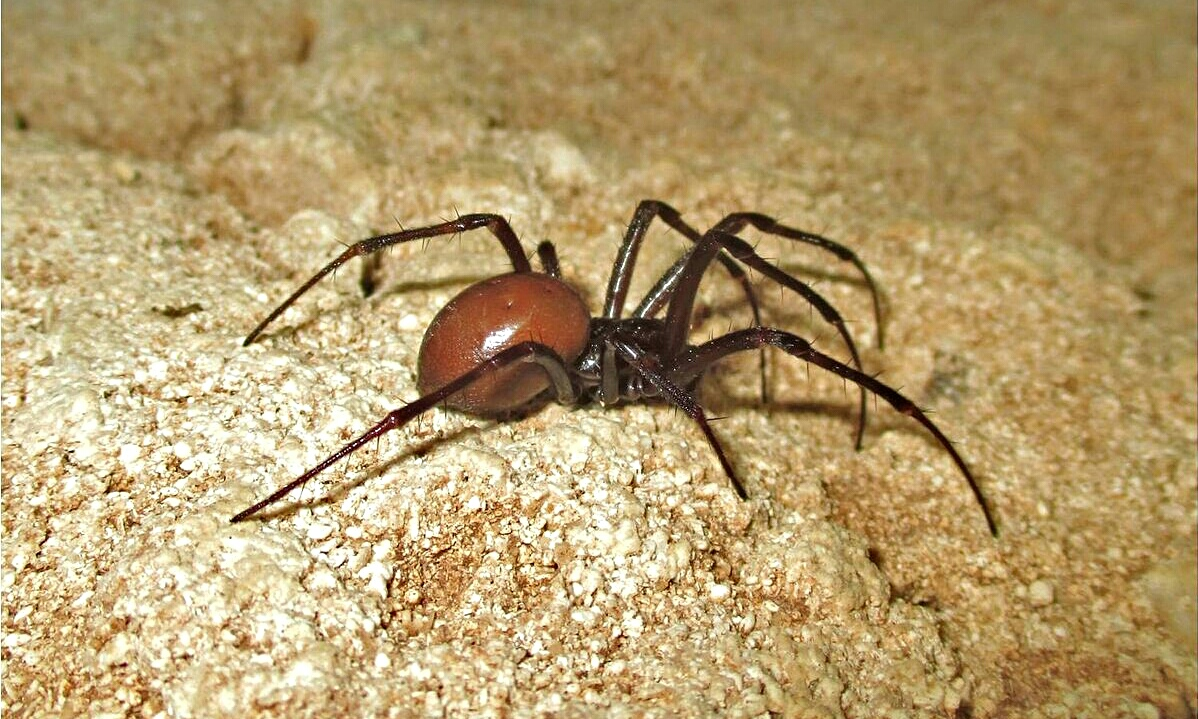
Meta bourneti, male

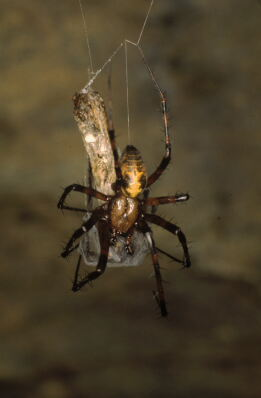
European cave spider
(Meta menardi)

Meta C. L. Koch, 1836

- Meta abdomenalis Patel & Reddy, 1993 — India
- Meta birmanica Thorell, 1898 — Myanmar
- Meta bourneti Simon, 1922 — Europe, Georgia, North Africa
- Meta dolloff Levi, 1980 — USA
- Meta hamata Wang, Zhou, Irfan, Yang & Peng, 2020 — China
- Meta japonica Tanikawa, 1993 — Japan
- Meta longlingensis Wang, Zhou, Irfan, Yang & Peng, 2020 — China
- Meta manchurica Marusik & Koponen, 1992 — Russia (Far East), Korea
- Meta menardi (Latreille, 1804) (type) — Europe, Turkey, Iran
- Meta meruensis Tullgren, 1910 — Tanzania
- Meta mixta O. Pickard-Cambridge, 1885 — China (Yarkand)
- Meta monogrammata Butler, 1876 — Australia (Queensland)
- Meta montana Hogg, 1919 — Indonesia (Sumatra)
- Meta nebulosa Schenkel, 1936 — China
- Meta nigridorsalis Tanikawa, 1994 — China, Japan
- Meta obscura Kulczyński, 1899 — Canary Is., Madeira
- Meta ovalis (Gertsch, 1933) — USA, Canada
- Meta qianshanensis Zhu & Zhu, 1983 — China
- Meta serrana Franganillo, 1930 — Cuba
- Meta shenae Zhu, Song & Zhang, 2003 — China
- Meta simlaensis Tikader, 1982 — India
- Meta stridulans Wunderlich, 1987 — Madeira
- Meta tangi >Wang, Zhou, Irfan, Yang & Peng, 2020 — China
- Meta turbatrix Keyserling, 1887 — Australia (New South Wales)
- Meta yani >Wang, Zhou, Irfan, Yang & Peng, 2020 — China
- Meta tangi >Wang, Zhou, Irfan, Yang & Peng, 2020 — China

=== Metabus ===
Metabus O. Pickard-Cambridge, 1899

- Metabus conacyt Álvarez-Padilla, 2007 — Mexico, Guatemala
- Metabus debilis (O. Pickard-Cambridge, 1889) — Mexico to Ecuador
- Metabus ebanoverde Álvarez-Padilla, 2007 — Guatemala, Dominican Rep.
- Metabus ocellatus (Keyserling, 1864) (type) — Mexico to French Guiana

=== Metellina ===
Metellina

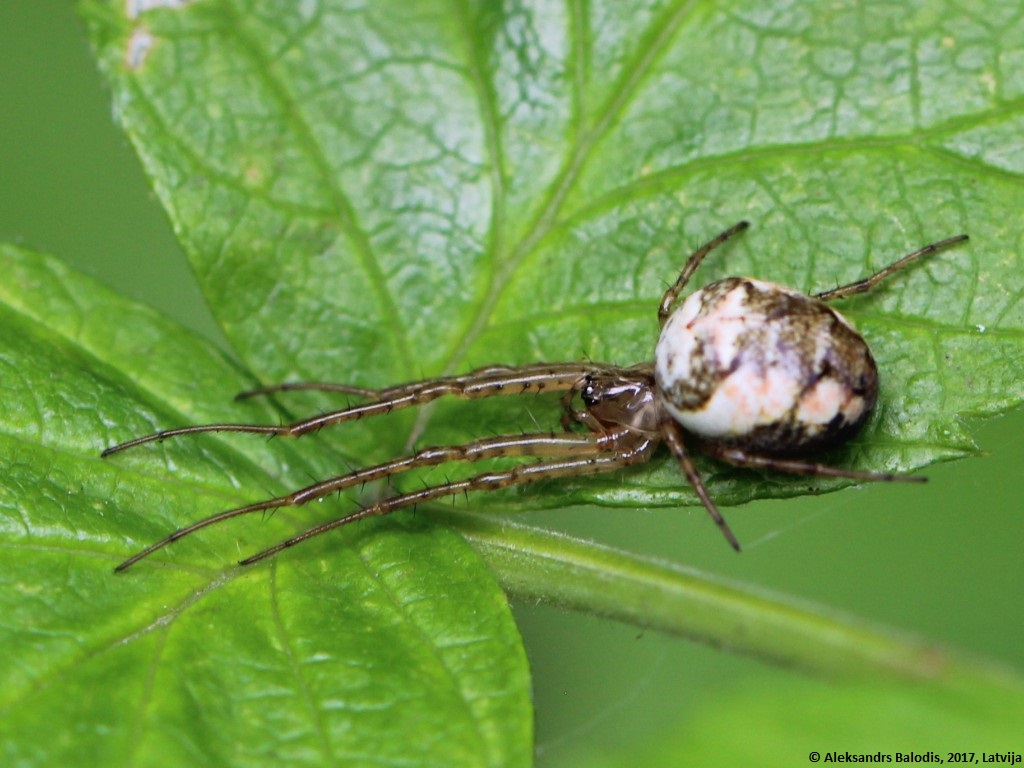
Metellina mengei

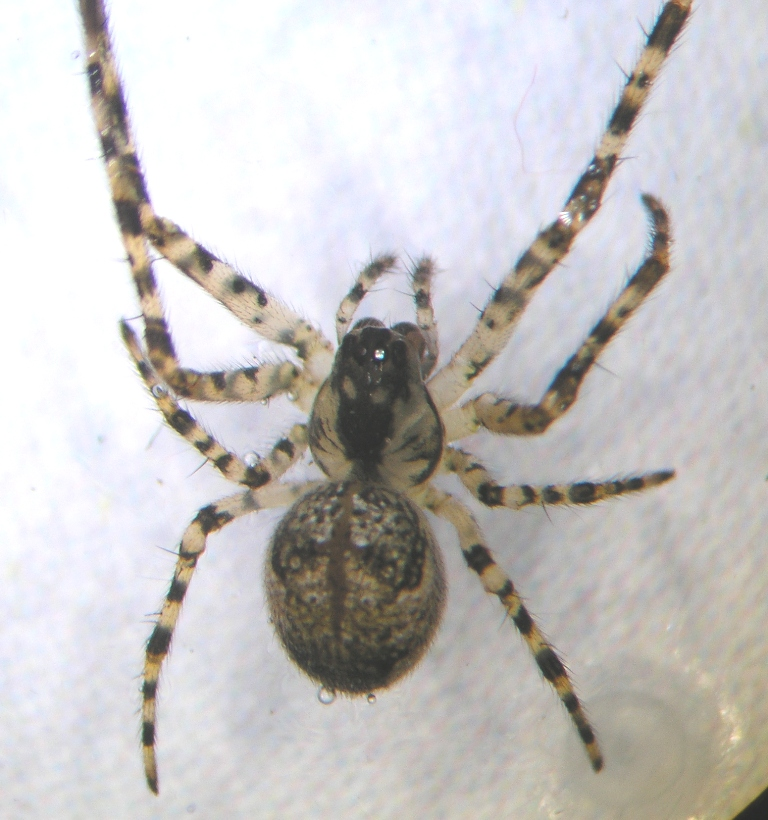
Metellina merianae

Metellina Chamberlin & Ivie, 1941

- Metellina barreti (Kulczyński, 1899) — Madeira
- Metellina curtisi (McCook, 1894) (type) — North America
- Metellina gertschi (Lessert, 1938) — DR Congo
- Metellina haddadi Marusik & Larsen, 2018 — South Africa
- Metellina kirgisica (Bakhvalov, 1974) — Azerbaijan, Central Asia, China
- Metellina longipalpis (Pavesi, 1883) — Ethiopia
- Metellina mengei (Blackwall, 1869) — Europe to Caucasus, Iran, Russia (Europe to Altai)
- Metellina merianae (Scopoli, 1763) — Europe, Caucasus, Turkey, Iran, Russia (Europe to Central Asia)
- Metellina merianopsis (Tullgren, 1910) — Tanzania
- Metellina mimetoides Chamberlin & Ivie, 1941 — North America
- Metellina minima (Denis, 1953) — Canary Is.
- Metellina orientalis (Spassky, 1932) — Turkey, Armenia, Iran, Kazakhstan, Turkmenistan
- Metellina ornata (Chikuni, 1955) — Russia (Far East), China, Korea, Japan
- Metellina segmentata (Clerck, 1757) — Europe, Turkey, Israel, Caucasus, Russia (Europe) to Central Asia, China, Japan. Introduced to Canada
- Metellina villiersi (Denis, 1955) — Guinea

=== Metleucauge ===
Metleucauge

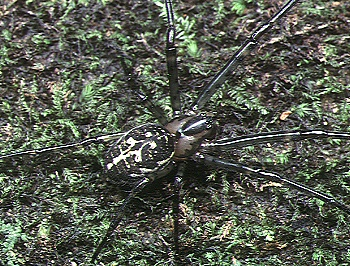
Metleucauge chikunii, female

Metleucauge Levi, 1980

- Metleucauge chikunii Tanikawa, 1992 — China, Korea, Taiwan, Japan
- Metleucauge davidi (Schenkel, 1963) — China, Taiwan
- Metleucauge dentipalpis (Kroneberg, 1875) — Central Asia
- Metleucauge eldorado Levi, 1980 (type) — USA
- Metleucauge kompirensis (Bösenberg & Strand, 1906) — Russia (Far East), China, Korea, Taiwan, Japan
- Metleucauge minuta Yin, 2012 — China
- Metleucauge yaginumai Tanikawa, 1992 — Japan
- Metleucauge yunohamensis (Bösenberg & Strand, 1906) — Russia (Far East), China, Korea, Taiwan, Japan

=== Mitoscelis ===
Mitoscelis Thorell, 1890

- Mitoscelis aculeata Thorell, 1890 (type) — Indonesia (Java)

=== Mollemeta ===
Mollemeta Álvarez-Padilla, 2007

- Mollemeta edwardsi (Simon, 1904) (type) — Chile

== N ==
=== Nanningia ===
Nanningia Zhu, Kim & Song, 1997

- Nanningia zhangi Zhu, Kim & Song, 1997 (type) — China

=== Nanometa ===
Nanometa Simon, 1908

- Nanometa dimitrovi Álvarez-Padilla, Kallal & Hormiga, 2020 — Australia (Queensland)
- Nanometa dutrorum Álvarez-Padilla, Kallal & Hormiga, 2020 — Australia (Tasmania)
- Nanometa fea Álvarez-Padilla, Kallal & Hormiga, 2020 — Papua New Guinea
- Nanometa forsteri Álvarez-Padilla, Kallal & Hormiga, 2020 — New Zealand
- Nanometa gentilis Simon, 1908 (type) — Australia (Western Australia)
- Nanometa hippai (Marusik & Omelko, 2017) — Papua New Guinea
- Nanometa lagenifera (Urquhart, 1888) — New Zealand
- Nanometa lehtineni (Marusik & Omelko, 2017) — Papua New Guinea
- Nanometa lyleae (Marusik & Omelko, 2017) — Papua New Guinea
- Nanometa padillai (Marusik & Omelko, 2017) — Papua New Guinea
- Nanometa purpurapunctata (Urquhart, 1889) — New Zealand
- Nanometa sarasini (Berland, 1924) — New Caledonia
- Nanometa tasmaniensis Álvarez-Padilla, Kallal & Hormiga, 2020 — Australia (Tasmania)
- Nanometa tetracaena Álvarez-Padilla, Kallal & Hormiga, 2020 — Australia (Victoria, New South Wales, Tasmania)
- Nanometa trivittata (Keyserling, 1887) — Australia (Queensland, New South Wales, Victoria)

=== Neoprolochus ===
Neoprolochus Reimoser, 1927

- Neoprolochus jacobsoni Reimoser, 1927 (type) — Indonesia (Sumatra)

== O ==
=== Okileucauge ===
Okileucauge

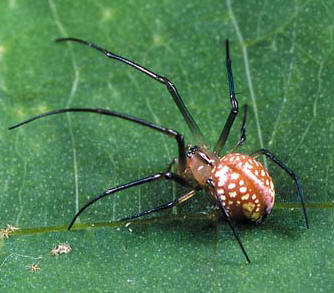
Okileucauge sasakii, female

Okileucauge Tanikawa, 2001

- Okileucauge elongatus Zhao, Peng & Huang, 2012 — China
- Okileucauge geminuscavum Chen & Zhu, 2009 — China
- Okileucauge gongshan Zhao, Peng & Huang, 2012 — China
- Okileucauge hainan Zhu, Song & Zhang, 2003 — China
- Okileucauge nigricauda Zhu, Song & Zhang, 2003 — China
- Okileucauge sasakii Tanikawa, 2001 — Japan
- Okileucauge tanikawai Zhu, Song & Zhang, 2003 — China
- Okileucauge tibet Zhu, Song & Zhang, 2003 — China
- Okileucauge yinae Zhu, Song & Zhang, 2003 — China

=== Opadometa ===
Opadometa

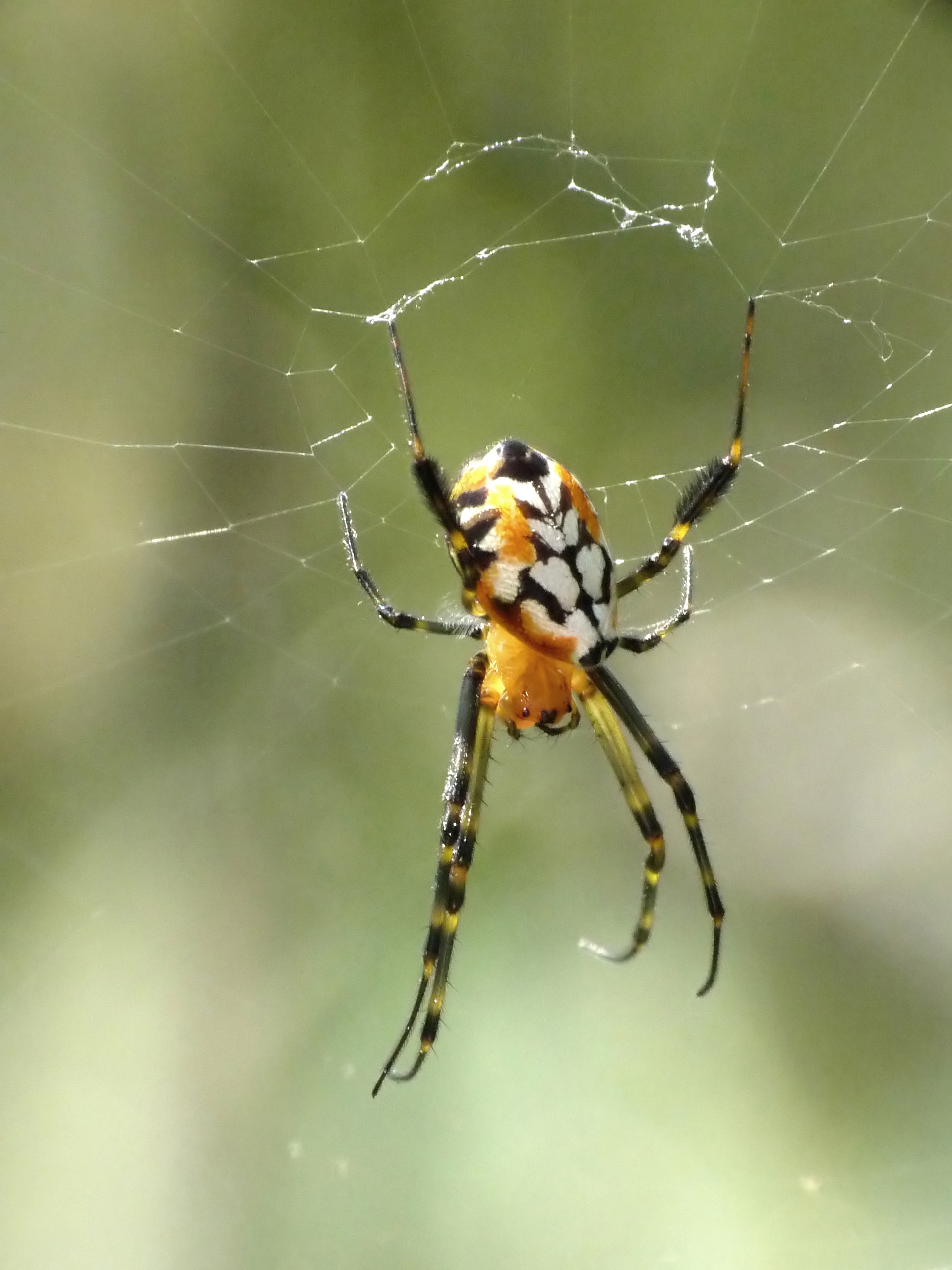
Pear shaped Leucauge
(Opadometa fastigata)

Opadometa Archer, 1951

- Opadometa fastigata (Simon, 1877) — India to Philippines, Indonesia (Sulawesi)
  - Opadometa fastigata korinchica (Hogg, 1919) — Indonesia (Sumatra)
- Opadometa grata (Guérin, 1838) (type) — Japan, Laos, Indonesia, New Guinea, Solomon Is.
  - Opadometa grata anirensis (Strand, 1911) — Papua New Guinea (Anir Is.)
  - Opadometa grata bukaensis (Strand, 1911) — Papua New Guinea (New Ireland), Solomon Is.
  - Opadometa grata maitlandensis (Strand, 1911) — Papua New Guinea (New Ireland)
  - Opadometa grata mathiasensis (Strand, 1911) — Papua New Guinea (St. Matthias Is.)
  - Opadometa grata salomonum (Strand, 1911) — Solomon Is.
  - Opadometa grata squallyensis (Strand, 1911) — Papua New Guinea (Squally Is.)
  - Opadometa grata tomaensis (Strand, 1911) — Papua New Guinea (New Britain)
- Opadometa kuchingensis Dzulhelmi & Suriyanti, 2015 — Borneo
- Opadometa sarawakensis Dzulhelmi & Suriyanti, 2015 — Malaysia (Borneo), Brunei

=== Opas ===
Opas O. Pickard-Cambridge, 1896 is now included in Leucauge.

=== Orsinome ===
Orsinome Thorell, 1890

- Orsinome armata Pocock, 1901 — India
- Orsinome cavernicola (Thorell, 1878) — Indonesia (Ambon)
- Orsinome daiqin Zhu, Song & Zhang, 2003 — China
- Orsinome diporusa Zhu, Song & Zhang, 2003 — China
- Orsinome elberti Strand, 1911 — Timor
- Orsinome jiarui Zhu, Song & Zhang, 2003 — China
- Orsinome lorentzi Kulczyński, 1911 — New Guinea
- Orsinome megaloverpa Kallal & Hormiga, 2018 — Philippines
- Orsinome monulfi Chrysanthus, 1971 — New Guinea
- Orsinome phrygiana Simon, 1901 — Malaysia
- Orsinome pilatrix (Thorell, 1878) — Indonesia (Ambon)
- Orsinome trappensis Schenkel, 1953 — China
- Orsinome vethi (Hasselt, 1882) (type) — India, China, Vietnam, Laos, Malaysia, Indonesia (Sumatra, Java, Flores)

== P ==
=== Pachygnatha ===
Pachygnatha

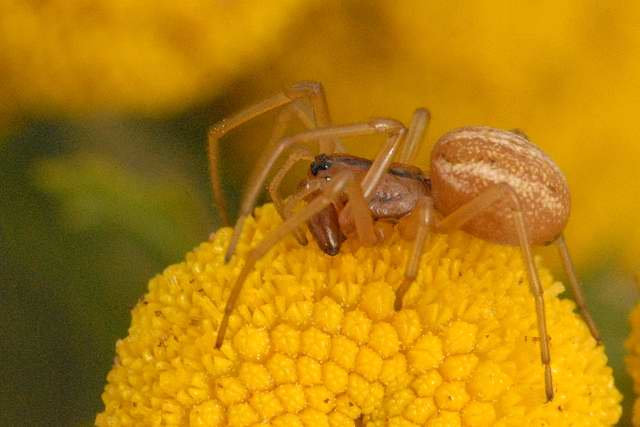
Pachygnatha clercki

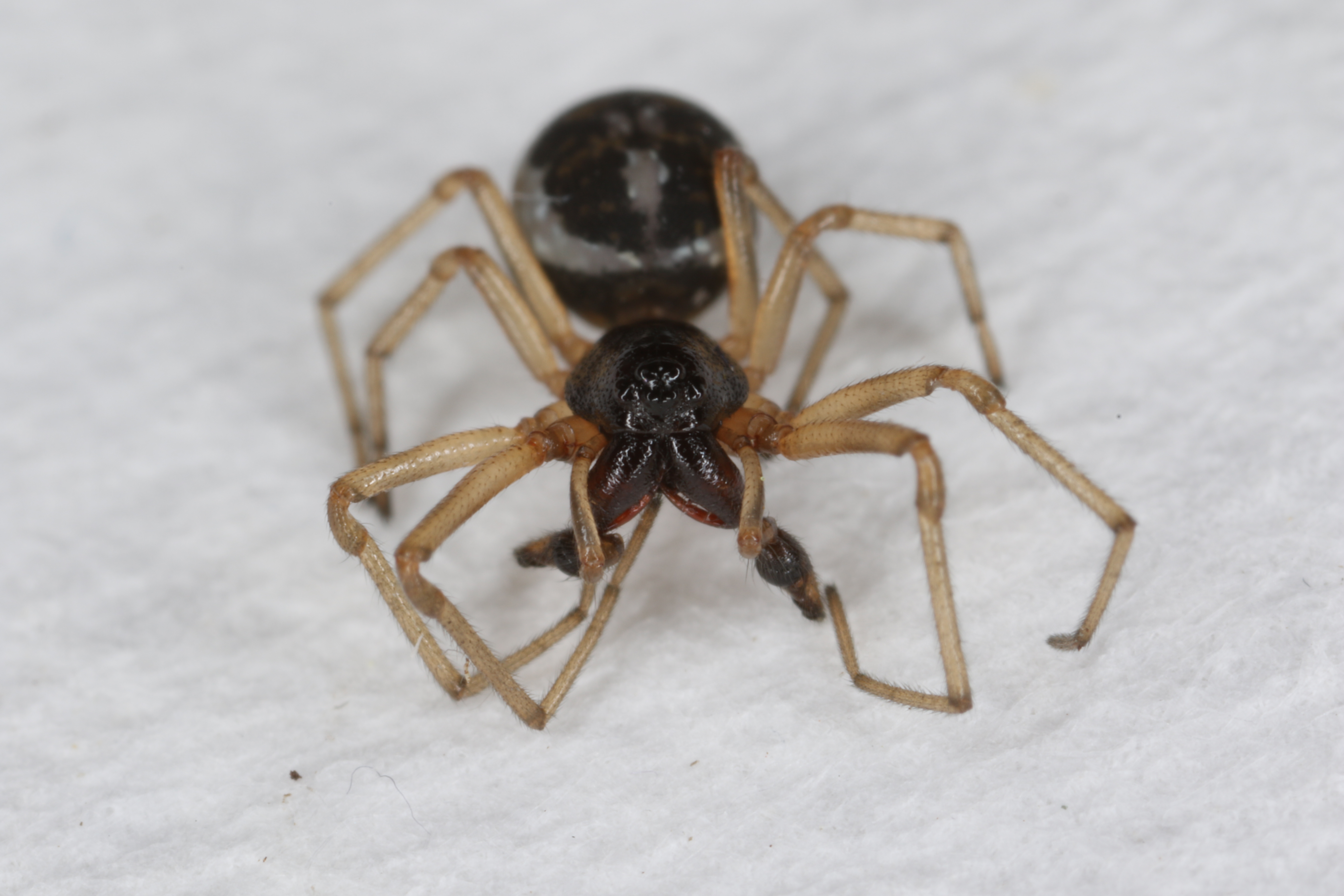
Pachygnatha degeeri

Pachygnatha Sundevall, 1823

- Pachygnatha amurensis Strand, 1907 — Russia (Far East), China
- Pachygnatha atromarginata Bosmans & Bosselaers, 1994 — Cameroon
- Pachygnatha autumnalis Marx, 1884 — USA, Canada, Cuba
- Pachygnatha bispiralis Nzigidahera & Jocqué, 2014 — Burundi
- Pachygnatha bonneti Senglet, 1973 — Spain
- Pachygnatha brevis Keyserling, 1884 — USA, Canada
- Pachygnatha calusa Levi, 1980 — USA
- Pachygnatha clercki Sundevall, 1823 (type) — North America, Europe, Caucasus, Russia (Europe to Far East), Central Asia, China, Korea, Japan
- Pachygnatha clerckoides Wunderlich, 1985 — Albania, Macedonia, Bulgaria, Russia (Europe)
- Pachygnatha degeeri Sundevall, 1830 — Europe, Turkey, Caucasus, Russia (Europe to Far East), Central Asia, China
  - Pachygnatha degeeri dysdericolor Jocqué, 1977 — Morocco
- Pachygnatha dorothea McCook, 1894 — USA, Canada
- Pachygnatha fengzhen Zhu, Song & Zhang, 2003 — China
- Pachygnatha furcillata Keyserling, 1884 — USA
- Pachygnatha goedeli Bosmans & Bosselaers, 1994 — Cameroon
- Pachygnatha hexatracheata Bosmans & Bosselaers, 1994 — Cameroon
- Pachygnatha intermedia Nzigidahera & Jocqué, 2014 — Burundi
- Pachygnatha jansseni Bosmans & Bosselaers, 1994 — Cameroon
- Pachygnatha kiwuana Strand, 1913 — Congo
- Pachygnatha leleupi Lawrence, 1952 — Cameroon, Congo, Malawi, Zimbabwe
- Pachygnatha listeri Sundevall, 1830 — Europe, Turkey, Caucasus, Russia (Europe to Far East), Kazakhstan
- Pachygnatha longipes Simon, 1894 — Madagascar
- Pachygnatha monticola Baba & Tanikawa, 2018 — Japan
- Pachygnatha mucronata Tullgren, 1910 — East Africa
  - Pachygnatha mucronata comorana Schmidt & Krause, 1993 — Comoros
- Pachygnatha ochongipina Barrion & Litsinger, 1995 — Philippines
- Pachygnatha okuensis Bosmans & Bosselaers, 1994 — Cameroon
- Pachygnatha opdeweerdtae Bosmans & Bosselaers, 1994 — Cameroon
- Pachygnatha palmquisti Tullgren, 1910 — Kenya, Tanzania
- Pachygnatha procincta Bosmans & Bosselaers, 1994 — Cameroon, Burundi, Kenya
- Pachygnatha quadrimaculata (Bösenberg & Strand, 1906) — Russia (Far East), China, Korea, Japan
- Pachygnatha rotunda Saito, 1939 — Japan
- Pachygnatha ruanda Strand, 1913 — Rwanda
- Pachygnatha simoni Senglet, 1973 — Spain
- Pachygnatha sundevalli Senglet, 1973 — Portugal, Spain
- Pachygnatha tenera Karsch, 1879 — Russia (Far East), China, Korea, Japan
- Pachygnatha terilis Thaler, 1991 — Switzerland, Austria, Italy
- Pachygnatha tristriata C. L. Koch, 1845 — USA, Canada
- Pachygnatha tullgreni Senglet, 1973 — Portugal
- Pachygnatha ventricosa Nzigidahera & Jocqué, 2014 — Burundi
- Pachygnatha vorax Thorell, 1895 — Myanmar
- Pachygnatha xanthostoma C. L. Koch, 1845 — USA, Canada
- Pachygnatha zappa Bosmans & Bosselaers, 1994 — Cameroon, Kenya, Malawi, South Africa
- Pachygnatha zhui Zhu, Song & Zhang, 2003 — China

=== Parameta ===
Parameta Simon, 1895

- Parameta jugularis Simon, 1895 (type) — Sierra Leone

=== Parazilia ===
Parazilia Lessert, 1938

- Parazilia strandi Lessert, 1938 (type) — Congo

=== Pholcipes ===
Pholcipes Schmidt & Krause, 1993

- Pholcipes bifurcochelis Schmidt & Krause, 1993 (type) — Comoros

=== Pickardinella ===
Pickardinella Archer, 1951

- Pickardinella setigera (F. O. Pickard-Cambridge, 1903) (type) — Mexico

=== Pinkfloydia ===
Pinkfloydia Dimitrov & Hormiga, 2011

- Pinkfloydia harveyi Dimitrov & Hormiga, 2011 (type) — Australia (Western Australia)
- Pinkfloydia rixi Hormiga, 2017 — Australia (New South Wales)

== S ==
=== Schenkeliella ===
Schenkeliella Strand, 1934

- Schenkeliella spinosa (O. Pickard-Cambridge, 1871) (type) — Sri Lanka

== T ==
=== Taraire ===
Taraire

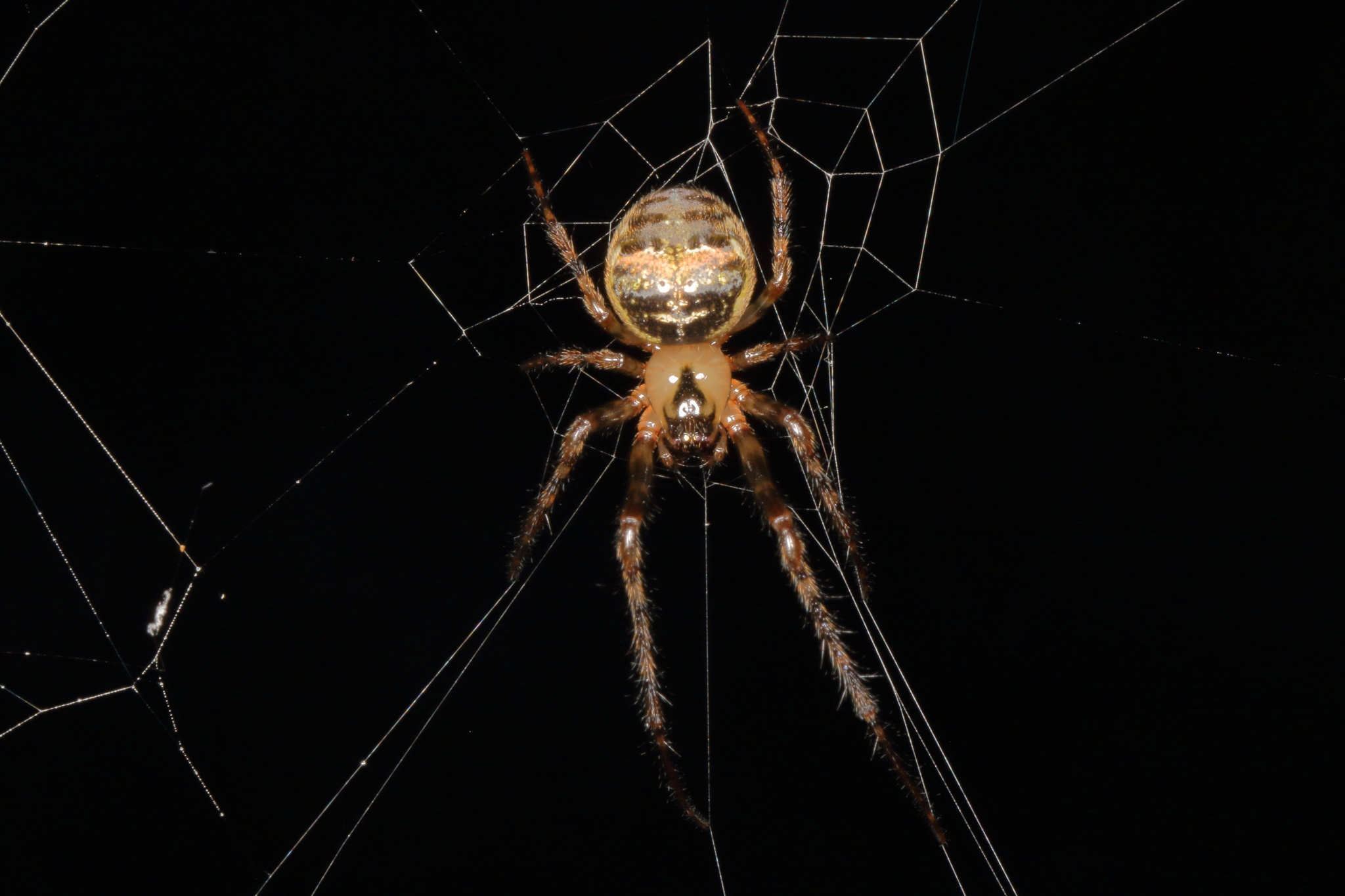
Taraire rufolineata

Taraire Álvarez-Padilla, Kallal & Hormiga, 2020

- Taraire oculta Álvarez-Padilla, Kallal & Hormiga, 2020 — New Zealand
- Taraire rufolineata (Urquhart, 1889) (type) — New Zealand

=== Tawhai ===
Tawhai Álvarez-Padilla, Kallal & Hormiga, 2020

- Tawhai arborea (Urquhart, 1891) (type) — New Zealand

=== Tetragnatha ===
Tetragnatha

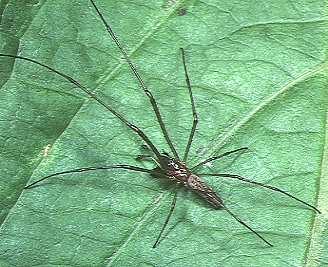
Tetragnatha praedonia, male

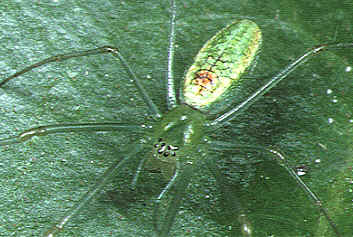
Tetragnatha squamata, female

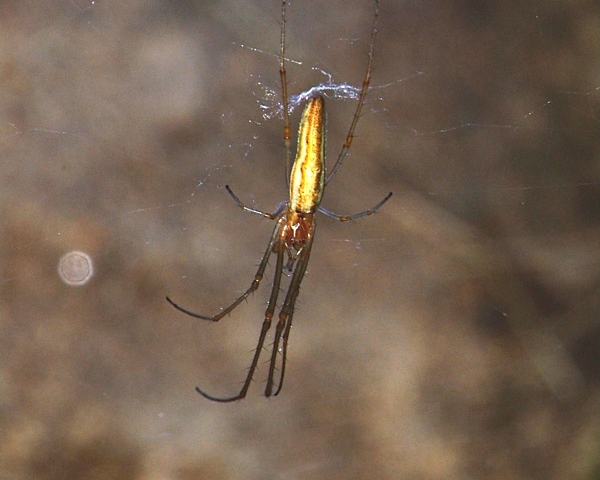
Tetragnatha striata

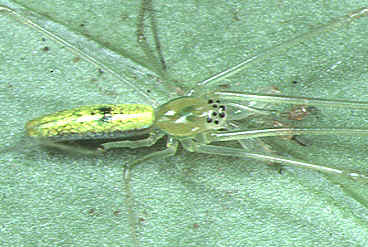
Tetragnatha tanigawai, male

Tetragnatha Latreille, 1804

- Tetragnatha acuta Gillespie, 1992 — Hawaii
- Tetragnatha aenea Cantor, 1842 — China
- Tetragnatha aetherea (Simon, 1894) — Venezuela
- Tetragnatha albida Gillespie, 1994 — Hawaii
- Tetragnatha americana Simon, 1905 — Chile, Argentina
- Tetragnatha amoena Okuma, 1987 — New Guinea
- Tetragnatha anamitica Walckenaer, 1841 — Vietnam
- Tetragnatha andamanensis Tikader, 1977 — India (Andaman Is.), Bangladesh
- Tetragnatha andonea Lawrence, 1927 — Namibia
- Tetragnatha angolaensis Okuma & Dippenaar-Schoeman, 1988 — Angola
- Tetragnatha anguilla Thorell, 1877 — Indonesia (Java, Sulawesi), New Guinea, Australia
- Tetragnatha angulata Hogg, 1914 — Australia (Western Australia)
- Tetragnatha anuenue Gillespie, 2002 — Hawaii
- Tetragnatha argentinensis Mello-Leitão, 1931 — Argentina
- Tetragnatha argyroides Mello-Leitão, 1945 — Argentina
- Tetragnatha armata Karsch, 1892 — Sri Lanka
- Tetragnatha atriceps Banks, 1898 — Mexico
- Tetragnatha atristernis Strand, 1913 — Central Africa
- Tetragnatha australis (Mello-Leitão, 1945) — Argentina
- Tetragnatha baculiferens Hingston, 1927 — Myanmar
- Tetragnatha bandapula Barrion-Dupo, Barrion & Heong, 2013 — China
- Tetragnatha beccarii Caporiacco, 1947 — Guyana
- Tetragnatha bengalensis Walckenaer, 1841 — India
- Tetragnatha bicolor White, 1841 — Australia (Tasmania)
- Tetragnatha bidentata Roewer, 1951 — Chile
- Tetragnatha biseriata Thorell, 1881 — New Guinea, Papua New Guinea (New Britain), Australia (Queensland)
- Tetragnatha bishopi Caporiacco, 1947 — Guyana
- Tetragnatha bituberculata L. Koch, 1867 — Japan, New Guinea, Australia
- Tetragnatha boeleni Chrysanthus, 1975 — New Guinea
- Tetragnatha bogotensis Keyserling, 1865 — Colombia
- Tetragnatha boninensis Okuma, 1981 — Japan
- Tetragnatha brachychelis Caporiacco, 1947 — Tanzania, Kenya
- Tetragnatha branda Levi, 1981 — USA
- Tetragnatha brevignatha Gillespie, 1992 — Hawaii
- Tetragnatha bryantae Roewer, 1951 — Puerto Rico
- Tetragnatha caffra (Strand, 1909) — South Africa
- Tetragnatha cambridgei Roewer, 1942 — Mexico, Central America, Puerto Rico
- Tetragnatha caudata Emerton, 1884 — North, Central America, Cuba, Jamaica
- Tetragnatha caudicula (Karsch, 1879) — Russia (Far East), China, Korea, Taiwan, Japan
- Tetragnatha caudifera (Keyserling, 1887) — Australia (New South Wales)
- Tetragnatha cavaleriei Schenkel, 1963 — China
- Tetragnatha cephalothoracis Strand, 1906 — Ethiopia
- Tetragnatha ceylonica O. Pickard-Cambridge, 1869 — South Africa, Seychelles, India, Thailand, Philippines, New Guinea, Japan (Ryukyu Is.)
- Tetragnatha chamberlini (Gajbe, 2004) — India
- Tetragnatha chauliodus (Thorell, 1890) — India, Myanmar to New Guinea, Japan
- Tetragnatha cheni Zhu, Song & Zhang, 2003 — China
- Tetragnatha chinensis (Chamberlin, 1924) — China
- Tetragnatha chiyokoae Castanheira & Baptista, 2020 — China, Taiwan, Japan
- Tetragnatha chrysochlora (Audouin, 1826) — Egypt
- Tetragnatha cladognatha Bertkau, 1880 — Brazil
- Tetragnatha clavigera Simon, 1887 — Sierra Leone, Ivory Coast, Congo
- Tetragnatha cochinensis Gravely, 1921 — India
- Tetragnatha coelestis Pocock, 1901 — India
- Tetragnatha cognata O. Pickard-Cambridge, 1889 — Guatemala to Panama
- Tetragnatha confraterna Banks, 1909 — Costa Rica, Panama
- Tetragnatha conica Grube, 1861 — Russia (Far East)
- Tetragnatha crassichelata Chrysanthus, 1975 — New Guinea
- Tetragnatha cuneiventris Simon, 1900 — Hawaii
- Tetragnatha cylindracea (Keyserling, 1887) — Australia (Queensland, New South Wales)
- Tetragnatha cylindrica Walckenaer, 1841 — New Guinea, Australia, Fiji
- Tetragnatha cylindriformis Lawrence, 1952 — Congo
- Tetragnatha dearmata Thorell, 1873 — North America, Europe, Caucasus, Russia (Europe to Far East)
- Tetragnatha delumbis Thorell, 1891 — India (Nicobar Is.)
- Tetragnatha demissa L. Koch, 1872 — Australia. Introduced to South Africa, Tanzania, Seychelles, Tonga
- Tetragnatha dentatidens Simon, 1907 — Sierra Leone, Congo
- Tetragnatha desaguni Barrion & Litsinger, 1995 — Philippines
- Tetragnatha determinata Karsch, 1892 — Sri Lanka
- Tetragnatha digitata O. Pickard-Cambridge, 1899 — Mexico, Costa Rica
- Tetragnatha eberhardi Okuma, 1992 — Panama
- Tetragnatha elongata Walckenaer, 1841 — North, Central America, Cuba, Jamaica
  - Tetragnatha elongata debilis Thorell, 1877 — USA
  - Tetragnatha elongata principalis Thorell, 1877 — USA
  - Tetragnatha elongata undulata Thorell, 1877 — USA
- Tetragnatha elyunquensis Petrunkevitch, 1930 — Jamaica, Puerto Rico
- Tetragnatha esakii Okuma, 1988 — Taiwan
- Tetragnatha eumorpha Okuma, 1987 — New Guinea
- Tetragnatha eurychasma Gillespie, 1992 — Hawaii
- Tetragnatha exigua Chickering, 1957 — Jamaica
- Tetragnatha exquista Saito, 1933 — Japan
- Tetragnatha extensa (Linnaeus, 1758) (type) — North America, Greenland, Europe, Turkey, Caucasus, Iraq, Russia (Europe to Far East), temperate Asia including China, Korea, Japan
  - Tetragnatha extensa brachygnatha Thorell, 1873 — Sweden, Russia (Kamchatka)
  - Tetragnatha extensa maracandica Charitonov, 1951 — Iran, Central Asia
  - Tetragnatha extensa pulchra Kulczyński, 1891 — Hungary
- Tetragnatha fallax Thorell, 1881 — Indonesia
- Tetragnatha farri Chickering, 1962 — Jamaica
- Tetragnatha filiciphilia Gillespie, 1992 — Hawaii
- Tetragnatha filipes Schenkel, 1936 — China
- Tetragnatha filum Simon, 1907 — Congo, Equatorial Guinea (Bioko), São Tomé and Príncipe
- Tetragnatha flagellans Hasselt, 1882 — Indonesia (Sumatra)
- Tetragnatha flava (Audouin, 1826) — Egypt
- Tetragnatha flavida Urquhart, 1891 — New Zealand
- Tetragnatha fletcheri Gravely, 1921 — India, Bangladesh
- Tetragnatha foai Simon, 1902 — Central, East Africa
- Tetragnatha foliferens Hingston, 1927 — India (Nicobar Is.)
- Tetragnatha foveata Karsch, 1892 — Sri Lanka, Laccadive Is., Maldive Is.
- Tetragnatha fragilis Chickering, 1957 — Panama
- Tetragnatha franganilloi Brignoli, 1983 — Cuba
- Tetragnatha friedericii Strand, 1913 — New Guinea
- Tetragnatha gemmata L. Koch, 1872 — Australia (Queensland)
- Tetragnatha geniculata Karsch, 1892 — Sri Lanka to China, Vietnam
- Tetragnatha gertschi Chickering, 1957 — Panama
- Tetragnatha gibbula Roewer, 1942 — French Guiana
- Tetragnatha gongshan Zhao & Peng, 2010 — China
- Tetragnatha gracilis (Bryant, 1923) — USA, Antigua, Martinique
- Tetragnatha gracillima (Thorell, 1890) — Indonesia (Sumatra)
- Tetragnatha granti Pocock, 1903 — Yemen (Socotra)
- Tetragnatha gressitti Okuma, 1988 — Borneo
- Tetragnatha gressittorum Okuma, 1987 — New Guinea
- Tetragnatha guatemalensis O. Pickard-Cambridge, 1889 — North, Central America, Cuba, Jamaica
- Tetragnatha gui Zhu, Song & Zhang, 2003 — China
- Tetragnatha hamata Thorell, 1898 — Myanmar
- Tetragnatha hasselti Thorell, 1890 — India to China, Indonesia (Sulawesi)
  - Tetragnatha hasselti birmanica Sherriffs, 1919 — Myanmar
- Tetragnatha hastula Simon, 1907 — Sierra Leone, Gabon, São Tomé and Príncipe
- Tetragnatha hawaiensis Simon, 1900 — Hawaii
- Tetragnatha heongi Barrion & Barrion-Dupo, 2011 — China
- Tetragnatha hirashimai Okuma, 1987 — New Guinea
- Tetragnatha hiroshii Okuma, 1988 — Taiwan
- Tetragnatha hulli Caporiacco, 1955 — Venezuela
- Tetragnatha insularis Okuma, 1987 — Australia (Lord Howe Is.)
- Tetragnatha insulata Hogg, 1913 — Falkland Is.
- Tetragnatha insulicola Okuma, 1987 — Australia (Lord Howe Is.)
- Tetragnatha intermedia Kulczyński, 1891 — Madeira, Portugal to Turkey
- Tetragnatha iriomotensis Okuma, 1991 — Japan (Okinawa)
- Tetragnatha irridescens Stoliczka, 1869 — India
- Tetragnatha isidis (Simon, 1880) — Europe, Caucasus, Russia (Europe to Far East), Kazakhstan to India
- Tetragnatha iwahigensis Barrion & Litsinger, 1995 — Philippines
- Tetragnatha jaculator Tullgren, 1910 — Africa to China, New Guinea. Introduced to Barbados, Trinidad
- Tetragnatha javana (Thorell, 1890) — Africa, Asia
- Tetragnatha jejuna (Thorell, 1897) — Myanmar
- Tetragnatha josephi Okuma, 1988 — India, Malaysia, Singapore
- Tetragnatha jubensis Pavesi, 1895 — Ethiopia
- Tetragnatha kamakou Gillespie, 1992 — Hawaii
- Tetragnatha kapua Gillespie, 2003 — Marquesas Is.
- Tetragnatha kauaiensis Simon, 1900 — Hawaii
- Tetragnatha kea Gillespie, 1994 — Hawaii
- Tetragnatha keyserlingi Simon, 1890 — Samoa, Fiji, Vanuatu
- Tetragnatha khanjahani Biswas & Raychaudhuri, 1996 — Bangladesh
- Tetragnatha kikokiko Gillespie, 2002 — Hawaii
- Tetragnatha kiwuana Strand, 1913 — Central Africa
- Tetragnatha klossi Hogg, 1919 — Indonesia (Sumatra)
- Tetragnatha kolosvaryi Caporiacco, 1949 — Kenya
- Tetragnatha kukuhaa Gillespie, 2002 — Hawaii
- Tetragnatha kukuiki Gillespie, 2002 — Hawaii
- Tetragnatha labialis Nicolet, 1849 — Chile
- Tetragnatha laboriosa Hentz, 1850 — North, Central America
- Tetragnatha laminalis Strand, 1907 — East Africa
- Tetragnatha lancinans Kulczyński, 1911 — New Guinea
- Tetragnatha laochenga Barrion, Barrion-Dupo & Heong, 2013 — China
- Tetragnatha laqueata L. Koch, 1872 — Japan (Ogasawara Is.) to South Pacific Is.
- Tetragnatha latro Tullgren, 1910 — East Africa
- Tetragnatha lauta Yaginuma, 1959 — China (Hong Kong), Korea, Laos, Taiwan, Japan
- Tetragnatha lea Bösenberg & Strand, 1906 — Russia (Far East), Japan, Korea?
- Tetragnatha lena Gillespie, 2003 — Hawaii
- Tetragnatha lepida Rainbow, 1916 — Australia (Queensland)
- Tetragnatha levii Okuma, 1992 — Mexico
- Tetragnatha lewisi Chickering, 1962 — Jamaica
- Tetragnatha limu Gillespie, 2003 — Hawaii
- Tetragnatha linearis Nicolet, 1849 — Colombia, Chile
- Tetragnatha lineatula Roewer, 1942 — Malaysia
- Tetragnatha linyphioides Karsch, 1878 — Mozambique
- Tetragnatha llavaca Barrion & Litsinger, 1995 — Philippines
- Tetragnatha longidens Mello-Leitão, 1945 — Argentina, Brazil
- Tetragnatha luculenta Simon, 1907 — Guinea-Bissau
- Tetragnatha luteocincta Simon, 1908 — Australia (Western Australia)
- Tetragnatha mabelae Chickering, 1957 — Panama, Trinidad
- Tetragnatha macilenta L. Koch, 1872 — Australia (Norfolk Is.) to French Polynesia (Society Is.)
- Tetragnatha macracantha Gillespie, 1992 — Hawaii
- Tetragnatha macrops Simon, 1907 — São Tomé and Príncipe
- Tetragnatha maculata Blackwall, 1865 — Cape Verde Is.
- Tetragnatha maeandrata Simon, 1908 — Australia (Western Australia)
- Tetragnatha maka Gillespie, 1994 — Hawaii
- Tetragnatha makiharai Okuma, 1977 — Russia (Far East), Japan (mainland, Ryukyu Is.)
- Tetragnatha mandibulata Walckenaer, 1841 — West Africa, India to Philippines, Australia
- Tetragnatha maralba Roberts, 1983 — Seychelles (Aldabra)
- Tetragnatha margaritata L. Koch, 1872 — Australia (Queensland)
- Tetragnatha marginata (Thorell, 1890) — Myanmar to New Caledonia
- Tetragnatha marquesiana Berland, 1935 — Marquesas Is.
- Tetragnatha martinicensis Dierkens, 2011 — Martinique
- Tetragnatha mawambina Strand, 1913 — Central Africa
- Tetragnatha megalocera Castanheira & Baptista, 2020 — Brazil
- Tetragnatha mengsongica Zhu, Song & Zhang, 2003 — China
- Tetragnatha mertoni Strand, 1911 — Indonesia (Aru Is.)
- Tetragnatha mexicana Keyserling, 1865 — Mexico to Panama
- Tetragnatha micrura Kulczyński, 1911 — New Guinea, Solomon Is.
- Tetragnatha minitabunda O. Pickard-Cambridge, 1872 — Syria, Lebanon, Israel
- Tetragnatha modica Kulczyński, 1911 — New Guinea
- Tetragnatha mohihi Gillespie, 1992 — Hawaii
- Tetragnatha montana Simon, 1874 — Europe, Turkey, Caucasus, Russia (Europe to Far East), Central Asia
  - Tetragnatha montana timorensis Schenkel, 1944 — Timor
- Tetragnatha monticola Okuma, 1987 — New Guinea
- Tetragnatha moua Gillespie, 2003 — Tahiti
- Tetragnatha moulmeinensis Gravely, 1921 — Myanmar
- Tetragnatha multipunctata Urquhart, 1891 — New Zealand
- Tetragnatha nana Okuma, 1987 — New Guinea
- Tetragnatha nandan Zhu, Song & Zhang, 2003 — China
- Tetragnatha nepaeformis Doleschall, 1859 — Indonesia (Java)
- Tetragnatha nero Butler, 1876 — Mauritius (Rodriguez)
- Tetragnatha netrix Simon, 1900 — Hawaii
- Tetragnatha nigricans Dalmas, 1917 — New Zealand
- Tetragnatha nigrigularis Simon, 1898 — Seychelles
- Tetragnatha nigrita Lendl, 1886 — Europe, Caucasus, Russia (Europe to Far East), Central Asia, China, Japan
- Tetragnatha niokolona Roewer, 1961 — Senegal
- Tetragnatha nitens (Audouin, 1826) — Asia. Introduced to the Americas, Madeira, Canary Is., Europe, Egypt, Madagascar, Pacific islands, New Zealand
- Tetragnatha nitidiuscula Simon, 1907 — West Africa
- Tetragnatha nitidiventris Simon, 1907 — Guinea-Bissau
- Tetragnatha notophilla Boeris, 1889 — Peru
- Tetragnatha noumeensis Berland, 1924 — New Caledonia
- Tetragnatha novia Simon, 1901 — Malaysia
- Tetragnatha nubica Denis, 1955 — Niger
- Tetragnatha obscura Gillespie, 2002 — Hawaii
- Tetragnatha obscuriceps Caporiacco, 1940 — Ethiopia
- Tetragnatha obtusa C. L. Koch, 1837 — Europe, Turkey, Caucasus, Russia (Europe to Far East), Central Asia
  - Tetragnatha obtusa corsica Simon, 1929 — France (Corsica)
- Tetragnatha oculata Denis, 1955 — Niger
- Tetragnatha okumae Barrion & Litsinger, 1995 — Philippines
- Tetragnatha olindana Karsch, 1880 — Polynesia
- Tetragnatha oomua Gillespie, 2003 — Marquesas Is.
- Tetragnatha oreobia Okuma, 1987 — New Guinea
- Tetragnatha orizaba (Banks, 1898) — Mexico, Cuba, Jamaica
- Tetragnatha oubatchensis Berland, 1924 — New Caledonia
- Tetragnatha palikea Gillespie, 2003 — Hawaii
- Tetragnatha pallescens F. O. Pickard-Cambridge, 1903 — North, Central America, Caribbean
- Tetragnatha pallida O. Pickard-Cambridge, 1889 — Costa Rica, Panama
- Tetragnatha paludicola Gillespie, 1992 — Hawaii
- Tetragnatha paludis Caporiacco, 1940 — Ethiopia
- Tetragnatha panopea L. Koch, 1872 — Samoan islands
- Tetragnatha papuana Kulczyński, 1911 — New Guinea
- Tetragnatha paradisea Pocock, 1901 — India
- Tetragnatha paradoxa Okuma, 1992 — Costa Rica
- Tetragnatha paraguayensis (Mello-Leitão, 1939) — Paraguay
- Tetragnatha parva Badcock, 1932 — Paraguay
- Tetragnatha parvula Thorell, 1891 — India (Nicobar Is.)
- Tetragnatha paschae Berland, 1924 — Easter Is.
- Tetragnatha perkinsi Simon, 1900 — Hawaii
- Tetragnatha perreirai Gillespie, 1992 — Hawaii
- Tetragnatha phaeodactyla Kulczyński, 1911 — New Guinea
- Tetragnatha pilosa Gillespie, 1992 — Hawaii
- Tetragnatha pinicola L. Koch, 1870 — Europe, Turkey, Caucasus, Russia (Europe to Far East), Central Asia, China, Korea, Japan
- Tetragnatha piscatoria Simon, 1898 — Caribbean
- Tetragnatha planata Karsch, 1892 — Sri Lanka
- Tetragnatha plena Chamberlin, 1924 — China
- Tetragnatha polychromata Gillespie, 1992 — Hawaii
- Tetragnatha praedonia L. Koch, 1878 — Russia (Far East), China, Laos, Korea, Taiwan, Japan
- Tetragnatha priamus Okuma, 1987 — Solomon Is.
- Tetragnatha protensa Walckenaer, 1841 — Madagascar to Australia, New Caledonia, Palau Is.
- Tetragnatha pseudonitens Barrion, Barrion-Dupo & Heong, 2013 — China
- Tetragnatha puella Thorell, 1895 — Myanmar, Indonesia (Sumatra), New Guinea
- Tetragnatha pulchella Thorell, 1877 — Indonesia (Sumatra, Sulawesi
- Tetragnatha punua Gillespie, 2003 — Marquesas Is.
- Tetragnatha quadrinotata Urquhart, 1893 — Australia (Tasmania)
- Tetragnatha quasimodo Gillespie, 1992 — Hawaii
- Tetragnatha quechua Chamberlin, 1916 — Peru
- Tetragnatha radiata Chrysanthus, 1975 — New Guinea
- Tetragnatha ramboi Mello-Leitão, 1943 — Brazil
- Tetragnatha rava Gillespie, 2003 — Tahiti
- Tetragnatha reimoseri (Rosca, 1939) — Central, Eastern Europe
- Tetragnatha renatoi Castanheira & Baptista, 2020 — Venezuela, Brazil, Argentina
- Tetragnatha reni Zhu, Song & Zhang, 2003 — China
- Tetragnatha restricta Simon, 1900 — Hawaii
- Tetragnatha retinens Chamberlin, 1924 — China
- Tetragnatha rimandoi Barrion, 1998 — Philippines
- Tetragnatha rimitarae Strand, 1911 — Polynesia
- Tetragnatha riveti Berland, 1913 — Ecuador
- Tetragnatha roeweri Caporiacco, 1949 — Kenya
- Tetragnatha rossi Chrysanthus, 1975 — New Guinea
- Tetragnatha rouxi (Berland, 1924) — New Caledonia
- Tetragnatha rubriventris Doleschall, 1857 — New Guinea, Australia (Queensland)
- Tetragnatha scopus Chamberlin, 1916 — Peru
- Tetragnatha serra Doleschall, 1857 — Thailand to China (Hong Kong), New Guinea
- Tetragnatha shanghaiensis Strand, 1907 — China
- Tetragnatha shinanoensis Okuma & Chikuni, 1978 — Korea, Japan
- Tetragnatha shoshone Levi, 1981 — USA, Canada, Europe, Kazakhstan, Mongolia, China
- Tetragnatha sidama Caporiacco, 1940 — Ethiopia
- Tetragnatha signata Okuma, 1987 — New Guinea
- Tetragnatha similis Nicolet, 1849 — Chile
- Tetragnatha simintina Roewer, 1961 — Senegal
- Tetragnatha sinuosa Chickering, 1957 — Panama
- Tetragnatha sobrina Simon, 1900 — Hawaii
- Tetragnatha sociella Chamberlin, 1924 — China
- Tetragnatha squamata Karsch, 1879 — Russia (Far East), China, Korea, Taiwan, Japan
- Tetragnatha stelarobusta Gillespie, 1992 — Hawaii
- Tetragnatha stellarum Chrysanthus, 1975 — New Guinea
- Tetragnatha sternalis Nicolet, 1849 — Chile
- Tetragnatha stimulifera Simon, 1907 — Congo
- Tetragnatha straminea Emerton, 1884 — USA, Canada, Cuba
- Tetragnatha strandi Lessert, 1915 — East, Southern Africa
  - Tetragnatha strandi melanogaster Schmidt & Krause, 1993 — Comoros
- Tetragnatha streichi Strand, 1907 — China
- Tetragnatha striata L. Koch, 1862 — Europe, Russia (Europe to south Siberia), Kazakhstan
- Tetragnatha subclavigera Strand, 1907 — Congo
- Tetragnatha subesakii Zhu, Song & Zhang, 2003 — China
- Tetragnatha subextensa Petrunkevitch, 1930 — Jamaica, Puerto Rico
- Tetragnatha subsquamata Okuma, 1985 — Tanzania, South Africa
- Tetragnatha suoan Zhu, Song & Zhang, 2003 — China
- Tetragnatha sutherlandi Gravely, 1921 — India
- Tetragnatha tahuata Gillespie, 2003 — Marquesas Is.
- Tetragnatha tanigawai Okuma, 1988 — Japan (Ryukyu Is.)
- Tetragnatha tantalus Gillespie, 1992 — Hawaii
- Tetragnatha taylori O. Pickard-Cambridge, 1891 — South Africa
- Tetragnatha tenera Thorell, 1881 — India, Sri Lanka, Australia (Queensland)
- Tetragnatha tenuis O. Pickard-Cambridge, 1889 — Guatemala to Panama
- Tetragnatha tenuissima O. Pickard-Cambridge, 1889 — Mexico, Caribbean to Brazil
- Tetragnatha tincochacae Chamberlin, 1916 — Peru
- Tetragnatha tipula (Simon, 1894) — West Africa
- Tetragnatha tonkina Simon, 1909 — Vietnam
- Tetragnatha torrensis Schmidt & Piepho, 1994 — Cape Verde Is.
- Tetragnatha trichodes Thorell, 1878 — Indonesia
- Tetragnatha tristani Banks, 1909 — Costa Rica
- Tetragnatha trituberculata Gillespie, 1992 — Hawaii
- Tetragnatha tuamoaa Gillespie, 2003 — Society Is.
- Tetragnatha tullgreni Lessert, 1915 — Central, East Africa
- Tetragnatha uluhe Gillespie, 2003 — Hawaii
- Tetragnatha uncifera Simon, 1900 — Hawaii
- Tetragnatha unicornis Tullgren, 1910 — East, South Africa
- Tetragnatha vacillans (Butler, 1876) — Mauritius (Rodriguez)
- Tetragnatha valida Keyserling, 1887 — Australia (Queensland, New South Wales, Tasmania)
- Tetragnatha vermiformis Emerton, 1884 — Temperate and tropical Asia. Introduced to North and Central America
- Tetragnatha versicolor Walckenaer, 1841 — North, Central America, Cuba
- Tetragnatha virescens Okuma, 1979 — Bangladesh, Sri Lanka to Indonesia, Philippines
- Tetragnatha viridis Walckenaer, 1841 — USA, Canada
- Tetragnatha viridorufa Gravely, 1921 — India
- Tetragnatha visenda Chickering, 1957 — Jamaica
- Tetragnatha waikamoi Gillespie, 1992 — Hawaii
- Tetragnatha yalom Chrysanthus, 1975 — New Guinea, Papua New Guinea (Bismarck Arch.), Australia (Queensland)
- Tetragnatha yesoensis Saito, 1934 — Russia (Far East), China, Korea, Japan
- Tetragnatha yinae Zhao & Peng, 2010 — China
- Tetragnatha yongquiang Zhu, Song & Zhang, 2003 — China
- Tetragnatha zangherii (Caporiacco, 1926) — Italy
- Tetragnatha zhaoi Zhu, Song & Zhang, 2003 — China
- Tetragnatha zhaoya Zhu, Song & Zhang, 2003 — China
- Tetragnatha zhuzhenrongi Barrion, Barrion-Dupo & Heong, 2013 — China

=== Timonoe ===
Timonoe Thorell, 1898

- Timonoe argenteozonata Thorell, 1898 (type) — Myanmar

=== Tylorida ===
Tylorida

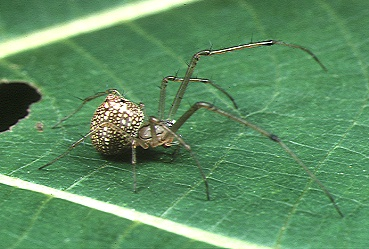
Tylorida striata, female

Tylorida Simon, 1894

- Tylorida flava Sankaran, Malamel, Joseph & Sebastian, 2017 — India
- Tylorida marmorea (Pocock, 1901) — India, China
- Tylorida mengla Zhu, Song & Zhang, 2003 — China
- Tylorida mornensis (Benoit, 1978) — Seychelles
- Tylorida seriata Thorell, 1899 — West Africa, Cameroon
- Tylorida striata (Thorell, 1877) (type) — Comoros, India, China, SE Asia to Australia (Queensland)
- Tylorida tianlin Zhu, Song & Zhang, 2003 — China, Laos
- Tylorida ventralis (Thorell, 1877) — India to Taiwan, Japan, New Guinea

== W ==
=== Wolongia ===
Wolongia Zhu, Kim & Song, 1997

- Wolongia bicruris Wan & Peng, 2013 — China
- Wolongia bimacroseta Wan & Peng, 2013 — China
- Wolongia erromera Wan & Peng, 2013 — China
- Wolongia foliacea Wan & Peng, 2013 — China
- Wolongia guoi Zhu, Kim & Song, 1997 (type) — China
- Wolongia mutica Wan & Peng, 2013 — China
- Wolongia odontodes Zhao, Yin & Peng, 2009 — China
- Wolongia papafrancisi Malamel, Nafin, Sankaran & Sebastian, 2018 — India
- Wolongia renaria Wan & Peng, 2013 — China
- Wolongia tetramacroseta Wan & Peng, 2013 — China
- Wolongia wangi Zhu, Kim & Song, 1997 — China

== Z ==
=== Zhinu ===
Zhinu Kallal & Hormiga, 2018

- Zhinu manmiaoyangi Kallal & Hormiga, 2018 (type) — Taiwan
- Zhinu reticuloides (Yaginuma, 1958) — Korea, Japan

=== Zygiometella ===
Zygiometella Wunderlich, 1995

- Zygiometella perlongipes (O. Pickard-Cambridge, 1872) (type) — Israel
