= Tetragnatha vermiformis =

Vermiformis Long-jawed Spider

Scientific classification
- Kingdom: Animalia
- Phylum: Arthropoda
- Subphylum: Chelicerata
- Class: Arachnida
- Order: Araneae
- Infraorder: Araneomorphae
- Family: Tetragnathidae
- Genus: Tetragnatha
- Species: T. vermiformis

Binomial name
- Tetragnatha vermiformis Emerton, 1884

Synonyms
- Eugnatha vermiformis McCook, 1894; Eucta vermiformis Simon, 1894; Tetragnatha mackenziei Gravely, 1921; Tetragnatha shikokiana Yaginuma, 1960; Tetragnatha coreana Seo & Paik, 1981

Species of spider

Tetragnatha vermiformis is a species of spider in the family Tetragnathidae. It has a worldwide distribution and is commonly known as Vermiformis long-jawed spider.

== Distribution ==
Tetragnatha vermiformis occurs across temperate and tropical Asia and has been introduced to North and Central America and Africa. The species was originally described from Barro in Colorado. It has been introduced into South Africa, where it is known from four provinces and protected in four protected areas.

== Habitat and ecology ==
These spiders construct orb webs in grass. The species was very abundant in rice fields in Asia. In some locations, individuals can be abundant, covering everything with their silk threads. In South Africa, the species has been sampled from the Fynbos, Grassland, Indian Ocean Coastal Belt, and Savanna biomes, at altitudes ranging from 15 to 1364 m.

== Description ==
Both males and females are known. The species can be identified by the male pedipalp, chelicerae structures, eye pattern, lateral view of the abdomen, and epigynal plate in females.

== Conservation ==
Tetragnatha vermiformis is listed as Least Concern due to its wide geographical range spanning multiple continents. There are no significant threats to the species.

== Taxonomy ==
The species was revised by Okuma and Dippenaar-Schoeman in 1988. Both sexes are known. The species has had multiple synonyms from different regions that were later unified under this name.
