= Timonoe =

Scientific classification
- Kingdom: Animalia
- Phylum: Arthropoda
- Subphylum: Chelicerata
- Class: Arachnida
- Order: Araneae
- Infraorder: Araneomorphae
- Family: Tetragnathidae
- Genus: Timonoe; Thorell, 1898
- Species: T. argenteozonata

Binomial name
- Timonoe argenteozonata Thorell, 1898

Genus of spiders

Timonoe is a monotypic genus of Burmese long-jawed orb-weavers containing the single species, Timonoe argenteozonata. It was first described by Tamerlan Thorell from a female found in 1898, and it has only been found in Myanmar.
