= Antillognatha =

Scientific classification
- Kingdom: Animalia
- Phylum: Arthropoda
- Subphylum: Chelicerata
- Class: Arachnida
- Order: Araneae
- Infraorder: Araneomorphae
- Family: Tetragnathidae
- Genus: Antillognatha; Bryant, 1945
- Species: A. lucida

Binomial name
- Antillognatha lucida Bryant, 1945

Genus of spiders

Antillognatha is a monotypic genus of long-jawed orb-weavers containing the single species, Antillognatha lucida. It was first described by E. B. Bryant in 1945, and is found on Hispaniola.
