= Neoprolochus =

Scientific classification
- Kingdom: Animalia
- Phylum: Arthropoda
- Subphylum: Chelicerata
- Class: Arachnida
- Order: Araneae
- Infraorder: Araneomorphae
- Family: Tetragnathidae
- Genus: Neoprolochus; Reimoser, 1927
- Species: N. jacobsoni

Binomial name
- Neoprolochus jacobsoni Reimoser, 1927

Genus of spiders

Neoprolochus is a monotypic genus of Sumatran long-jawed orb-weavers containing the single species, Neoprolochus jacobsoni. It was first described by E. Reimoser in 1927, based on a male found on Sumatra.
