= Iamarra =

Scientific classification
- Kingdom: Animalia
- Phylum: Arthropoda
- Subphylum: Chelicerata
- Class: Arachnida
- Order: Araneae
- Infraorder: Araneomorphae
- Family: Tetragnathidae
- Genus: Iamarra; Álvarez-Padilla, Kallal & Hormiga, 2020
- Species: I. multitheca

Binomial name
- Iamarra multitheca Álvarez-Padilla, Kallal & Hormiga, 2020

Genus of spiders

Iamarra is a monotypic genus of Australian long-jawed orb-weavers containing the single species, Iamarra multitheca. It was first described by A. Álvarez-Padilla, R. J. Kallal and Gustavo Hormiga in 2020, and it has only been found in Australia.
