= Dianleucauge =

Scientific classification
- Kingdom: Animalia
- Phylum: Arthropoda
- Subphylum: Chelicerata
- Class: Arachnida
- Order: Araneae
- Infraorder: Araneomorphae
- Family: Tetragnathidae
- Genus: Dianleucauge; Song & Zhu, 1994
- Species: D. deelemanae

Binomial name
- Dianleucauge deelemanae Song & Zhu, 1994

Genus of spiders

Dianleucauge is a monotypic genus of Chinese long-jawed orb-weavers containing the single species, Dianleucauge deelemanae. It was first described by D. X. Song & M. S. Zhu in 1994, and is found in China.
