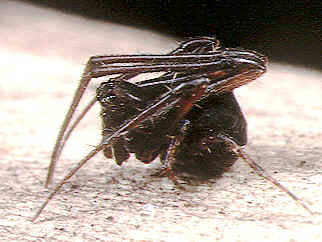
- Dolichognatha umbrophila

Scientific classification
- Domain: Eukaryota
- Kingdom: Animalia
- Phylum: Arthropoda
- Subphylum: Chelicerata
- Class: Arachnida
- Order: Araneae
- Infraorder: Araneomorphae
- Family: Tetragnathidae
- Genus: Dolichognatha
- Species: D. umbrophila

Binomial name
- Dolichognatha umbrophila Tanikawa, 1991

= Dolichognatha umbrophila =

Species of spider

Dolichognatha umbrophila is a species of long-jawed orb weaver in the spider family Tetragnathidae. It is found in Taiwan and Japan (Okinawa Islands).

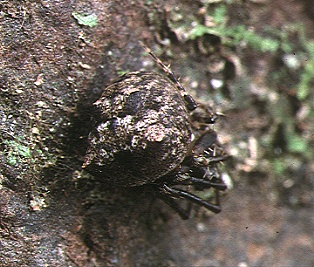
Dolichognatha umbrophila
