= Mitoscelis =

Scientific classification
- Kingdom: Animalia
- Phylum: Arthropoda
- Subphylum: Chelicerata
- Class: Arachnida
- Order: Araneae
- Infraorder: Araneomorphae
- Family: Tetragnathidae
- Genus: Mitoscelis; Thorell, 1890
- Species: M. aculeata

Binomial name
- Mitoscelis aculeata Thorell, 1890

Genus of spiders

Mitoscelis is a monotypic genus of long-jawed orb-weavers containing the single species, Mitoscelis aculeata. It was first described by Tamerlan Thorell in 1890 from a female found on Java.
