= Leucauge lamperti =

Scientific classification
- Kingdom: Animalia
- Phylum: Arthropoda
- Subphylum: Chelicerata
- Class: Arachnida
- Order: Araneae
- Infraorder: Araneomorphae
- Family: Tetragnathidae
- Genus: Leucauge
- Species: L. lamperti

Binomial name
- Leucauge lamperti Strand, 1907

Species of spider

Leucauge lamperti, is a species of spider of the genus Leucauge. It is endemic to Sri Lanka.
