= Hispanognatha =

Scientific classification
- Kingdom: Animalia
- Phylum: Arthropoda
- Subphylum: Chelicerata
- Class: Arachnida
- Order: Araneae
- Infraorder: Araneomorphae
- Family: Tetragnathidae
- Genus: Hispanognatha; Bryant, 1945
- Species: H. guttata

Binomial name
- Hispanognatha guttata Bryant, 1945

Genus of spiders

Hispanognatha is a monotypic genus of long-jawed orb-weavers containing the single species, Hispanognatha guttata. It was first described by E. B. Bryant in 1945 from a male found on Hispaniola.
