= Doryonychus =

Scientific classification
- Kingdom: Animalia
- Phylum: Arthropoda
- Subphylum: Chelicerata
- Class: Arachnida
- Order: Araneae
- Infraorder: Araneomorphae
- Family: Tetragnathidae
- Genus: Doryonychus; Simon, 1900
- Species: D. raptor

Binomial name
- Doryonychus raptor Simon, 1900

Genus of spiders

Doryonychus is a monotypic genus of Hawaiian long-jawed orb-weavers containing the single species, Doryonychus raptor. It was first described by Eugène Louis Simon in 1900, and is known only from the Hawaiian island of Kauai.
