= Schenkeliella =

Scientific classification
- Kingdom: Animalia
- Phylum: Arthropoda
- Subphylum: Chelicerata
- Class: Arachnida
- Order: Araneae
- Infraorder: Araneomorphae
- Family: Tetragnathidae
- Genus: Schenkeliella; Strand, 1934
- Species: S. spinosa

Binomial name
- Schenkeliella spinosa (O. Pickard-Cambridge, 1871)

Genus of spiders

Schenkeliella is a monotypic genus of Sri Lankan long-jawed orb-weavers containing the single species, Schenkeliella spinosa. The species was first described by Octavius Pickard-Cambridge in 1871 under the name Oeta spinosa, but it was renamed to "Schenkeliella" by Embrik Strand in 1934 because the name was already in use for a genus of ermine moths. Originally placed with the Nesticidae, it transferred to the Tetragnathidae in 1980.

== See also ==
- Ermine moth
