= Pholcipes =

Scientific classification
- Kingdom: Animalia
- Phylum: Arthropoda
- Subphylum: Chelicerata
- Class: Arachnida
- Order: Araneae
- Infraorder: Araneomorphae
- Family: Tetragnathidae
- Genus: Pholcipes; Schmidt & Krause, 1993
- Species: P. bifurcochelis

Binomial name
- Pholcipes bifurcochelis Schmidt & Krause, 1993

Genus of spiders

Pholcipes is a monotypic genus of Comorain long-jawed orb-weavers containing the single species, Pholcipes bifurcochelis. It was first described by Günter E. W. Schmidt & R. H. Krause in 1993, and is found on Comoros.
