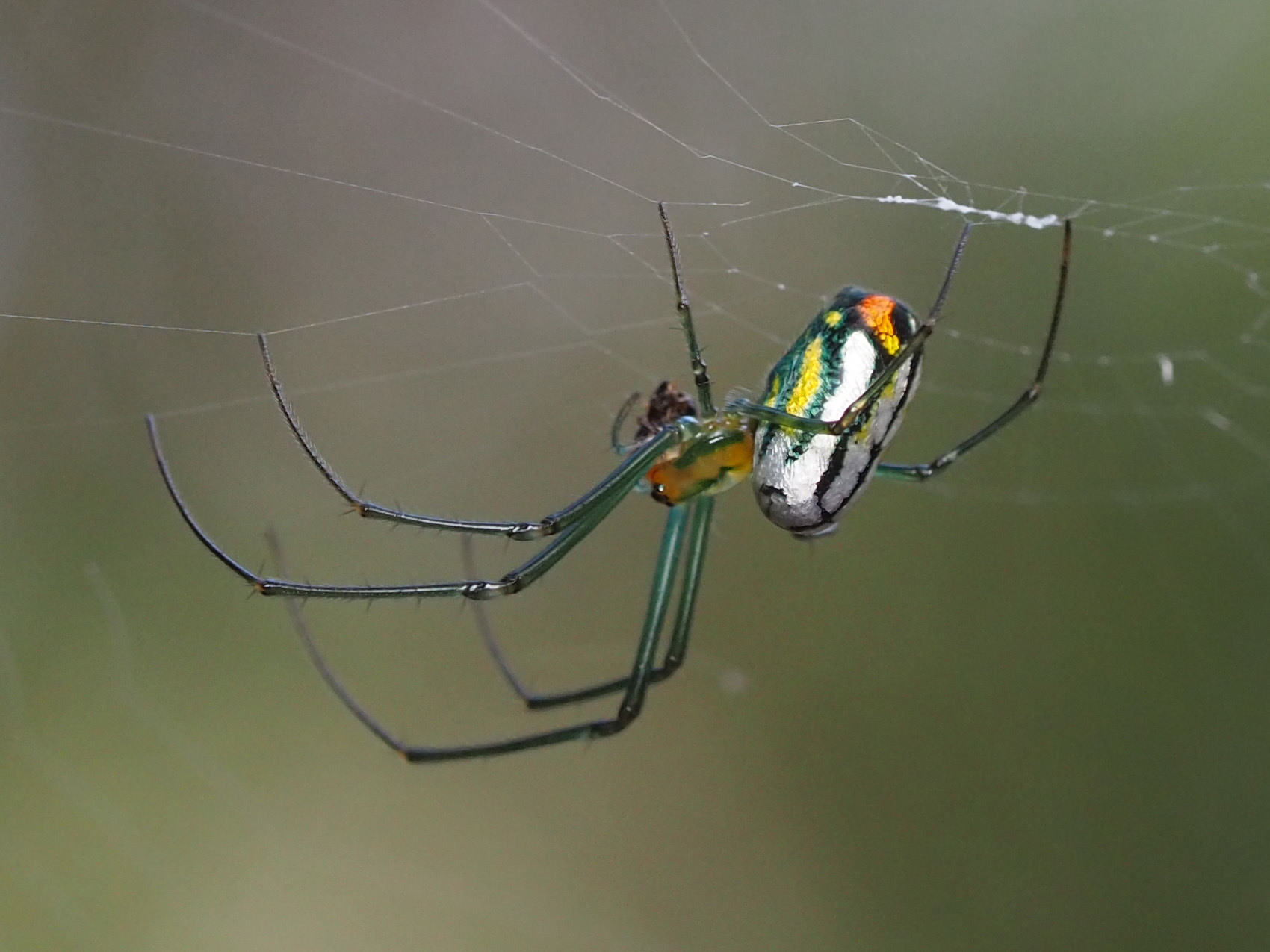
- Mabel's orchard orbweaver, Leucauge argyrobapta

Scientific classification
- Kingdom: Animalia
- Phylum: Arthropoda
- Subphylum: Chelicerata
- Class: Arachnida
- Order: Araneae
- Infraorder: Araneomorphae
- Family: Tetragnathidae
- Genus: Leucauge
- Species: L. argyrobapta

Binomial name
- Leucauge argyrobapta (White, 1841)

= Leucauge argyrobapta =

Species of spider

Leucauge argyrobapta, or Mabel's orchard orb weaver, is a species of long-jawed orb weaver in the spider family Tetragnathidae. It is found in Southern part of the USA, Mexico and Brazil, further testing must be done to see if it is found in more of Central and South America.

== Identification ==
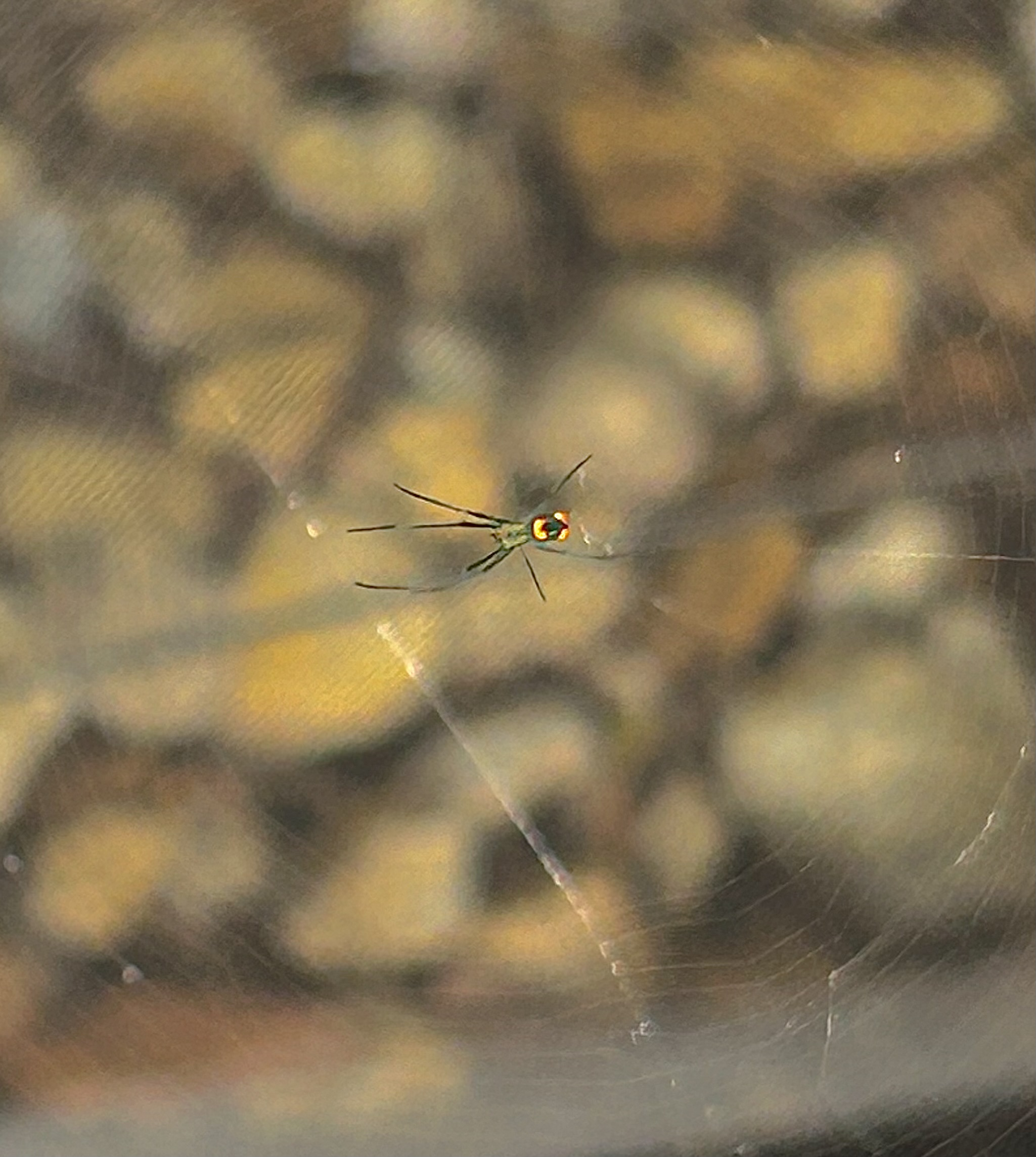
Top view of a Mabel's Orchard Orbweaver found in Florida

The males of this species differs from those of L. vetusta by the male palpal bulb, although some are easier to differentiate than others. Females of both of this species are practically identical, the main way to differentiate these species would be by the distribution. L. argyrobapta is found from the south of the USA (mainly Florida), all the way to Brazil. While L. vetusta is found from the North of the USA to Canada.

== Taxonomy ==
Adam White first described the Leucauge at the rank of subgenus, and the described the type species, then being Linyphia argyrobapta. This species was collected by Charles Darwin in 1832, in the Rio de Janeiro area. Though this specimen was lost after Whites publication.

The exact identity of this species remained a mystery, until Dimitrov and Hormiga searched for the species in 2010. Based on their findings they labeled L. argyrobapta as a synonym of L. venusta. They favored L. venusta as the species name, and since L. argyobapta was the type species, L. venusta became the type species.

With the new technology of sequencing they found a stunning difference between the genes of the Canadian and Northern USA specimens, compared to those found in Florida. And those of Florida and Brazil had a low genetic distance, even though the large geographic difference.

As such L. venusta is now used for the northern species, and L. argyrobapta is for the southern species. Removing them from synonymy in a 2017 study. Although a more thorough morphological analysis is needed to distinguished physically this two species. Though distribution can be used to distinguish this species, as they own little overlap.

== Etymology ==
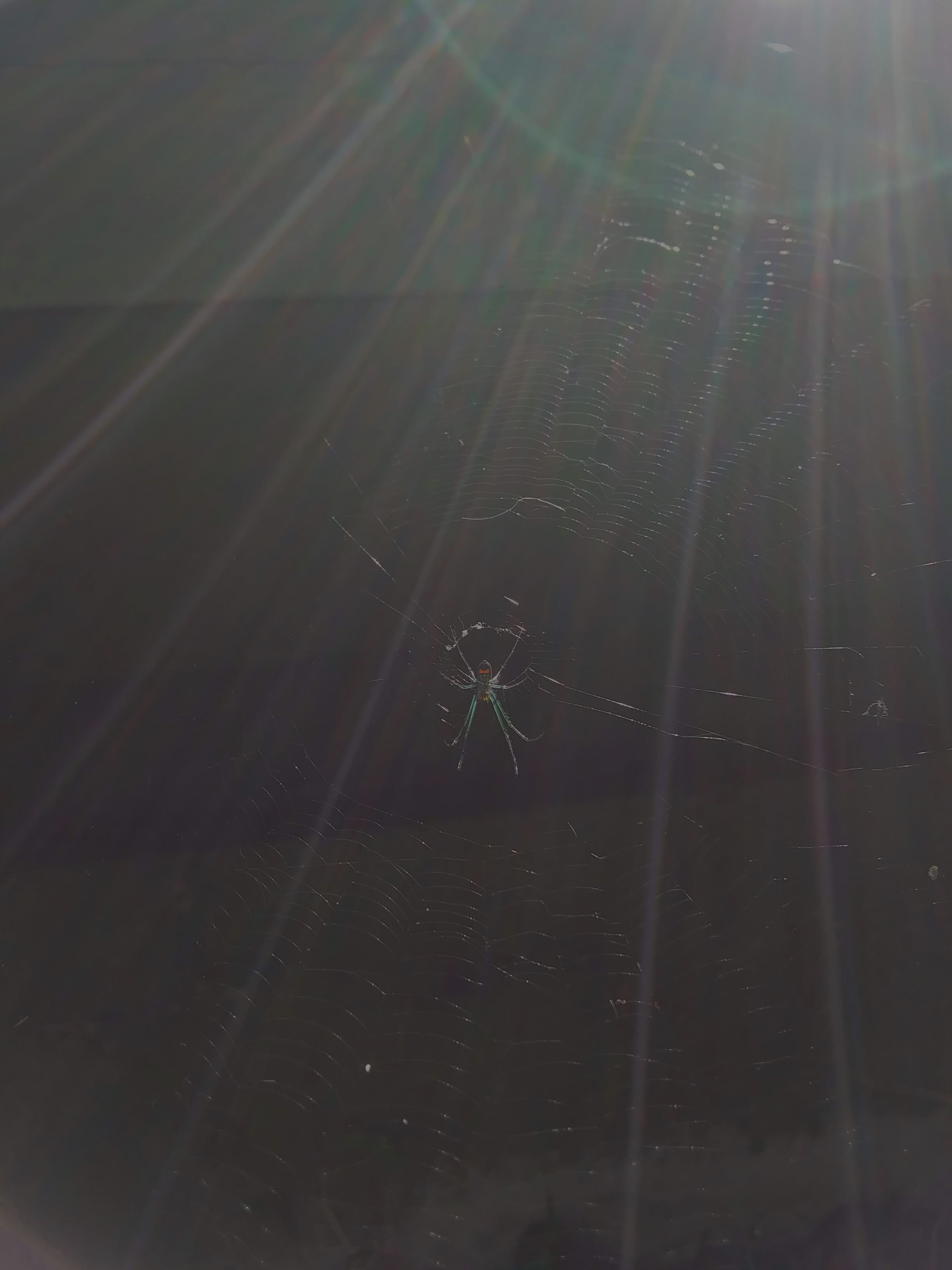
Leucauge argyrobapta at the centre of its web, South Carolina

The specific name is from Ancient Greek βάπτω (baptō, "to dip") and ἄργῠρος (argyros, "silver"), so called because the spider appears to have been "dipped" in silvery paint.
