= Nanningia =

Scientific classification
- Kingdom: Animalia
- Phylum: Arthropoda
- Subphylum: Chelicerata
- Class: Arachnida
- Order: Araneae
- Infraorder: Araneomorphae
- Family: Tetragnathidae
- Genus: Nanningia; Zhu, Kim & Song, 1997
- Species: N. zhangi

Binomial name
- Nanningia zhangi Zhu, Kim & Song, 1997

Genus of spiders

Nanningia is a monotypic genus of Chinese long-jawed orb-weavers containing the single species, Nanningia zhangi. It was first described by M. S. Zhu, J. P. Kim & D. X. Song in 1997, and has only been found in China.
