= Pickardinella =

Scientific classification
- Kingdom: Animalia
- Phylum: Arthropoda
- Subphylum: Chelicerata
- Class: Arachnida
- Order: Araneae
- Infraorder: Araneomorphae
- Family: Tetragnathidae
- Genus: Pickardinella; Archer, 1951
- Species: P. setigera

Binomial name
- Pickardinella setigera (F. O. Pickard-Cambridge, 1903)

Genus of spiders

Pickardinella is a monotypic genus of Mexican long-jawed orb-weavers containing the single species, Pickardinella setigera. The species was first described by Frederick Octavius Pickard-Cambridge under the name Leucauge setigera, and was moved to its own genus in 1951. Physically, they resemble members of Opadometa and Leucauge. Males are very small, only growing up to about 2 millimetres (0.079 in) long. A female has never been found.

== See also ==
- Leucauge
- Opadometa
