= Zygiometella =

Scientific classification
- Kingdom: Animalia
- Phylum: Arthropoda
- Subphylum: Chelicerata
- Class: Arachnida
- Order: Araneae
- Infraorder: Araneomorphae
- Family: Tetragnathidae
- Genus: Zygiometella; Wunderlich, 1995
- Species: Z. perlongipes

Binomial name
- Zygiometella perlongipes (O. Pickard-Cambridge, 1872)

Genus of spiders

Zygiometella is a monotypic genus of Asian long-jawed orb-weavers containing the single species, Zygiometella perlongipes. The species was first described by O. Pickard-Cambridge in 1872 under the name "Tetragnatha perlongipes", and it was transferred to its own genus in 1995.

It has been found in Israel and on Cyprus.
