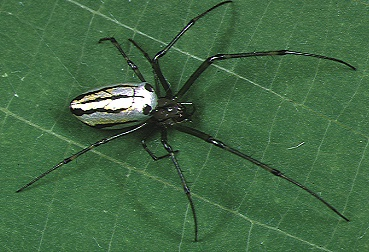
- female from Okinawa
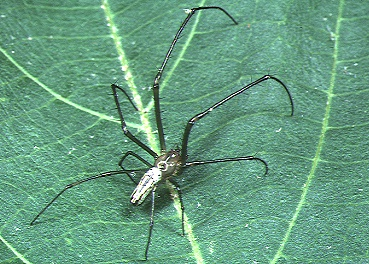
- male from Okinawa

Scientific classification
- Kingdom: Animalia
- Phylum: Arthropoda
- Subphylum: Chelicerata
- Class: Arachnida
- Order: Araneae
- Infraorder: Araneomorphae
- Family: Tetragnathidae
- Genus: Leucauge
- Species: L. blanda

Binomial name
- Leucauge blanda (L. Koch, 1878)

Synonyms
- Meta blanda L. Koch, 1878; Meta japonica Thorell, 1881; Leucauge blanda japonica Bösenberg & Strand, 1906; Leucauge szechuensis Schenkel, 1936

= Leucauge blanda =

Species of spider

Leucauge blanda is a species of orb weaver spider in the family Tetragnathidae. It was first described by Ludwig Koch in 1878 as Meta blanda.

== Distribution ==
L. blanda is widely distributed across East Asia, having been recorded from Russia (Far East), China, Korea, Taiwan, and Japan. In Japan, adults appear from summer to autumn.

== Habitat ==
The species inhabits open areas such as grasslands and fields, preferring more exposed locations compared to related species that favor forest environments.

== Description ==
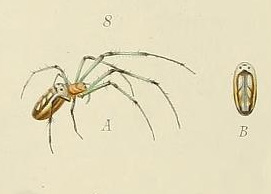
female from 1906 paper by Bösenberg & Strand

Leucauge blanda is a medium-sized orb weaver with males measuring 9-13 mm and females 6-10 mm in body length. The species can be distinguished from similar species such as Leucauge magnifica and Leucauge subgemmea by the presence or absence of tubercles on the shoulders of the male opisthosoma.

According to Koch's original description, the female has a brownish-yellow cephalothorax with narrow black lateral margins. The chelicerae are brownish-yellow with black tips and claws. The pedipalps are brownish-yellow with more strongly tanned tarsal segments. The legs are brownish-yellow with black joint tips. The opisthosoma is silvery-yellowish white above and on the sides, with two brown spots at the base and three brown longitudinal stripes extending to the spinnerets.

The cephalothorax is about 1.25 times longer than wide, rounded at the sides and very glossy. The anterior eye row is strongly recurved, with the median anterior eyes smaller than the posterior median eyes. The chelicerae are smooth and glossy, and the claws are strongly curved with three teeth on the front margin and four on the rear margin.

Males construct inclined orb webs among grass stems, similar to other Leucauge species.

== Taxonomy ==
The species has had several synonyms throughout its taxonomic history. It was originally described as Meta blanda by Koch in 1878, and later Meta japonica was described by Thorell in 1881. Bösenberg and Strand established Leucauge blanda japonica as a subspecies in 1906, which was later synonymized with the nominate form. Leucauge szechuensis, described by Schenkel in 1936, was also synonymized with L. blanda.
