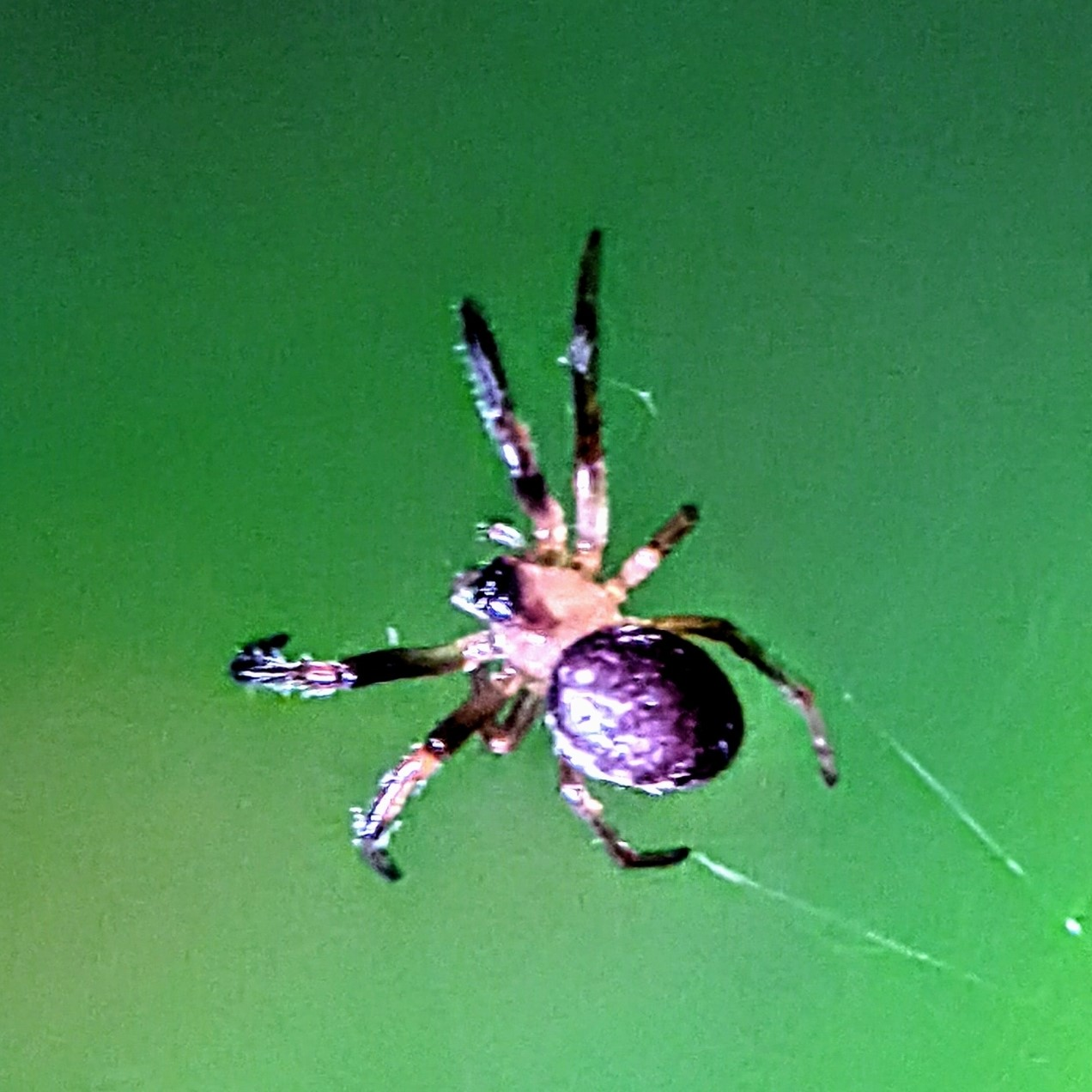
- Guizygiella nadleri

Scientific classification
- Kingdom: Animalia
- Phylum: Arthropoda
- Subphylum: Chelicerata
- Class: Arachnida
- Order: Araneae
- Infraorder: Araneomorphae
- Family: Araneidae
- Genus: Guizygiella; Zhu, Kim & Song, 1997

Type species
- G. salta (Yin & Gong, 1996)

Species
- 8, see text

= Guizygiella =

Genus of spiders

Guizygiella is a genus of Asian orb-weaver spiders that was first described by M. S. Zhu, J. P. Kim and D. X. Song in 1997. It was transferred from the family Tetragnathidae to Araneidae by Kallal & Hormiga in 2022.

== Species ==
As of November 2026 it contains eight species, found in Asia:

- Guizygiella guangxiensis (Zhu & Zhang, 1993) – China, Laos
- Guizygiella haoyangi Yao & Liu, 2025 – China
- Guizygiella huahai Mi, Wang & Li, 2024 – China
- Guizygiella indica (Tikader & Bal, 1980) – India
- Guizygiella melanocrania (Thorell, 1887) – India to China, Laos
- Guizygiella nadleri (Heimer, 1984) – China, Laos, Vietnam
- Guizygiella salta (Yin & Gong, 1996) (type) – China
- Guizygiella shivui (Patel & Reddy, 1990) – India

In synonymy:

- G. baojingensis (Yin, 2002, T from Zygiella) = Guizygiella salta (Yin & Gong, 1996)
- G. quadrata Zhu, Kim & Song, 1997 = Guizygiella salta (Yin & Gong, 1996)
