= Parameta =

Parameta jugularis

Scientific classification
- Kingdom: Animalia
- Phylum: Arthropoda
- Subphylum: Chelicerata
- Class: Arachnida
- Order: Araneae
- Infraorder: Araneomorphae
- Family: Tetragnathidae
- Genus: Parameta; Simon, 1895
- Species: P. jugularis

Binomial name
- Parameta jugularis Simon, 1895

Genus of spiders

Parameta is a genus of African long-jawed orb-weavers that was first described by Eugène Louis Simon in 1895. As of March 2021, it is monotypic, being represented by a single species, Parameta jugularis.
