= Parazilia =

Scientific classification
- Kingdom: Animalia
- Phylum: Arthropoda
- Subphylum: Chelicerata
- Class: Arachnida
- Order: Araneae
- Infraorder: Araneomorphae
- Family: Tetragnathidae
- Genus: Parazilia; Lessert, 1938
- Species: P. strandi

Binomial name
- Parazilia strandi Lessert, 1938

Genus of spiders

Parazilia is a monotypic genus of Congolese long-jawed orb-weavers containing the single species, Parazilia strandi. It was first described by R. de Lessert in 1938 from a female specimen found in the Congo.
