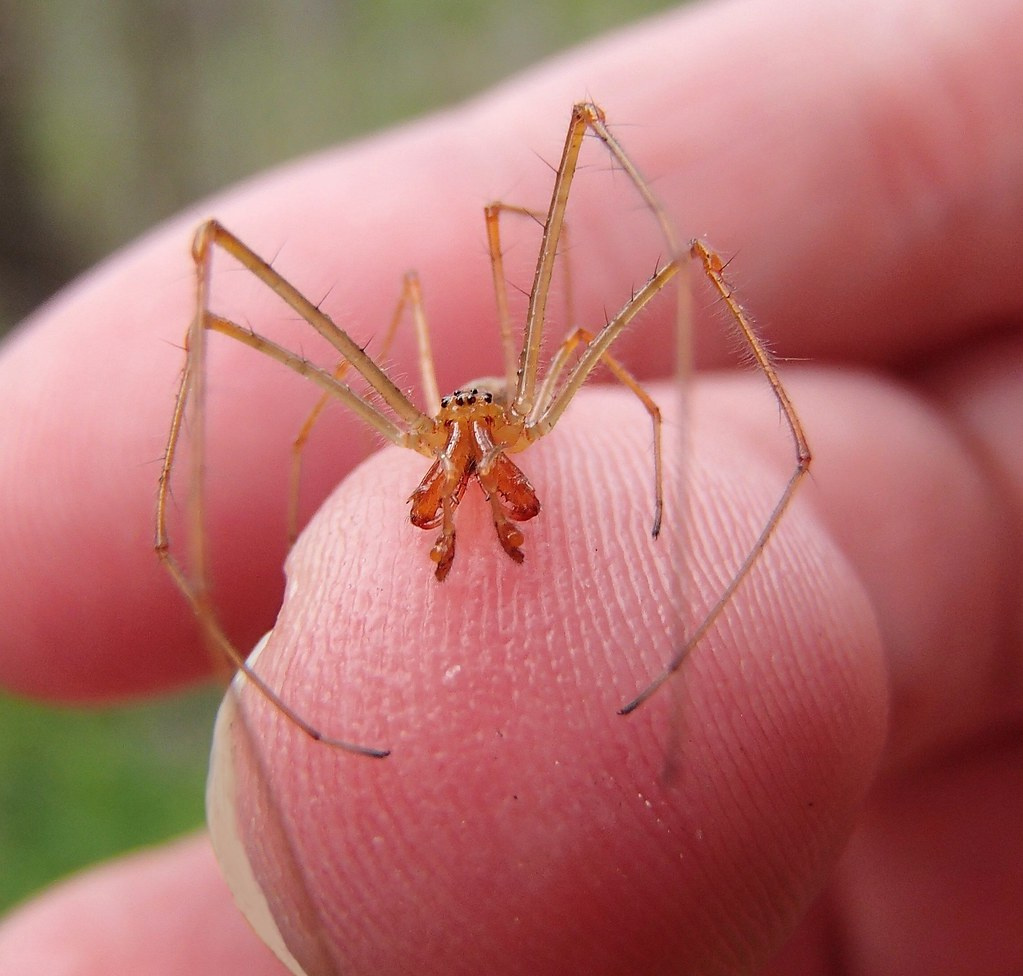

Scientific classification
- Kingdom: Animalia
- Phylum: Arthropoda
- Subphylum: Chelicerata
- Class: Arachnida
- Order: Araneae
- Infraorder: Araneomorphae
- Family: Tetragnathidae
- Genus: Tetragnatha
- Species: T. versicolor

Binomial name
- Tetragnatha versicolor Walckenaer, 1841

= Tetragnatha versicolor =

Species of spider

Tetragnatha versicolor is a species of long-jawed orb weaver in the spider family Tetragnathidae. It is found throughout North America, Canada, Central America, and Cuba, but are most common in the United States. T. versicolor is heavily concentrated in New England and the west coast in states like California and Washington. T. versicolor is considered a habitat generalist, and can thrive in many different environments. While they can be found in places like Grasslands, Wetlands, Forests, etc., they prefer dryer areas like normal trees and shrubs. Unlike other spiders in the genus Tetragnatha, T. versicolor will rarely reside near aquatic environments. T. versicolor will typically be colored dark yellow or pale orange and average around 5 mm for males and 6.5 mm for females in length, which is very small for a spider. They are much longer than they are wide, making them very distinct. In addition, T. versicolor can be distinguished from other spiders in Tetragnatha by the distinct separation of the anterior/posterior eyes and the appearance of their reproductive organs. As an orb weaver spider, T. versicolor creates a web to hunt for prey. It will wait at night for prey to stumble into its web and use vibrational signals throughout the web to sense trapped prey. In terms of mating behavior, T. versicolor lacks a distinct courting ritual and will mate with any others in the proximity. Mating behavior is heavily affected by female mating history. In terms of interactions with humans, the bite of T. versicolor is venomous, but not known to cause significant harm.

== Description ==
T. versicolor is generally a very small spider with males being slightly smaller than females. Males will average around 5 mm in length and 1.3 mm in width while females will average around 6.5 mm in length and 1.5 mm in width. The carapace of male T. versicolor will typically be colored dark yellow or pale orange with markings radiating dorsally. The male's lateral eyes are closer together than their median eyes. The distance between median and lateral eyes is rarely the same. Like the carapace, the legs are colored dark yellow or pale orange with a silver abdomen dorsally along the sides. The male's conductor has a thick rounded tip and a small point near the base of the structure. Females follow the same coloration patterns and eye spacing but have different reproductive structures. Their epigynum is short, broad, and concave and found on the posterior. The spermatheca contains an anterior and posterior end It appears large and bulbous.

=== Differentiating from other species ===
T. versicolor can be differentiated from other species in the genus by the distinct separation of the anterior/posterior eyes and the appearance of the reproductive organs. In addition, T. viridis looks very similar and can be distinguished from T. versicolor by the above mentioned criteria as well as the long macrosetae on the leg Tibiae.

== Habitat and distribution ==
T. versicolor can be found throughout most regions of North America. In the United States, this spider is heavily concentrated in the northeast and the west coast, from California to Washington. There have been sightings in Alaska as well. T. versicolor has been documented throughout Canada and very scarcely in Mexico, Central America, and even Cuba.

T. versicolor is a habitat generalist, indicating it is a species that mainly responds to spatial cues and dispersal processes instead of environmental processes and cues from other individuals. Unlike its relatives T. viridis, T. straminea, and T. elongata, it can live in areas ranging widely in elevation and vegetation type. While they can be found in places like wetlands, spruce forests, red oak forests, grasslands, etc., T. versicolor are typically found further from water than other Tetragnatha. Trees and shrubs are the natural home for these spiders. If present in Marshy areas, T. versicolor will usually be near herbaceous vegetation.

== Diet ==
Spiders of the Tetragnathidae family feed mainly on small flying Insects that are caught in their wheel-shaped web. In addition to insects, they will also prey upon Arthropods that happen to get caught in their web. Known predators of the T. versicolor include Birds, Lizards, Shrews, Salamanders, and Jumping spiders. T. versicolor are nocturnal, and are active only at night so they can avoid predators. During the day, they will line their bodies on twigs so they can camouflage themselves. Usually, T. versicolor will use thin branches so that heavier predators have a harder time reaching them.

Interestingly, venom composition of T. versicolor is related to the spider's diet. Female T. versicolor living in different regions consume different insects and this varied consumption of prey leads to differential expression of venom-producing genes. There is also differential expression between the two sexes, with males more likely to overexpress this venom-related gene than females – an example of sexual dimorphism in these spiders.

== Webs ==
=== Web type ===
As an orb weaver spider, T. versicolor weaves orb webs. Orb webs are made up of three components: radial threads, frame threads, and the catching spiral. The radial threads converge to the hub, which is the central spot of the web. The frame threads act as insertion sites for the radial threads. Both the radial threads and frame threads act as a scaffolding for the entire web and are structural components. Neither the radial threads nor frame threads are adhesive. In contrast, the catching spiral is very sticky and elastic, as it is coated with gluey droplets. Stickiness of the catching spiral varies based on species depending on the volume of sticky droplets on the web. The number of radii also varies depending on species. Spiders of Tetragnatha will have fewer radii (about 18) than Mangora which have 50–60. Frame and radial threads provide strong and stable construction. This allows for good signal transmission through vibrations. The sticky sections of the web trap prey and absorb and impact/struggling vibrations from prey, thus preventing any damage from being done to the web. Even the radial and frame threads help absorb any shock when prey fly into the web. The hub section for T. versicolor is actually missing, so the whole web appears as if there is a hole in the center.

=== Function ===
The spider web of T. versicolor, like any other orb weaver spider, is used to catch prey. It can be seen as an extension of the spider's senses. The orb web is efficiently made with a minimum amount of silk (0.1–0.5 mg of silk) in a short amount of time (30–60 minutes). The structure described above allows vibrations to be transmitted towards the center where the spider will usually sit, and provides direct access routes to anywhere on the web. In addition, the radii of the web take part in courtship by carrying chemical signals. The sticky section of the orb weaver's web is very elastic, and allows for trapped insects to struggle a great amount without escaping. These webs have an advantage due to their low visibility. Due to how thin the webs are, under natural conditions like low light or windy weather, they are practically invisible and can catch prey by surprise.

=== Construction ===
Construction of the orb web consists of three phases: establishment of the frame threads and radial threads, creation of the auxiliary spiral, and creation of the catching spiral. Interestingly, the creation of the web is done entirely without visual cues. T. versicolor will rely entirely on touch to create its web.

== Reproduction and life cycle ==
Egg sacs of T. versicolor are laid in May, June, and July. Mating can occur many times throughout a single lifespan. The egg sacs are each around 5–6 mm in diameter and are of greenish/whitish color. Each egg sac may contain as many as 103 eggs, each around 0.66 mm in diameter. Mature spiders can be found from April to September. It is unclear how long T. versicolor can live, but it is speculated that they can live at least a year. Once spiderlings hatch, they will molt several times before reaching maturity.

== Mating ==
=== Courtship and copulation ===
For T. versicolor, courtship is very subtle or non-existent. Most spiders will readily mate with each other once placed within close proximity. Typically, males will approach the female and her web. The female will be oriented towards the male's point of contact towards the web. Sensing the male's presence through vibrations, the female can either chase the male away or proceed with mating. If the male isn't chased away, the male will continue to advance towards the female and mating will occur. The two will approach each other rapidly with their chelicerae held apart. Then, grappling with their cheliceral fangs will occur. Soon after, a ventral-to-ventral mating position will be taken. The male inserts his palp by using his third pair of legs to pull the female's abdomen closer. While the male inserts his left and right palps into the female's reproductive tracts, the hematodochae will rapidly inflate and deflate. Usually the male palps will be inserted multiple times. Sperm release then occurs.

=== Effect of female mating history on mating ===
In addition to the fact that most T. versicolor will mate with little to no signs of courtship, the likelihood that two spiders will mate is not influenced by female mating history. However, male behavior towards female spiders was significantly different depending on if the female was a virgin or not. Males turned out to spend more time in copula with virgin females. Time spent in copula with virgin females was nearly double time spent with non-virgin females. Total copulation time is not affected by other variables like male/female body size or age. In addition, length of each palp insertion and number of palp insertions was affected by female mating history. Virgins experienced fewer long palp insertions and fewer insertions overall. In contrast, sperm release is not affected by female mating history.

== Behavior ==
=== Hunting ===
T. versicolor is very sedentary in their hunting strategy. As an orb weaver spider, T. versicolor will stay in one place most of the time to catch their prey. They often sit in the center of their webs or wait on nearby twigs or branches for prey to get caught up in their web. A mature male T. versicolor a may also wander to catch prey, whereas a female almost always remains sedentary. The sexual dimorphic expression of the venom-producing genes explains this behavior – males are more likely to overexpress the venom gene than females, which would be useful given that males are more susceptible to predation and attacks if they wander to hunt for prey.

=== Communication ===
T. versicolor has very poor vision, but is sensitive to vibrations and touch. During mating, T. versicolor will vibrate their webs to communicate.
