= Eustala davalosae =

Scientific classification
- Kingdom: Animalia
- Phylum: Arthropoda
- Subphylum: Chelicerata
- Class: Arachnida
- Order: Araneae
- Infraorder: Araneomorphae
- Family: Araneidae
- Genus: Eustala
- Species: E. davalosae

Binomial name
- Eustala davalosae Pett & Pai-Gibson, 2024

Species of spider

Eustala davalosae is a species of orb-weaver spider and can be found in Southern Paraguay.

== Description ==
Eustala davalosae is a relatively small spider. The female is around 5.5 mm (0.2 in). It is characterized by its wide epigynal plate.

== Etymology ==
The specific epithet "davalosae" is a tribute to Serafina Dávalos Alfonze, the first female lawyer in Paraguay and a prominent feminist.
