= Women in Paraguay =

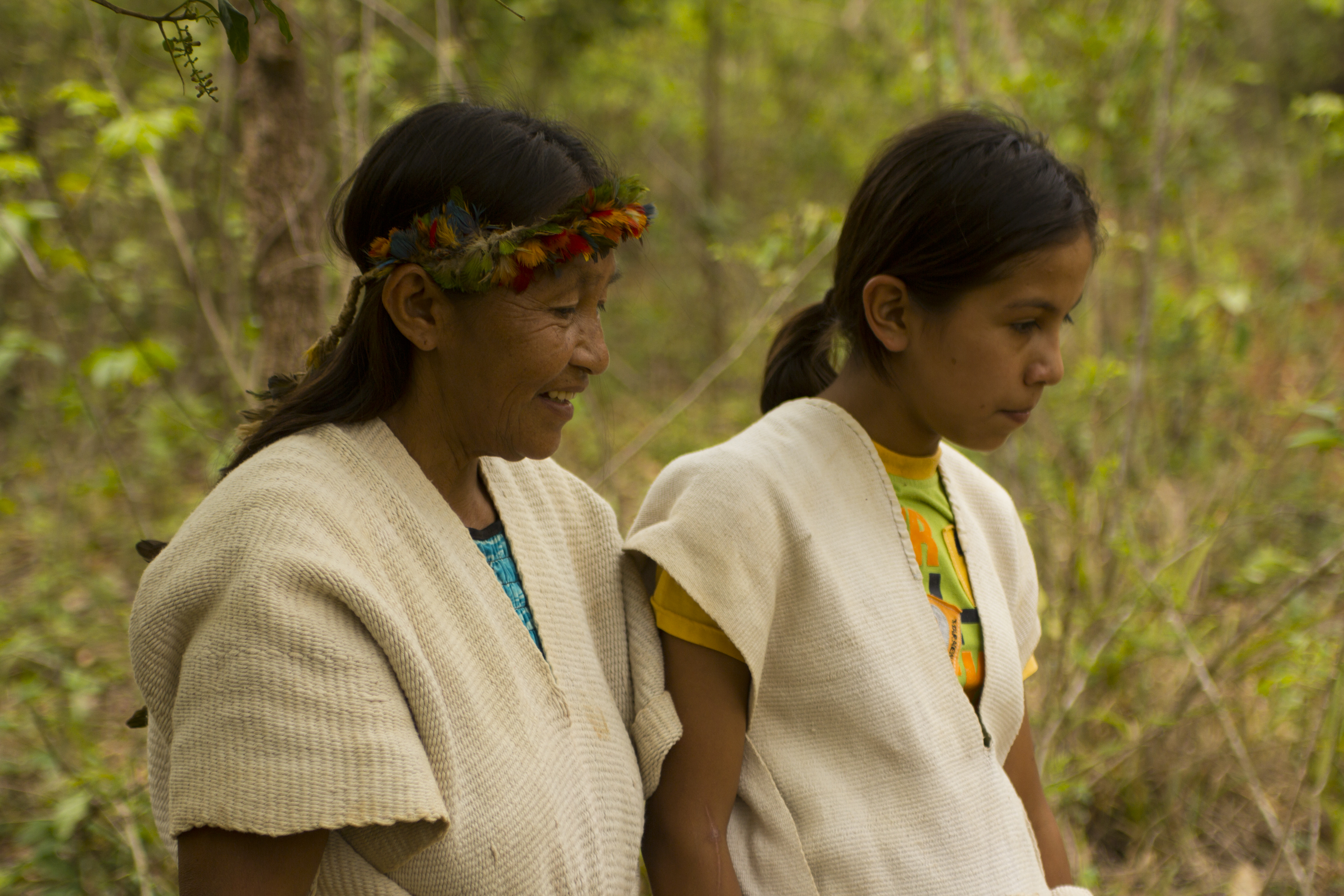
- Guarani indigenous women

General statistics
- Maternal mortality (per 100,000): 99 (2010)
- Women in parliament: 15% (2014)
- Women over 25 with secondary education: 35.0% (2010)
- Women in labour force: 57.9% (2011)

Gender Inequality Index
- Value: 0.445 (2021)
- Rank: 111th out of 191

Global Gender Gap Index
- Value: 0.707 (2022)
- Rank: 80th out of 146

Women in Paraguay face challenges to their rights. Faced by socioeconomic inequalities and gender pay gap, they experienced significant cultural changes since 1990 as a result of constitutional and legal expansions of women's rights and evolving cultural attitudes. The legal and government institutions currently existing in Paraguay were developed in part through the efforts of feminist organizations in the country that held significant awareness-raising campaigns during the 1990s to formalize the guarantees of women's rights. UN Women supports the Paraguayan State in the challenge to extend women's rights, to fight for gender equality, as well as women's empowerment. It also ensures that women's voices are heard and create more opportunities for women.

In 2015, UN developed its cooperation with state agencies that focused on the empowerment of women. The UN Women cooperation agenda was put into practice by means of the following strategies such as leadership and political participation for women in Paraguay.

== Education ==
Illiteracy rates for women in Paraguay are higher than those of men. This is especially prominent in the older generations of the Paraguay population. The gender gap in education has decreased in recent years. Among youth aged 15 to 24 years, the literacy rate is 99% for both males and females. Young people of both sexes begin dropping out of the education system at significant rates following primary levels and are unlikely to pursue education beyond the secondary level. As of 2010, of the population 15 and over, 92.9% of women and 94.8% of men were literate.

== Employment ==
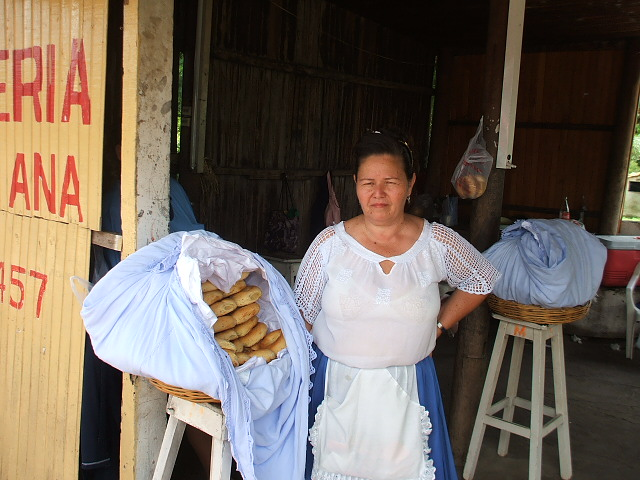
A woman shopkeeper in Paraguay.

Women's salaries in relation to men's are the second-lowest in Latin America. This is despite the fact that women make up 74% of Paraguay's labour force.

Sexual harassment and discrimination against women in the workplace are common issues in Paraguay. The Labor Code prohibits, but does not criminalize, discrimination or harassment on the basis of sex. Complaints are commonly settled privately. The Secretariat of Women's Affairs occasionally operates programs supporting women's access to employment, social security, housing, land ownership and business opportunities.

== Marriage ==
Early marriage is common in Paraguay. A 2004 United Nations report estimated that 17 percent of girls between 15 and 19 years of age were married, divorced or widowed. The legal age for marriage in Paraguay is 16.

== Divorce ==
Divorce was legalized in Paraguay in 1991. Paraguay was one of the last countries to legalize divorce, both in the world and in Latin America. Divorce was also legalized in 1991 in Colombia; across Latin America it was only Chile that had not legalized it by that time, subsequently doing so in 2004. The legalization of divorce in Paraguay had been strongly opposed by the Roman Catholic Church. Divorce rates in Paraguay remain well below worldwide averages, and are the lowest in Latin America.

== Maternity ==
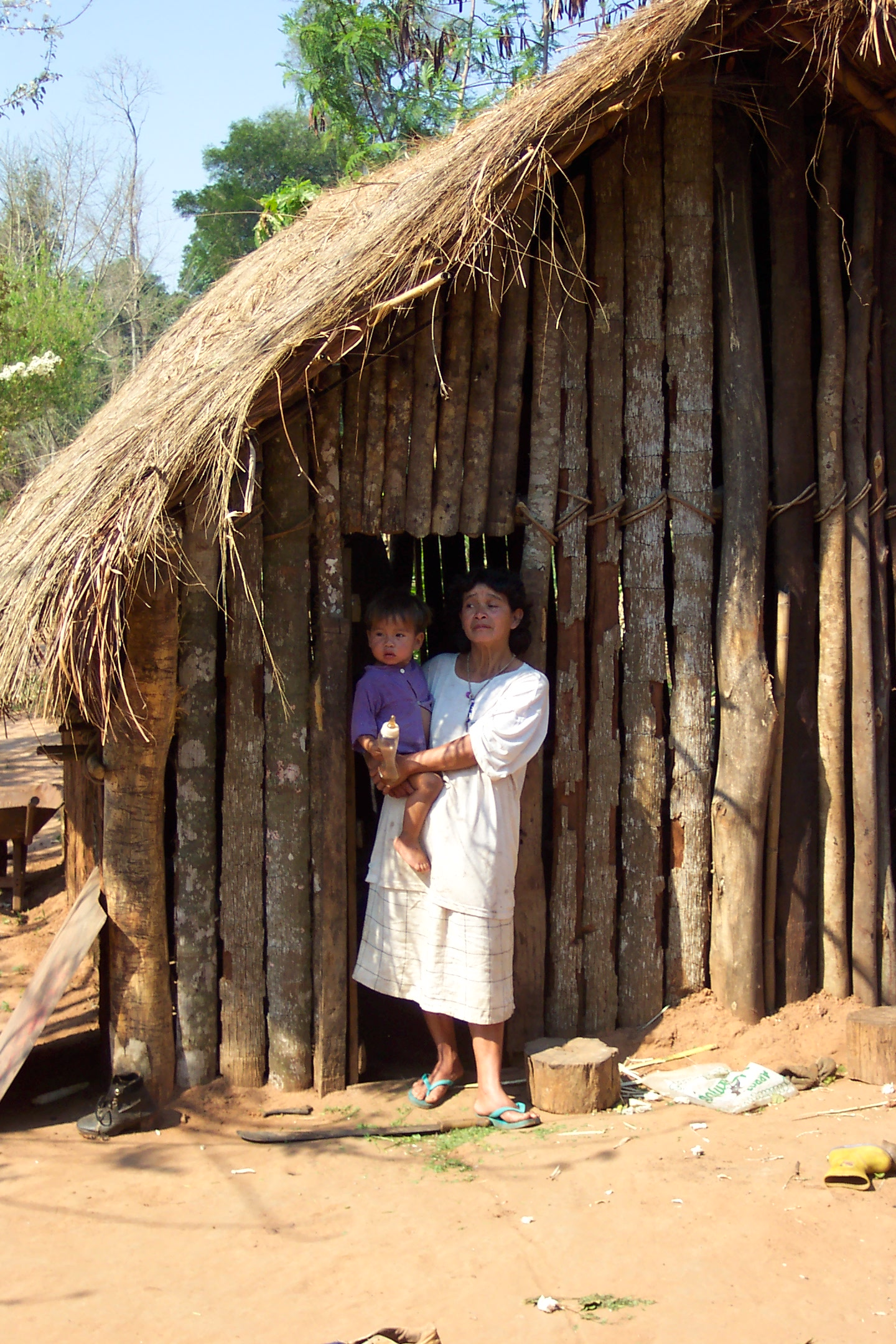
An indigenous woman and child. Fertility rates are higher in rural areas and among indigenous women.

Fertility rates in Paraguay were historically high relative to other countries in the Latin American region prior to the 1990s, and have significantly declined since then with an estimated rate of 2.9 in 2004. Research has found that births before marriage are common in Paraguay, although this phenomenon is decreasing. One study established that birth rates before a first marriage were 23, 24, and 21 percent, based on 2004, 1998, and 1995–96 data. The maternal mortality rate in Paraguay is 99 deaths/100,000 live births (as of 2010).

== Sexuality and birth control ==
Declining cultural influence of the Roman Catholic Church in Paraguay has initiated a change in attitudes towards women's sexuality and the use of birth control. The use of modern contraceptive methods including birth control pills, condoms, and IUDs, increased from a rate of 43% in 1996 to more than 60% by 2004. Adultery was decriminalized in 1990. The HIV/AIDS rate is 0.3% for adults (aged 15–49), as of 2012 estimates.

Abortion remains illegal in Paraguay, with exceptional cases where it can be demonstrated that the life of the mother is in danger.

== Financial matters ==
Agriculture is a significant component of Paraguay's economy and an important source of income, with approximately 45% of Paraguay's workforce being employed in agriculture. Access to land ownership has been problematic for women in Paraguay. However, there are no legal restrictions on female land ownership, although women are half as likely as men to be approved for loans to buy land. The 2002 Agrarian Act includes provisions intended to strengthen women's rights in this regard.

== Politics ==
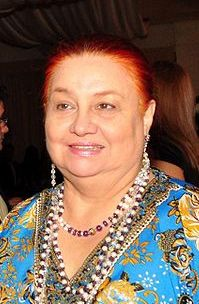
Gloria Rubìn, Paraguay's Minister of the Women's Secretariat, supports reforms that improve women's rights.

Women in Paraguay have no legal restrictions on holding political office. Women have served in the government as members of the Congress (as National Deputies and as Senators), as governors, as heads of ministries, and there has been one female Supreme Court judge. They are underrepresented in comparison to male members of the government, however, and even relative to the rates of female representation in the governments of other countries of Latin America. Indeed, Paraguay has one of the lowest percentage of women in parliament in Latin America, significantly lower than neighboring Argentina and Bolivia, although higher than Brazil. In 1993 the Paraguayan state created a Secretariat for Women's Affairs within the Office of the President. This secretariat was raised to the status of a Ministry of Women by Act No. 4675, in 2012.

== Violence against women ==
=== Domestic violence ===
Domestic abuse is a common issue in Paraguay. The legal response of Paraguay to domestic violence has been minimal. Paraguay enacted Law No. 1,600 Against Domestic Violence (Ley No 1.600 contra la Violencia Doméstica) in 2000. While the Criminal Code provides for a crime of domestic violence, this crime has a narrow definition as physical violence that is carried out habitually, and is punishable only by a fine. As of 2014, there have been increasing calls, from both inside and outside of the country, for the enactment of a comprehensive law against violence against women.

=== Human trafficking ===
Human trafficking for the purposes of forcing young women into prostitution is a pre-existing issue. In recent years, human trafficking networks organized by Taiwanese and Chinese nationals have been blocked by Paraguayan law enforcement, with Paraguayan women being trafficked to Brazil, Argentina, or Spain to work in brothels. There are no precise estimates of the number of women who are victims of human trafficking, but anecdotal estimates suggest that several hundred Paraguayan women are smuggled out of the country annually. Underage girls are also trafficked within Paraguay and to neighbouring countries as domestic servants.

== Women's rights history in Paraguay ==
The movement to expand women's rights in Paraguay grew significantly in the 1920s, in large part through the work of María Felicidad González, who represented her country at a feminist conference in Baltimore, in 1922. One year earlier, on April 26, 1921, she opened the Centro Femenino del Paraguay (CFP) (Women's Centre of Paraguay). Influenced by women's rights movements in North America and Europe, Paraguayan women also began to mobilize and claim their rights. During this period, feminism was associated with the Revolutionary Febrerista Party.

=== Paraguayan Women's Union ===
In 1936, during the Revolution of February 17, 1936, the Unión Femenina del Paraguay (UFP) (Paraguayan Women's Union) was created. It was founded on April 26, 15 years after the founding of the Women's Centre of Paraguay, at a meeting that took place at the Colegio Nacional de la Capital, in Asunción. The first president of the Union was Maria F. de Casati.

The Union, in addition to its feminist cause, was openly socialist and part of the wider changes resulting from the Revolution of February 17, 1936. In fact, María F. de Casati stated:

Our feminist movement was born on February 17, with the Revolution that was a clarion call to the popular soul, which opened to everyone the hope for social improvement".

Among the participants in the Union were Elena Freis de Barthe, Lorenza C. de Gaona, and Luisa vda. de Felip. The Union published a periodical called Por la Mujer (For Women), which was the first feminist periodical in Paraguay. Among other causes, it promoted women's suffrage and equality of the sexes.

The Union held meetings in the capitol and throughout Paraguay to raise awareness among women about their rights. Ties were strengthened with other feminist groups in the Americas, including: Asociación Argentina Pro-Sufragio Femenino, the Confederación Femenina de la Paz Americana, Liga Femenina Pro-Union Americana, the Asociación Argentina Pro Paz, and the Asociación Cristiana Femenina.

In 1937, with the fall of the government that came into power following the Revolution of February 17, 1936, the Union was driven to separate.

=== Women's Democratic Union ===
After passing several years between 1940 and 1945 without a women's rights organization, the Unión Democrática de Mujeres (UDM) (Women's Democratic Union) was founded on December 19, 1946. It grew out of the Agrupación de Mujeres Febrerista Residentes en Montevideo (AMFRM) (Association of Febrerista Women Living in Montevideo), which was connected to the Concentración Revolucionaria Febrerista, a Febrerista exile group based out of Montevideo, Uruguay. The founders of this group included Carmen Soler, Esther Ballestrino, Lilia Freis, and several others. This group was pressured to disband following the Paraguayan Civil War in 1947.

=== Febrerista Women's Emancipation Movement ===
The Movimiento Femenino Febrerista de Emancipación (MFFE) (Febrerista Women's Emancipation Movement) was founded in 1949, and it was the successor organization to the Agrupación de Mujeres Febreristas Residentes en Montevideo. It published a periodical, Correspondencia. The MFFE remained associated with the Concentración Revolucionaria Febrerista group. In 1951, the Febrerista Revolutionary Party was founded, and the MFFE was integrated with it.

Women's suffrage was gained in Paraguay in 1961, primarily because the strongarm president, Alfredo Stroessner, lacking the approval of his male constituents, sought to bolster his support through women voters.

=== Current feminist organizations ===
In recent years, almost all major political parties in Paraguay have included groups focussed on women's rights issues. Many members of these groups were part of the Mujeres por la Alianza (Women for the Alliance) movement that supported the candidacy of Fernando Lugo, on April 20, 2008.

== See also ==
- Indigenous women in the conquest of Paraguay

== Bibliography ==
- Juan Speratti: Feminismo, Editorial Litocolor, Asunción, 1989
