= Serafina Dávalos =

Paraguayan lawyer and feminist

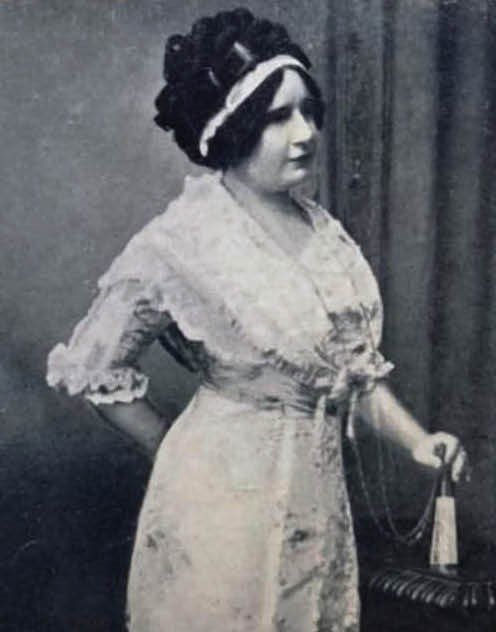
- Born: Serafina Dávalos Alfonso; 9 September 1883; Ajos (now Coronel Oviedo), Paraguay
- Died: 27 September 1957 (aged 74); Paraguay
- Occupation: Lawyer

Serafina Dávalos Alfonso (9 September 1883 – 27 September 1957) was the first female lawyer in Paraguay, and the country's first prominent feminist.

== Early life ==
She was born in the Paraguayan city of Ajos (now Coronel Oviedo). Her parents were Gaspar Dávalos and Teresa Alfonso.

== Career ==
She graduated from law school at the Universidad Nacional de Asunción (becoming its first female graduate) in 1907 with a thesis, "Humanism and Feminism", that questioned the submission of women, argued for the education of women and the improvement of women's status in marriage, and was controversial. She also founded with Virginia Corvalán and others the Feminist Movement for Asunción (in 1919), the Paraguayan Feminist Center (1921), the Feminine Union of Paraguay, and the Paraguayan League for the Rights of Women. In 1904 she and twenty other women founded the Committee of Women for Peace.

She earned her teaching diploma from the Normal School for Female Teachers in 1898, earned her bachelor's degree from the Colegio National in 1902, and worked as a professor at the National College of the Capital starting in 1904; she founded (possibly with others) the Mercantile School for Girls (a business school) in 1905. In the first International Feminist Congress in 1910 in Argentina, Dávalos was the official delegate of Paraguay, and was appointed as a member of the executive committee of the Pan-American Women's Federation. She was later selected as Honorary President of the National Council of Women of Paraguay.

In 1936 she was the Consul to the Paraguay Feminine Union (UFP). In 1952, she participated in the Paraguayan League for the Rights of Women.

== Personal life ==
She never married and lived with "[h]er constant companion, Honoria Ballirán", as mentioned in 1959 by Dr. Ignacio Amado Berino, Secretary General of the National University of Asunción, in his lecture on "Serafina Dávalos, the precursor of feminism in Paraguay," published in the newspaper "El Feminista" and reproduced as an annex to the thesis of "Serafina Dávalos: Humanismo,” conducted by the Centre for Documentation and Studies and RP Ediciones.

== Legacy ==
In 1998, long after her death, she became the first woman to appear on a Paraguayan postage stamp when the General Post Office of Paraguay issued stamps that read "The First Female Lawyer and Feminist of Paraguay (1883–1957)." There is also a street named in her honor in the administrative center of Coronel Oviedo, the city where she was born.

== See also ==
- First woman lawyers around the world
