= Liga Paraguaya de los Derechos de la Mujer =

Paraguayan women's rights organization

Liga Paraguaya de los Derechos de la Mujer (League for Women's Rights) was a women's organization in Paraguay, founded in 1951. It played an important role in the campaign for women's suffrage, which was introduced in 1961, the last for any South American nation.

== History ==
The organized women's movement in Paraguay had not been able to form a permanent organization. The Liga Paraguaya was preceded by Unión Femenina del Paraguay (UFP) (1936–1937) and the Unión Democrática de Mujeres (UDM) (1946–1947), both of whom became temporary; the UFP being dissolved because of its affiliation with the government which fell in 1937, and the UDM because of the Paraguayan Civil War (1947). In contrast to their predecessors, the Liga Paraguaya de los Derechos de la Mujer became the first long-term women's organization.

In 1948, Paraguay signed the convention of the Organization of American States in Bogotá, which acknowledged that women had the same political rights as men. By the late 1940s, both the Colorado party and the Liberal party officially promised legal equality for women, but little legal reform was performed in practice.

The Liga Paraguaya de los Derechos de la Mujer was founded by the leading suffragist lawyer Mercedes Sandoval de Hempel on 7 June 1951. Concepción Rojas Benítez, Representative of Paraguay in the Inter-American Commission of Women, was elected its president.

The stated purpose of the Liga was to campaign for political and legal equality for women and men, including the right to women's suffrage.

A 1954 law introduced a legal framework providing equal rights for women, but only selectively by civil status: equal rights were granted to unmarried women and widows but not married women.

During the military dictatorship of Alfredo Stroessner (1954–1989), the activity of the Liga Paraguaya became difficult, like the work of all organizations not affiliated with the ruling Colorado party.

Women's suffrage was finally introduced in Paraguay on 5 July 1961 when Stroessner, lacking the approval of his male constituents, sought to expand his voter base through women voters.
