= Mangora sandovalae =

Scientific classification
- Domain: Eukaryota
- Kingdom: Animalia
- Phylum: Arthropoda
- Subphylum: Chelicerata
- Class: Arachnida
- Order: Araneae
- Infraorder: Araneomorphae
- Family: Araneidae
- Genus: Mangora
- Species: M. sandovalae

Binomial name
- Mangora sandovalae Pett & Pai-Gibson, 2024

Species of spider

Mangora sandovalae is a species of orb-weaver spider that can be found in Southern Paraguay.

== Description ==
Mangora sandovalae is most similar to the species M. caballero. The length of the holotype (a female) is 5.84 mm (0.23 in).

== Etymology ==
The specific epithet "sandovalae" is a tribute to Mercedes Sandoval de Hempel, a lawyer and prominent feminist from Paraguay.
