= Mangora =

Mangora can refer to:

- Mingora in Swat, Pakistan
- Mangora (spider), a genus of spiders
