= Virginia Corvalán =

Paraguayan lawyer and feminist

Virginia Carlota Corvalán (1900-1957), was a Paraguayan lawyer and feminist.

She was born on 9 February 1900 in Asunción, Paraguay, to Miguel Corvalán and Ana Casco.

She studied at the National College, graduating in 1918, and was the only woman of the 40 graduates in that term. Between 1919 and 1921, she was actively campaigning for women's rights. She was a co-founder and participant in the Centro Feminista Paraguayo (Paraguayan Feminist Center), which was pushing for passage of the draft law on equal rights between men and women, introduced by deputy Telémaco Silvera. The Center was the first feminist organization in Paraguay and included members such as Serafina Dávalos, Carmen Garcete, Carmen Gatti, Felicidad González, Adela Ibáñez, Ermelinda Ortiz, Sabrina Sapena Pastor, Catalina Steward, and Elida Ugarriza, among many others.

Corvalán went on to study law and obtained a doctorate of law and social sciences in 1923, becoming the second woman in Paraguay to hold the distinction. Her thesis, entitled "Femininismo: La causa de la mujer en el Paraguay" (Feminism, the cause of women in Paraguay), was published in 1925, and argued from a feminist perspective women's equality in intelligence and virtue, establishing a foundation as to why they should have the right to vote. She argued that while men were heroes for their participation in war, the sacrifices of women for the country were unrecognized.

In 1926 she married Dr. Peter Larán. During the Chaco War, Larán was a Judge Advocate General in the Comanchaco and Corvalán served as his assistant. After the war ended in 1936, she became the Minister of the Women's Union of Paraguay.

Corvalán often linked feminism with socialism focusing on worker's issues. She spoke German, French and English in addition to her native tongue, which allowed her to serve as the legal representative for the Cinema Splendid of the House Pretán of Paris and the German Colony of Paraguay.
