= Eustala californiensis =

Scientific classification
- Kingdom: Animalia
- Phylum: Arthropoda
- Subphylum: Chelicerata
- Class: Arachnida
- Order: Araneae
- Infraorder: Araneomorphae
- Family: Araneidae
- Genus: Eustala
- Species: E. californiensis

Binomial name
- Eustala californiensis (Keyserling, 1885)

Species of spider

Eustala californiensis is a species of orb weaver in the spider family Araneidae. It is found in the United States and Mexico.
