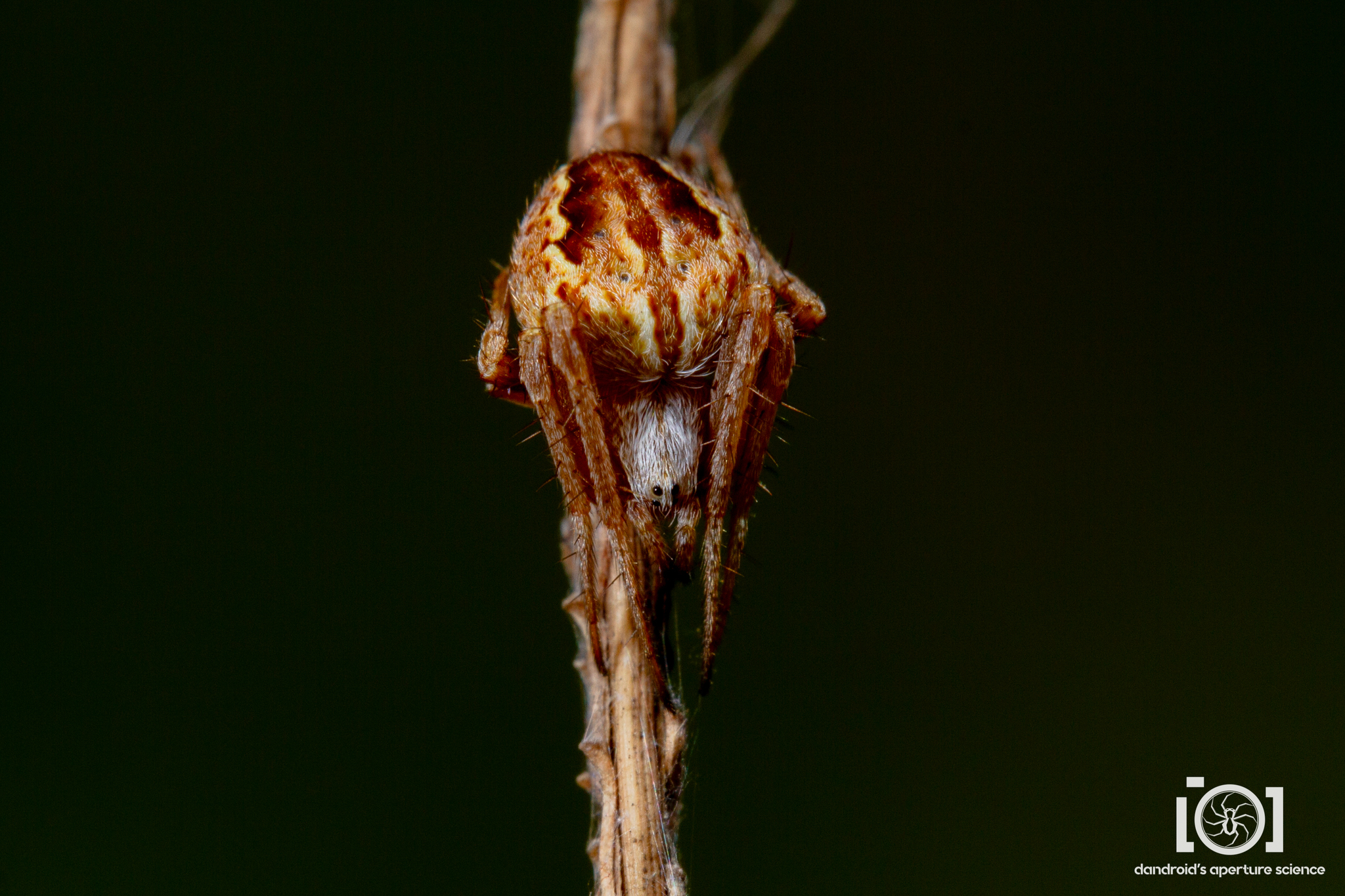
- female from Florida

Scientific classification
- Kingdom: Animalia
- Phylum: Arthropoda
- Subphylum: Chelicerata
- Class: Arachnida
- Order: Araneae
- Infraorder: Araneomorphae
- Family: Araneidae
- Genus: Eustala
- Species: E. emertoni

Binomial name
- Eustala emertoni (Banks, 1904)

= Eustala emertoni =

Species of spider

Eustala emertoni is a species of orb weaver in the spider family Araneidae. It is found in the United States and Mexico.
