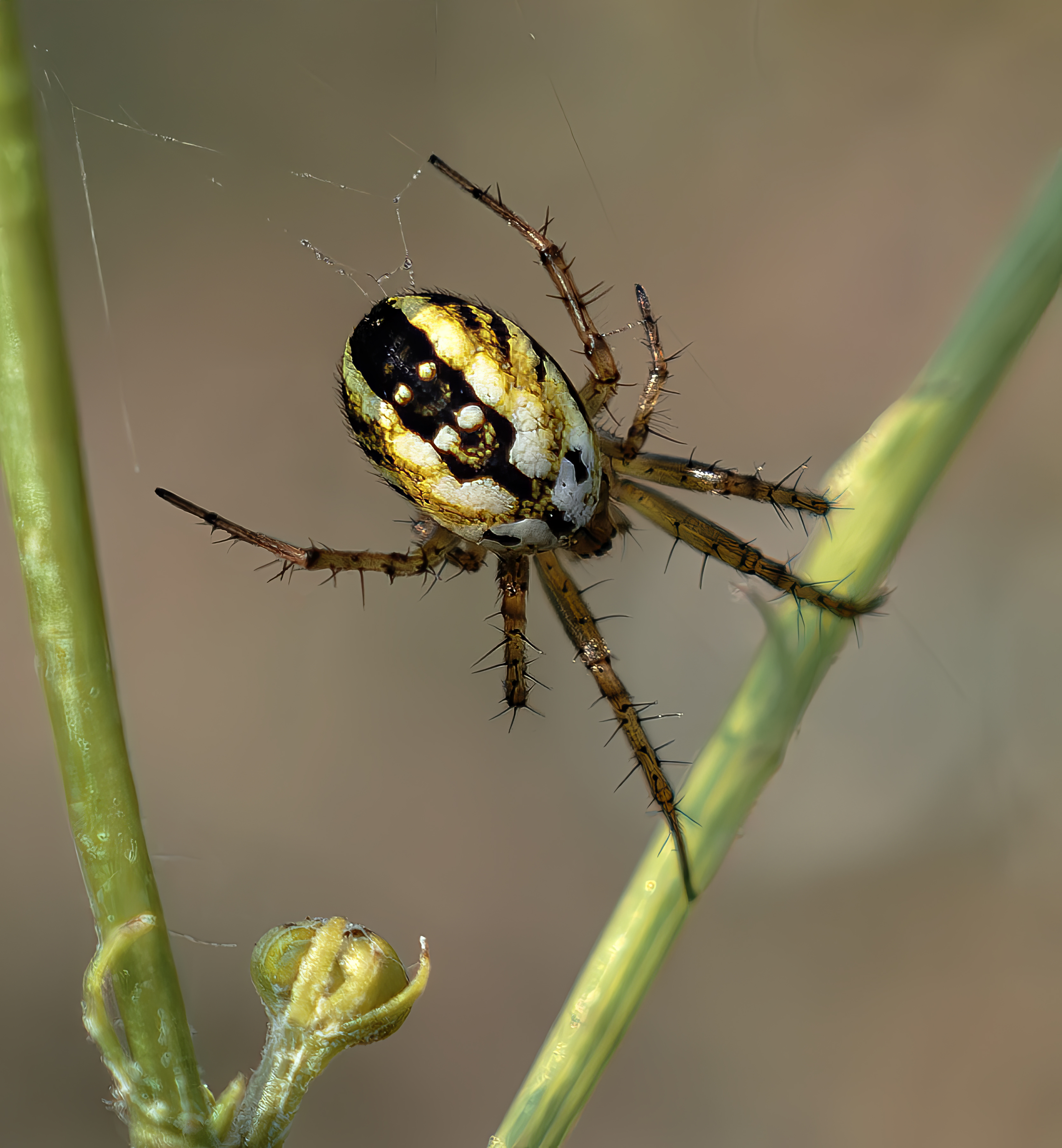
- Female dorsal view

Scientific classification
- Kingdom: Animalia
- Phylum: Arthropoda
- Subphylum: Chelicerata
- Class: Arachnida
- Order: Araneae
- Infraorder: Araneomorphae
- Family: Araneidae
- Genus: Mangora
- Species: M. acalypha

Binomial name
- Mangora acalypha (Walckenaer, 1802)

Synonyms
- Aranea acalypha Walckenaer, 1802; Epeira acalypha (Walckenaer, 1802); Epeira genistae Hahn, 1831; Zilla genistae (Hahn, 1831); Zilla decora C. L. Koch, 1837; Zilla acalypha (Walckenaer, 1802); Miranda acalypha (Walckenaer, 1802); Meta acalypha (Walckenaer, 1802)

= Mangora acalypha =

Species of spider

Mangora acalypha, also known by its common name cricket-bat orbweaver, is a species of spider in the family Araneidae, found throughout the Palearctic realm. This species was originally described by Charles Athanase Walckenaer in 1802 as Aranea acalypha.

== Habitat ==
Mangora acalypha is common in meadows, forests and gardens.
