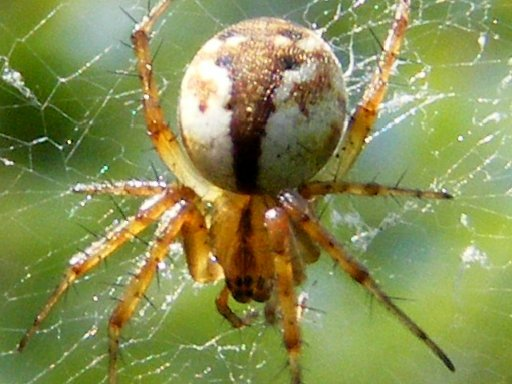

Scientific classification
- Domain: Eukaryota
- Kingdom: Animalia
- Phylum: Arthropoda
- Subphylum: Chelicerata
- Class: Arachnida
- Order: Araneae
- Infraorder: Araneomorphae
- Family: Araneidae
- Genus: Mangora
- Species: M. placida

Binomial name
- Mangora placida (Hentz, 1847)

= Mangora placida =

Species of spider

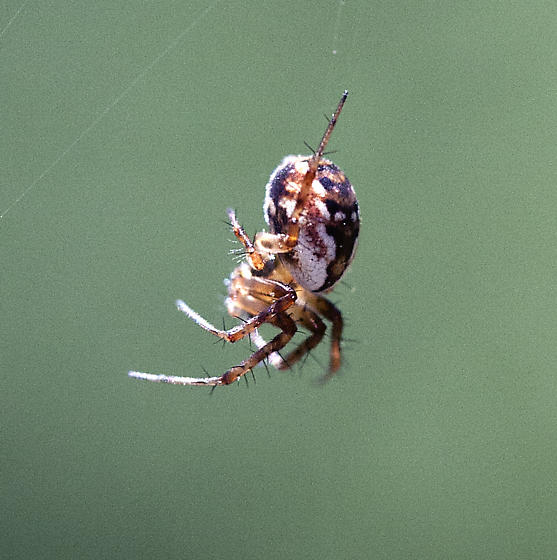
Lateral view

Mangora placida is a species of spider in the family Araneidae, found in North America.
