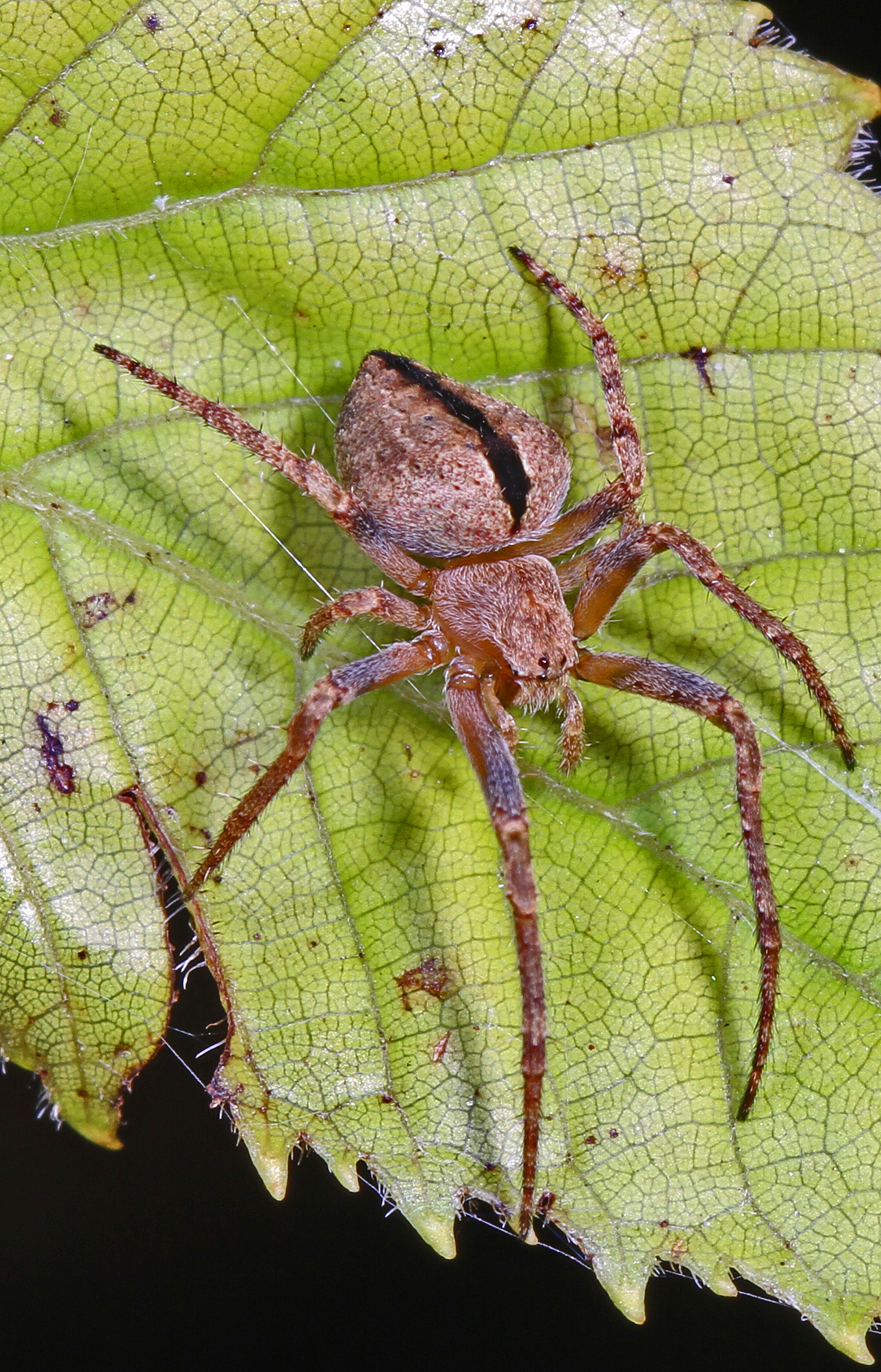

Scientific classification
- Kingdom: Animalia
- Phylum: Arthropoda
- Subphylum: Chelicerata
- Class: Arachnida
- Order: Araneae
- Infraorder: Araneomorphae
- Family: Araneidae
- Genus: Eustala
- Species: E. cepina

Binomial name
- Eustala cepina (Walckenaer, 1841)

= Eustala cepina =

Species of spider

Eustala cepina is a species of orb weaver in the family of spiders known as Araneidae. It is found in North America.
