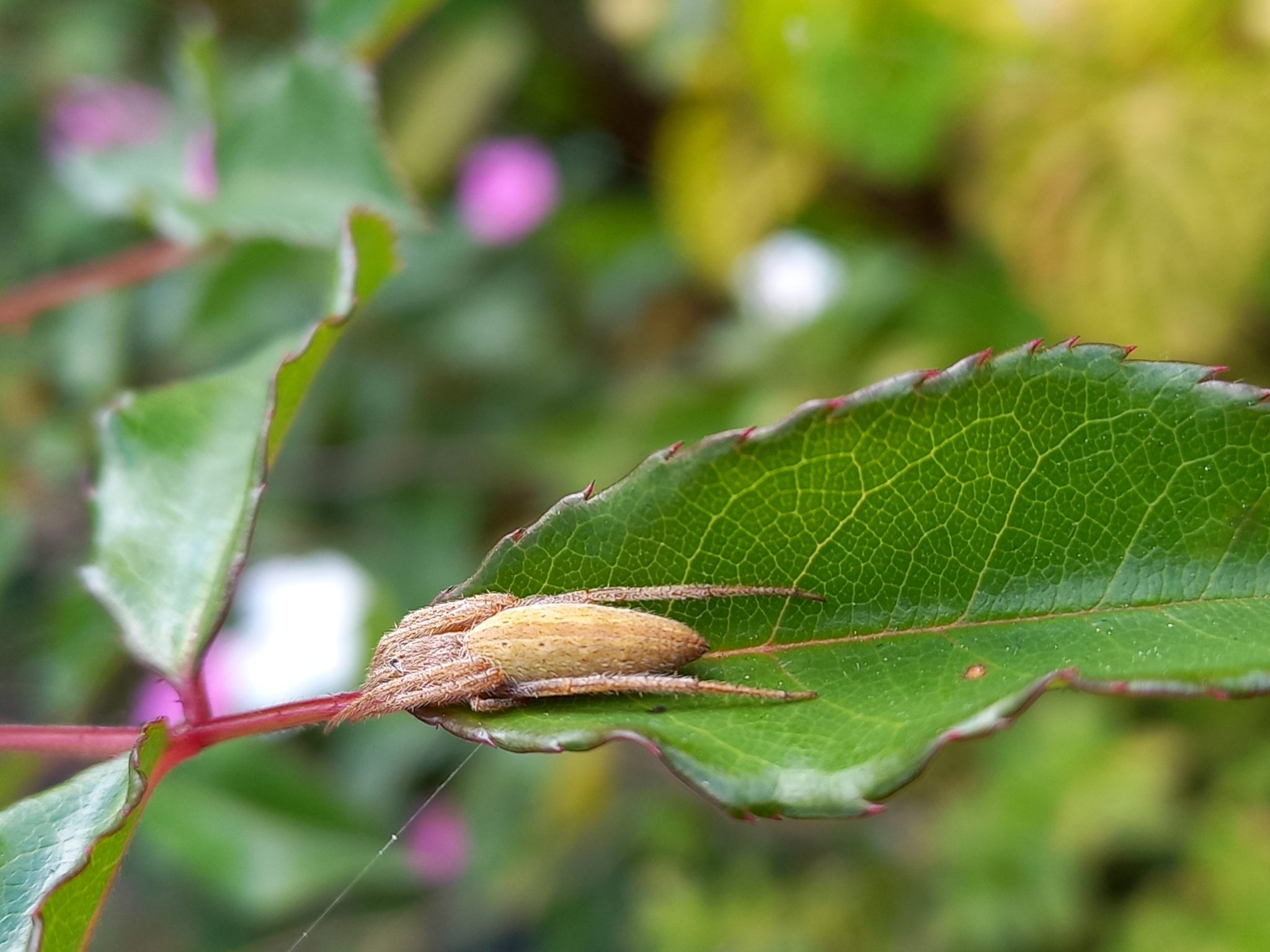
- female from Colombia

Scientific classification
- Kingdom: Animalia
- Phylum: Arthropoda
- Subphylum: Chelicerata
- Class: Arachnida
- Order: Araneae
- Infraorder: Araneomorphae
- Family: Araneidae
- Genus: Eustala
- Species: E. fuscovittata

Binomial name
- Eustala fuscovittata (Keyserling, 1864)

Synonyms
- Epeira fusco-vittata Keyserling, 1864; Nephila hirta Taczanowski, 1873; Cyclosa thorelli McCook, 1894; Epeira caudata Banks, 1898; Eustala anastera vermiformis Franganillo, 1931; Eustala procurva Franganillo, 1936; Eustala richardsi Mello-Leitão, 1939; Nephilengys hirta (Taczanowski, 1873)

= Eustala fuscovittata =

Species of orb-weaver spider

Eustala fuscovittata is a species of orb-weaver spider in the family Araneidae. Originally described as Epeira fusco-vittata by Eugen von Keyserling in 1864, it has a wide distribution across the Americas.

== Distribution ==
E. fuscovittata has been recorded from the United States, Cuba, Mexico, Guatemala, Honduras, Costa Rica, Nicaragua, Panama, Colombia, and Guyana.

== Description ==
Like many related species, E. fuscovittata exhibits notable sexual dimorphism in size and appearance.

=== Female ===
Females are considerably larger than males, with a total length of approximately 11.2 mm. The cephalothorax is oval-shaped, much longer than broad, and reddish-brown in coloration with a narrow dark band running across the posterior portion that divides at the head region. The abdomen has an elongated oval shape and is yellowish-brown with numerous small brown ring-like spots and some larger markings. A broad, dark, wavy band runs along the entire length of the dorsal surface, enclosing a narrow black longitudinal stripe in the center.

The eye arrangement shows the four median eyes of equal size, with the anterior pair separated by more than twice their diameter, while the posterior median eyes are closer together. The lateral eyes are slightly smaller and positioned close to each other.

=== Male ===
Males are smaller with a total body length of approximately 6-8 mm. The posterior row of eyes is slightly recurved, with the median eyes almost touching and separated from the lateral eyes by four times their own diameter. The anterior row is strongly procurved, with the median eyes more distant from each other than from the lateral eyes.

The male cephalothorax is brown with a median dark line, while the sternum, labium, maxillae, pedipalps and legs are darker. The abdomen is brownish cinereous with a broad longitudinal stripe, and all leg spines are black with yellow broad rings.

== Taxonomy ==
This species has had a complex taxonomic history with numerous synonyms. Originally described by Keyserling in 1864 as Epeira fusco-vittata, it was later transferred to the genus Eustala by Frederick Octavius Pickard-Cambridge in 1904. Several species have been synonymized with E. fuscovittata over time, including Nephilengys hirta (Taczanowski, 1873), which was recognized as a synonym in 2007, and Eustala anastera vermiformis, E. procurva, and E. richardsi, which were synonymized in 2013.
