= María Felicidad González =

Paraguayan academic (1884–1980)

- Born: 1884; Paraguarí, Paraguay
- Died: 1980 (aged 95–96)
- Occupations: Professor, activist

María Felicidad González (1884 in Paraguarí, Paraguay – 1980) was a Paraguayan academic and feminist activist. She is considered a leading figure in the early history of Paraguayan feminism.

After completing her studies in 1908, González became the director of the Escuela Graduada de la Encarnación. The following year she became regent of the Escuela Normal del Paraguay, a post she held until 1914 when she was promoted to Vice-Director; she later became Director in 1921, a post she held until 1932.

González co-founded the Centro Femenino Paraguayo (Paraguayan Women's Center) in 1921, and she represented Paraguay at the 1922 Pan-American Conference of Women.

== See also ==
- Women in Paraguay
