= Mangora semiargentea =

Scientific classification
- Kingdom: Animalia
- Phylum: Arthropoda
- Subphylum: Chelicerata
- Class: Arachnida
- Order: Araneae
- Infraorder: Araneomorphae
- Family: Araneidae
- Genus: Mangora
- Species: M. semiargentea

Binomial name
- Mangora semiargentea Simon, 1895

Species of spider

Mangora semiargentea, is a species of spider of the genus Mangora. It is endemic to Sri Lanka.
