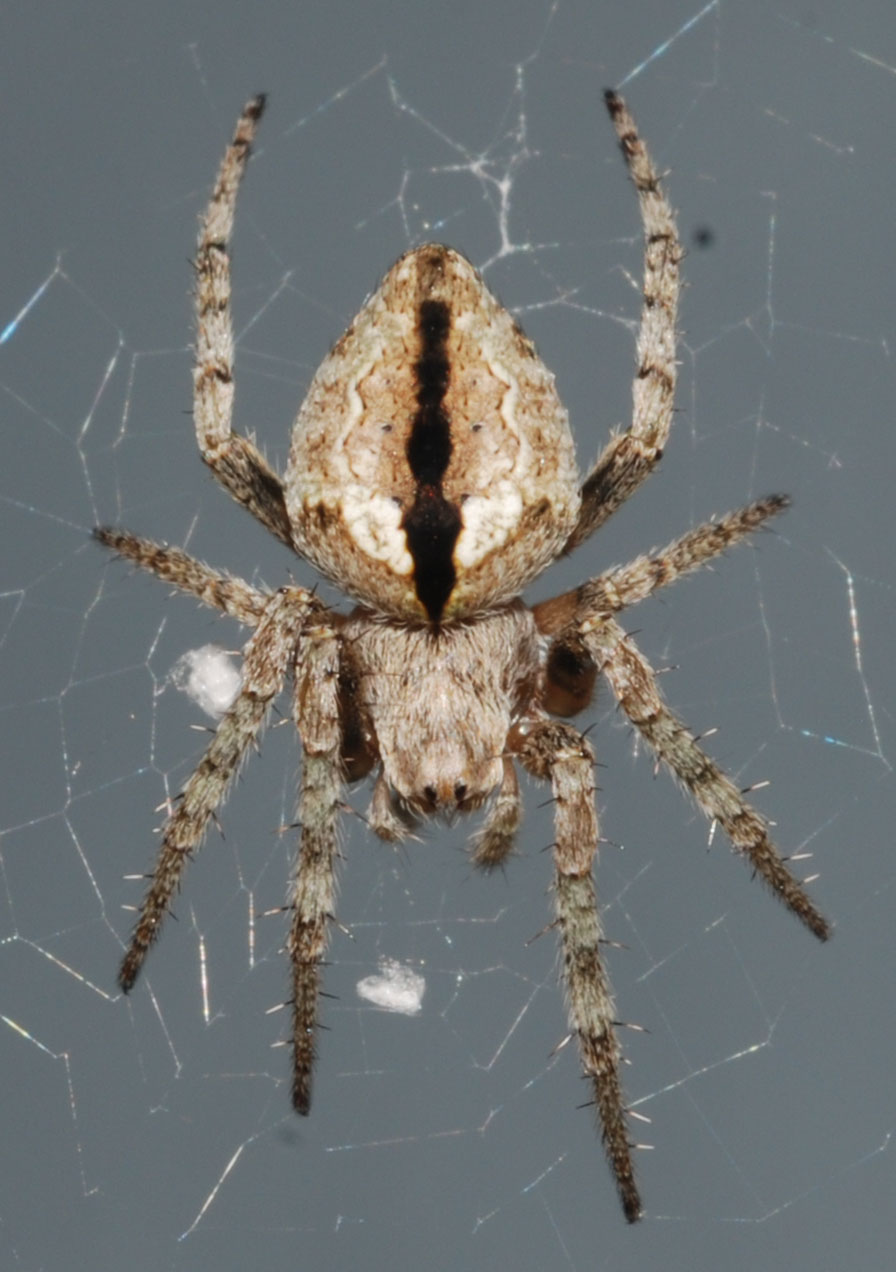
- Eustala anastera

Scientific classification
- Kingdom: Animalia
- Phylum: Arthropoda
- Subphylum: Chelicerata
- Class: Arachnida
- Order: Araneae
- Infraorder: Araneomorphae
- Family: Araneidae
- Genus: Eustala; Simon, 1895

Type species
- E. anastera (Walckenaer, 1841)

Species
- 87, see text

= Eustala =

Genus of spiders

Eustala is a genus of orb-weaver spiders first described by Eugène Simon in 1895.

== Species ==
As of November 2026 it contains eighty-seven species:

- E. albiventer (Keyserling, 1884) – Brazil
- E. anastera (Walckenaer, 1841) – North, Central America
- E. bacelarae Caporiacco, 1955 – Venezuela
- E. banksi Chickering, 1955 – Mexico, Costa Rica
- E. belissima Poeta, Marques & Buckup, 2010 – Brazil, Uruguay
- E. bifida F. O. Pickard-Cambridge, 1904 – USA to Panama
- E. bisetosa Bryant, 1945 – Hispaniola
- E. brevispina Gertsch & Davis, 1936 – USA, Mexico
- E. bucolica Chickering, 1955 – Panama
- E. californiensis (Keyserling, 1885) – USA, Mexico
- E. cameronensis Gertsch & Davis, 1936 – USA
- E. catarina Poeta, 2014 – Brazil
- E. cazieri Levi, 1977 – USA, Bahamas, Turks & Caicos
- E. cepina (Walckenaer, 1841) – North America
- E. cidae Poeta, 2014 – Brazil
- E. clavispina (O. Pickard-Cambridge, 1889) – USA to El Salvador
- E. conchlea (McCook, 1888) – USA, Mexico
- E. conformans Chamberlin, 1925 – Panama
- E. crista Poeta, Marques & Buckup, 2010 – Brazil
- E. cuia Poeta, 2014 – Brazil
- E. davalosae Pett & Pai-Gibson, 2024 – Paraguay
- E. delasmata Bryant, 1945 – Mexico, Dominican Republic
- E. delecta Chickering, 1955 – Panama
- E. devia (Gertsch & Mulaik, 1936) – USA to Panama, Caribbean
- E. eldorado Poeta, 2014 – Brazil
- E. eleuthera Levi, 1977 – USA, Bahamas, Jamaica
- E. emertoni (Banks, 1904) – USA, Mexico
- E. ericae Poeta, 2014 – Brazil
- E. exigua Chickering, 1955 – Panama
- E. farroupilha Poeta, 2014 – Brazil
- E. fragilis (O. Pickard-Cambridge, 1889) – Guatemala, Panama
- E. fuscovittata (Keyserling, 1864) – Mexico, Central America, Caribbean, Northern South America, possibly to Paraguay.
- E. gonygaster (C. L. Koch, 1838) – Brazil, Guyana
- E. guarani Poeta, 2014 – Brazil
- E. guianensis (Taczanowski, 1873) – Peru, French Guiana
- E. guttata F. O. Pickard-Cambridge, 1904 – Mexico to Brazil
- E. histrio Mello-Leitão, 1948 – Panama, Guyana
- E. illicita (O. Pickard-Cambridge, 1889) – Mexico, Guatemala, limited reports to Northern Brazil
- E. inconstans Chickering, 1955 – Panama
- E. ingenua Chickering, 1955 – Guatemala to Panama
- E. innoxia Chickering, 1955 – Panama
- E. itapocuensis Strand, 1916 – Brazil
- E. lata Chickering, 1955 – Panama
- E. latebricola (O. Pickard-Cambridge, 1889) – Guatemala to Panama
- E. levii Poeta, Marques & Buckup, 2010 – Brazil
- E. lisei Poeta, 2014 – Brazil, Uruguay
- E. lunulifera Mello-Leitão, 1939 – French Guiana, Guyana
- E. maxima Chickering, 1955 – Panama
- E. meridionalis Baert, 2014 – Galapagos islands
- E. mimica Chickering, 1955 – Panama
- E. minuscula (Keyserling, 1892) – Brazil
- E. monticola Chamberlin, 1916 – Peru
- E. montivaga Chickering, 1955 – Panama
- E. mourei Mello-Leitão, 1947 – Brazil
- E. mucronatella (Roewer, 1942) – Brazil
- E. nasuta Mello-Leitão, 1939 – Panama, Guyana, Brazil
- E. novemmamillata Mello-Leitão, 1941 – Argentina
- E. oblonga Chickering, 1955 – Panama
- E. occidentalis Baert, 2014 – Galapagos Islands
- E. orientalis Baert, 2014 – Galapagos Islands
- E. pallida Mello-Leitão, 1940 – Brazil
- E. palmares Poeta, Marques & Buckup, 2010 – Brazil, Uruguay, Argentina
- E. perdita Bryant, 1945 – Hispaniola
- E. perfida Mello-Leitão, 1947 – Brazil, Uruguay
- E. photographica Mello-Leitão, 1944 – Brazil, Uruguay, Argentina
- E. redundans Chickering, 1955 – Panama
- E. rosae Chamberlin & Ivie, 1935 – USA, Mexico
- E. rubroguttulata (Keyserling, 1879) – Peru
- E. rustica Chickering, 1955 – Panama
- E. saga (Keyserling, 1893) – Brazil, Uruguay
- E. sagana (Keyserling, 1893) – Brazil
- E. scitula Chickering, 1955 – Mexico to Panama
- E. scutigera (O. Pickard-Cambridge, 1898) – Mexico to Panama
- E. secta Mello-Leitão, 1945 – Brazil, Argentina
- E. sedula Chickering, 1955 – Panama
- E. semifoliata (O. Pickard-Cambridge, 1899) – Central America
- E. smaragdinea (Taczanowski, 1878) – Peru
- E. tantula Chickering, 1955 – Panama
- E. taquara (Keyserling, 1892) – Brazil, Uruguay, Argentina
- E. tribrachiata Badcock, 1932 – Paraguay
- E. trinitatis (Hogg, 1918) – Trinidad
- E. ulecebrosa (Keyserling, 1892) – Brazil, Argentina
- E. unimaculata Franganillo, 1930 – Cuba
- E. vegeta (Keyserling, 1865) – Mexico to Brazil, Hispaniola
- E. vellardi Mello-Leitão, 1924 – Brazil, Paraguay
- E. viridipedata (Roewer, 1942) – Peru
- E. wiedenmeyeri Schenkel, 1953 – Venezuela
