= Mangora passiva =

Scientific classification
- Domain: Eukaryota
- Kingdom: Animalia
- Phylum: Arthropoda
- Subphylum: Chelicerata
- Class: Arachnida
- Order: Araneae
- Infraorder: Araneomorphae
- Family: Araneidae
- Genus: Mangora
- Species: M. passiva

Binomial name
- Mangora passiva (O. P.-Cambridge, 1889)

Species of spider

Mangora passiva is a species of orb weaver in the family Araneidae. It is found in a range from the USA to Nicaragua.
