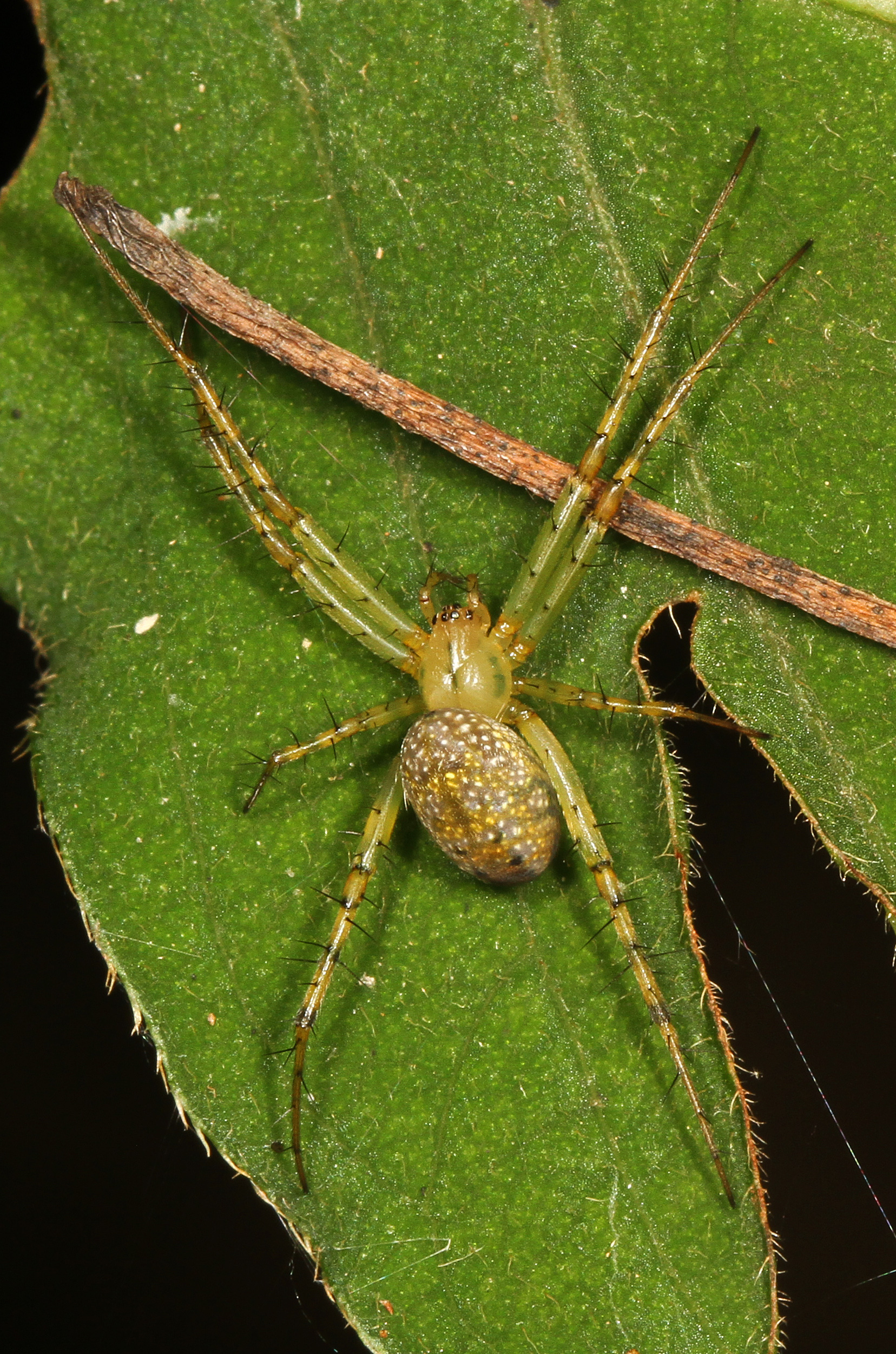

Scientific classification
- Domain: Eukaryota
- Kingdom: Animalia
- Phylum: Arthropoda
- Subphylum: Chelicerata
- Class: Arachnida
- Order: Araneae
- Infraorder: Araneomorphae
- Family: Araneidae
- Genus: Mangora
- Species: M. maculata

Binomial name
- Mangora maculata (Keyserling, 1865)

= Mangora maculata =

Species of spider

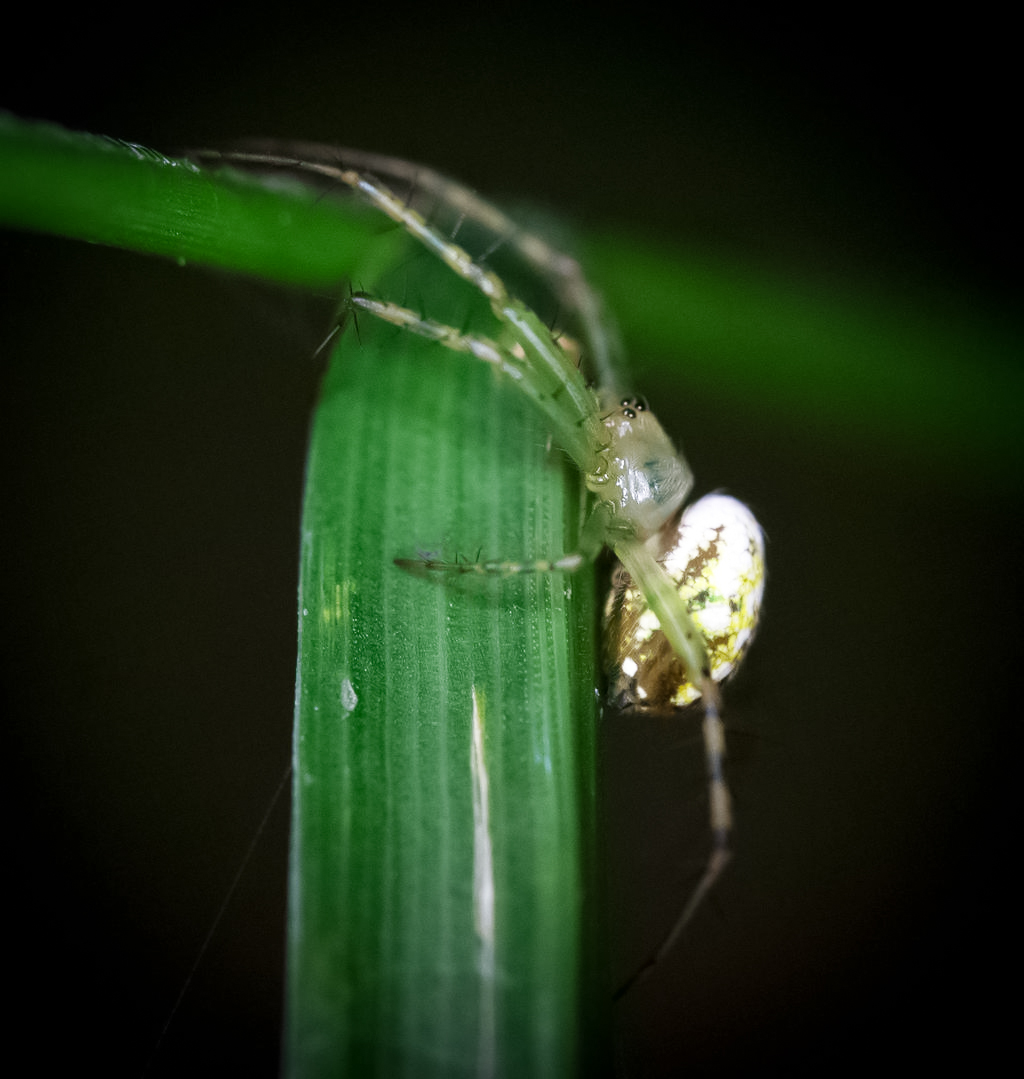
Greenlegged Orbweaver (Mangora maculata)

Mangora maculata, the greenlegged orbweaver, is a species of orb weaver in the spider family Araneidae. It is found in the United States.

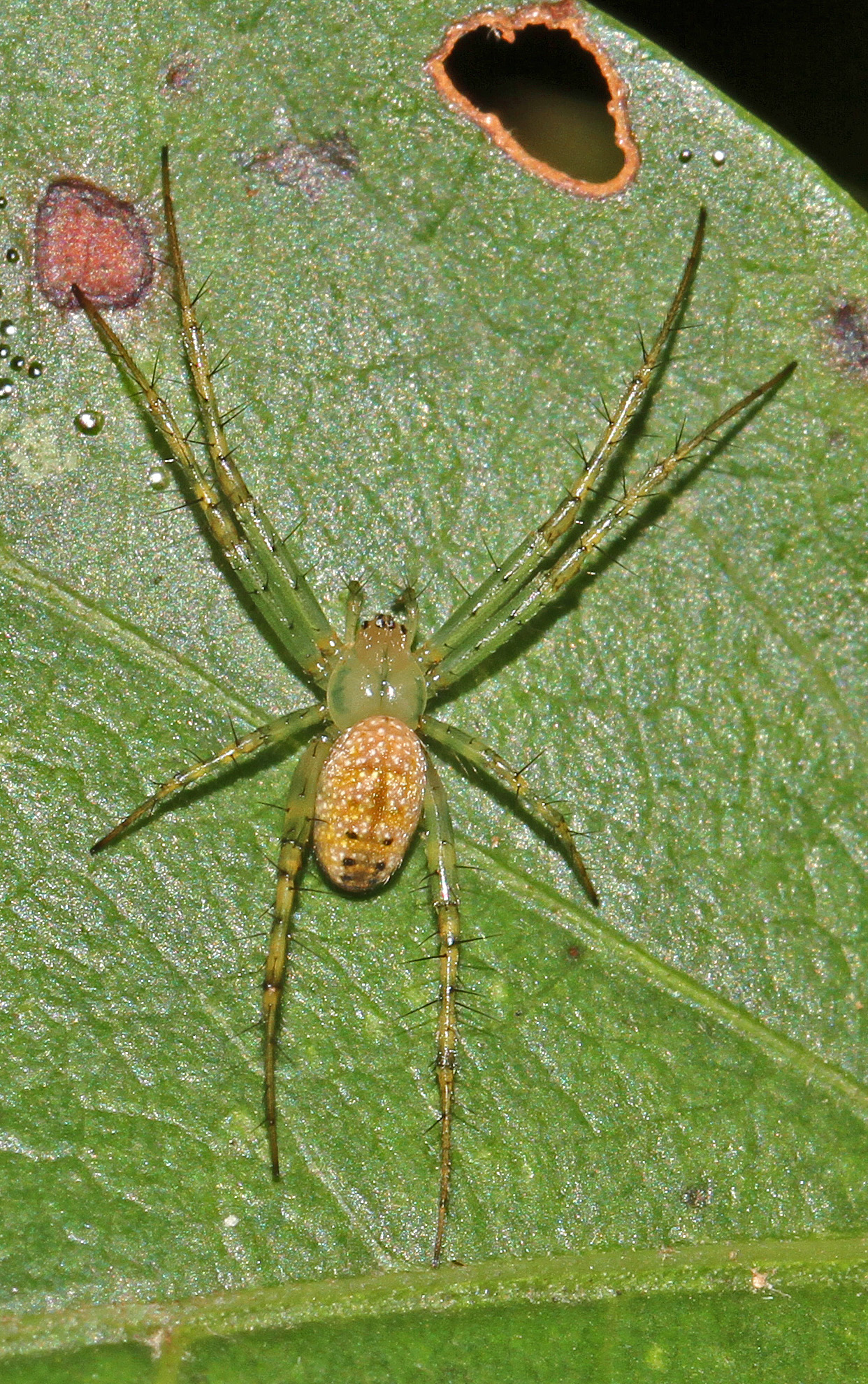
Greenlegged orbweaver, Mangora maculata

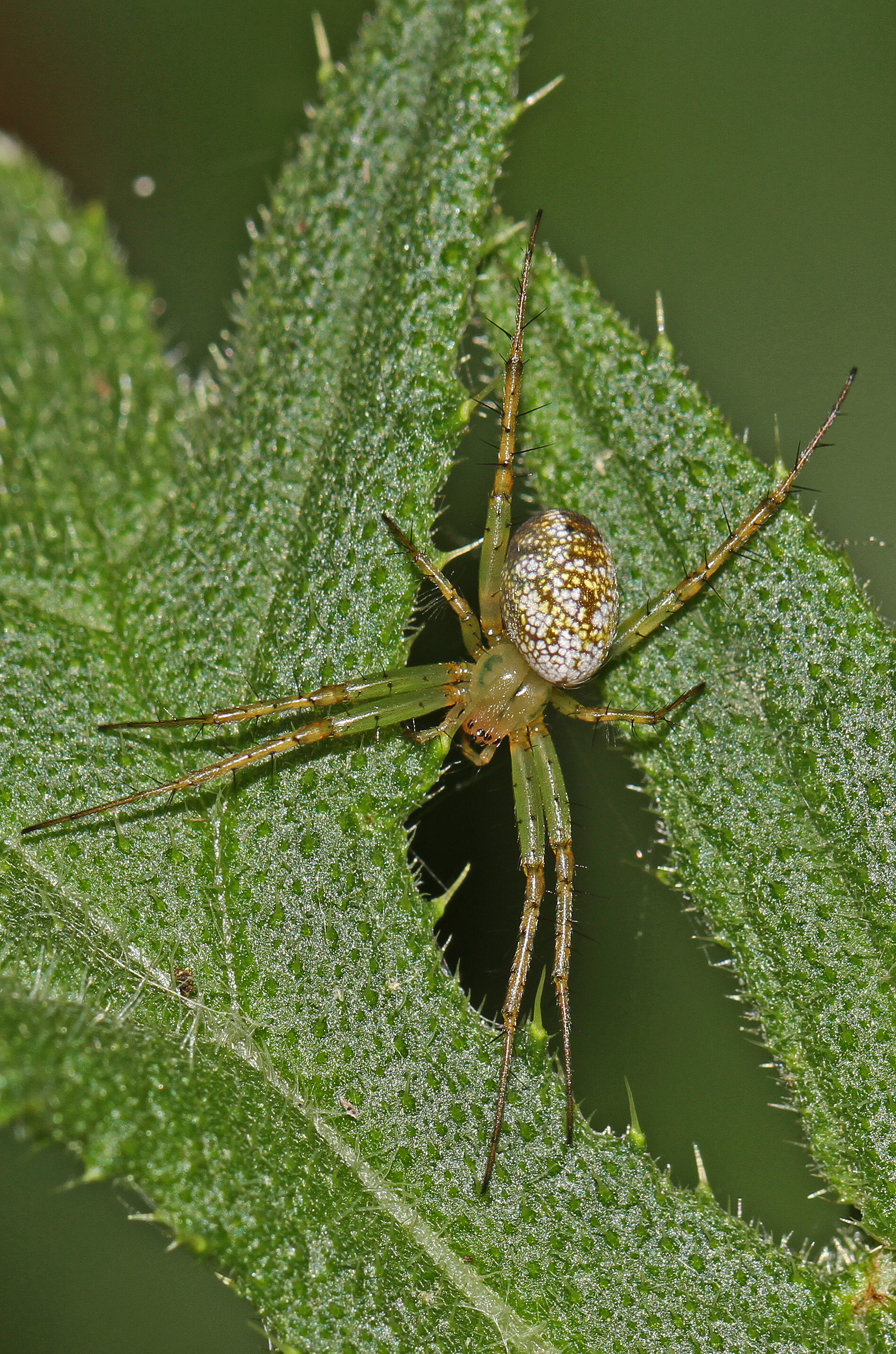
Greenlegged orbweaver, Mangora maculata
