= Eustala conchlea =

Scientific classification
- Kingdom: Animalia
- Phylum: Arthropoda
- Subphylum: Chelicerata
- Class: Arachnida
- Order: Araneae
- Infraorder: Araneomorphae
- Family: Araneidae
- Genus: Eustala
- Species: E. conchlea

Binomial name
- Eustala conchlea (McCook, 1888)

Species of spider

Eustala conchlea is a species of orb weaver in the spider family Araneidae. It is found in the United States and Mexico.
