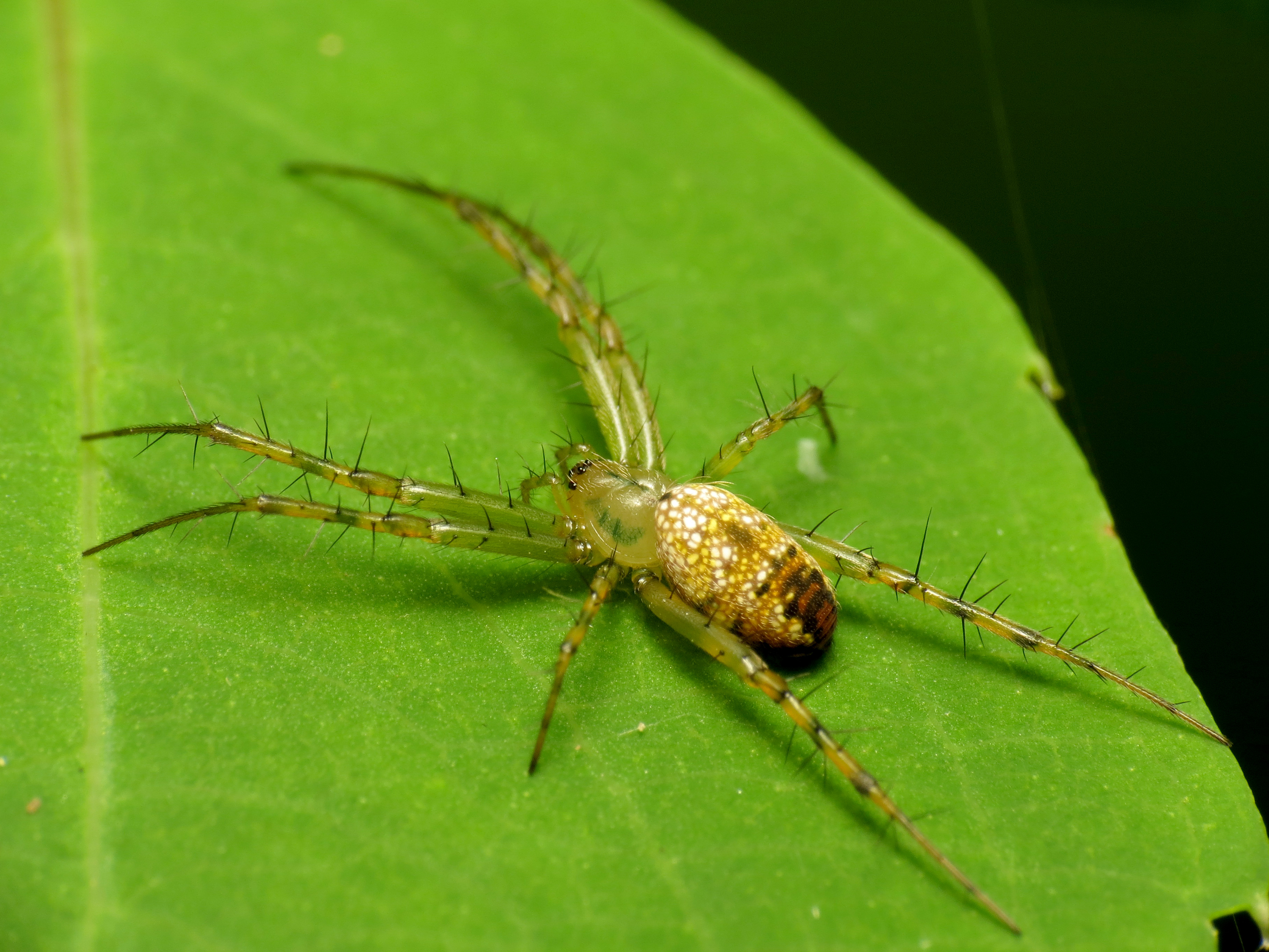

Scientific classification
- Domain: Eukaryota
- Kingdom: Animalia
- Phylum: Arthropoda
- Subphylum: Chelicerata
- Class: Arachnida
- Order: Araneae
- Infraorder: Araneomorphae
- Family: Araneidae
- Genus: Mangora
- Species: M. spiculata

Binomial name
- Mangora spiculata (Hentz, 1847)

= Mangora spiculata =

Species of spider

Mangora spiculata is a species of orb weaver in the family Araneidae. It is found in North America.

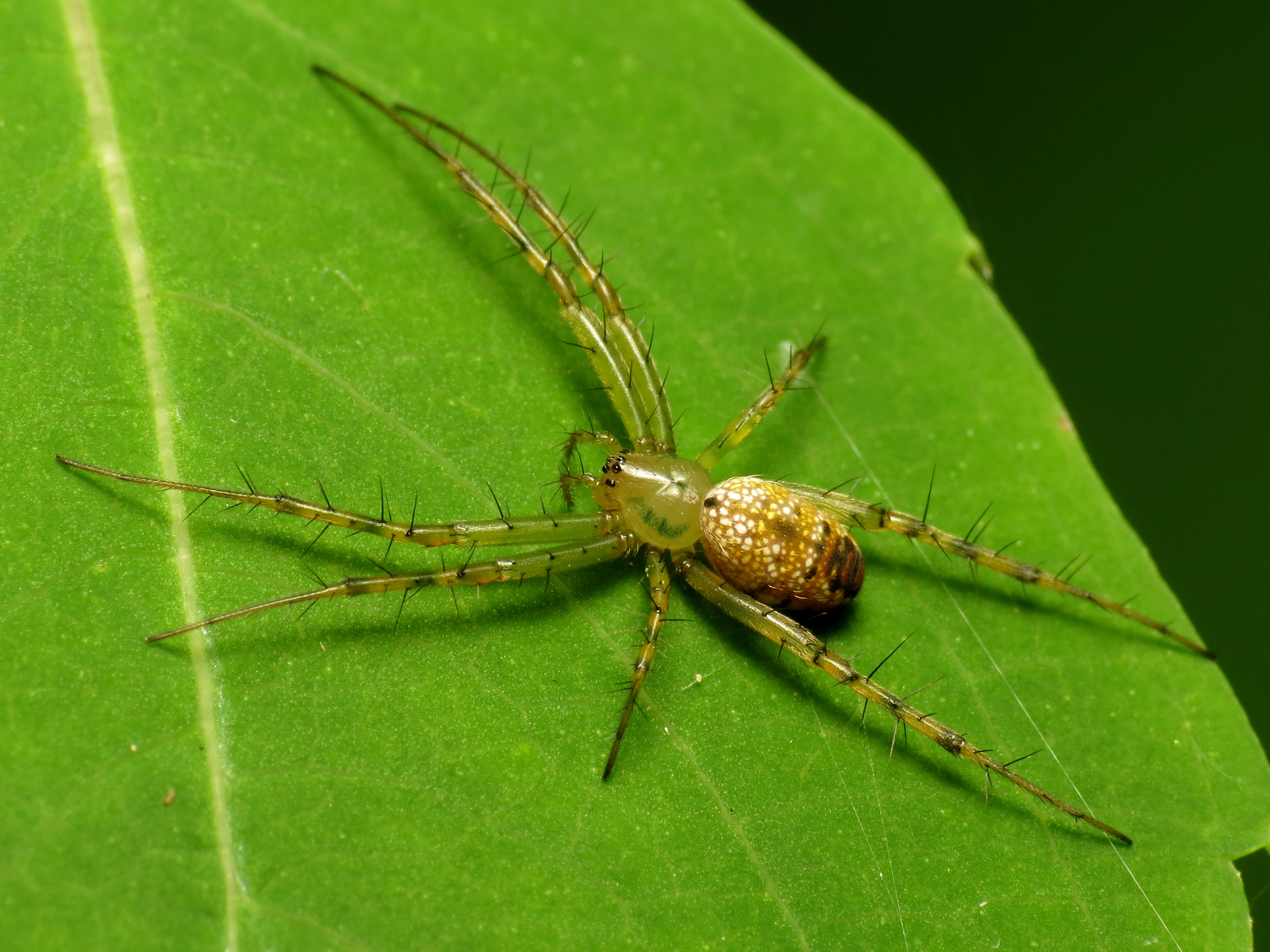
