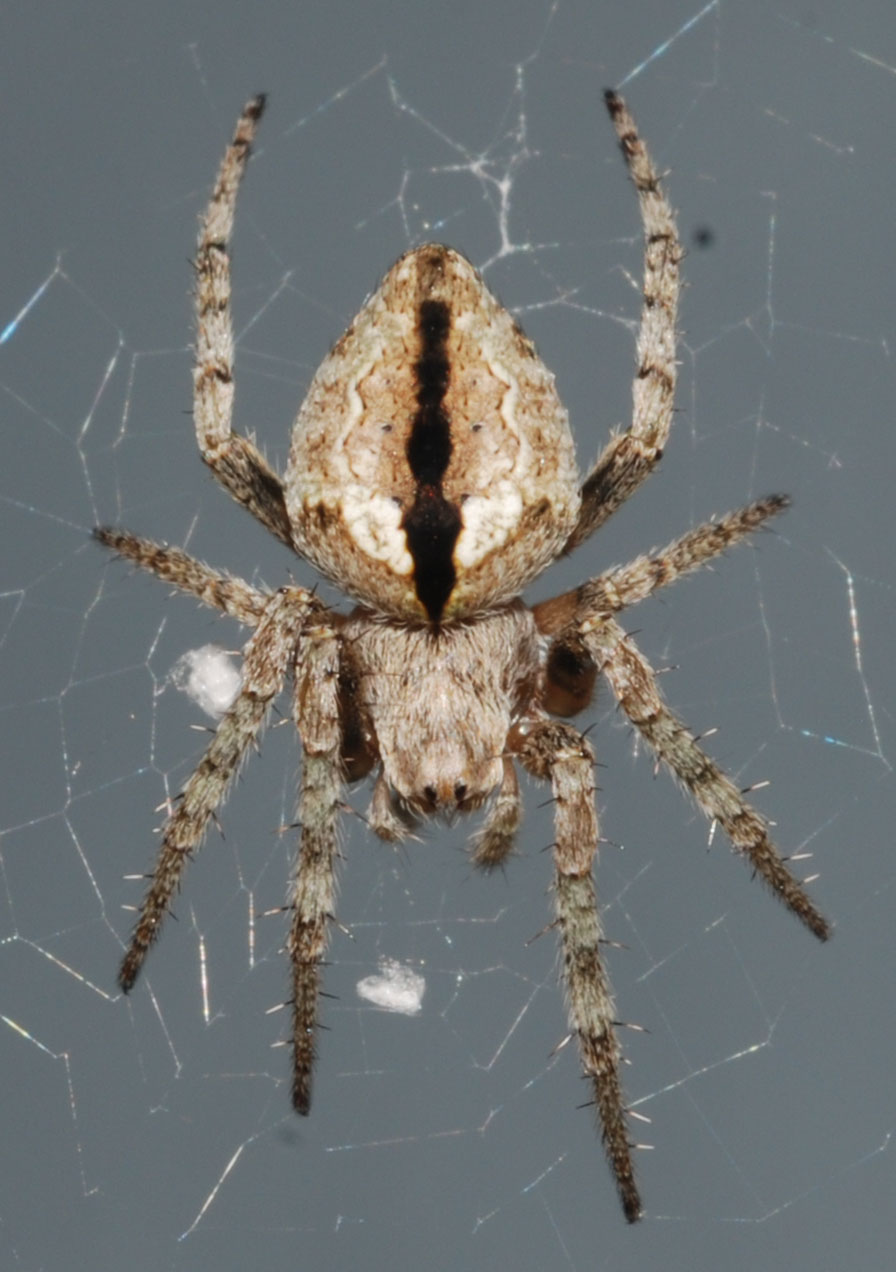

Scientific classification
- Kingdom: Animalia
- Phylum: Arthropoda
- Subphylum: Chelicerata
- Class: Arachnida
- Order: Araneae
- Infraorder: Araneomorphae
- Family: Araneidae
- Genus: Eustala
- Species: E. anastera

Binomial name
- Eustala anastera (Walckenaer, 1841)

= Eustala anastera =

Species of spider

Eustala anastera, the humpbacked orbweaver, is a species of orb weaver in the family Araneidae. It is found in North and Central America.

== Description ==
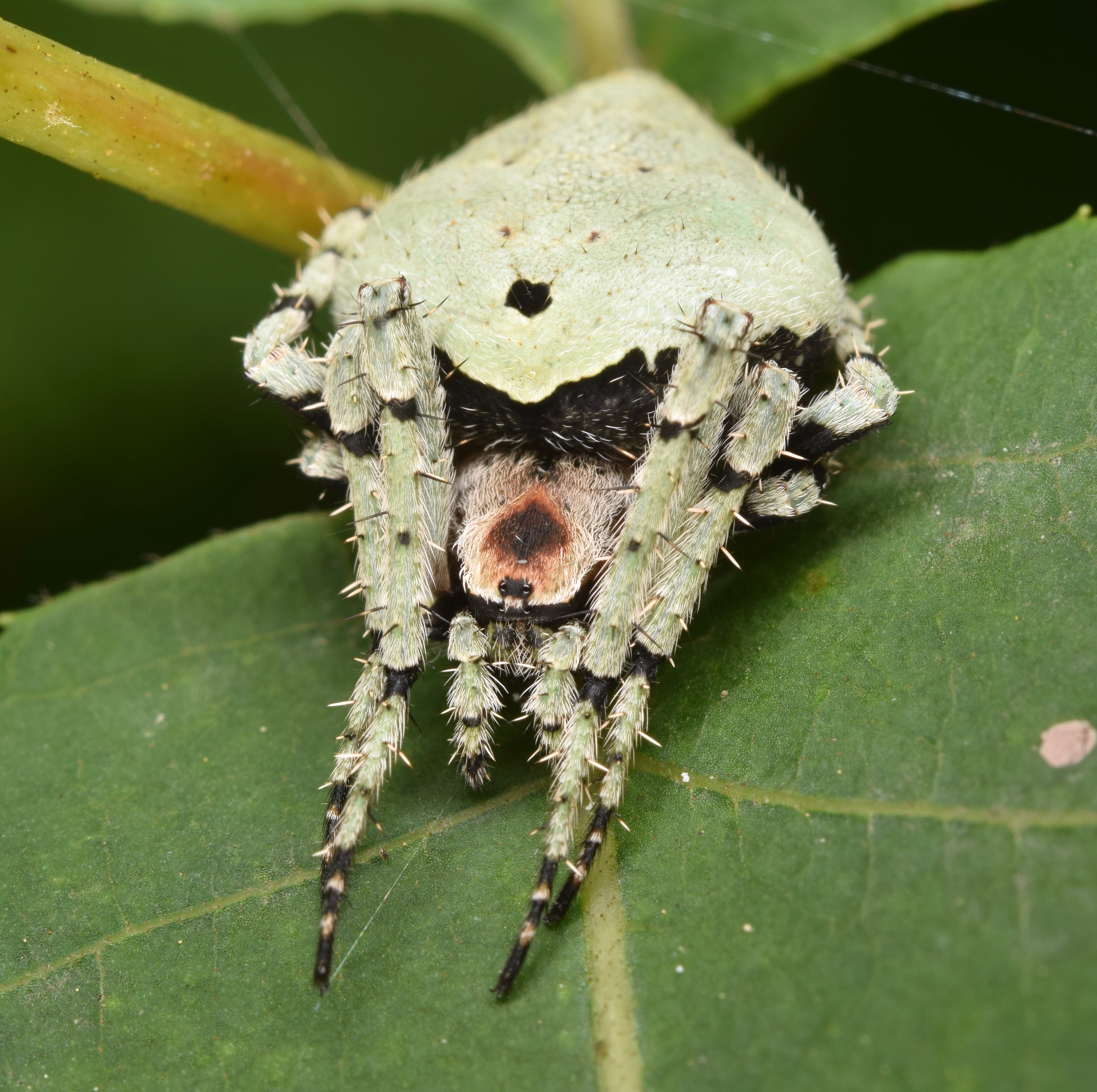

Females of this species grow to 10mm, males growing to 9.5mm. The coloration of the prosoma is quite variable in color, though it usually matches that of the opisthosoma. The coloration can vary from tones of tan, to vivid green. Some have a dark line along the median, as the one pictured, and many have a foliate pattern. The legs are also quite variable, and are covered in short spines, which are most notable in males.

== Subspecies ==
- Eustala anastera anastera (Walckenaer, 1841)
- Eustala anastera vermiformis Franganillo, 1931
