= Centro Femenino del Paraguay =

Centro Feminista Paraguayo (Paraguayan Feminist Center) or Centro Femenino del Paraguay (CFP) (Women's Centre of Paraguay) was a women's organization in Paraguay, founded in 1921. It played an important role in the women's movement in Paraguay.

== History ==
The movement to expand women's rights in Paraguay grew significantly in the 1920s, in large part through the work of María Felicidad González, who represented her country at a feminist conference in Baltimore, in 1922. On April 26, 1921, she co-founded the Centro Femenino del Paraguay (CFP) (Women's Centre of Paraguay). Influenced by women's rights movements in North America and Europe, Paraguayan women also began to mobilize and claim their rights. During this period, feminism was associated with the Revolutionary Febrerista Party.

Centro Feminista Paraguayo (Paraguayan Feminist Center), which was pushing for passage of the draft law on equal rights between men and women, introduced by deputy Telémaco Silvera.

The Center was the first feminist organization in Paraguay. It included members such as Virginia Corvalán, Serafina Dávalos, Carmen Garcete, Carmen Gatti, Felicidad González, Adela Ibáñez, Ermelinda Ortiz, Sabrina Sapena Pastor, Catalina Steward, and Elida Ugarriza, among many others.
