= Mercedes Sandoval de Hempel =

Paraguayan lawyer and feminist

Mercedes Sandoval de Hempel (February 8, 1919 – February 7, 2005) was a Paraguayan lawyer and feminist. She was one of the leading proponents of women's suffrage in the country, drafting the Anteproyecto de Ley de Reforma Parcial del Código Civil (Bill partially amending the Civil Code). In 1992, the amendment of the Paraguayan Civil Code finally recognized equality between men and women. The wording of Article 1 of Law 704/61 was simple: “Reconócese a la mujer los mismos derechos y obligaciones políticos que al hombre.” (It is hereby recognized that women have the same political rights and obligations as men.)

== Career ==
A graduate from the Faculty of Law at the Universidad Nacional de Asunción, she specialized in labor and civil law and then in family law, women and minors. Sandoval founded the Paraguayan League for the Rights of Women (Liga Paraguaya de los Derechos de la Mujer) and the Paraguayan Association of University Graduates (Asociación Paraguaya de Universitarias Graduadas), serving as chair of both organizations. She also created the Asociación de Mujeres Profesionales y de Negocios, the Consejo Nacional de Mujeres del Paraguay and the Coordinación de Mujeres del Paraguay, and was adviser to the Paraguayan Committee for Cooperation with the Inter-American Commission of Women (CIM-OAS) (Cooperación con la Comisión Interamericana de Mujeres), among other feminist institutions. CLADEM (Comité de América Latina y El Caribe para la Defensa de los Derechos de la Mujer; Committee for Latin America and the Caribbean for the Defense of Women's Rights) Paraguay nominated Sandoval as a candidate for the "1000 Women for the Nobel Peace Prize 2005" as a part of the PeaceWomen Across the Globe initiative.

Sandoval was married, but the couple separated after eighteen years. They had one child, Anna Mercedes Hempel Sandoval, who became a teacher. Sandoval suffered a stroke and used a wheelchair before her death in Asunción in 2005.

== Honors ==
- Distinction of the Inter-American Commission of Women (CIM-OAS)
- Soroptimist International Club recognition, the Guairá Lawyers Forum of the Association of Secretaries of Paraguay and Lions Club
- Candidate 1000 Mujeres para el Premio Nobel 2005, nominated by the Committee for Latin America and the Caribbean for the Defense of the Rights of Women (2005)
- Parliament distinction, postmortem, Congressional of Women Paraguay (2012)

== Selected works ==
- Anteproyecto de Ley de Reforma Parcial del Código Civil (1989)
- El derecho de la familia en el Paraguay: estudio realizado en el Centro Paraguayo de Estudios de Población para el Grupo Parlamentario Interamericano sobre Población y Desarrollo (with Nelly Obregón de González & Alicia Pucheta de Correa; 1986)

== Bibliography ==
- Rodríguez, Pablo (1 January 2004). La familia en Iberoamérica, 1550–1980. Universidad Externado de Colombia. ISBN 978-958-698-134-7.
