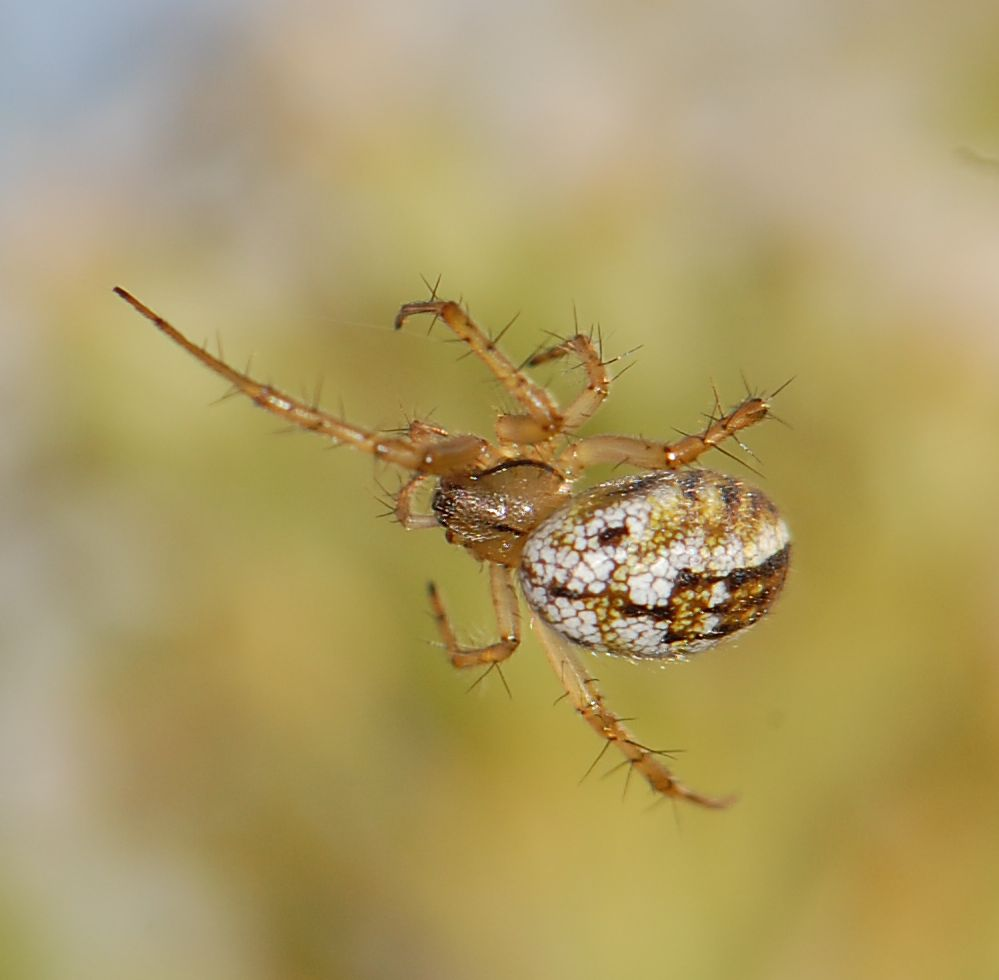
- Mangora acalypha
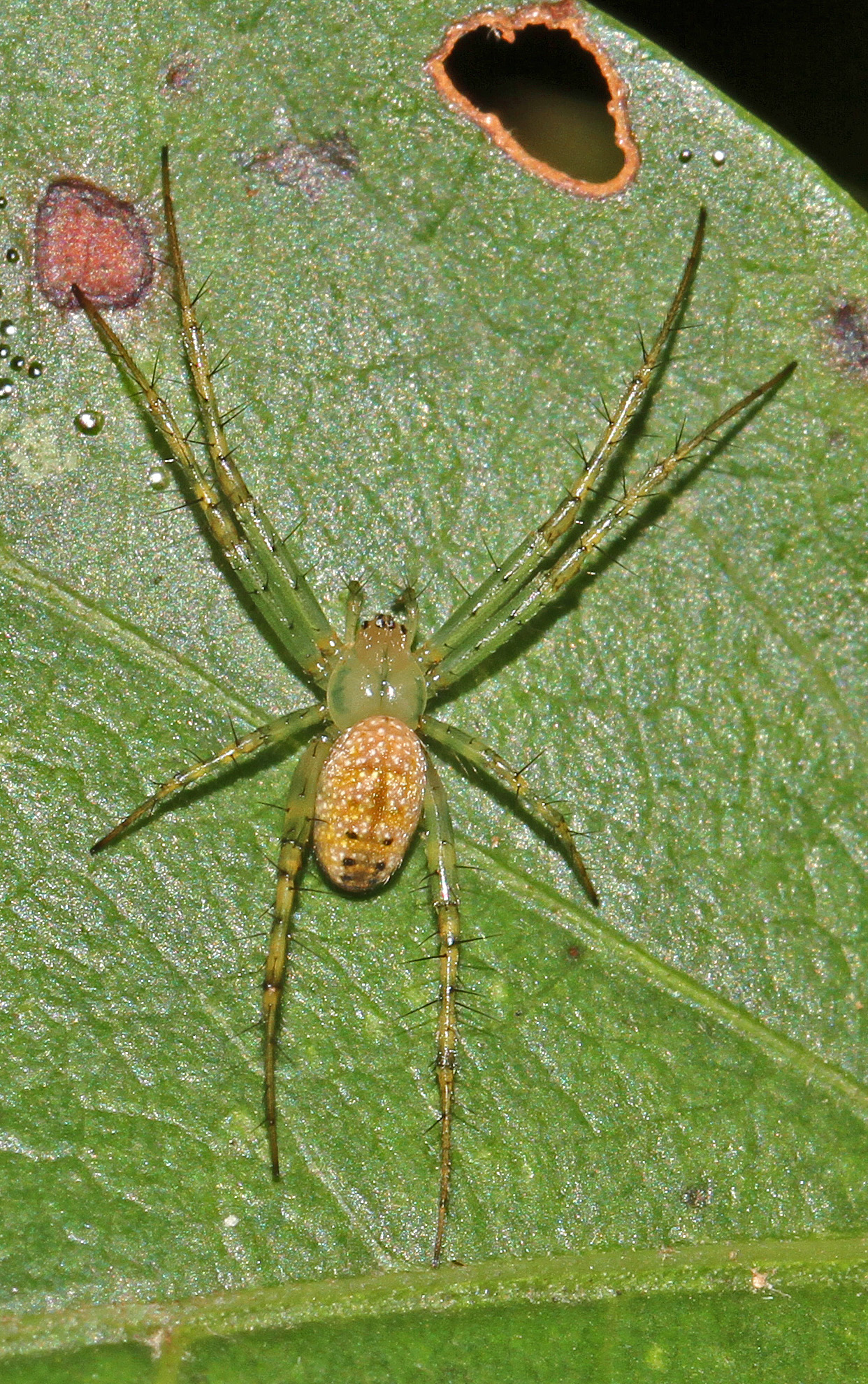
- Mangora maculata from Woodbridge, Virginia

Scientific classification
- Kingdom: Animalia
- Phylum: Arthropoda
- Subphylum: Chelicerata
- Class: Arachnida
- Order: Araneae
- Infraorder: Araneomorphae
- Family: Araneidae
- Genus: Mangora; O. Pickard-Cambridge, 1889

Type species
- M. picta O. Pickard-Cambridge, 1889

Species
- 186, see text

= Mangora (spider) =

Genus of spiders

Mangora is a genus of orb-weaver spiders first described by O. Pickard-Cambridge in 1889.

== Species ==
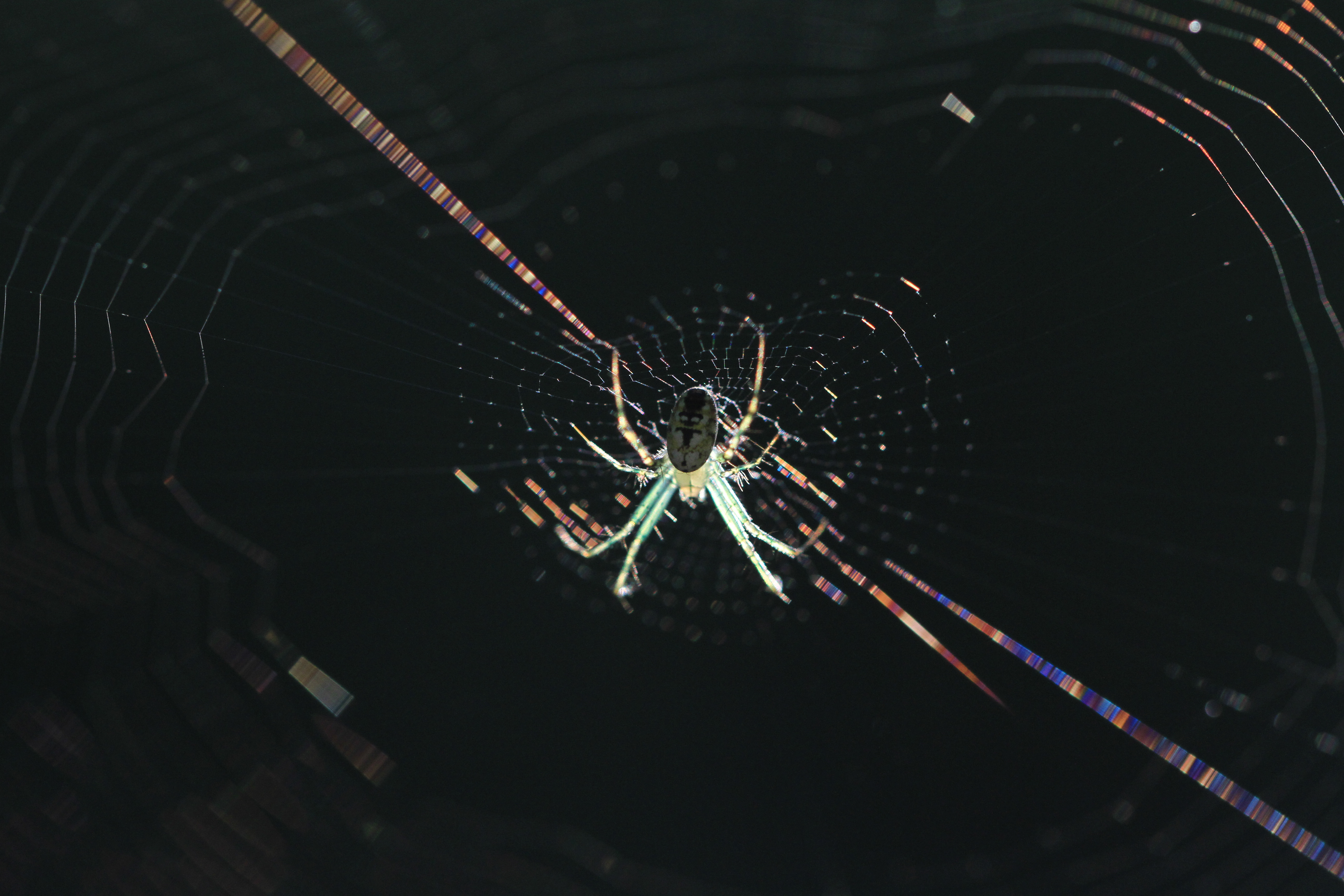
Mangora spiculata from Woodbridge, Virginia

As of November 2026 it contains 190 species in the Americas and Afro-Eurasia:

- M. acalypha (Walckenaer, 1802) – Azores, Madeira, Europe, North Africa, Turkey, Middle East, Kazakhstan, Caucasus, Russia (Europe to South Siberia), Central Asia, China
- M. acaponeta Levi, 2005 – Mexico
- M. acoripa Levi, 2007 – Brazil
- M. acre Levi, 2007 – Colombia, Peru, Brazil
- M. alinahui Levi, 2007 – Ecuador, Bolivia, Brazil
- M. amacayacu Levi, 2007 – Colombia, Venezuela, Peru, Brazil
- M. amchickeringi Levi, 2005 – Panama, Colombia, Venezuela, Trinidad
- M. angulopicta Yin, Wang, Xie & Peng, 1990 – China
- M. anilensis Levi, 2007 – Brazil
- M. antillana Dierkens, 2012 – Martinique
- M. antonio Levi, 2007 – Brazil
- M. apaporis Levi, 2007 – Colombia, Peru
- M. apobama Levi, 2007 – Peru, Bolivia, Brazil
- M. argenteostriata Simon, 1897 – Brazil
- M. aripeba Levi, 2007 – Brazil
- M. aripuana Levi, 2007 – Brazil
- M. asis Levi, 2007 – Colombia
- M. ayo Levi, 2007 – Colombia
- M. baii Mi & Li, 2021 – China, India
- M. balbina Levi, 2007 – Brazil
- M. bambusa Levi, 2007 – Colombia
- M. barba Levi, 2007 – Colombia
- M. bemberg Levi, 2007 – Brazil, Argentina
- M. bimaculata (O. Pickard-Cambridge, 1889) – Mexico to Costa Rica
- M. blumenau Levi, 2007 – Brazil
- M. bocaina Levi, 2007 – Brazil
- M. bonaldoi Levi, 2007 – Brazil
- M. botelho Levi, 2007 – Brazil
- M. bovis Levi, 2007 – Brazil, Guyana
- M. boyaca Levi, 2007 – Colombia
- M. brokopondo Levi, 2007 – Brazil, Guyana, Suriname, French Guiana
- M. browns Levi, 2007 – Suriname
- M. caballero Levi, 2007 – Brazil, Argentina
- M. cajuta Levi, 2007 – Bolivia
- M. calcarifera F. O. Pickard-Cambridge, 1904 – United States to Costa Rica
- M. campeche Levi, 2005 – Mexico
- M. candida Chickering, 1954 – Panama
- M. caparu Levi, 2007 – Colombia
- M. castelo Levi, 2007 – Brazil
- M. caxias Levi, 2007 – Brazil, Argentina
- M. cephala Mi & Li, 2021 – China
- M. cercado Levi, 2007 – Brazil
- M. chacobo Levi, 2007 – Peru, Bolivia, Brazil
- M. chanchamayo Levi, 2007 – Peru
- M. chao Levi, 2007 – Brazil, Paraguay
- M. chavantina Levi, 2007 – Brazil, French Guiana
- M. chicanna Levi, 2005 – Mexico to Honduras
- M. chiguaza Levi, 2007 – Ecuador, Peru
- M. chispa Levi, 2007 – Peru
- M. chuquisaca Levi, 2007 – Bolivia, Argentina
- M. cochuna Levi, 2007 – Peru, Argentina
- M. colonche Levi, 2007 – Peru, Ecuador
- M. comaina Levi, 2007 – Peru
- M. corcovado Levi, 2005 – Costa Rica
- M. corocito Levi, 2007 – Venezuela, French Guiana
- M. craigae Levi, 2005 – Costa Rica
- M. crescopicta Yin, Wang, Xie & Peng, 1990 – China, Korea
- M. cutucu Levi, 2007 – Ecuador
- M. dagua Levi, 2007 – Colombia
- M. dianasilvae Levi, 2007 – Colombia, Venezuela, Trinidad, Peru, Bolivia, Brazil
- M. distincta Chickering, 1963 – Honduras to Costa Rica
- M. divisor Levi, 2007 – Brazil
- M. eberhardi Levi, 2007 – Colombia
- M. engleri Levi, 2007 – Ecuador
- M. enseada Levi, 2007 – Brazil, Argentina
- M. explorama Levi, 2007 – Peru
- M. falconae Schenkel, 1953 – Panama, Colombia, Venezuela
- M. fascialata Franganillo, 1936 – United States to Honduras, Cuba, Hispaniola, Trinidad
- M. florestal Levi, 2007 – Brazil
- M. foliosa Zhu & Yin, 1998 – China
- M. fornicata (Keyserling, 1864) – Colombia
- M. fortuna Levi, 2005 – Costa Rica, Panama
- M. fundo Levi, 2007 – Brazil
- M. gibberosa (Hentz, 1847) – North America
- M. goodnightorum Levi, 2005 – Mexico
- M. grande Levi, 2007 – Venezuela
- M. hemicraera (Thorell, 1890) – Malaysia
- M. herbeoides (Bösenberg & Strand, 1906) – China, Korea, Japan
- M. hirtipes (Taczanowski, 1878) – Peru, Brazil, Guyana, French Guiana
- M. huallaga Levi, 2007 – Peru, Bolivia
- M. huancabamba Levi, 2007 – Peru
- M. ikuruwa Levi, 2007 – Venezuela, Guyana, French Guiana, Peru
- M. inconspicua Schenkel, 1936 – China
- M. insperata Soares & Camargo, 1948 – Colombia, Peru, Brazil
- M. isabel Levi, 2007 – Brazil, French Guiana
- M. itabapuana Levi, 2007 – Brazil
- M. itatiaia Levi, 2007 – Brazil
- M. itza Levi, 2005 – Mexico
- M. ixtapan Levi, 2005 – Mexico
- M. jumboe Levi, 2007 – Ecuador
- M. karschi (Roewer, 1942) – São Tomé and Príncipe
- M. keduc Levi, 2007 – Brazil
- M. kochalkai Levi, 2007 – Colombia
- M. kuntur Levi, 2007 – Peru
- M. lactea Mello-Leitão, 1944 – Bolivia, Brazil, Argentina
- M. laga Levi, 2007 – Peru
- M. latica Levi, 2007 – Colombia
- M. lechugal Levi, 2007 – Peru, Ecuador
- M. leticia Levi, 2007 – Colombia
- M. leucogasteroides Roewer, 1955 – Myanmar
- M. leverger Levi, 2007 – Brazil, Paraguay
- M. logrono Levi, 2007 – Ecuador
- M. maculata (Keyserling, 1865) – United States
- M. mamiraua Levi, 2007 – Brazil
- M. manglar Levi, 2007 – Ecuador
- M. manicore Levi, 2007 – Brazil
- M. mapia Levi, 2007 – Brazil
- M. matamata Levi, 2007 – Colombia
- M. mathani Simon, 1895 – Colombia, Peru, Ecuador, Brazil
- M. maximiano Levi, 2007 – Brazil
- M. melanocephala (Taczanowski, 1874) – Mexico to Argentina
- M. melanoleuca Mello-Leitão, 1941 – Argentina
- M. melloleitaoi Levi, 2007 – Brazil
- M. minacu Levi, 2007 – Brazil
- M. missa Levi, 2007 – Brazil, Argentina
- M. mitu Levi, 2007 – Colombia
- M. mobilis (O. Pickard-Cambridge, 1889) – Mexico to Honduras
- M. montana Chickering, 1954 – Costa Rica, Panama
- M. morona Levi, 2007 – Ecuador, Brazil
- M. moyobamba Levi, 2007 – Peru
- M. nahuatl Levi, 2005 – Mexico
- M. nonoai Levi, 2007 – Brazil
- M. novempupillata Mello-Leitão, 1940 – Colombia, Peru, Bolivia, Brazil
- M. nuco Levi, 2007 – Peru
- M. oaxaca Levi, 2005 – Mexico
- M. ordaz Levi, 2007 – Venezuela
- M. ouropreto Santos & Santos, 2011 – Brazil
- M. oxapampa Levi, 2007 – Peru
- M. pagoreni Levi, 2007 – Peru
- M. palenque Levi, 2007 – Ecuador
- M. paranaiba Levi, 2007 – Brazil
- M. passiva (O. Pickard-Cambridge, 1889) – United States to Nicaragua
- M. paula Levi, 2007 – Brazil
- M. peichiuta Levi, 2007 – Paraguay
- M. pepino Levi, 2007 – Colombia
- M. pia Chamberlin & Ivie, 1936 – Panama, Colombia, Venezuela, Brazil
- M. picta O. Pickard-Cambridge, 1889 – Mexico to Honduras
- M. pira Levi, 2007 – Colombia
- M. piratini Rodrigues & Mendonça, 2011 – Brazil
- M. piroca Levi, 2007 – Brazil
- M. placida (Hentz, 1847) – North America
- M. polypicula Yin, Wang, Xie & Peng, 1990 – China
- M. porcullo Levi, 2007 – Peru
- M. puerto Levi, 2007 – Peru
- M. punctipes (Taczanowski, 1878) – Peru
- M. purulha Levi, 2005 – Guatemala
- M. ramirezi Levi, 2007 – Brazil, Argentina
- M. rhombopicta Yin, Wang, Xie & Peng, 1990 – China
- M. rondonia Levi, 2007 – Brazil
- M. rupununi Levi, 2007 – Guyana
- M. sandovalae Pett & Pai-Gibson, 2024 – Paraguay
- M. saut Levi, 2007 – French Guiana
- M. schneirlai Chickering, 1954 – Costa Rica, Panama
- M. sciosciae Levi, 2007 – Argentina
- M. semiargentea Simon, 1895 – Sri Lanka
- M. semiatra Levi, 2007 – Colombia, Venezuela, Peru
- M. shudikar Levi, 2007 – Guyana
- M. sobradinho Levi, 2007 – Brazil
- M. socorpa Levi, 2007 – Colombia
- M. songyangensis Yin, Wang, Xie & Peng, 1990 – China
- M. spiculata (Hentz, 1847) – United States, China
- M. strenua (Keyserling, 1893) – Brazil, Argentina
- M. sturmi Levi, 2007 – Colombia
- M. sufflava Chickering, 1963 – Panama
- M. sumauma Levi, 2007 – Brazil
- M. taboquinha Levi, 2007 – Brazil
- M. taczanowskii Levi, 2007 – Peru
- M. tambo Levi, 2007 – Peru
- M. taraira Levi, 2007 – Colombia
- M. tarapuy Levi, 2007 – Ecuador, Brazil
- M. tarma Levi, 2007 – Peru
- M. tefe Levi, 2007 – Colombia, Ecuador, Brazil
- M. theridioides Mello-Leitão, 1948 – Guyana
- M. tschekiangensis Schenkel, 1963 – China
- M. umbrata Simon, 1897 – Peru
- M. unam Levi, 2007 – Colombia, Peru, Brazil
- M. uraricoera Levi, 2007 – Colombia, Venezuela, Peru, Ecuador, Brazil, Guyana, Suriname, French Guiana
- M. uru Levi, 2007 – Peru
- M. uziga Levi, 2007 – Paraguay, Argentina
- M. v-signata Mello-Leitão, 1943 – Bolivia, Brazil, Argentina
- M. vaupes Levi, 2007 – Colombia
- M. velha Levi, 2007 – Brazil
- M. vianai Levi, 2007 – Argentina
- M. villeta Levi, 2007 – Colombia
- M. vito Levi, 2005 – Costa Rica
- M. volcan Levi, 2005 – Panama
- M. yacupoi Levi, 2007 – Argentina
- M. yungas Levi, 2007 – Argentina
- M. zepol Levi, 2007 – Colombia
- M. zona Levi, 2007 – Peru
