= Unión Femenina del Paraguay =

Unión Femenina del Paraguay (UFP) was a women's organization in Paraguay, founded in 1936. It played an important role in the women's movement in Paraguay.

It was founded after the February revolution and built upon a Socialist perspective.

The purpose was to campaign for women's rights from a Socialist Feminist perspective. UFP contacted other women's organizations in other countries and established an international contact network. Among its founding members where the communists Dora Freis de Barthe and Emiliana Escalada. María Freixe de Casati became its president, later succeeded by Inés Enciso Velloso.

The UFP was disbanded after the fall of the February government in 1937. This also meant the dissolution of the women's movement in Paraguay for years onward.

UFP published the women's magazine Por la Mujer de la Unión Femenina del Paraguay.
