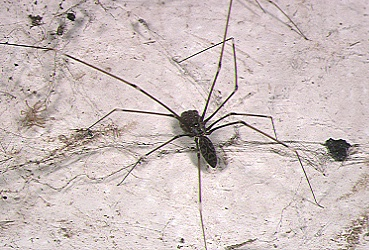
- Smeringopus pallidus

Scientific classification
- Kingdom: Animalia
- Phylum: Arthropoda
- Subphylum: Chelicerata
- Class: Arachnida
- Order: Araneae
- Infraorder: Araneomorphae
- Family: Pholcidae
- Subfamily: Holocneminae

Synonyms
- Blechroscelinae; Prisculinae

= Holocneminae =

Subfamily of spiders

Holocneminae is a subfamily of cellar spiders (family Pholcidae).

It contains the following genera:

- Artema Walckenaer, 1837
- Aymaria Huber, 2000
- Cenemus Saaristo, 2001
- Ceratopholcus Spassky, 1934
- Crossopriza Simon, 1893
- Holocnemus Simon, 1873
- Hoplopholcus Kulczynski, 1908
- Ixchela Huber, 2000
- Physocyclus Simon, 1893
- Priscula Simon, 1893
- Smeringopus Simon, 1890
- Stygopholcus Absolon & Kratochvíl, 1932
- WugigarraHuber, 2001

== See also ==
Data related to Holocneminae at Wikispecies

- List of Pholcidae species
