= Queliceria =

Scientific classification
- Kingdom: Animalia
- Phylum: Arthropoda
- Subphylum: Chelicerata
- Class: Arachnida
- Order: Araneae
- Infraorder: Araneomorphae
- Family: Pholcidae
- Genus: Queliceria; González-Sponga, 2003
- Species: Q. discrepantis

Binomial name
- Queliceria discrepantis González-Sponga, 2003

Genus of spiders

Queliceria is a monotypic genus of Venezuelan cellar spiders containing the single species, Queliceria discrepantis. It was first described by M. A. González-Sponga in 2003, and is only found in Venezuela.

== See also ==
- List of Pholcidae species
