= Canaima =

Canaima may refer to:

- Canaima National Park, Venezuela
  - Canaima Airport
- Canaima (novel), a 1935 novel by Rómulo Gallegos
- Canaima (operating system), a Debian-based Linux distribution
- Canaima (spider), a genus of cellar spiders
