= Galapa =

Galapa may refer to:

- Galapa, Colombia, town in Colombia
- Galapa (spider), genus of spiders

== See also ==
- Gallapo, town and an administrative ward in Tanzania
