= Chibchea =

Scientific classification
- Kingdom: Animalia
- Phylum: Arthropoda
- Subphylum: Chelicerata
- Class: Arachnida
- Order: Araneae
- Infraorder: Araneomorphae
- Family: Pholcidae
- Genus: Chibchea; Huber, 2000

Type species
- C. ika Huber, 2000

Species
- 21, see text

Genus of spiders

Chibchea is a genus of South American cellar spiders that was first described by B. A. Huber in 2000.

== Species ==
As of October 2020 it contains 21 species, found only in South America:

- Chibchea aberrans (Chamberlin, 1916) – Peru
- Chibchea abiseo Huber, 2000 – Peru
- Chibchea amapa Huber & Carvalho, 2019 – Brazil
- Chibchea araona Huber, 2000 – Bolivia, Chile
- Chibchea danielae Huber, 2020 – Venezuela
- Chibchea elqui Huber, 2000 – Chile
- Chibchea hamadae Huber & Carvalho, 2019 – Brazil
- Chibchea ika Huber, 2000 (type) – Colombia
- Chibchea malkini Huber, 2000 – Bolivia
- Chibchea mapuche Huber, 2000 – Chile, Juan Fernandez Is.
- Chibchea mateo Huber, 2000 – Peru
- Chibchea mayna Huber, 2000 – Ecuador, Peru
- Chibchea merida Huber, 2000 – Venezuela
- Chibchea picunche Huber, 2000 – Chile
- Chibchea salta Huber, 2000 – Argentina
- Chibchea santosi Huber & Carvalho, 2019 – Brazil
- Chibchea silvae Huber, 2000 – Peru
- Chibchea thunbergae Huber, 2020 – Venezuela
- Chibchea tunebo Huber, 2000 – Venezuela
- Chibchea uru Huber, 2000 – Peru
- Chibchea valle Huber, 2000 – Colombia

== See also ==
- List of Pholcidae species
