= Changminia =

Scientific classification
- Kingdom: Animalia
- Phylum: Arthropoda
- Subphylum: Chelicerata
- Class: Arachnida
- Order: Araneae
- Infraorder: Araneomorphae
- Family: Pholcidae
- Genus: Changminia; Yao & Li, 2022

Type species
- Holocneminus huangdi Tong & Li, 2009

Species
- 2, see text

Genus of spiders

Changminia is a genus of spiders in the family Pholcidae.

== Distribution ==
Changminia is known from Southeast Asia and southern China. The genus has been recorded from Thailand and Hainan Island in China, representing a distribution across the tropical regions of mainland Southeast Asia and nearby island territories.

== Etymology ==
The genus is named in honor of arachnologist Chang-Min Yin (尹长民; Yǐn Zhǎngmín, 1923–2009).

== Species ==
As of January 2026, this genus includes two species:

- Changminia dao Yao & Li, 2022 – Thailand
- Changminia huangdi (Tong & Li, 2009) – China (Hainan)
