= Tainonia =

Scientific classification
- Kingdom: Animalia
- Phylum: Arthropoda
- Subphylum: Chelicerata
- Class: Arachnida
- Order: Araneae
- Infraorder: Araneomorphae
- Family: Pholcidae
- Genus: Tainonia; Huber, 2000

Type species
- T. serripes (Simon, 1893)

Species
- 5, see text

Genus of spiders

Tainonia is a genus of Caribbean cellar spiders that was first described by B. A. Huber in 2000.

== Species ==
As of June 2019 it contains five species, found only on Hispaniola:

- Tainonia bayahibe Huber & Astrin, 2009 – Hispaniola
- Tainonia cienaga Huber & Astrin, 2009 – Hispaniola
- Tainonia samana Huber & Astrin, 2009 – Hispaniola
- Tainonia serripes (Simon, 1893) (type) – Hispaniola
- Tainonia visite Huber & Astrin, 2009 – Hispaniola

== See also ==
- List of Pholcidae species
