= Boconita =

Scientific classification
- Kingdom: Animalia
- Phylum: Arthropoda
- Subphylum: Chelicerata
- Class: Arachnida
- Order: Araneae
- Infraorder: Araneomorphae
- Family: Pholcidae
- Genus: Boconita; Huber, 2020

Type species
- B. sayona Huber, 2020

Species
- Boconita sayona Huber, 2020; Boconita yacambu Huber, 2020

Genus of spiders

Boconita is a small genus of South American cellar spiders. It was first described by B. A. Huber and O. Villarreal in 2020, and it has only been found in Venezuela. As of March 2022 it contains only two species: B. sayona and B. yacambu.

== See also ==
- List of Pholcidae species
