= Pinoquio =

Scientific classification
- Domain: Eukaryota
- Kingdom: Animalia
- Phylum: Arthropoda
- Subphylum: Chelicerata
- Class: Arachnida
- Order: Araneae
- Infraorder: Araneomorphae
- Family: Pholcidae
- Genus: Pinoquio
- Species: P. barauna

Binomial name
- Pinoquio barauna (Huber & Carvalho, 2019)

Synonyms
- Pinocchio Huber & Carvalho, 2019

Genus of spiders

Pinoquio is a monotypic genus of South American cellar spiders containing the single species, Pinoquio barauna. It was first described with the name Pinocchio by B. A. Huber & L. S. Carvalho in 2019, after Pinocchio, whose famous nose reminded the authors of the projecting clypeus in P. barauna. However, this name turned out to be a junior homonym that had been used before, for the harvestman genus Pinocchio Mello-Leitão, 1940 (now considered a synonym of Bresslauius Mello-Leitão, 1935). Therefore, the genus name was amended in 2022 to Pinoquio, which is the Portuguese spelling of the name of Collodi's famous character. This genus has only been found in Brazil.
