= Ninetis =

Scientific classification
- Kingdom: Animalia
- Phylum: Arthropoda
- Subphylum: Chelicerata
- Class: Arachnida
- Order: Araneae
- Infraorder: Araneomorphae
- Family: Pholcidae
- Genus: Ninetis; Simon, 1890

Type species
- N. subtilissima Simon, 1890

Species
- 6, see text

Synonyms
- Myrmidonella Berland, 1920

Genus of spiders

Ninetis is a genus of cellar spiders that was first described by Eugène Louis Simon in 1890.

== Species ==
As of June 2019 it contains six species, found only in Africa and Yemen:

- Ninetis faro Huber, 2014 – Cameroon
- Ninetis minuta (Berland, 1920) – Somalia, Kenya, Tanzania
- Ninetis namibiae Huber, 2000 – Namibia
- Ninetis russellsmithi Huber, 2002 – Malawi
- Ninetis subtilissima Simon, 1890 (type) – Yemen
- Ninetis toliara Huber & El-Hennawy, 2007 – Madagascar

== See also ==
- List of Pholcidae species
