= Ibotyporanga =

Scientific classification
- Domain: Eukaryota
- Kingdom: Animalia
- Phylum: Arthropoda
- Subphylum: Chelicerata
- Class: Arachnida
- Order: Araneae
- Infraorder: Araneomorphae
- Family: Pholcidae
- Genus: Ibotyporanga; Mello-Leitão

Species
- Ibotyporanga diroa Huber & Brescovit, 2003; Ibotyporanga emekori Huber & Brescovit, 2003; Ibotyporanga naideae Mello-Leitão, 1944; Ibotyporanga ramosae Huber & Brescovit, 2003

Genus of spiders

Ibotyporanga is a genus of spiders in the family Pholcidae. It was first described in 1944 by Mello-Leitão. As of 2017, it contains 4 species, all from Brazil.
