= Chisosa =

Scientific classification
- Kingdom: Animalia
- Phylum: Arthropoda
- Subphylum: Chelicerata
- Class: Arachnida
- Order: Araneae
- Infraorder: Araneomorphae
- Family: Pholcidae
- Genus: Chisosa; Huber, 2000

Type species
- C. diluta (Gertsch & Mulaik, 1940)

Species
- C. baja (Gertsch, 1982) – Mexico; C. caquetio Huber, 2019 – Aruba, Curaçao; C. diluta (Gertsch & Mulaik, 1940) – USA

Genus of spiders

Chisosa is a genus of cellar spiders that was first described by B. A. Huber in 2000. As of June 2019 it contains only three species, found in Aruba, the United States, Mexico, and on the Lesser Antilles: C. baja, C. caquetio, and C. diluta.

== See also ==
- List of Pholcidae species
