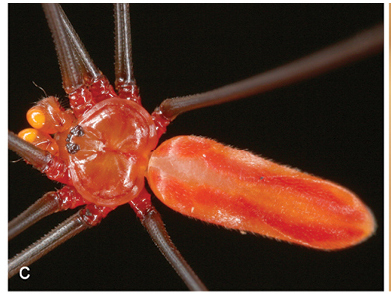
- Carapoia rubra
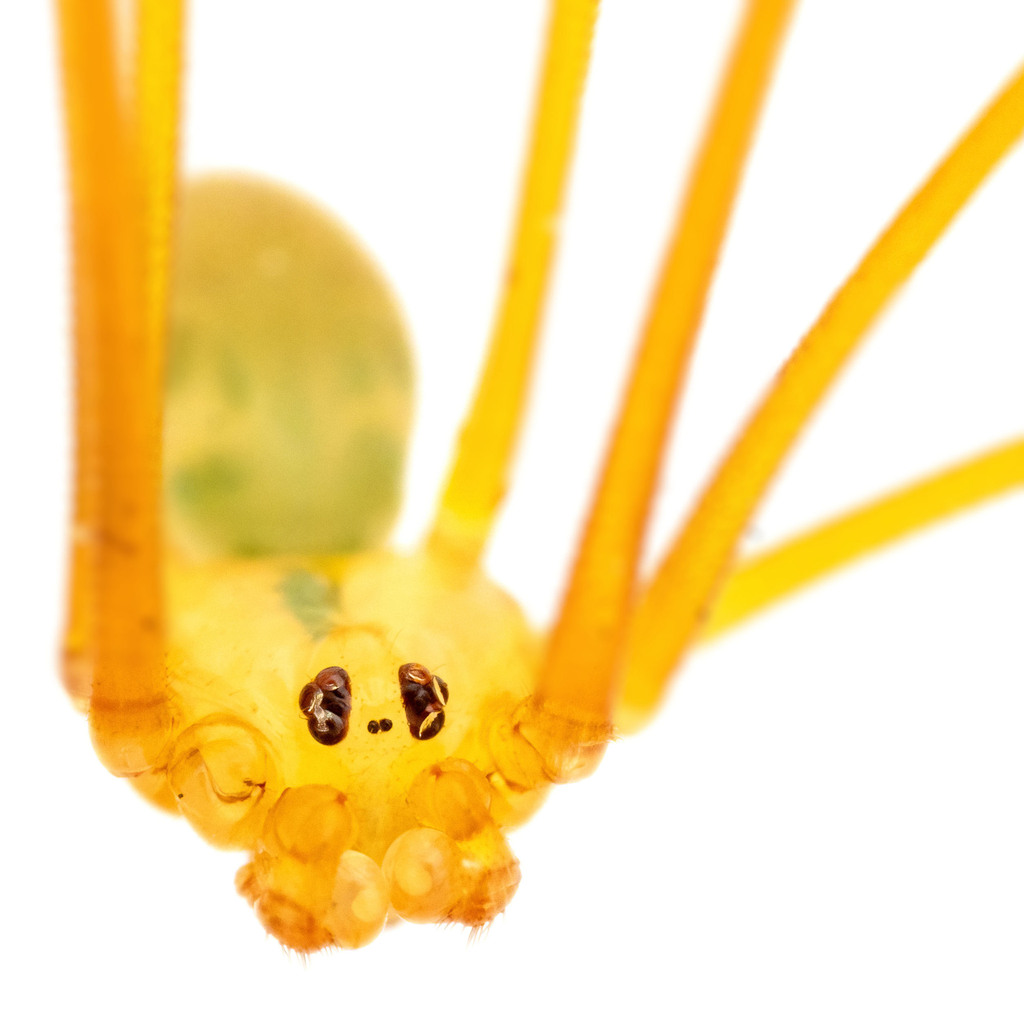
- Carapoia lutea

Scientific classification
- Kingdom: Animalia
- Phylum: Arthropoda
- Subphylum: Chelicerata
- Class: Arachnida
- Order: Araneae
- Infraorder: Araneomorphae
- Family: Pholcidae
- Genus: Carapoia; González-Sponga, 1998

Type species
- C. paraguaensis González-Sponga, 1998

Species
- 45, see text

= Carapoia =

Genus of spiders

Carapoia is a genus of South American cellar spiders that was first described by M. A. González-Sponga in 1998.

== Species ==
As of June 2019 it contains forty-five species, found in Guyana, Venezuela, Peru, Argentina, and Brazil:

- Carapoia abdita Huber, 2016 – Brazil
- Carapoia agilis Huber, 2018 – Brazil
- Carapoia alagoas Huber, 2016 – Brazil
- Carapoia bispina Huber, 2018 – Brazil
- Carapoia brescoviti Huber, 2005 – Brazil
- Carapoia cambridgei (Mello-Leitão, 1947) – Brazil
- Carapoia capixaba Huber, 2016 – Brazil
- Carapoia carvalhoi Huber, 2016 – Brazil
- Carapoia carybei Huber, 2016 – Brazil
- Carapoia crasto Huber, 2005 – Brazil
- Carapoia dandarae Huber, 2016 – Brazil
- Carapoia divisa Huber, 2016 – Brazil
- Carapoia djavani Huber, 2018 – Brazil
- Carapoia exigua Huber, 2018 – Brazil
- Carapoia fowleri Huber, 2000 – Brazil, Guyana?
- Carapoia genitalis (Moenkhaus, 1898) – Brazil
- Carapoia gracilis Huber, 2016 – Brazil
- Carapoia jiboia Huber, 2016 – Brazil
- Carapoia kaxinawa Huber, 2018 – Brazil
- Carapoia levii (Huber, 2000) – Brazil
- Carapoia lutea (Keyserling, 1891) – Brazil, Argentina
- Carapoia macacu Huber, 2016 – Brazil
- Carapoia maculata Huber, 2018 – Brazil
- Carapoia marceloi Huber, 2016 – Brazil
- Carapoia mirim Huber, 2016 – Brazil
- Carapoia munduruku Huber, 2018 – Brazil
- Carapoia nairae Huber, 2016 – Brazil
- Carapoia ocaina Huber, 2000 – Peru, Brazil
- Carapoia paraguaensis González-Sponga, 1998 (type) – Venezuela, Guyana, Brazil
- Carapoia patafina Huber, 2016 – Brazil
- Carapoia pau Huber, 2016 – Brazil
- Carapoia pulchra Huber, 2018 – Brazil
- Carapoia rheimsae Huber, 2005 – Brazil
- Carapoia rubra Huber, 2018 – Brazil
- Carapoia saltinho Huber, 2016 – Brazil
- Carapoia septentrionalis Huber, 2016 – Brazil
- Carapoia suassunai Huber, 2018 – Brazil
- Carapoia tapajos Huber, 2018 – Brazil
- Carapoia tenuis Huber, 2018 – Brazil
- Carapoia ubatuba Huber, 2005 – Brazil
- Carapoia una Huber, 2005 – Brazil
- Carapoia utinga Huber, 2018 – Brazil
- Carapoia viridis Huber, 2016 – Brazil
- Carapoia voltavelha Huber, 2016 – Brazil
- Carapoia zumbii Huber, 2016 – Brazil

== See also ==
- List of Pholcidae species
