= Otavaloa =

Scientific classification
- Kingdom: Animalia
- Phylum: Arthropoda
- Subphylum: Chelicerata
- Class: Arachnida
- Order: Araneae
- Infraorder: Araneomorphae
- Family: Pholcidae
- Genus: Otavaloa; Huber, 2000

Type species
- O. angotero Huber, 2000

Species
- 5, see text

Genus of spiders

Otavaloa is a genus of South American cellar spiders that was first described by B. A. Huber in 2000.

== Species ==
As of June 2019 it contains five species, found in Bolivia, Brazil, Peru, Ecuador, and Colombia:

- Otavaloa angotero Huber, 2000 (type) – Colombia, Ecuador, Peru
- Otavaloa lisei Huber, 2000 – Brazil
- Otavaloa otanabe Huber, 2000 – Peru
- Otavaloa pasco Huber, 2000 – Peru
- Otavaloa piro Huber, 2000 – Peru, Bolivia

== See also ==
- List of Pholcidae species
