= Anansus =

Scientific classification
- Kingdom: Animalia
- Phylum: Arthropoda
- Subphylum: Chelicerata
- Class: Arachnida
- Order: Araneae
- Infraorder: Araneomorphae
- Family: Pholcidae
- Genus: Anansus; Huber, 2007

Type species
- A. aowin Huber, 2007

Species
- 5, see text

Genus of spiders

Anansus is a genus of African cellar spiders that was first described by B. A. Huber in 2007.

== Species ==
As of June 2019 it contains five species, found only in Africa:

- Anansus aowin Huber, 2007 (type) – Ivory Coast
- Anansus atewa Huber & Kwapong, 2013 – Ghana
- Anansus debakkeri Huber, 2007 – Congo
- Anansus ewe Huber, 2007 – West Africa
- Anansus kamwai Huber, 2014 – Cameroon

== See also ==
- List of Pholcidae species
