= Pisaboa =

Scientific classification
- Kingdom: Animalia
- Phylum: Arthropoda
- Subphylum: Chelicerata
- Class: Arachnida
- Order: Araneae
- Infraorder: Araneomorphae
- Family: Pholcidae
- Genus: Pisaboa; Huber, 2000

Type species
- P. silvae Huber, 2000

Species
- 4, see text

Genus of spiders

Pisaboa is a genus of South American cellar spiders that was first described by B. A. Huber in 2000.

== Species ==
As of June 2019 it contains four species, found only in Bolivia, Venezuela, and Peru:

- Pisaboa estrecha Huber, 2000 – Peru
- Pisaboa laldea Huber, 2000 – Venezuela
- Pisaboa mapiri Huber, 2000 – Bolivia
- Pisaboa silvae Huber, 2000 (type) – Peru

== See also ==
- List of Pholcidae species
