= Ossinissa =

Scientific classification
- Kingdom: Animalia
- Phylum: Arthropoda
- Subphylum: Chelicerata
- Class: Arachnida
- Order: Araneae
- Infraorder: Araneomorphae
- Family: Pholcidae
- Genus: Ossinissa; Dimitrov & Ribera, 2005
- Species: O. justoi

Binomial name
- Ossinissa justoi (Wunderlich, 1992)

Genus of spiders

Ossinissa is a monotypic genus of cellar spiders containing the single species, Ossinissa justoi. It was first described by D. Dimitrov & C. Ribera in 2005, and is only found on the Canary Islands.

== See also ==
- List of Pholcidae species
