= Arenita =

Scientific classification
- Kingdom: Animalia
- Phylum: Arthropoda
- Subphylum: Chelicerata
- Class: Arachnida
- Order: Araneae
- Infraorder: Araneomorphae
- Family: Pholcidae
- Genus: Arenita; Huber & Carvalho, 2019
- Species: A. fazendinha

Binomial name
- Arenita fazendinha Huber & Carvalho, 2019

Genus of spiders

Arenita is a monotypic genus of South American cellar spiders containing the single species, Arenita fazendinha. It was first described by B. A. Huber and L. S. Carvalho in 2019, and it has only been found in Brazil.

== See also ==
- List of Pholcidae species
