= Maghreba =

Scientific classification
- Kingdom: Animalia
- Phylum: Arthropoda
- Subphylum: Chelicerata
- Class: Arachnida
- Order: Araneae
- Infraorder: Araneomorphae
- Family: Pholcidae
- Genus: Maghreba; Huber, 2022

Type species
- M. amezyan Huber, 2022

Species
- 8, see text

Genus of spiders

Maghreba is a genus of spiders in the family Pholcidae.

== Distribution ==
Maghreba is endemic to the Maghreb region of North Africa.

== Etymology ==
The genus is named after the Maghreb.

== Species ==
As of January 2026, this genus includes eight species:

- Maghreba amezyan Huber, 2022 – Morocco
- Maghreba aurouxi (Barrientos, 2019) – Morocco
- Maghreba djabalija Huber, 2022 – Morocco
- Maghreba gharbija Huber, 2022 – Morocco
- Maghreba kahfa Huber, 2022 – Morocco
- Maghreba nkob Huber, 2022 – Morocco, Algeria
- Maghreba saghro Huber, 2022 – Morocco
- Maghreba stifadma Huber, 2022 – Morocco
