= Kairona =

Scientific classification
- Kingdom: Animalia
- Phylum: Arthropoda
- Subphylum: Chelicerata
- Class: Arachnida
- Order: Araneae
- Infraorder: Araneomorphae
- Family: Pholcidae
- Genus: Kairona; Huber & Carvalho, 2019
- Species: K. selva

Binomial name
- Kairona selva Huber & Carvalho, 2019

Genus of spiders

Kairona is a monotypic genus of South American cellar spiders containing the single species, Kairona selva. It was first described by B. A. Huber and L. S. Carvalho in 2019, and it has only been found in Brazil.

== See also ==
- List of Pholcidae species
