= Tolteca =

Scientific classification
- Kingdom: Animalia
- Phylum: Arthropoda
- Subphylum: Chelicerata
- Class: Arachnida
- Order: Araneae
- Infraorder: Araneomorphae
- Family: Pholcidae
- Genus: Tolteca; Huber, 2000

Type species
- T. hesperia (Gertsch, 1982)

Species
- 6, see text

Genus of spiders

Tolteca is a genus of Mexican cellar spiders that was first described by B. A. Huber in 2000.

== Species ==
As of July 2023 it contains six species, found in Mexico:

- Tolteca hesperia (Gertsch, 1982) (type) – Mexico
- Tolteca huahua Huber, 2023 – Mexico
- Tolteca jalisco (Gertsch, 1982) – Mexico
- Tolteca manzanillo Huber, 2023 – Mexico
- Tolteca oaxaca Huber, 2023 – Mexico
- Tolteca sinnombre Huber, 2023 – Mexico

== See also ==
- List of Pholcidae species
