= Anopsicus =

Scientific classification
- Kingdom: Animalia
- Phylum: Arthropoda
- Subphylum: Chelicerata
- Class: Arachnida
- Order: Araneae
- Infraorder: Araneomorphae
- Family: Pholcidae
- Genus: Anopsicus; Chamberlin & Ivie, 1938

Type species
- A. pearsei Chamberlin & Ivie, 1938

Species
- 64, see text

Synonyms
- Ninetella Bryant, 1940; Pholcophorina Gertsch, 1939

Genus of spiders

Anopsicus is a genus of cellar spiders that was first described by Ralph Vary Chamberlin & Vaine Wilton Ivie in 1938.

== Species ==
As of June 2019 it contains sixty-four species, found in Central America, Cuba, Jamaica, and Mexico, with the exception of the "probably misplaced" A. banksi from the Galápagos Islands.:

- A. alteriae Gertsch, 1982 – Mexico
- A. banksi (Gertsch, 1939) – Ecuador (Galapagos Is.)
- A. beatus Gertsch, 1982 – Mexico
- A. bispinosus (Gertsch, 1971) – Mexico
- A. bolivari (Gertsch, 1971) – Mexico
- A. boneti Gertsch, 1982 – Mexico
- A. bryantae Gertsch, 1982 – Jamaica
- A. ceiba Gertsch, 1982 – Honduras
- A. chiapa Gertsch, 1982 – Mexico
- A. chickeringi Gertsch, 1982 – Panama
- A. chiriqui Gertsch, 1982 – Costa Rica, Panama
- A. clarus Gertsch, 1982 – Jamaica
- A. concinnus Gertsch, 1982 – Costa Rica
- A. covadonga Gertsch, 1982 – Mexico
- A. cubanus Gertsch, 1982 – Cuba
- A. davisi (Gertsch, 1939) – Mexico
- A. debora (Gertsch, 1977) – Mexico
- A. definitus Gertsch, 1982 – Honduras
- A. elliotti (Gertsch, 1971) – Mexico
- A. evansi (Gertsch, 1971) – Mexico
- A. exiguus (Gertsch, 1971) – Mexico
- A. facetus Gertsch, 1982 – Costa Rica
- A. grubbsi Gertsch, 1982 – Mexico
- A. gruta (Gertsch, 1971) – Mexico
- A. hanakash (Brignoli, 1974) – Guatemala
- A. iviei Gertsch, 1982 – Mexico
- A. jarmila Gertsch, 1982 – Jamaica
- A. jeanae (Gertsch, 1977) – Mexico
- A. joyoa Gertsch, 1982 – Honduras
- A. lewisi Gertsch, 1982 – Jamaica
- A. limpidus Gertsch, 1982 – Jamaica
- A. lucidus Gertsch, 1982 – Mexico
- A. malkini Gertsch, 1982 – Mexico
- A. mckenziei Gertsch, 1982 – Mexico
- A. mirabilis Gertsch, 1982 – Mexico
- A. mitchelli (Gertsch, 1971) – Mexico
- A. modicus Gertsch, 1982 – Mexico
- A. nebulosus Gertsch, 1982 – Jamaica
- A. niveus Gertsch, 1982 – Mexico
- A. nortoni Gertsch, 1982 – Jamaica
- A. ocote Gertsch, 1982 – Mexico
- A. palenque (Gertsch, 1977) – Mexico
- A. panama Gertsch, 1982 – Panama
- Anopsicus pearsei Chamberlin & Ivie, 1938 (type) – Mexico
- A. pecki Gertsch, 1982 – Jamaica
- A. placens (O. Pickard-Cambridge, 1896) – Mexico
- A. potrero Gertsch, 1982 – Mexico
- A. puebla Gertsch, 1982 – Mexico
- A. pulcher (Bryant, 1940) – Cuba
- A. quatoculus Gertsch, 1982 – Jamaica
- A. quietus (Gertsch, 1973) – Guatemala
- A. reddelli Gertsch, 1982 – Mexico
- A. silvai Gertsch, 1982 – Cuba
- A. silvanus Gertsch, 1982 – Belize
- A. soileauae Gertsch, 1982 – Mexico
- A. speophilus (Chamberlin & Ivie, 1938) – Mexico, Guatemala
- A. tehuanus Gertsch, 1982 – Mexico
- A. tico Huber, 1998 – Costa Rica
- A. troglodyta (Gertsch, 1971) – Mexico
- A. turrialba Gertsch, 1982 – Costa Rica
- A. vinnulus Gertsch, 1982 – Mexico
- A. wileyae Gertsch, 1982 – Mexico
- A. zeteki (Gertsch, 1939) – Panama
- A. zimmermani Gertsch, 1982 – Jamaica

== See also ==
- List of Pholcidae species
