= Smeringopina =

Scientific classification
- Kingdom: Animalia
- Phylum: Arthropoda
- Subphylum: Chelicerata
- Class: Arachnida
- Order: Araneae
- Infraorder: Araneomorphae
- Family: Pholcidae
- Genus: Smeringopina; Kraus, 1957

Type species
- S. beninensis Kraus, 1957

Species
- 44, see text

Genus of spiders

Smeringopina is a genus of African cellar spiders that was first described by O. Kraus in 1957.

== Species ==
As of June 2019 it contains forty-four species, found only in Africa:

- Smeringopina africana (Thorell, 1899) – West Africa
- Smeringopina ankasa Huber, 2013 – Ghana, Ivory Coast, Liberia
- Smeringopina armata (Thorell, 1899) – Cameroon
- Smeringopina attuleh Huber, 2013 – Cameroon
- Smeringopina bamenda Huber, 2013 – Cameroon
- Smeringopina bayaka Huber, 2013 – Gabon
- Smeringopina belinga Huber, 2013 – Gabon
- Smeringopina beninensis Kraus, 1957 (type) – Benin, Nigeria
- Smeringopina bineti (Millot, 1941) – Guinea
- Smeringopina bioko Huber, 2013 – Equatorial Guinea (Bioko)
- Smeringopina bomfobiri Huber, 2013 – Ghana
- Smeringopina bwiti Huber, 2013 – Gabon
- Smeringopina camerunensis Kraus, 1957 – Cameroon
- Smeringopina chaillu Huber, 2013 – Gabon
- Smeringopina cornigera (Simon, 1907) – Cameroon
- Smeringopina djidji Huber, 2013 – Gabon
- Smeringopina ebolowa Huber, 2013 – Cameroon
- Smeringopina essotah Huber, 2013 – Cameroon
- Smeringopina etome Huber, 2013 – Cameroon
- Smeringopina fang Huber, 2013 – Gabon
- Smeringopina fon Huber, 2013 – Benin, São Tomé and Príncipe, Nigeria
- Smeringopina guineensis (Millot, 1941) – Guinea, Liberia
- Smeringopina ibadan Huber, 2013 – Nigeria
- Smeringopina iboga Huber, 2013 – Gabon
- Smeringopina kala Huber, 2013 – Cameroon, Equatorial Guinea
- Smeringopina kikongo Huber, 2013 – Congo
- Smeringopina kinguele Huber, 2013 – Gabon
- Smeringopina kribi Huber, 2013 – Cameroon
- Smeringopina lekoni Huber, 2013 – Gabon
- Smeringopina luki Huber, 2013 – Congo
- Smeringopina mayebout Huber, 2013 – Gabon
- Smeringopina mbouda Huber, 2013 – Cameroon
- Smeringopina mohoba Huber, 2013 – Gabon
- Smeringopina moudouma Huber, 2013 – Gabon
- Smeringopina ndjole Huber, 2013 – Gabon
- Smeringopina ngungu Huber, 2013 – Congo
- Smeringopina nyasoso Huber, 2013 – Cameroon
- Smeringopina ogooue Huber, 2013 – Gabon
- Smeringopina pulchra (Millot, 1941) – West Africa
- Smeringopina sahoue Huber, 2013 – Gabon
- Smeringopina simintang Huber, 2013 – Gabon
- Smeringopina simplex Kraus, 1957 – Cameroon
- Smeringopina tchimbele Huber, 2013 – Gabon
- Smeringopina tebe Huber, 2013 – Gabon

== See also ==
- List of Pholcidae species
