= Zatavua =

Scientific classification
- Kingdom: Animalia
- Phylum: Arthropoda
- Subphylum: Chelicerata
- Class: Arachnida
- Order: Araneae
- Infraorder: Araneomorphae
- Family: Pholcidae
- Genus: Zatavua; Huber, 2003

Type species
- Z. griswoldi Huber, 2003

Species
- 17, see text

Genus of spiders

Zatavua is a genus of Malagasy cellar spiders that was first described by B. A. Huber in 2003.

== Species ==
As of June 2019 it contains seventeen species, found only on Madagascar:

- Zatavua analalava Huber, 2003 – Madagascar
- Zatavua andrei (Millot, 1946) – Madagascar
- Zatavua ankaranae (Millot, 1946) – Madagascar
- Zatavua fagei (Millot, 1946) – Madagascar
- Zatavua griswoldi Huber, 2003 (type) – Madagascar
- Zatavua imerinensis (Millot, 1946) – Madagascar
- Zatavua impudica (Millot, 1946) – Madagascar
- Zatavua isalo Huber, 2003 – Madagascar
- Zatavua kely Huber, 2003 – Madagascar
- Zatavua madagascariensis (Fage, 1945) – Madagascar
- Zatavua mahafaly Huber, 2003 – Madagascar
- Zatavua punctata (Millot, 1946) – Madagascar
- Zatavua talatakely Huber, 2003 – Madagascar
- Zatavua tamatave Huber, 2003 – Madagascar
- Zatavua voahangyae Huber, 2003 – Madagascar
- Zatavua vohiparara Huber, 2003 – Madagascar
- Zatavua zanahary Huber, 2003 – Madagascar

== See also ==
- List of Pholcidae species
