= Guaranita =

Scientific classification
- Kingdom: Animalia
- Phylum: Arthropoda
- Subphylum: Chelicerata
- Class: Arachnida
- Order: Araneae
- Infraorder: Araneomorphae
- Family: Pholcidae
- Genus: Guaranita; Huber, 2000

Type species
- G. goloboffi Huber, 2000

Species
- 4, see text

Genus of spiders

Guaranita is a genus of South American cellar spiders that was first described by B. A. Huber in 2000.

== Species ==
As of June 2019 it contains four species, found only in Brazil and Argentina:

- Guaranita dobby Torres, Pardo, González-Reyes, Rodríguez Artigas & Corronca, 2016 – Argentina
- Guaranita goloboffi Huber, 2000 (type) – Argentina
- Guaranita munda (Gertsch, 1982) – Brazil, Argentina
- Guaranita yaculica Huber, 2000 – Argentina

== See also ==
- List of Pholcidae species
