= Arnapa =

Scientific classification
- Kingdom: Animalia
- Phylum: Arthropoda
- Subphylum: Chelicerata
- Class: Arachnida
- Order: Araneae
- Infraorder: Araneomorphae
- Family: Pholcidae
- Genus: Arnapa; Huber, 2019

Type species
- A. arfak Huber, 2019

Species
- 6, see text

Genus of spiders

Arnapa is a genus of cellar spiders native to Indonesia, first described by B. A. Huber and L. S. Carvalho in 2019. It is named after West Papuan musician and cultural leader Arnold Ap.

== Species ==
As of April 2022 it contains six species:

- A. arfak Huber, 2019 (type) – Indonesia (West Papua)
- A. manokwari Huber, 2019 – Indonesia (West Papua)
- A. meja Huber, 2019 – Indonesia (West Papua)
- A. nigromaculata (Kulczyński, 1911) – New Guinea
- A. tinoor Huber, 2019 – Indonesia (Sulawesi)
- A. tolire Huber, 2019 – Indonesia (Ternate, North Maluku)

== See also ==
- Psilochorus
- List of Pholcidae species
