= Paramicromerys =

Scientific classification
- Kingdom: Animalia
- Phylum: Arthropoda
- Subphylum: Chelicerata
- Class: Arachnida
- Order: Araneae
- Infraorder: Araneomorphae
- Family: Pholcidae
- Genus: Paramicromerys; Millot, 1946

Type species
- P. madagascariensis (Simon, 1893)

Species
- 14, see text

Genus of spiders

Paramicromerys is a genus of Malagasy cellar spiders that was first described by J. Millot in 1946.

== Species ==
As of June 2019 it contains fourteen species, found only on Madagascar:

- Paramicromerys betsileo Huber, 2003 – Madagascar
- Paramicromerys coddingtoni Huber, 2003 – Madagascar
- Paramicromerys combesi (Millot, 1946) – Madagascar
- Paramicromerys madagascariensis (Simon, 1893) (type) – Madagascar
- Paramicromerys mahira Huber, 2003 – Madagascar
- Paramicromerys manantenina Huber, 2003 – Madagascar
- Paramicromerys marojejy Huber, 2003 – Madagascar
- Paramicromerys megaceros (Millot, 1946) – Madagascar
- Paramicromerys nampoinai Huber, 2003 – Madagascar
- Paramicromerys quinteri Huber, 2003 – Madagascar
- Paramicromerys rabeariveloi Huber, 2003 – Madagascar
- Paramicromerys ralamboi Huber, 2003 – Madagascar
- Paramicromerys rothorum Huber, 2003 – Madagascar
- Paramicromerys scharffi Huber, 2003 – Madagascar

== See also ==
- List of Pholcidae species
