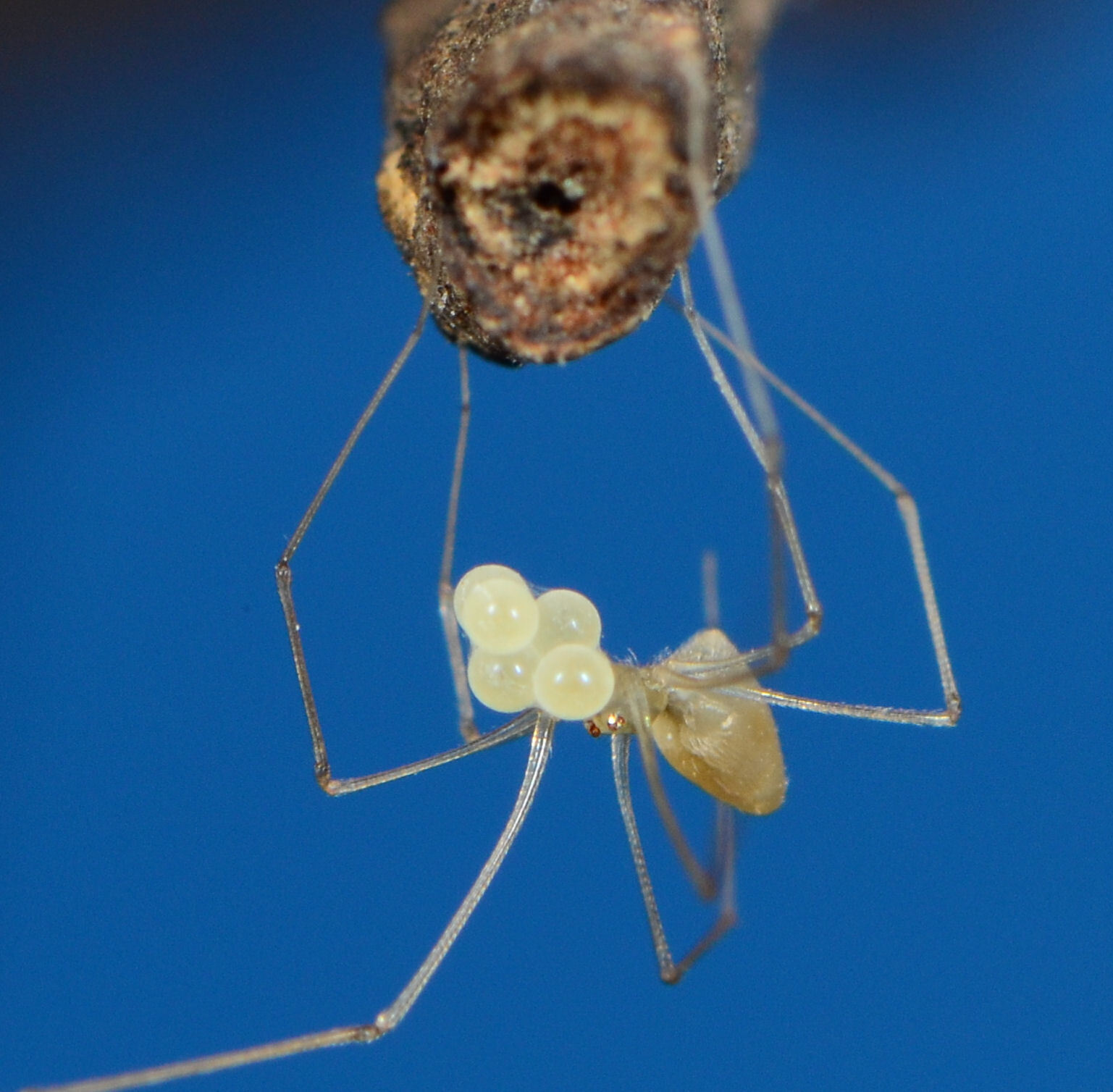
- female Q. entabeni with egg sac
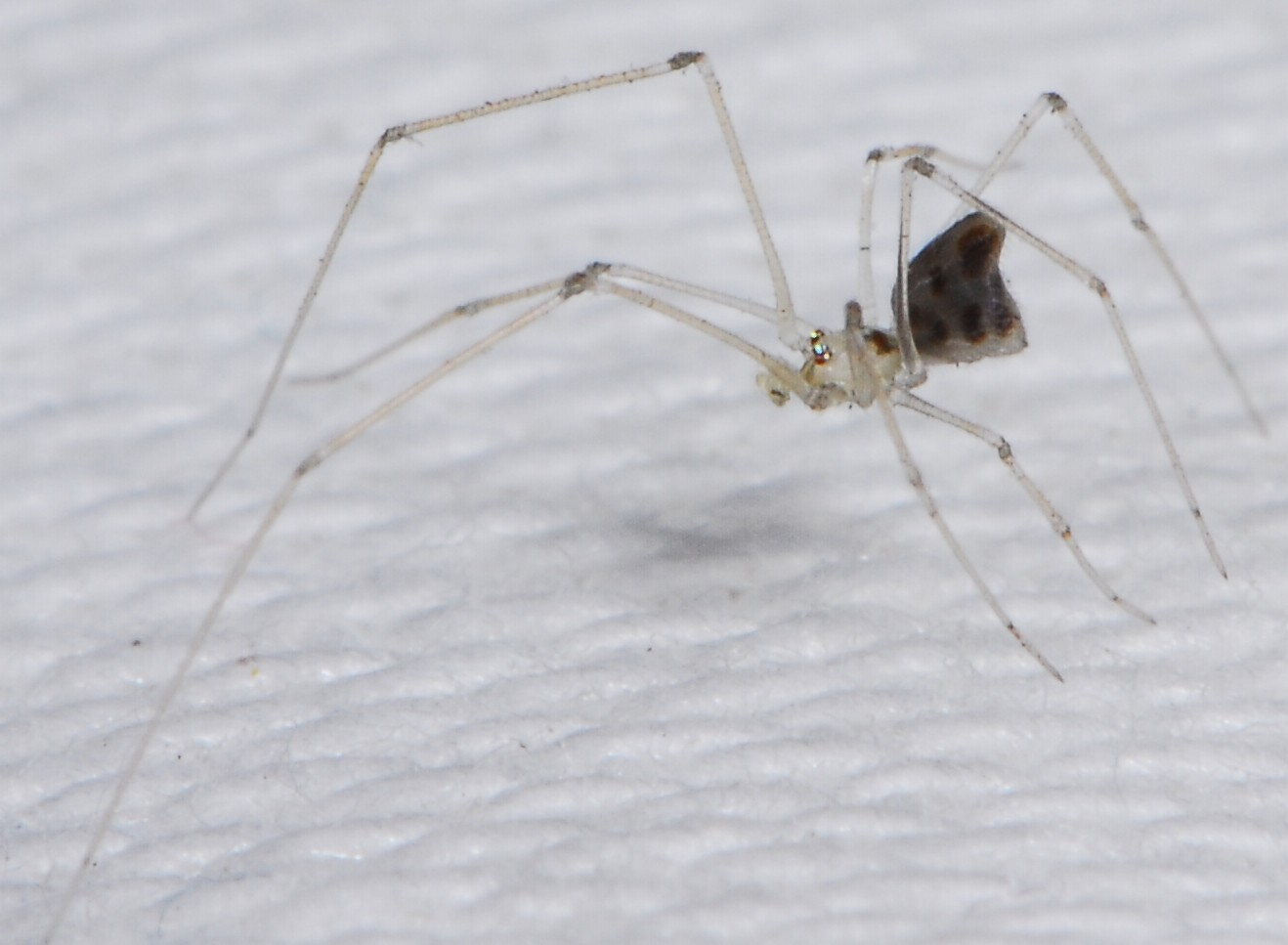
- Q. mabusai

Scientific classification
- Kingdom: Animalia
- Phylum: Arthropoda
- Subphylum: Chelicerata
- Class: Arachnida
- Order: Araneae
- Infraorder: Araneomorphae
- Family: Pholcidae
- Genus: Quamtana; Huber, 2003

Type species
- Q. merwei Huber, 2003

Species
- 26, see text

= Quamtana =

African spotted cellar spiders Temporal range: Palaeogene– Present

Genus of spiders

Quamtana is a genus of African cellar spiders known as African spotted cellar spiders, that was first described by Bernhard A. Huber in 2003.

All described species are found in Africa, with most of them endemic to South Africa.

== Species ==
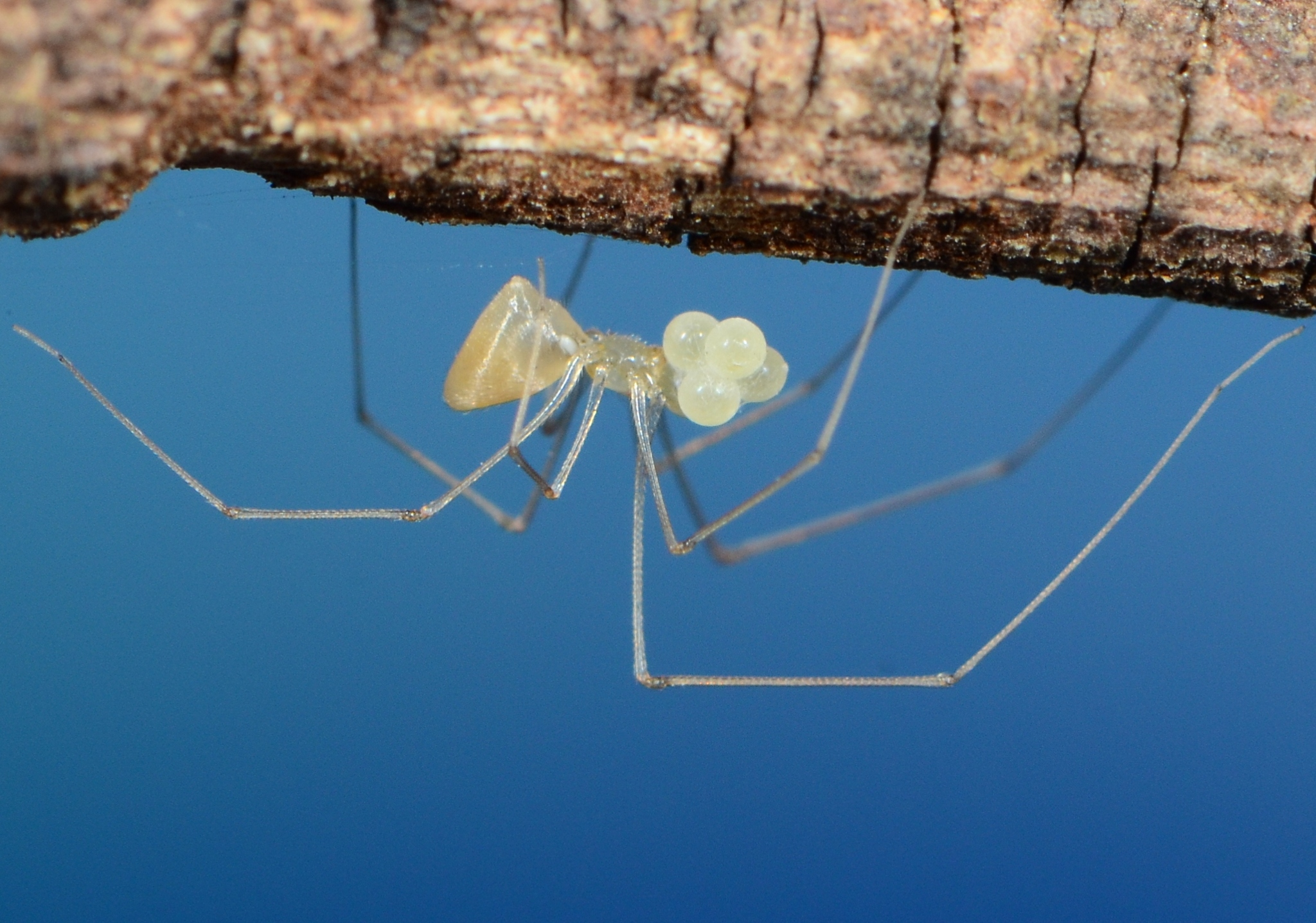
Q. entabeni

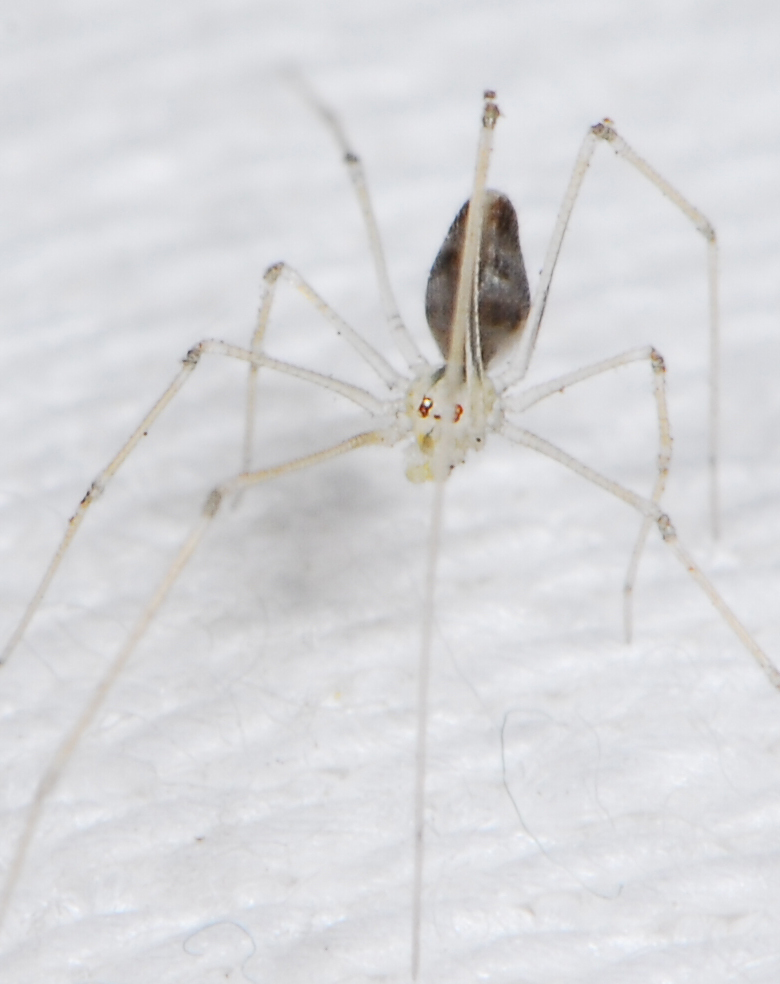
Q. mabusai

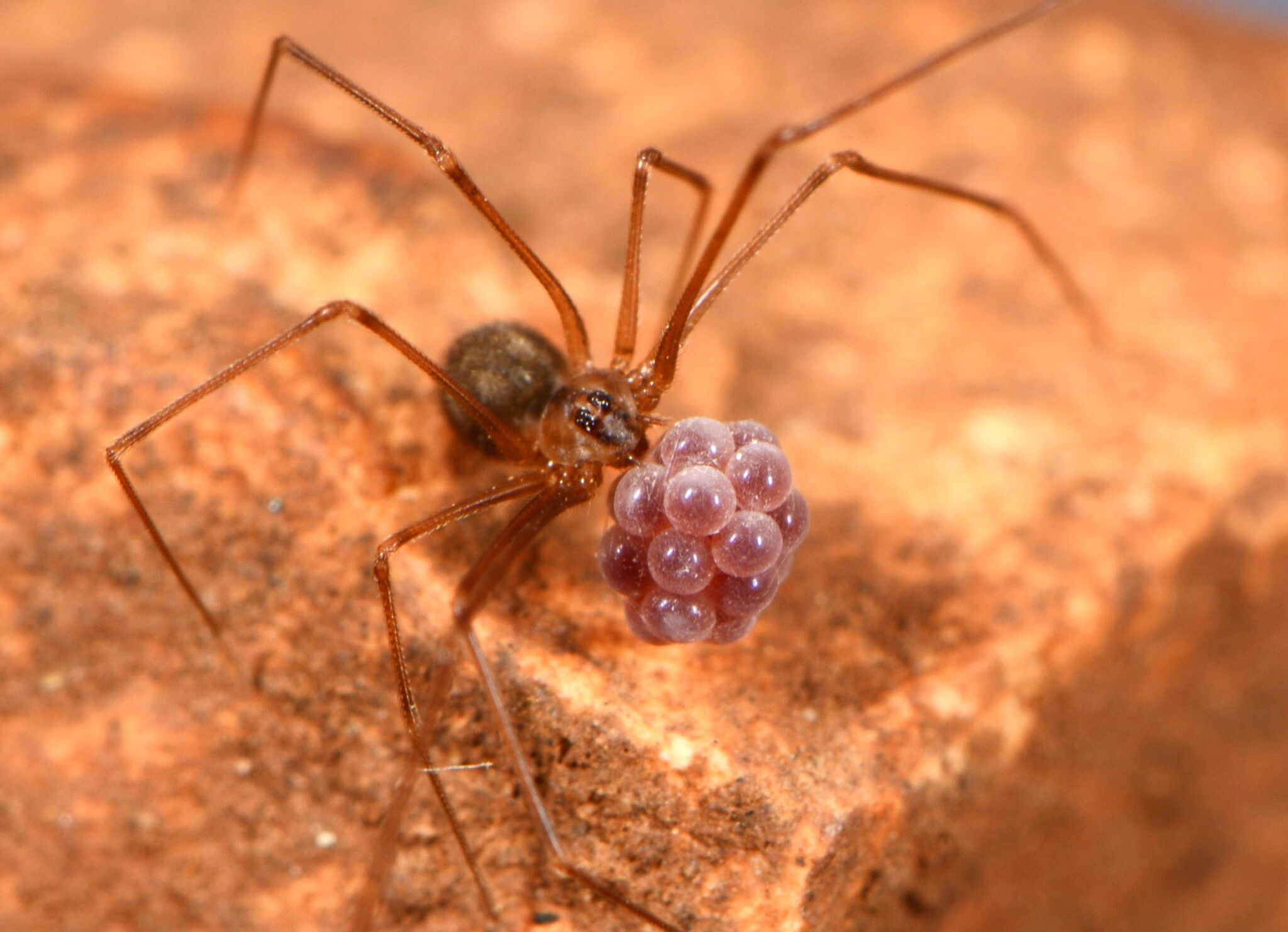
Q. hectori

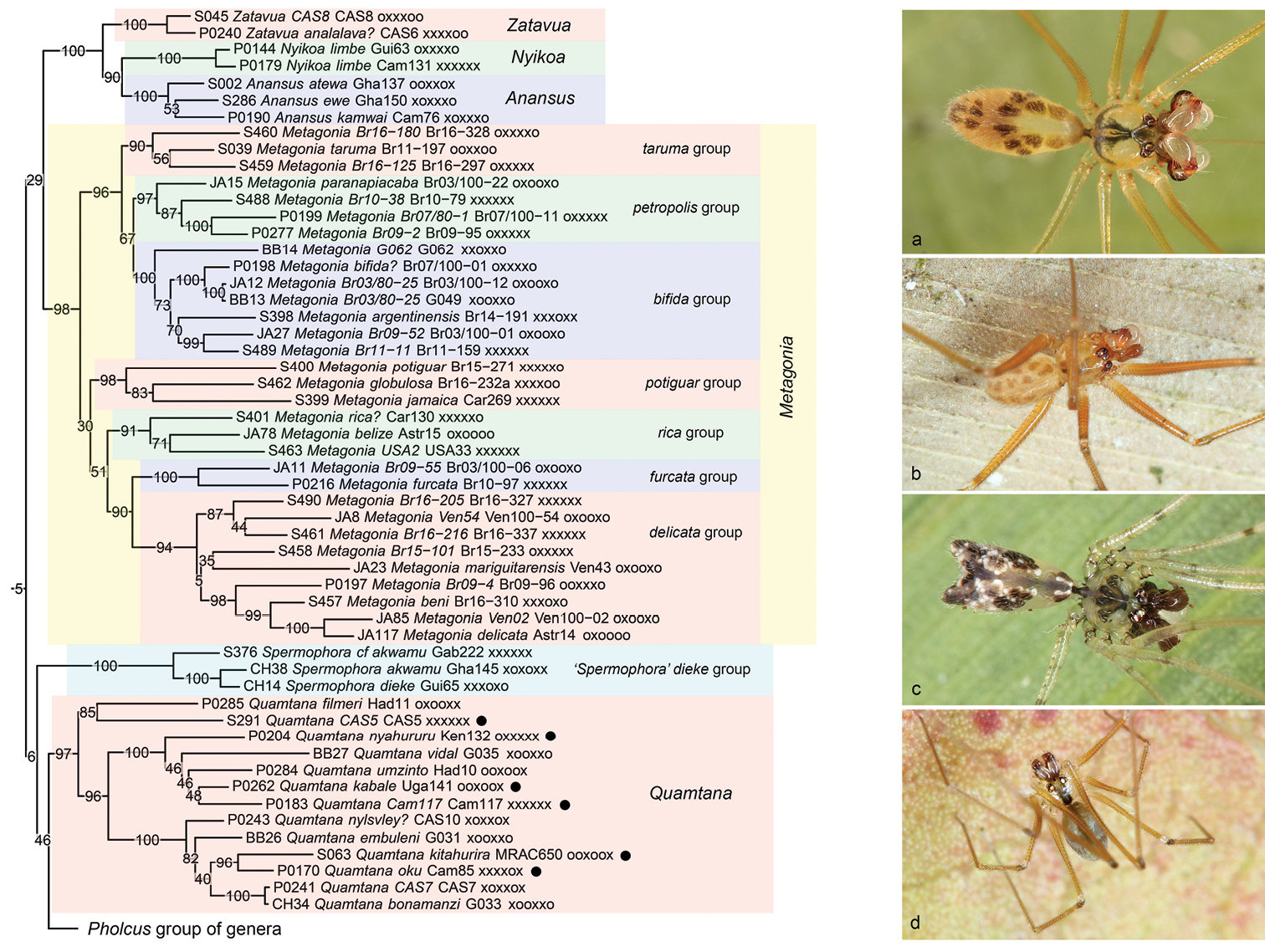
Relationship of Quamtana species

As of October 2025, this genus includes 26 species:

- Quamtana biena Huber, 2003 – Rep. Congo
- Quamtana bonamanzi Huber, 2003 – South Africa
- Quamtana ciliata (Lawrence, 1938) – South Africa
- Quamtana embuleni Huber, 2003 – South Africa
- Quamtana entabeni Huber, 2003 – South Africa
- Quamtana filmeri Huber, 2003 – South Africa, Lesotho
- Quamtana hectori Huber, 2003 – South Africa
- Quamtana kabale Huber, 2003 – Uganda
- Quamtana kitahurira Huber, 2003 – Guinea, Angola, Uganda, Burundi, DR Congo
- Quamtana knysna Huber, 2003 – South Africa
- Quamtana lajuma Huber, 2003 – South Africa
- Quamtana leleupi Huber, 2003 – South Africa
- Quamtana leptopholcica (Strand, 1909) – South Africa
- Quamtana lotzi Huber, 2003 – South Africa
- Quamtana mabusai Huber, 2003 – South Africa, Eswatini
- Quamtana mbaba Huber, 2003 – South Africa
- Quamtana merwei Huber, 2003 – South Africa (type species)
- Quamtana meyeri Huber, 2003 – South Africa
- Quamtana molimo Huber, 2003 – Lesotho
- Quamtana nandi Huber, 2003 – South Africa
- Quamtana nyahururu Huber & Warui, 2012 – Kenya, Tanzania
- Quamtana nylsvley Huber, 2003 – South Africa
- Quamtana oku Huber, 2003 – Cameroon
- Quamtana tsui Huber, 2003 – South Africa
- Quamtana umzinto Huber, 2003 – South Africa
- Quamtana vidal Huber, 2003 – South Africa

== See also ==
- List of Pholcidae species
