= Tupigea =

Scientific classification
- Kingdom: Animalia
- Phylum: Arthropoda
- Subphylum: Chelicerata
- Class: Arachnida
- Order: Araneae
- Infraorder: Araneomorphae
- Family: Pholcidae
- Genus: Tupigea; Huber, 2000

Type species
- T. lisei Huber, 2000

Species
- 12, see text

Genus of spiders

Tupigea is a genus of Brazilian cellar spiders that was first described by B. A. Huber in 2000.

== Species ==
As of June 2019 it contains twelve species, found only in Brazil:

- Tupigea ale Huber, 2011 – Brazil
- Tupigea altiventer (Keyserling, 1891) – Brazil
- Tupigea angelim Huber, 2011 – Brazil
- Tupigea cantareira Machado, Yamamoto, Brescovit & Huber, 2007 – Brazil
- Tupigea guapia Huber, 2011 – Brazil
- Tupigea lisei Huber, 2000 (type) – Brazil
- Tupigea maza Huber, 2000 – Brazil
- Tupigea nadleri Huber, 2000 – Brazil
- Tupigea paula Huber, 2000 – Brazil
- Tupigea penedo Huber, 2011 – Brazil
- Tupigea sicki Huber, 2000 – Brazil
- Tupigea teresopolis Huber, 2000 – Brazil

== See also ==
- List of Pholcidae species
