= Systenita =

Scientific classification
- Kingdom: Animalia
- Phylum: Arthropoda
- Subphylum: Chelicerata
- Class: Arachnida
- Order: Araneae
- Infraorder: Araneomorphae
- Family: Pholcidae
- Genus: Systenita; Simon, 1893
- Species: S. prasina

Binomial name
- Systenita prasina Simon, 1893

Genus of spiders

Systenita is a monotypic genus of Venezuelan cellar spiders containing the single species, Systenita prasina. It was first described by Eugène Louis Simon in 1893, and is only found in Venezuela.

== See also ==
- List of Pholcidae species
