= Saciperere =

Scientific classification
- Kingdom: Animalia
- Phylum: Arthropoda
- Subphylum: Chelicerata
- Class: Arachnida
- Order: Araneae
- Infraorder: Araneomorphae
- Family: Pholcidae
- Genus: Saciperere; Huber & Carvalho, 2019
- Species: S. catuaba

Binomial name
- Saciperere catuaba Huber & Carvalho, 2019

Genus of spiders

Saciperere is a monotypic genus of South American cellar spiders containing the single species, Saciperere catuaba. It was first described by B. A. Huber and L. S. Carvalho in 2019, and it has only been found in Brazil.

== See also ==
- List of Pholcidae species
