= Tangguoa =

Scientific classification
- Kingdom: Animalia
- Phylum: Arthropoda
- Subphylum: Chelicerata
- Class: Arachnida
- Order: Araneae
- Infraorder: Araneomorphae
- Family: Pholcidae
- Genus: Tangguoa; Yao & Li, 2021

Type species
- T. laibin Yao & Li, 2021

Species
- Tangguoa laibin Yao & Li, 2021; Tangguoa tongguling Yao & Li, 2021

Genus of spiders

Tangguoa is a small genus of east Asian cellar spiders. It was first described by Z. Y. Yao, Y. P. Luo and S. Q. Li in 2021, and it has only been found in China. As of March 2022 it contains only two species: T. laibin and T. tongguling.

== See also ==
- List of Pholcidae species
