= Kelabita =

Scientific classification
- Kingdom: Animalia
- Phylum: Arthropoda
- Subphylum: Chelicerata
- Class: Arachnida
- Order: Araneae
- Infraorder: Araneomorphae
- Family: Pholcidae
- Genus: Kelabita; Huber, 2018

Type species
- Pholcus andulau (Huber, 2011)

Species
- Kelabita andulau (Huber, 2011); Kelabita lambir (Huber, 2016)

Genus of spiders

Kelabita is a small genus of southeast Asian cellar spiders. The genus was erected in 2018 for two species transferred from Pholcus after a molecular phylogenetic study of Pholcidae. It is named after the Kelabit, an ethnic group native to Borneo. They build domed webs up to 2 metres (6 ft 7 in) above the ground, and can be distinguished by unique sclerotization, including a partially sclerotized embolus. As of April 2022 it contains only two species: K. andulau and K. lambir.

== See also ==
- Pholcus
- List of Pholcidae species
