= Tibetia =

Scientific classification
- Kingdom: Animalia
- Phylum: Arthropoda
- Subphylum: Chelicerata
- Class: Arachnida
- Order: Araneae
- Infraorder: Araneomorphae
- Family: Pholcidae
- Genus: Tibetia; Zhang, Zhu & Song, 2006
- Species: T. everesti

Binomial name
- Tibetia everesti (Hu & Li, 1987)

Genus of spiders

Tibetia is a monotypic genus of cellar spiders containing the single species, Tibetia everesti. It was first described by F. Zhang, M. S. Zhu and D. X. Song in 2006, and is only found in Tibet.

== See also ==
- List of Pholcidae species
