= Waunana =

Scientific classification
- Kingdom: Animalia
- Phylum: Arthropoda
- Subphylum: Chelicerata
- Class: Arachnida
- Order: Araneae
- Infraorder: Araneomorphae
- Family: Pholcidae
- Genus: Waunana; Huber, 2000

Type species
- W. modesta (Banks, 1929)

Species
- 4, see text

Genus of spiders

Waunana is a genus of cellar spiders that was first described by B. A. Huber in 2000.

== Species ==
As of June 2019 it contains four species, found only in Ecuador, Colombia, and Panama:

- Waunana anchicaya Huber, 2000 – Colombia, Ecuador
- Waunana eberhardi Huber, 2000 – Colombia
- Waunana modesta (Banks, 1929) (type) – Panama
- Waunana tulcan Huber, 2000 – Ecuador

== See also ==
- List of Pholcidae species
