= Aucana =

Scientific classification
- Kingdom: Animalia
- Phylum: Arthropoda
- Subphylum: Chelicerata
- Class: Arachnida
- Order: Araneae
- Infraorder: Araneomorphae
- Family: Pholcidae
- Genus: Aucana; Huber, 2000

Type species
- A. platnicki Huber, 2000

Species
- 5, see text

Genus of spiders

Aucana is a genus of cellar spiders that was first described by B. A. Huber in 2000.

== Species ==
As of June 2019 it contains five species, found only in Chile and on New Caledonia:

- Aucana kaala Huber, 2000 – New Caledonia
- Aucana paposo Huber, 2000 – Chile
- Aucana petorca Huber, 2000 – Chile
- Aucana platnicki Huber, 2000 (type) – Chile
- Aucana ramirezi Huber, 2000 – Chile

== See also ==
- List of Pholcidae species
