= Coryssocnemis =

Coryssocnemis Temporal range: Neogene– Present

Scientific classification
- Kingdom: Animalia
- Phylum: Arthropoda
- Subphylum: Chelicerata
- Class: Arachnida
- Order: Araneae
- Infraorder: Araneomorphae
- Family: Pholcidae
- Genus: Coryssocnemis; Simon, 1893

Type species
- C. callaica Simon, 1893

Species
- 14, see text

Genus of spiders

Coryssocnemis is a genus of cellar spiders that was first described by Eugène Louis Simon in 1893.

== Species ==
As of June 2019 it contains fourteen species, found in Central America, Brazil, Venezuela, Mexico, and on Trinidad:

- Coryssocnemis aripo Huber, 2000 – Trinidad
- Coryssocnemis callaica Simon, 1893 (type) – Venezuela
- Coryssocnemis clara Gertsch, 1971 – Mexico
- Coryssocnemis discolor Mello-Leitão, 1918 – Brazil
- Coryssocnemis faceta Gertsch, 1971 – Mexico
- Coryssocnemis guatopo Huber, 2000 – Venezuela
- Coryssocnemis iviei Gertsch, 1971 – Mexico
- Coryssocnemis lepidoptera Mello-Leitão, 1918 – Brazil
- Coryssocnemis monagas Huber, 2000 – Venezuela
- Coryssocnemis occulta Mello-Leitão, 1918 – Brazil
- Coryssocnemis simla Huber, 2000 – Trinidad
- Coryssocnemis tarsocurvipes (González-Sponga, 2003) – Venezuela
- Coryssocnemis tigra Huber, 1998 – Honduras
- Coryssocnemis viridescens Kraus, 1955 – El Salvador to Costa Rica

== See also ==
- List of Pholcidae species
