= Blancoa (spider) =

Scientific classification
- Kingdom: Animalia
- Phylum: Arthropoda
- Subphylum: Chelicerata
- Class: Arachnida
- Order: Araneae
- Infraorder: Araneomorphae
- Family: Pholcidae
- Genus: Blancoa; Huber, 2000

Type species
- Blancoa piacoa

Species
- Blancoa piacoa; Blancoa guacharo

Genus of spiders

Blancoa is a genus of spiders in the family Pholcidae.

== Taxonomy ==
The genus was first described in 2000. It contains two species:

- B. guacharo
- B. piacoa (type)
