= Enetea =

Scientific classification
- Kingdom: Animalia
- Phylum: Arthropoda
- Subphylum: Chelicerata
- Class: Arachnida
- Order: Araneae
- Infraorder: Araneomorphae
- Family: Pholcidae
- Genus: Enetea; Huber, 2000
- Species: E. apatellata

Binomial name
- Enetea apatellata Huber, 2000

Genus of spiders

Enetea is a monotypic genus of Bolivian cellar spiders containing the single species, Enetea apatellata. It was first described by B. A. Huber in 2000, and is only found in Bolivia.

== See also ==
- List of Pholcidae species
