= Kambiwa =

Scientific classification
- Kingdom: Animalia
- Phylum: Arthropoda
- Subphylum: Chelicerata
- Class: Arachnida
- Order: Araneae
- Infraorder: Araneomorphae
- Family: Pholcidae
- Genus: Kambiwa; Huber, 2000

Type species
- K. neotropica (Kraus, 1957)

Species
- 8 (see text)

Genus of spiders

Kambiwa is a genus of cellar spiders that are native only to Brazil.

== Taxonomy ==
This genus was first described by B. A. Huber in 2000 with Kambiwa neotropica being the type species. As of June 2019 the genus contains eight described species. They are listed below:

1. K. anomala Mello-Leitão, 1918
2. K. brumado Huber et al. 2026
3. K. coribe Huber et al. 2026
4. K. ibo Huber et al. 2026
5. K. itacarambi Huber et al. 2026
6. K. maracas Huber et al. 2026
7. K. neotropica Kraus, 1957 (type species)
8. K. sapo Huber et al. 2026

== See also ==
- List of Pholcidae species
