= Magana =

Scientific classification
- Kingdom: Animalia
- Phylum: Arthropoda
- Subphylum: Chelicerata
- Class: Arachnida
- Order: Araneae
- Infraorder: Araneomorphae
- Family: Pholcidae
- Genus: Magana; Huber, 2019
- Species: M. velox

Binomial name
- Magana velox Huber, 2019

Genus of spiders

Magana is a monotypic genus of Arabian cellar spiders containing the single species, Magana velox. It was first described by B. A. Huber and L. S. Carvalho in 2019, and it has only been found in Oman.

== See also ==
- List of Pholcidae species
