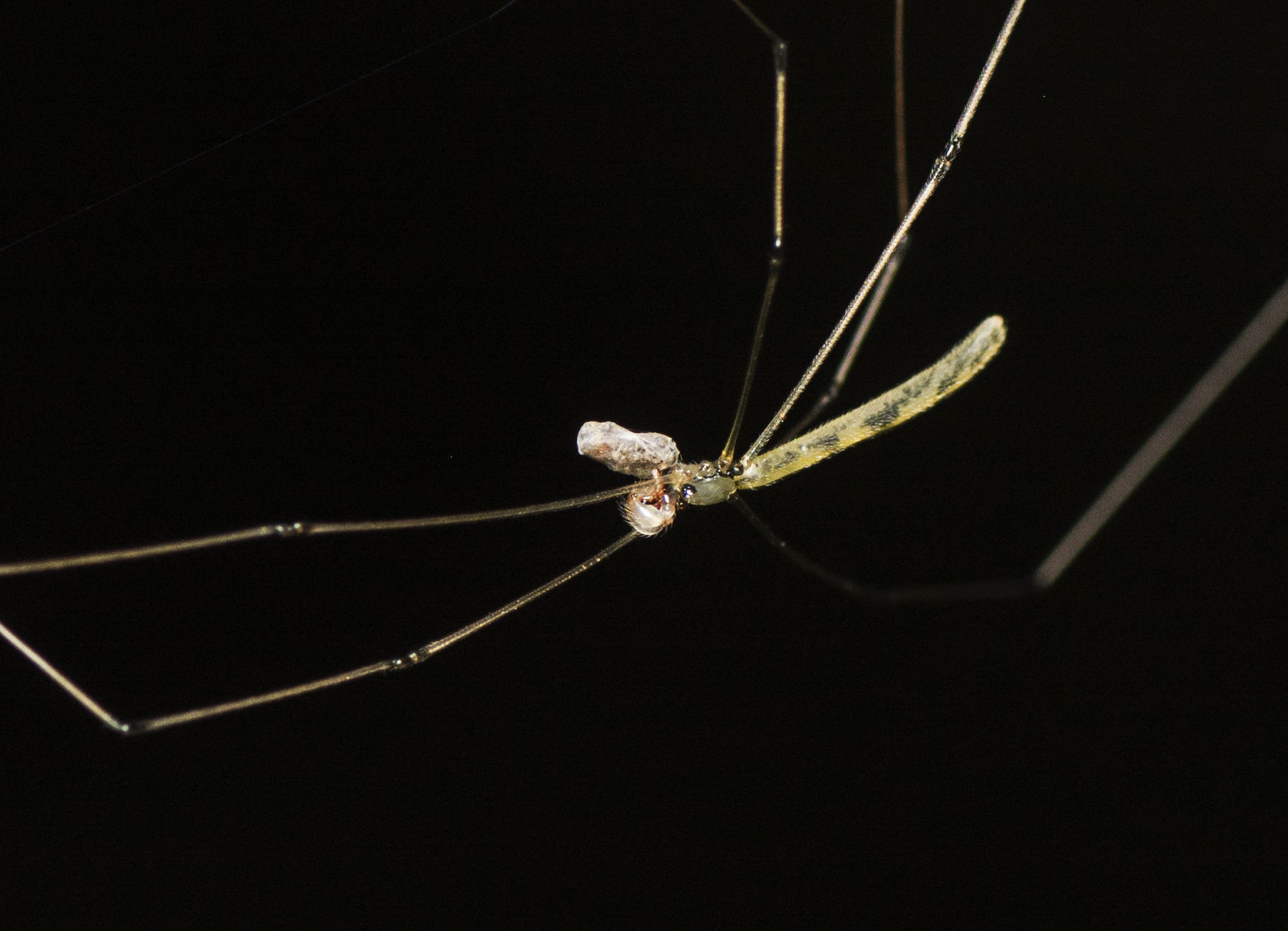

Scientific classification
- Kingdom: Animalia
- Phylum: Arthropoda
- Subphylum: Chelicerata
- Class: Arachnida
- Order: Araneae
- Infraorder: Araneomorphae
- Family: Pholcidae
- Genus: Micromerys; Bradley, 1877

Type species
- M. gracilis Bradley, 1877

Species
- 9, see text

= Micromerys =

Genus of spiders

Micromerys is a genus of South Pacific cellar spiders that was first described by H. B. Bradley in 1877.

== Species ==
As of June 2019 it contains nine species, found only in Australia and Papua New Guinea:

- Micromerys baiteta Huber, 2011 – New Guinea
- Micromerys daviesae Deeleman-Reinhold, 1986 – Australia (Queensland)
- Micromerys gidil Huber, 2001 – Australia (Queensland)
- Micromerys gracilis Bradley, 1877 (type) – Australia (Northern Territory, Queensland)
- Micromerys gurran Huber, 2001 – Australia (Queensland)
- Micromerys papua Huber, 2011 – New Guinea
- Micromerys raveni Huber, 2001 – Australia (Queensland, New South Wales)
- Micromerys wigi Huber, 2001 – Australia (Queensland)
- Micromerys yidin Huber, 2001 – Australia (Queensland)

== See also ==
- List of Pholcidae species
