= Pholcitrichocyclus =

Scientific classification
- Kingdom: Animalia
- Phylum: Arthropoda
- Subphylum: Chelicerata
- Class: Arachnida
- Order: Araneae
- Infraorder: Araneomorphae
- Family: Pholcidae
- Genus: Pholcitrichocyclus; Ceccolini & Cianferoni, 2022

Type species
- P. nigropunctatus (Simon, 1908)

Species
- 23, see text

Genus of spiders

Pholcitrichocyclus is a genus of Australian cellar spiders that was first described by Ceccolini & Cianferoni, in 2022.

== Species ==
As of March 2022 it contains twenty-three species, found in Queensland, South Australia, the Northern Territory, and Western Australia:

- Pholcitrichocyclus arabana (Huber, 2001) – Australia (Western Australia, Northern Territory, South Australia)
- Pholcitrichocyclus aranda (Huber, 2001) – Australia (Western Australia, Northern Territory)
- Pholcitrichocyclus arawari (Huber, 2001) – Australia (Western Australia)
- Pholcitrichocyclus arnga (Huber, 2001) – Australia (Western Australia)
- Pholcitrichocyclus balladong (Huber, 2001) – Australia (Western Australia)
- Pholcitrichocyclus bugai (Huber, 2001) – Australia (Western Australia)
- Pholcitrichocyclus djauan (Huber, 2001) – Australia (Northern Territory)
- Pholcitrichocyclus gnalooma (Huber, 2001) – Australia (Western Australia)
- Pholcitrichocyclus grayi (Huber, 2001) – Australia (Northern Territory)
- Pholcitrichocyclus harveyi (Huber, 2001) – Australia (Western Australia)
- Pholcitrichocyclus hirsti (Huber, 2001) – Australia (South Australia)
- Pholcitrichocyclus kokata (Huber, 2001) – Australia (South Australia)
- Pholcitrichocyclus kurara (Huber, 2001) – Australia (Western Australia)
- Pholcitrichocyclus nigropunctatus (Simon, 1908) (type) – Australia (Western Australia)
- Pholcitrichocyclus nullarbor (Huber, 2001) – Australia (Western Australia, South Australia)
- Pholcitrichocyclus oborindi (Huber, 2001) – Australia (Queensland)
- Pholcitrichocyclus pandima (Huber, 2001) – Australia (Western Australia)
- Pholcitrichocyclus pustulatus (Deeleman-Reinhold), 1995 – Australia (Queensland)
- Pholcitrichocyclus septentrionalis (Deeleman-Reinhold, 1993) – Australia (Western Australia)
- Pholcitrichocyclus ungumi (Huber, 2001) – Australia (Western Australia)
- Pholcitrichocyclus warianga (Huber, 2001) – Australia (Western Australia)
- Pholcitrichocyclus watta (Huber, 2001) – Australia (Northern Territory)
- Pholcitrichocyclus worora (Huber, 2001) – Australia (Western Australia)

== See also ==
- List of Pholcidae species
