= Pomboa =

Scientific classification
- Kingdom: Animalia
- Phylum: Arthropoda
- Subphylum: Chelicerata
- Class: Arachnida
- Order: Araneae
- Infraorder: Araneomorphae
- Family: Pholcidae
- Genus: Pomboa; Huber, 2000

Type species
- P. quindio Huber, 2000

Species
- 4, see text

Genus of spiders

Pomboa is a genus of Colombian cellar spiders that was first described by B. A. Huber in 2000, and named in honour of Colombian poet Rafael Pombo.

== Species ==
As of June 2019 it contains four species, found only in Colombia:

- Pomboa cali Huber, 2000 – Colombia
- Pomboa pallida Huber, 2000 – Colombia
- Pomboa quimbaya Valdez-Mondragón, 2012 – Colombia
- Pomboa quindio Huber, 2000 (type) – Colombia

== See also ==
- List of Pholcidae species
- List of organisms named after famous people (born 1800–1899)
