= Papiamenta =

Scientific classification
- Kingdom: Animalia
- Phylum: Arthropoda
- Subphylum: Chelicerata
- Class: Arachnida
- Order: Araneae
- Infraorder: Araneomorphae
- Family: Pholcidae
- Genus: Papiamenta; Huber, 2000

Type species
- P. levii (Gertsch, 1982)

Species
- P. levii (Gertsch, 1982) – Curaçao; P. savonet Huber, 2000 – Curaçao

Genus of spiders

Papiamenta is a genus of Caribbean cellar spiders that was first described by B. A. Huber in 2000. As of June 2019 it contains only two species, found only on Curaçao: P. levii and P. savonet.

== See also ==
- List of Pholcidae species
