= Buitinga =

Scientific classification
- Kingdom: Animalia
- Phylum: Arthropoda
- Subphylum: Chelicerata
- Class: Arachnida
- Order: Araneae
- Infraorder: Araneomorphae
- Family: Pholcidae
- Genus: Buitinga; Huber, 2003

Type species
- B. kadogo Huber, 2003

Species
- 22, see text

Genus of spiders

Buitinga is a genus of African cellar spiders that was first described by B. A. Huber in 2003.

== Species ==
As of June 2019 it contains twenty-two species, found only in Africa:

- Buitinga amani Huber, 2003 – Tanzania
- Buitinga asax Huber, 2003 – Tanzania
- Buitinga batwa Huber & Warui, 2012 – Uganda
- Buitinga buhoma Huber, 2003 – Uganda
- Buitinga ensifera (Tullgren, 1910) – Tanzania
- Buitinga globosa (Tullgren, 1910) – Tanzania
- Buitinga griswoldi Huber, 2003 – Uganda
- Buitinga ifrit Huber & Cazanove, 2023 – Réunion
- Buitinga kadogo Huber, 2003 (type) – Tanzania
- Buitinga kanzuiri Huber, 2003 – Congo
- Buitinga kihanga Huber, 2003 – Tanzania
- Buitinga kikura Huber, 2003 – Congo
- Buitinga lakilingo Huber, 2003 – Tanzania
- Buitinga mazumbai Huber, 2003 – Tanzania
- Buitinga mbomole Huber, 2003 – Kenya, Tanzania
- Buitinga mulanje Huber, 2003 – Malawi
- Buitinga nigrescens (Berland, 1920) – Kenya, Tanzania
- Buitinga ruhiza Huber, 2003 – Uganda
- Buitinga ruwenzori Huber, 2003 – Congo, Uganda
- Buitinga safura Huber, 2003 – Tanzania
- Buitinga tingatingai Huber, 2003 – Tanzania
- Buitinga uzungwa Huber, 2003 – Tanzania
- Buitinga wataita Huber & Warui, 2012 – Kenya

== See also ==
- List of Pholcidae species
