= Giloloa =

Scientific classification
- Kingdom: Animalia
- Phylum: Arthropoda
- Subphylum: Chelicerata
- Class: Arachnida
- Order: Araneae
- Infraorder: Araneomorphae
- Family: Pholcidae
- Genus: Giloloa; Huber, 2019
- Species: G. sofifi

Binomial name
- Giloloa sofifi Huber, 2019

Genus of spiders

Giloloa is a monotypic genus of southeast Asian cellar spiders containing the single species, Giloloa sofifi. It was first described by B. A. Huber and L. S. Carvalho in 2019, and it has only been found in Indonesia.

== See also ==
- List of Pholcidae species
