= Hantu (spider) =

Scientific classification
- Domain: Eukaryota
- Kingdom: Animalia
- Phylum: Arthropoda
- Subphylum: Chelicerata
- Class: Arachnida
- Order: Araneae
- Infraorder: Araneomorphae
- Family: Pholcidae
- Genus: Hantu; Huber, 2016

Type species
- H. kapit Huber, 2016

Species
- H. kapit Huber, 2016 — Borneo; H. niah Huber, 2016 — Borneo

Genus of spiders

Hantu is a genus of cellar spiders first described by B. A. Huber in 2016. As of April 2019 it contains only two species.
