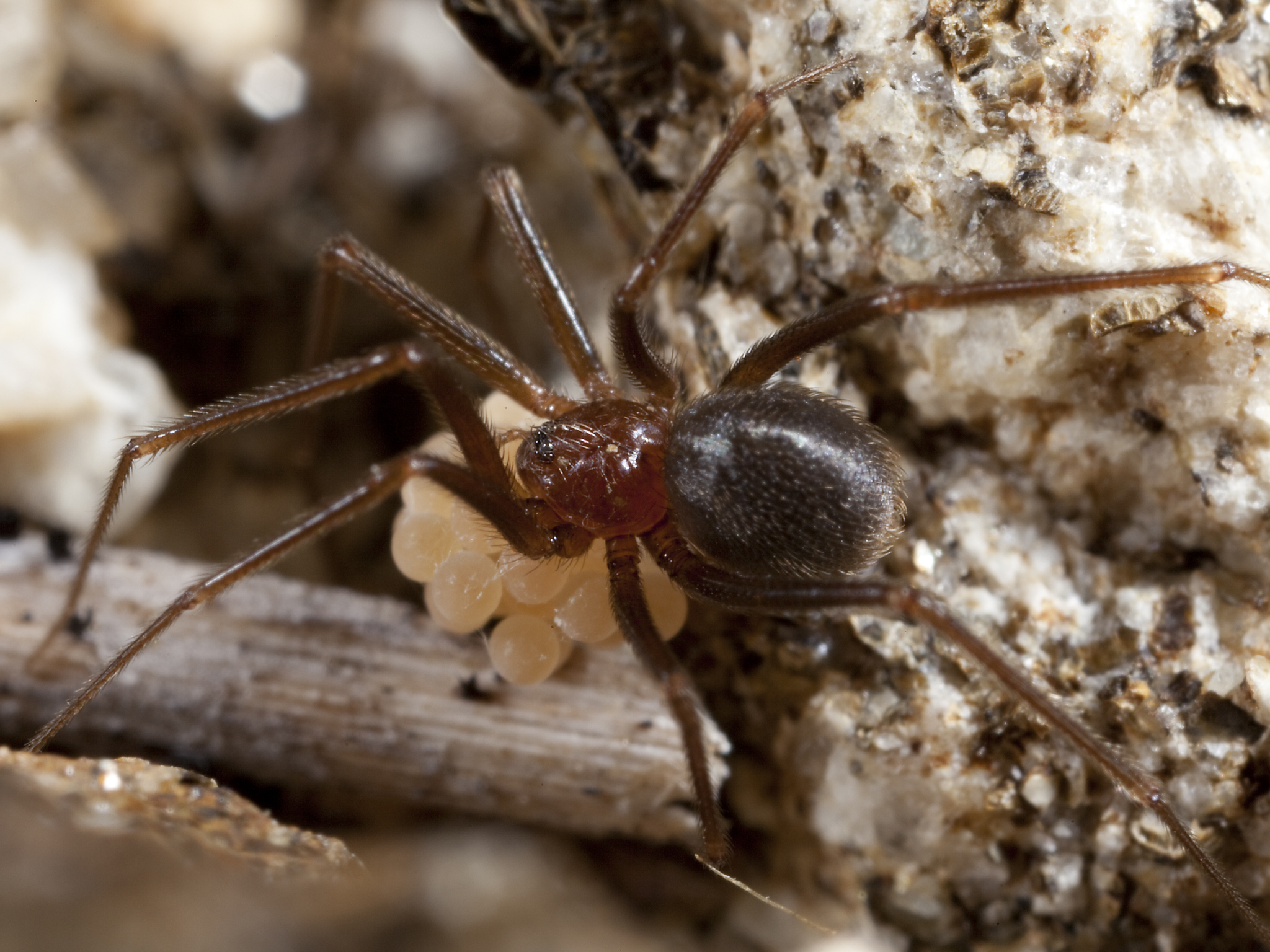
- Gertschiola macrostyla

Scientific classification
- Kingdom: Animalia
- Phylum: Arthropoda
- Subphylum: Chelicerata
- Class: Arachnida
- Order: Araneae
- Infraorder: Araneomorphae
- Family: Pholcidae
- Genus: Gertschiola; Brignoli, 1981

Type species
- G. macrostyla (Mello-Leitão, 1941)

Species
- G. macrostyla (Mello-Leitão, 1941) – Argentina; G. neuquena Huber, 2000 – Argentina

= Gertschiola =

Genus of spiders

Gertschiola is a genus of cellar spiders that was erected by Paolo Marcello Brignoli in 1981. As of June 2019 it contains only two species, found only in Argentina: G. macrostyla and G. neuquena.

== See also ==
- List of Pholcidae species
