= Nita elsaff =

Scientific classification
- Kingdom: Animalia
- Phylum: Arthropoda
- Subphylum: Chelicerata
- Class: Arachnida
- Order: Araneae
- Infraorder: Araneomorphae
- Family: Pholcidae
- Genus: Nita; Huber & El-Hennawy, 2007
- Species: N. elsaff

Binomial name
- Nita elsaff Huber & El-Hennawy, 2007

Genus of spiders

Nita is a monotypic genus of cellar spiders containing the single species, Nita elsaff. It was first described by B. A. Huber & H. K. El-Hennawy in 2007, and is found in Uzbekistan, Iran, and Egypt.

== See also ==
- List of Pholcidae species
