= Nyikoa =

Scientific classification
- Kingdom: Animalia
- Phylum: Arthropoda
- Subphylum: Chelicerata
- Class: Arachnida
- Order: Araneae
- Infraorder: Araneomorphae
- Family: Pholcidae
- Genus: Nyikoa; Huber, 2007
- Species: N. limbe

Binomial name
- Nyikoa limbe Huber, 2007

Genus of spiders

Nyikoa is a monotypic genus of Central African cellar spiders containing the single species, Nyikoa limbe. It was first described by B. A. Huber in 2007, and is only found in Africa.

== See also ==
- List of Pholcidae species
