= Ciboneya =

Scientific classification
- Kingdom: Animalia
- Phylum: Arthropoda
- Subphylum: Chelicerata
- Class: Arachnida
- Order: Araneae
- Infraorder: Araneomorphae
- Family: Pholcidae
- Genus: Ciboneya; Pérez, 2001

Type species
- C. nuriae Huber & Pérez, 2001

Species
- 4, see text

Genus of spiders

Ciboneya is a genus of Caribbean cellar spiders that was first described by B. A. Huber & A. Pérez G. in 2001.

== Species ==
As of June 2019 it contains four species, found only on the Greater Antilles:

- Ciboneya antraia Huber & Pérez, 2001 – Cuba
- Ciboneya nuriae Huber & Pérez, 2001 (type) – Cuba
- Ciboneya odilere Huber & Pérez, 2001 – Cuba
- Ciboneya parva Huber & Pérez, 2001 – Cuba

== See also ==
- List of Pholcidae species
