= Pemona =

Scientific classification
- Kingdom: Animalia
- Phylum: Arthropoda
- Subphylum: Chelicerata
- Class: Arachnida
- Order: Araneae
- Infraorder: Araneomorphae
- Family: Pholcidae
- Genus: Pemona; Huber, 2019
- Species: P. sapo

Binomial name
- Pemona sapo Huber, 2019

Genus of spiders

Pemona is a monotypic genus of South American cellar spiders containing the single species, Pemona sapo. It was first described by B. A. Huber and L. S. Carvalho in 2019, and it has only been found in Venezuela.

== See also ==
- List of Pholcidae species
