= Pehrforsskalia =

Scientific classification
- Kingdom: Animalia
- Phylum: Arthropoda
- Subphylum: Chelicerata
- Class: Arachnida
- Order: Araneae
- Infraorder: Araneomorphae
- Family: Pholcidae
- Genus: Pehrforsskalia; Deeleman-Reinhold & van Harten, 2001

Type species
- P. conopyga Deeleman-Reinhold & van Harten, 2001

Species
- P. bilene Huber, 2011; P. conopyga Deeleman-Reinhold & van Harten, 2001; P. shambaa Huber, 2011

Genus of spiders

Pehrforsskalia is a genus of cellar spiders that was first described by Christa Laetitia Deeleman-Reinhold & A. van Harten in 2001. Its three described species are found in Africa, Israel, and Yemen.

== Species ==
As of October 2025, this genus includes three species:

- Pehrforsskalia bilene Huber, 2011 – Mozambique
- Pehrforsskalia conopyga Deeleman-Reinhold & van Harten, 2001 – Africa, Yemen, Israel, Madagascar (type species)
- Pehrforsskalia shambaa Huber, 2011 – Tanzania

== See also ==
- List of Pholcidae species
