= Ixchela =

Scientific classification
- Kingdom: Animalia
- Phylum: Arthropoda
- Subphylum: Chelicerata
- Class: Arachnida
- Order: Araneae
- Infraorder: Araneomorphae
- Family: Pholcidae
- Genus: Ixchela; Huber, 2000

Type species
- I. furcula (F. O. Pickard-Cambridge, 1902)

Species
- 22, see text

Genus of spiders

Ixchela is a genus of spiders that belongs to the family Pholcidae (cellar spiders). Members of this genus can be found in El Salvador, Honduras, Guatemala, and Mexico.

== Taxonomy ==
The genus was first described by B. A. Huber in 2000 with the type species being Ixchela furcula.

=== Species ===
As of November 2021 this genus contains 22 described species. They are listed below:

- Ixchela abernathyi (Gertsch, 1971) – Mexico
- Ixchela azteca Valdez-Mondragón & Francke, 2015 – Mexico. Named after the Aztec people.
- Ixchela franckei Valdez-Mondragón, 2013 – Mexico
- Ixchela furcula (F. O. Pickard-Cambridge, 1902) (type) – Guatemala, Honduras, El Salvador
- Ixchela grix Valdez-Mondragón, 2013 – Mexico
- Ixchela huasteca Valdez-Mondragón, 2013 – Mexico. Named after La Huasteca, where this species is found.
- Ixchela huberi Valdez-Mondragón, 2013 – Mexico
- Ixchela jalisco Valdez-Mondragón & Francke, 2015 – Mexico. Named after the state of Jalisco, where this species is found.
- Ixchela juarezi Valdez-Mondragón, 2013 – Mexico. Named after Benito Juárez.
- Ixchela mendozai Valdez-Mondragón & Francke, 2015 – Mexico
- Ixchela mixe Valdez-Mondragón, 2013 – Mexico. Named after the Mixe people.
- Ixchela panchovillai Valdez-Mondragón, 2020 – Mexico. Named after Pancho Villa.
- Ixchela pecki (Gertsch, 1971) – Mexico
- Ixchela placida (Gertsch, 1971) – Mexico
- Ixchela purepecha Valdez-Mondragón & Francke, 2015 – Mexico. Named after the Purépecha people.
- Ixchela santibanezi Valdez-Mondragón, 2013 – Mexico
- Ixchela simoni (O. Pickard-Cambridge, 1898) – Mexico
- Ixchela taxco Valdez-Mondragón, 2013 – Mexico
- Ixchela tlayuda Valdez-Mondragón & Francke, 2015 – Mexico. Named after the tlayuda dish, typical of Oaxaca, where this species is found.
- Ixchela tzotzil Valdez-Mondragón, 2013 – Mexico. Named after the Tzotzil people.
- Ixchela viquezi Valdez-Mondragón, 2013 – Honduras
- Ixchela zapatai Valdez-Mondragón, 2020 – Mexico. Named after Emiliano Zapata.

== See also ==
- List of Pholcidae species
