= Galapa (spider) =

Scientific classification
- Kingdom: Animalia
- Phylum: Arthropoda
- Subphylum: Chelicerata
- Class: Arachnida
- Order: Araneae
- Infraorder: Araneomorphae
- Family: Pholcidae
- Genus: Galapa; Huber, 2000

Type species
- G. baerti (Gertsch & Peck, 1992)

Species
- G. baerti (Gertsch & Peck, 1992) – Ecuador (Galapagos Is.); G. bella (Gertsch & Peck, 1992) – Ecuador (Galapagos Is.); G. floreana Baert, 2014 – Ecuador (Galapagos Is.)

Genus of spiders

Galapa is a genus of Ecuadorian cellar spiders that was first described by B. A. Huber in 2000. As of June 2019 it contains only three species, found only on the Galápagos Islands: G. baerti, G. bella, and G. floreana.

== See also ==
- List of Pholcidae species
