= Cenemus =

Scientific classification
- Kingdom: Animalia
- Phylum: Arthropoda
- Subphylum: Chelicerata
- Class: Arachnida
- Order: Araneae
- Infraorder: Araneomorphae
- Family: Pholcidae
- Genus: Cenemus; Saaristo, 2001

Type species
- C. culiculus (Simon, 1898)

Species
- C. culiculus (Simon, 1898) – Seychelles; C. mikehilli Saaristo, 2002 – Seychelles; C. silhouette Saaristo, 2001 – Seychelles

Genus of spiders

Cenemus is a genus of Seychelloise cellar spiders that was first described by Michael I. Saaristo in 2001. As of June 2019 it contains only three species, found only on the Seychelles: C. culiculus, C. mikehilli, and C. silhouette.

== See also ==
- List of Pholcidae species
