= Aymaria =

Scientific classification
- Kingdom: Animalia
- Phylum: Arthropoda
- Subphylum: Chelicerata
- Class: Arachnida
- Order: Araneae
- Infraorder: Araneomorphae
- Family: Pholcidae
- Genus: Aymaria; Huber, 2000

Type species
- A. conica (Banks, 1902)

Species
- 7, see text

Genus of spiders

Aymaria is a genus of South American cellar spiders that was first described by B. A. Huber in 2000.

== Species ==
As of June 2019 it contains seven species, found in Ecuador, Argentina, Bolivia, and Peru:

- Aymaria calilegua Huber, 2000 – Peru, Bolivia, Argentina
- Aymaria conica (Banks, 1902) (type) – Ecuador (Galapagos Is.)
- Aymaria dasyops (Mello-Leitão, 1947) – Bolivia
- Aymaria floreana (Gertsch & Peck, 1992) – Ecuador (Galapagos Is.)
- Aymaria insularis (Banks, 1902) – Ecuador (Galapagos Is.)
- Aymaria jarmila (Gertsch & Peck, 1992) – Ecuador (Galapagos Is.)
- Aymaria pakitza Huber, 2000 – Peru

== See also ==
- List of Pholcidae species
