= Canaima (spider) =

Scientific classification
- Kingdom: Animalia
- Phylum: Arthropoda
- Subphylum: Chelicerata
- Class: Arachnida
- Order: Araneae
- Infraorder: Araneomorphae
- Family: Pholcidae
- Genus: Canaima; Huber, 2000

Type species
- C. arima (Gertsch, 1982)

Species
- 8, see text

Genus of spiders

Canaima is a genus of cellar spiders that was first described by B. A. Huber in 2000.

== Species ==
As of September 2022 it contains eight species, found in Venezuela and Trinidad:

- Canaima arima (Gertsch, 1982) (type) – Trinidad
- Canaima avila Huber, 2020 – Venezuela
- Canaima guaquira Huber, 2020 – Venezuela
- Canaima guaraque Huber, 2020 – Venezuela
- Canaima loca Huber, 2020 – Venezuela
- Canaima merida Huber, 2000 – Venezuela
- Canaima perlonga Huber, 2020 – Venezuela
- Canaima zerpa Huber, 2020 – Venezuela

== See also ==
- List of Pholcidae species
