= Wugigarra =

Scientific classification
- Kingdom: Animalia
- Phylum: Arthropoda
- Subphylum: Chelicerata
- Class: Arachnida
- Order: Araneae
- Infraorder: Araneomorphae
- Family: Pholcidae
- Genus: Wugigarra; Huber, 2001

Type species
- W. tjapukai Huber, 2001

Species
- 22, see text

Genus of spiders

Wugigarra is a genus of Australian cellar spiders that was first described by B. A. Huber in 2001.

== Species ==
As of June 2019 it contains twenty-two species, found in Western Australia, New South Wales, Queensland, and South Australia:

- Wugigarra arcoona Huber, 2001 – Australia (South Australia)
- Wugigarra bujundji Huber, 2001 – Australia (Queensland)
- Wugigarra bulburin Huber, 2001 – Australia (Queensland)
- Wugigarra burgul Huber, 2001 – Australia (Queensland)
- Wugigarra eberhardi Huber, 2001 – Australia (New South Wales)
- Wugigarra gia Huber, 2001 – Australia (Queensland)
- Wugigarra idi Huber, 2001 – Australia (Queensland)
- Wugigarra jiman Huber, 2001 – Australia (Queensland)
- Wugigarra kalamai Huber, 2001 – Australia (Western Australia)
- Wugigarra kaurna Huber, 2001 – Australia (South Australia)
- Wugigarra mamu Huber, 2001 – Australia (Queensland)
- Wugigarra muluridji Huber, 2001 – Australia (Queensland)
- Wugigarra nauo Huber, 2001 – Australia (South Australia)
- Wugigarra sphaeroides (L. Koch, 1872) – Australia (Queensland)
- Wugigarra tjapukai Huber, 2001 (type) – Australia (Queensland)
- Wugigarra undanbi Huber, 2001 – Australia (Queensland)
- Wugigarra wanjuru Huber, 2001 – Australia (Queensland)
- Wugigarra wiri Huber, 2001 – Australia (Queensland)
- Wugigarra wulpura Huber, 2001 – Australia (Queensland)
- Wugigarra wunderlichi (Deeleman-Reinhold, 1995) – Australia (Queensland)
- Wugigarra yawai Huber, 2001 – Australia (Queensland, New South Wales)
- Wugigarra yirgay Huber, 2001 – Australia (Queensland)

== See also ==
- List of Pholcidae species
