= Priscula =

Scientific classification
- Kingdom: Animalia
- Phylum: Arthropoda
- Subphylum: Chelicerata
- Class: Arachnida
- Order: Araneae
- Infraorder: Araneomorphae
- Family: Pholcidae
- Genus: Priscula; Simon, 1893

Type species
- P. gularis Simon, 1893

Species
- 20, see text

Synonyms
- Blechroscelis Simon, 1893; Hypsorinus Chamberlin, 1916

Genus of spiders

Priscula is a genus of South American cellar spiders that was first described by Eugène Louis Simon in 1893.

== Species ==
As of April 2022 it contains 20 species, found only in South America:

- Priscula acarite (Huber, 2020) – Venezuela
- Priscula andinensis González-Sponga, 1999 – Venezuela
- Priscula annulipes (Keyserling, 1877) – Colombia
- Priscula binghamae (Chamberlin, 1916) – Peru, Bolivia, Argentina
- Priscula bolivari (Huber, 2020) – Venezuela
- Priscula chejapi González-Sponga, 1999 – Venezuela
- Priscula gularis Simon, 1893 (type) – Ecuador
- Priscula huila Huber, 2000 – Colombia
- Priscula lagunosa González-Sponga, 1999 – Venezuela
- Priscula limonensis González-Sponga, 1999 – Venezuela
- Priscula paeza Huber, 2000 – Colombia
- Priscula paila (Huber, 2020) – Venezuela
- Priscula pallisteri Huber, 2000 – Peru
- Priscula piapoco Huber, 2000 – Venezuela
- Priscula piedraensis González-Sponga, 1999 – Venezuela
- Priscula salmeronica González-Sponga, 1999 – Venezuela
- Priscula taruma Huber, 2000 – Guyana
- Priscula tunebo Huber, 2000 – Venezuela
- Priscula ulai González-Sponga, 1999 – Venezuela
- Priscula venezuelana Simon, 1893 – Venezuela

== See also ==
- List of Pholcidae species
