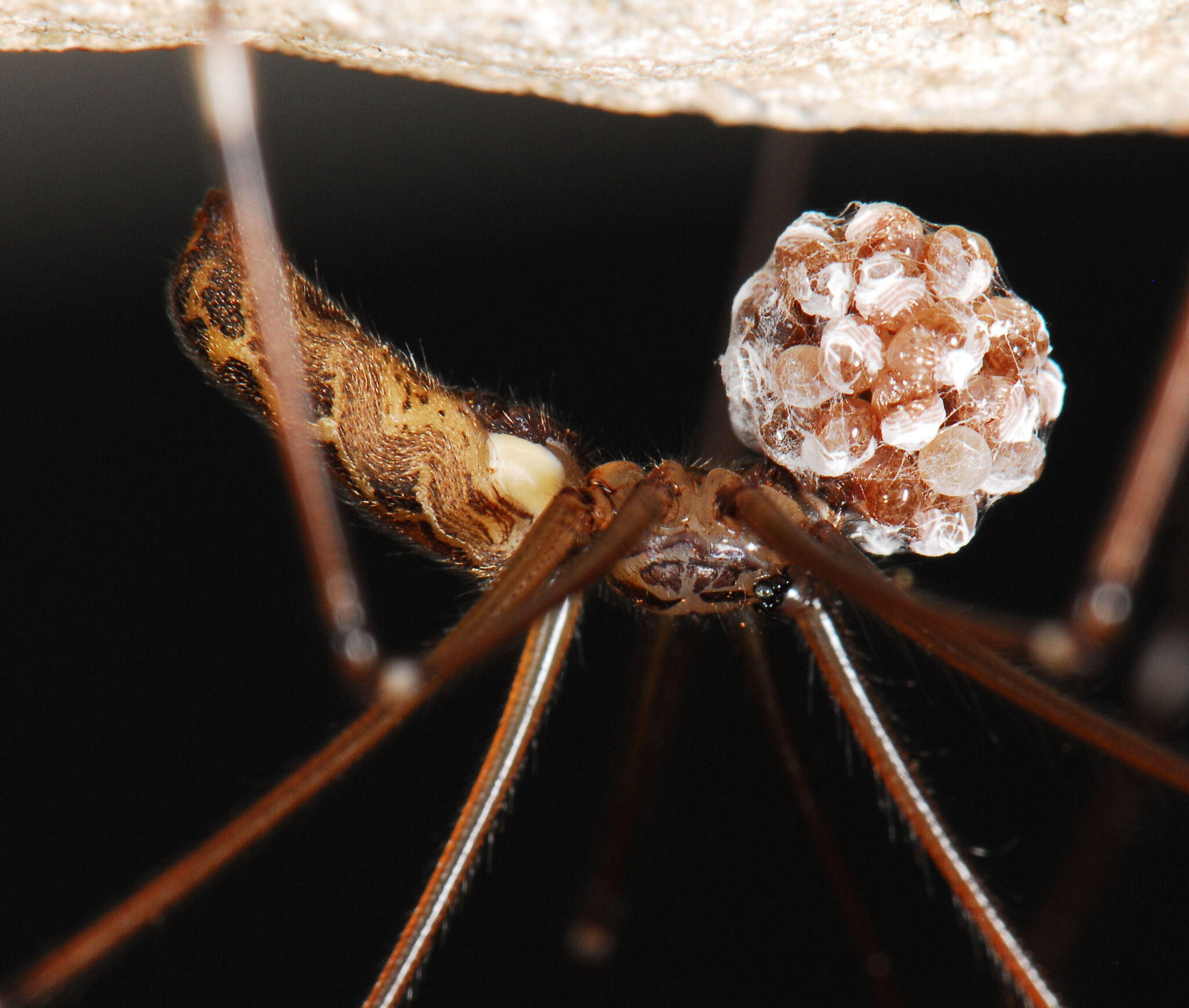
- female Smeringopus natalensis with eggs
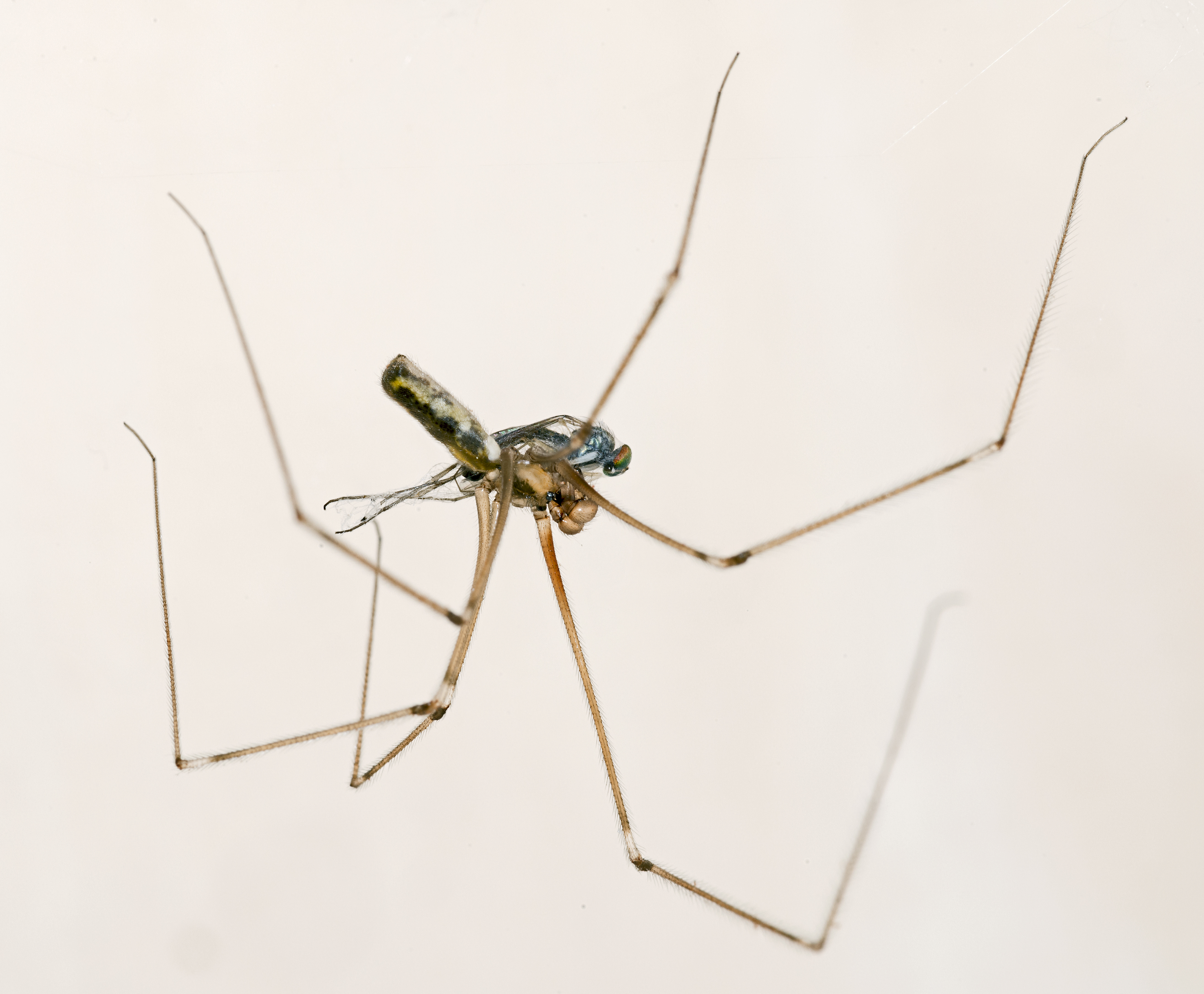
- male Pholcus phalangioides

Scientific classification
- Kingdom: Animalia
- Phylum: Arthropoda
- Subphylum: Chelicerata
- Class: Arachnida
- Order: Araneae
- Infraorder: Araneomorphae
- Family: Pholcidae; C. L. Koch, 1850

Diversity
- 97 genera, 2,055 species
- blue: reported countries (WSC) green: observation hotspots (iNaturalist)

= Pholcidae =

Pholcidae Temporal range: 66–0 Ma Paleogene - Present

Family of spiders

The Pholcidae are a family of araneomorph spiders. The family contains more than 2,000 individual species of pholcids, including those commonly known as cellar spider, daddy long-legs spider, carpenter spider, daddy long-legger, vibrating spider, gyrating spider, long daddy, money spider, and angel spider. The family, first described by Carl Ludwig Koch in 1850, is divided into 94 genera.

The common name "daddy long-legs" is used for several species, especially Pholcus phalangioides, but is also the common name for several other arthropod groups, including harvestmen and crane flies.

== Appearance ==
Pholcids have extremely long and thin legs with flexible tarsi. They can be distinguished from other long-legged spiders by the eye arrangement: Pholcidae have two groups of three eyes each, and there may be a pair of small eyes in between them. Most have this middle pair present for a total of eight eyes, but some genera (e.g. Modisimus, Spermophora, Spermophorides) lack this pair and have a total of six eyes. The body is often whitish or grey in colour. Harvestmen (Opiliones), which share the name "daddy longlegs", also have long and thin legs but have only one pair of eyes, and their body appears to be a single segment.

Like other spiders, pholcids have two body segments, the prosoma and opisthosoma. The prosoma may be evenly domed (e.g. Pholcus, Micropholcus) or have a furrow or pit in the middle. The opisthosoma may be long and cylindrical (e.g. Pholcus, Holocnemus), long and pointed dorso-posteriorly (e.g. Crossopriza) or short (e.g. Micropholcus).

There is variation in size, ranging from just over 1 millimetre (Spermophorides lascars) to 11 mm (Artema atlanta) in body length.

== Habitat ==
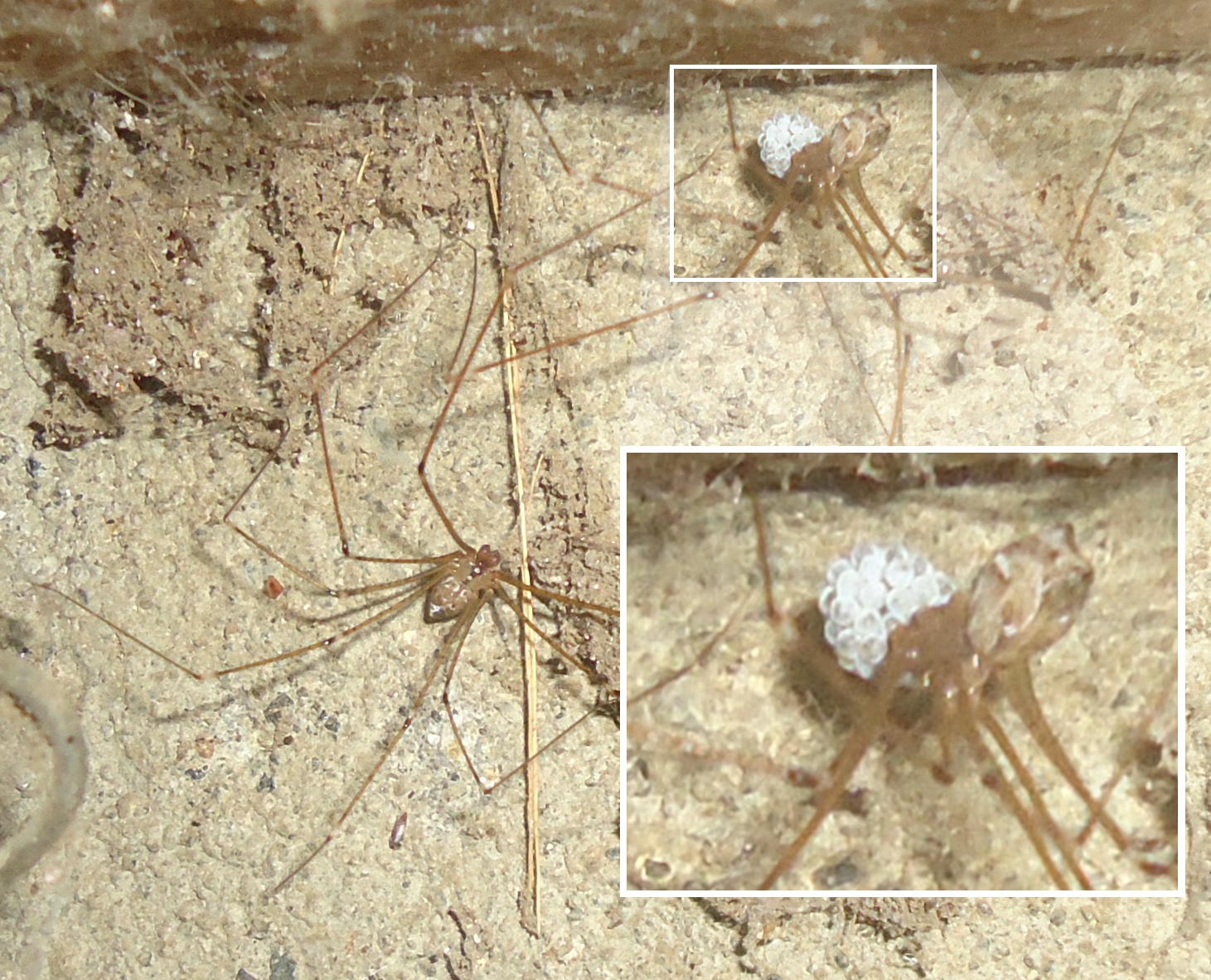
Two Crossopriza lyoni. The bottom one is male. The female is clutching her egg bundle

Pholcids are found in every continent in the world, except Antarctica. Pholcids hang inverted in their messy and irregular-shaped webs. These webs are constructed in dark and damp recesses such as in caves, under rocks and loose bark, and in abandoned mammal burrows. In areas of human habitation pholcids construct webs in undisturbed areas in buildings such as high corners, attics and cellars, hence the common name "cellar spider".

== Behavior ==
Cellar spider vibrating rapidly in response to a threat

=== Trapping ===
The web of pholcids has no adhesive properties and instead relies on its irregular structure to trap prey. When pholcid spiders detect prey within their webs the spiders quickly envelop prey with silk-like material. The prey may be eaten immediately or stored for later. When finished feeding they will clean the web by unhooking the remains of the prey and letting the carcass drop from the web. They are passive against humans.

=== Threat response ===
Some species of Pholcidae exhibit a threat response when disturbed by a touch to the web or entangled large prey. The arachnid responds by vibrating rapidly in a gyrating motion in its web, which may sometimes fall into a circular rhythm. It may oscillate in tune with the elasticity of the web causing an oscillation larger than the motion of the spider's legs. While other species of spider exhibit this behaviour, such behavior by the Pholcidae species has led to these spiders sometimes being called "vibrating spiders". There are several proposed reasons for this threat response. The movement may make it difficult for a predator to locate or strike the spider, or may be a signal to an assumed rival to leave. Vibrating may also increase the chances of capturing insects that have just brushed their web and are still hovering nearby, or further entangle prey that may have otherwise been able to free itself. If the spider continues to be disturbed, it will retreat into a corner or drop from its web and escape.

=== Diet ===
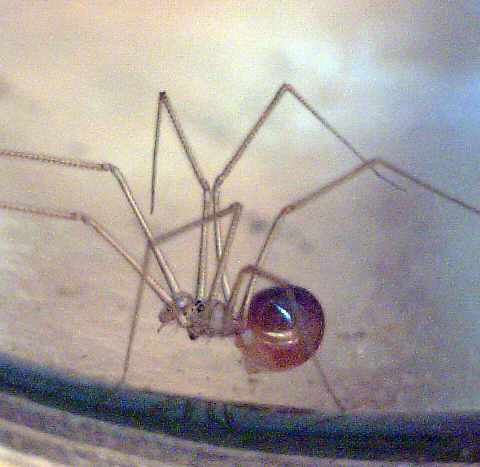
Male shortbodied cellar spider (Spermophora senoculata) from the United States

Although they do eat insects, certain species of these spiders invade webs of other spiders to eat the host, the eggs, or the prey. In some cases, the spider vibrates the web of other spiders, mimicking the struggle of trapped prey to lure the host closer. Pholcids prey on Tegenaria funnel weaver spiders, and are known to attack and eat redback spiders, huntsman spiders and house spiders.

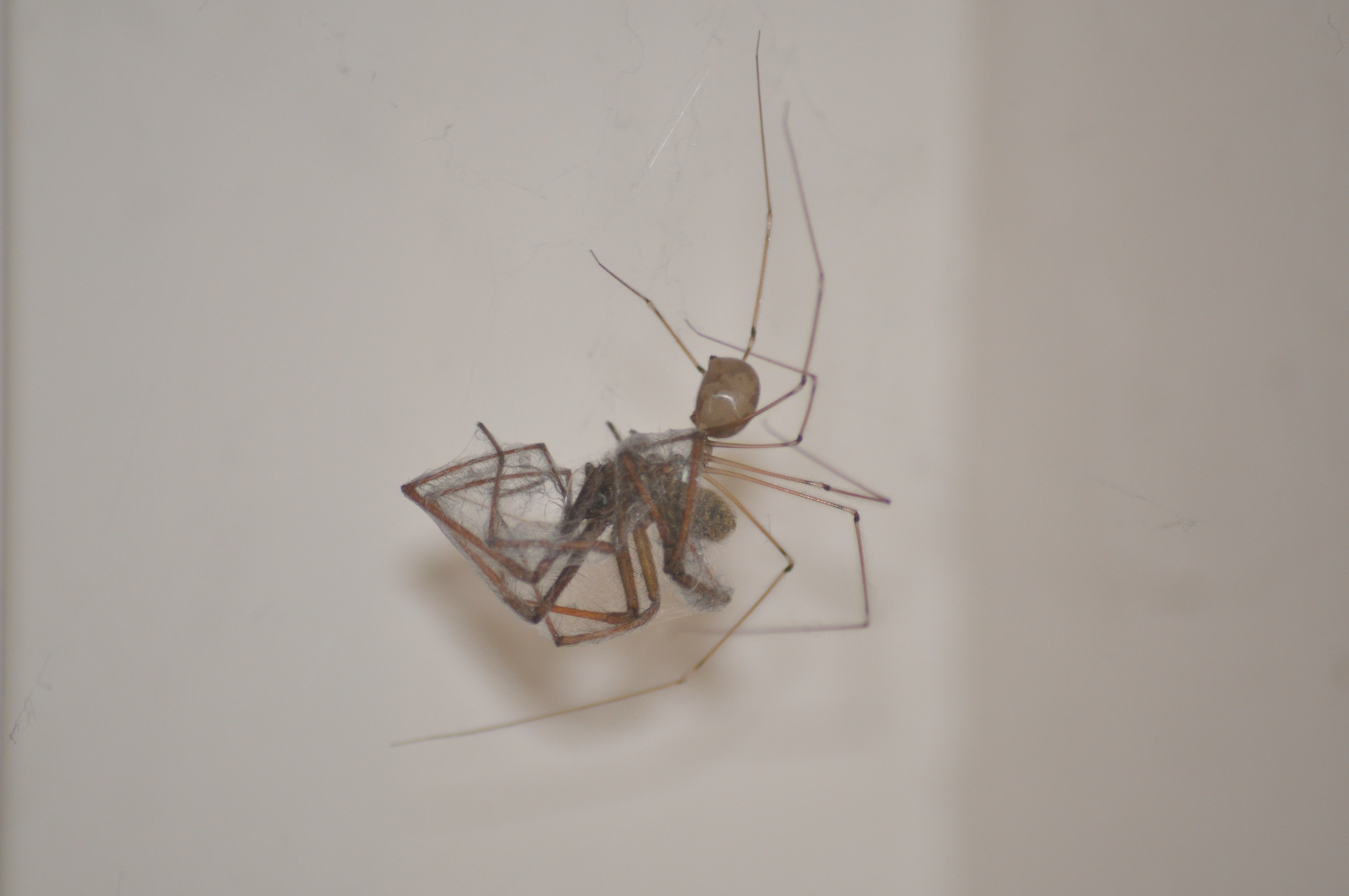
A cellar spider which has captured a house spider, in a domestic setting. The predator spider has noticeably grown in abdomen size during feeding, whilst the prey appears diminished.

Pholcids may be beneficial to humans living in regions with dense hobo spider populations as predation on Tegenaria may keep populations in check. They have also been observed to feed on the spider Steatoda nobilis in countries like Ireland and England.

=== Gait ===
Pholcus phalangioides often uses an alternating tetrapod gait (first right leg, then second left leg, then third right leg, etc.), which is commonly found in many spider species. However, frequent variations from this pattern have been documented during observations of the spiders' movements.

== Misconceptions ==
There is an urban legend that daddy long-legs spiders have the most potent venom of any spider but that their fangs are either too small or too weak to puncture human skin; the same legend is also repeated of the harvestman and crane fly, also known as daddy long-legs in some regions. This is not true for any of the three. While Pholcidae are indeed capable of biting humans, their venom is not medically significant, and neither harvestmen nor crane flies have any venom or fangs to speak of. Indeed, pholcid spiders do have a short fang structure (called uncate due to its "hooked" shape). Brown recluse spiders also have uncate fang structure, but are able to deliver medically significant bites.

Possible explanations include the following: pholcid venom is not toxic to humans; pholcid uncate are smaller than those of brown recluse; or there is a musculature difference between the two arachnids, with recluses, being hunting spiders, possessing stronger muscles for fang penetration. According to Rick Vetter of the University of California, Riverside, the daddy long-legs spider has never harmed a human physically, and there is no evidence that they are dangerous to humans.

The legend may result from the fact that the daddy long-legs spider preys upon deadly venomous spiders, such as the redback, and other members of the true widow genus Latrodectus. To the extent that such arachnological information was known to the general public, it was perhaps thought that if the daddy long-legs spider could kill a spider capable of delivering fatal bites to humans, then it must be more venomous, and the uncate fangs were regarded as prohibiting it from killing people. In reality, it is able to cast lengths of silk onto its prey, incapacitating them from a safe distance.

=== Mythbusters experiment ===
During 2004, the Discovery Channel television show MythBusters tested the daddy long-legs venom myth in episode 13, "Buried in Concrete". Hosts Jamie Hyneman and Adam Savage first established that the spider's venom was not as toxic as other venoms, after being told about an experiment wherein mice were injected with venom from both a daddy long-legs and a black widow, with the black widow venom producing a much stronger reaction. After measuring the spider's fangs at approximately 0.25 mm, Adam Savage inserted his hand into a container with several daddy-long-legs, and reported that he felt a bite which produced a mild, short-lived burning sensation. The bite did in fact penetrate his skin, but did not cause any notable harm. Additionally, recent research has shown that pholcid venom is relatively weak in its effects on insects.

== Genera ==
As of January 2026, this family includes 97 genera and 2,055 species:

- Aetana Huber, 2005 – Indonesia, Malaysia, Philippines, Fiji
- Anansus Huber, 2007 – Africa
- Anopsicus Chamberlin & Ivie, 1938 – North America, Galapagos, Venezuela
- Apokayana Huber, 2018 – Indonesia, Malaysia
- Arenita Huber & Carvalho, 2019 – Brazil
- Arnapa Huber, 2019 – Indonesia, New Guinea
- Artema Walckenaer, 1837 – Africa, Asia, Cyprus, Greece. Introduced worldwide
- Aucana Huber, 2000 – New Caledonia, Chile
- Aymaria Huber, 2000 – South America
- Belisana (spider) Thorell, 1898 – Asia, Oceania Introduced to the Netherlands
- Blancoa (spider) Huber, 2000 – Venezuela
- Boconita Huber, 2020 – Venezuela
- Buitinga Huber, 2003 – Congo, Eastern Africa
- Caipira Huber, 2026 – Brazil
- Calapnita Simon, 1892 – Southeast Asia
- Canaima Huber, 2000 – Trinidad, Venezuela
- Cantikus Huber, 2018 – Asia
- Carapoia González-Sponga, 1998 – South America, Brazil
- Cenemus Saaristo, 2001 – Seychelles
- Changminia Yao & Li, 2022 – China, Thailand
- Chibchea Huber, 2000 – South America
- Chisosa Huber, 2000 – Caribbean, Mexico, United States, Venezuela
- Ciboneya Pérez, 2001 – Cuba
- Coryssocnemis Simon, 1893 – Trinidad, Honduras, Mexico, Brazil, Venezuela
- Crossopriza Simon, 1893 – Africa, Asia. Introduced to Germany, Belgium, Australia, Americas
- Enetea Huber, 2000 – Bolivia
- Galapa Huber, 2000 – Costa Rica, Colombia, Galapagos, Venezuela
- Gertschiola Brignoli, 1981 – Argentina
- Giloloa Huber, 2019 – Indonesia
- Guaranita Huber, 2000 – Argentina, Brazil
- Hantu Huber, 2016 – Borneo
- Holocneminus Berland, 1942 – Indonesia, Oceania
- Holocnemus Simon, 1873 – North Africa, Caucasus, Turkey, Southern Europe. Introduced worldwide
- Hoplopholcus Kulczyński, 1908 – Western Asia, Europe
- Ibotyporanga Mello-Leitão, 1944 – Brazil, Colombia, Venezuela
- Ixchela Huber, 2000 – El Salvador, Guatemala, Honduras, Mexico
- Kairona Huber & Carvalho, 2019 – Brazil
- Kambiwa Huber, 2000 – Brazil
- Kelabita Huber, 2018 – Malaysia, Borneo
- Khorata Huber, 2005 – China, Southeast Asia
- Kintaqa Huber, 2018 – Malaysia, Thailand
- Leptopholcus Simon, 1893 – Africa, Asia
- Litoporus Simon, 1893 – South America
- Lyleka Huber, 2026 – Brazil
- Magana Huber, 2019 – Oman
- Maghreba Huber, 2022 – Algeria, Morocco
- Mecolaesthus Simon, 1893 – Caribbean, South America
- Meraha Huber, 2018 – Southeast Asia
- Mesabolivar González-Sponga, 1998 – Trinidad, Trinidad and Tobago, South America, Guayana
- Metagonia Simon, 1893 – North America, South America
- Micromerys Bradley, 1877 – Australia, New Guinea
- Micropholcus Deeleman-Reinhold & Prinsen, 1987 – Morocco, Philippines, Oman, Saudi Arabia, Yemen, Caribbean, Brazil, Venezuela, Temperate Asia. Introduced worldwide
- Modisimus Simon, 1893 – North America, Colombia, Galapagos, Venezuela. Introduced worldwide
- Muruta Huber, 2018 – Malaysia
- Nerudia Huber, 2000 – Argentina, Chile
- Ninetis Simon, 1890 – Africa, Oman, Saudi Arabia, Yemen
- Nipisa Huber, 2018 – Southeast Asia
- Nita Huber & El-Hennawy, 2007 – Algeria, Egypt, Uzbekistan, Iran, Iraq
- Nyikoa Huber, 2007 – Central Africa
- Ossinissa Dimitrov & Ribera, 2005 – Canary Islands
- Otavaloa Huber, 2000 – South America
- Paiwana Huber, 2018 – Taiwan
- Panjange Deeleman-Reinhold & Deeleman, 1983 – Indonesia, Philippines, Australia, New Guinea
- Papiamenta Huber, 2000 – Bonaire, Curaçao
- Paramicromerys Millot, 1946 – Madagascar
- Pehrforsskalia Deeleman-Reinhold & van Harten, 2001 – Madagascar, Mozambique, Tanzania, Israel, Yemen
- Pemona Huber, 2019 – Venezuela
- Pholcitrichocyclus Ceccolini & Cianferoni, 2022 – Australia
- Pholcophora Banks, 1896 – Bahamas, North America
- Pholcus Walckenaer, 1805 – Worldwide
- Physocyclus Simon, 1893 – United States to Brazil. Introduced worldwide
- Pinoquio Huber & Carvalho, 2022 – Brazil
- Pisaboa Huber, 2000 – Bolivia, Peru, Venezuela
- Pomboa Huber, 2000 – Colombia
- Pribumia Huber, 2018 – Southeast Asia
- Priscula Simon, 1893 – South America
- Psilochorus Simon, 1893 – North America, Brazil, Ecuador. Introduced to Morocco, Turkey, New Zealand
- Quamtana Huber, 2003 – Africa
- Saciperere Huber & Carvalho, 2019 – Brazil
- Savarna Huber, 2005 – Indonesia, Malaysia, Thailand
- Smeringopina Kraus, 1957 – Africa
- Smeringopus Simon, 1890 – Africa, Yemen. Introduced worldwide
- Spermophora Hentz, 1841 – Africa, Asia, Oceania, Brazil. Introduced worldwide
- Spermophorides Wunderlich, 1992 – Seychelles, Tanzania, Canary Islands, Western Mediterranean, Savage Islands. Introduced to Belgium
- Stenosfemuraia González-Sponga, 1998 – Venezuela
- Stygopholcus Kratochvíl, 1932 – Southern Europe
- Systenita Simon, 1893 – Venezuela
- Tainonia Huber, 2000 – Hispaniola
- Tangguoa Yao & Li, 2021 – China
- Teranga Huber, 2018 – Indonesia, Philippines
- Tibetia Zhang, Zhu & Song, 2006 – Tibet
- Tissahamia Huber, 2018 – Southeast Asia, Sri Lanka
- Tolteca Huber, 2000 – Mexico
- Tupigea Huber, 2000 – Brazil
- Uthina Simon, 1893 – Southeast Asia, Sri Lanka, Australia, Pacific Islands. Introduced to Réunion, Seychelles, Taiwan
- Wanniyala Huber & Benjamin, 2005 – Sri Lanka
- Waunana Huber, 2000 – Panama, Colombia, Ecuador
- Wugigarra Huber, 2001 – Australia
- Zatavua Huber, 2003 – Madagascar
- † Rovnospermophoridus Wunderlich, 2026 – Rovno amber – Eocene

== Relationships ==
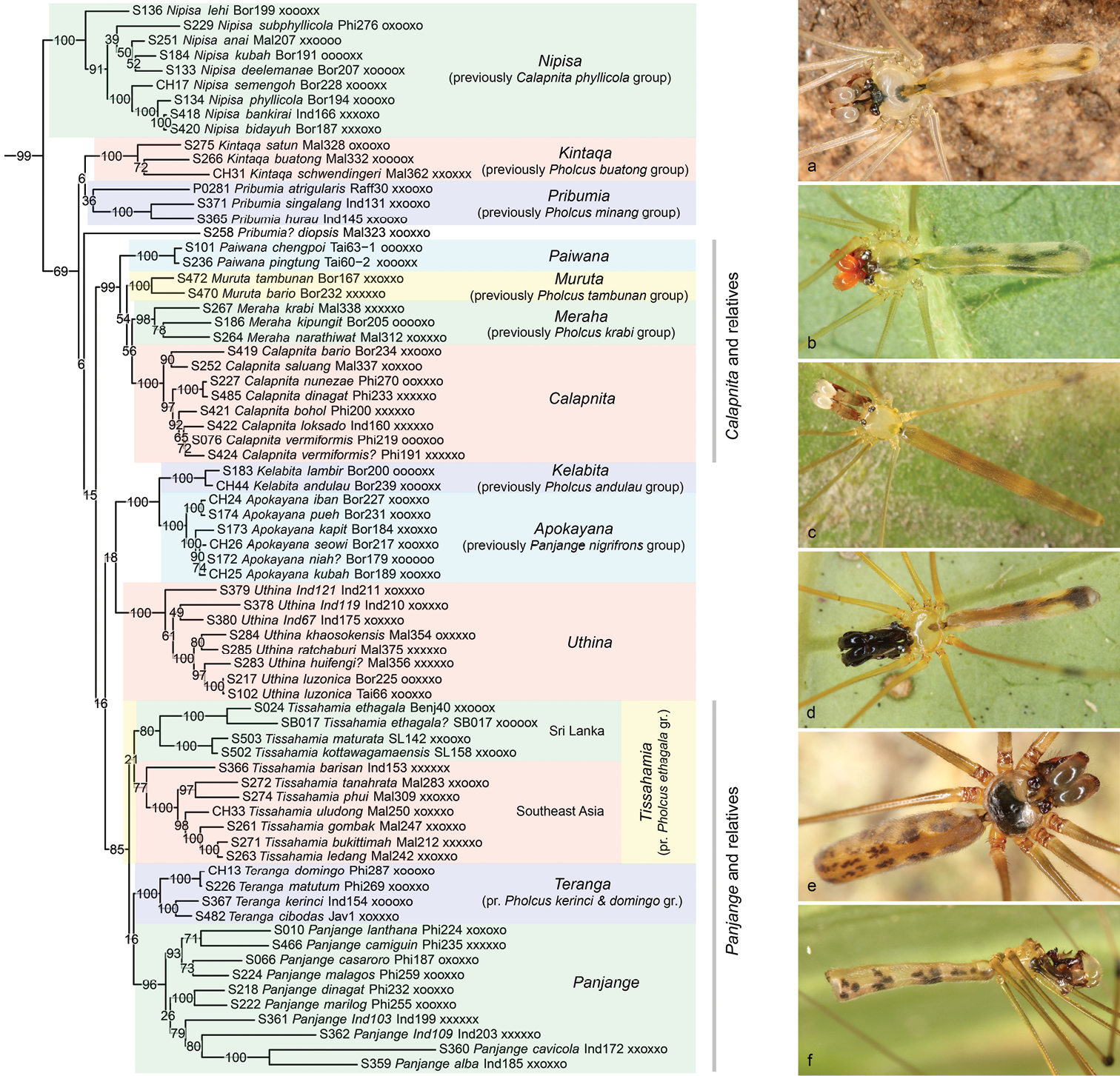

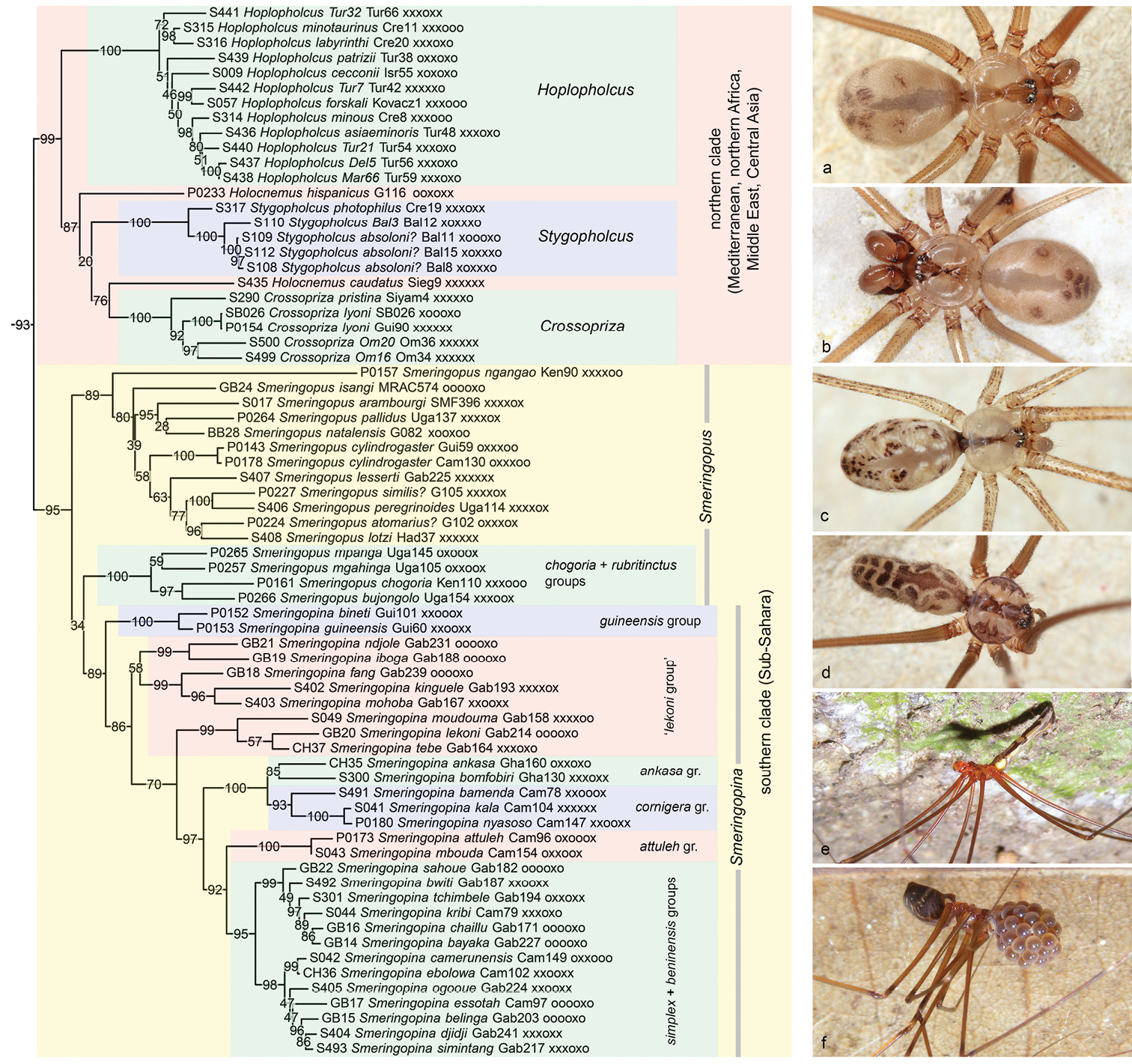

== Gallery ==
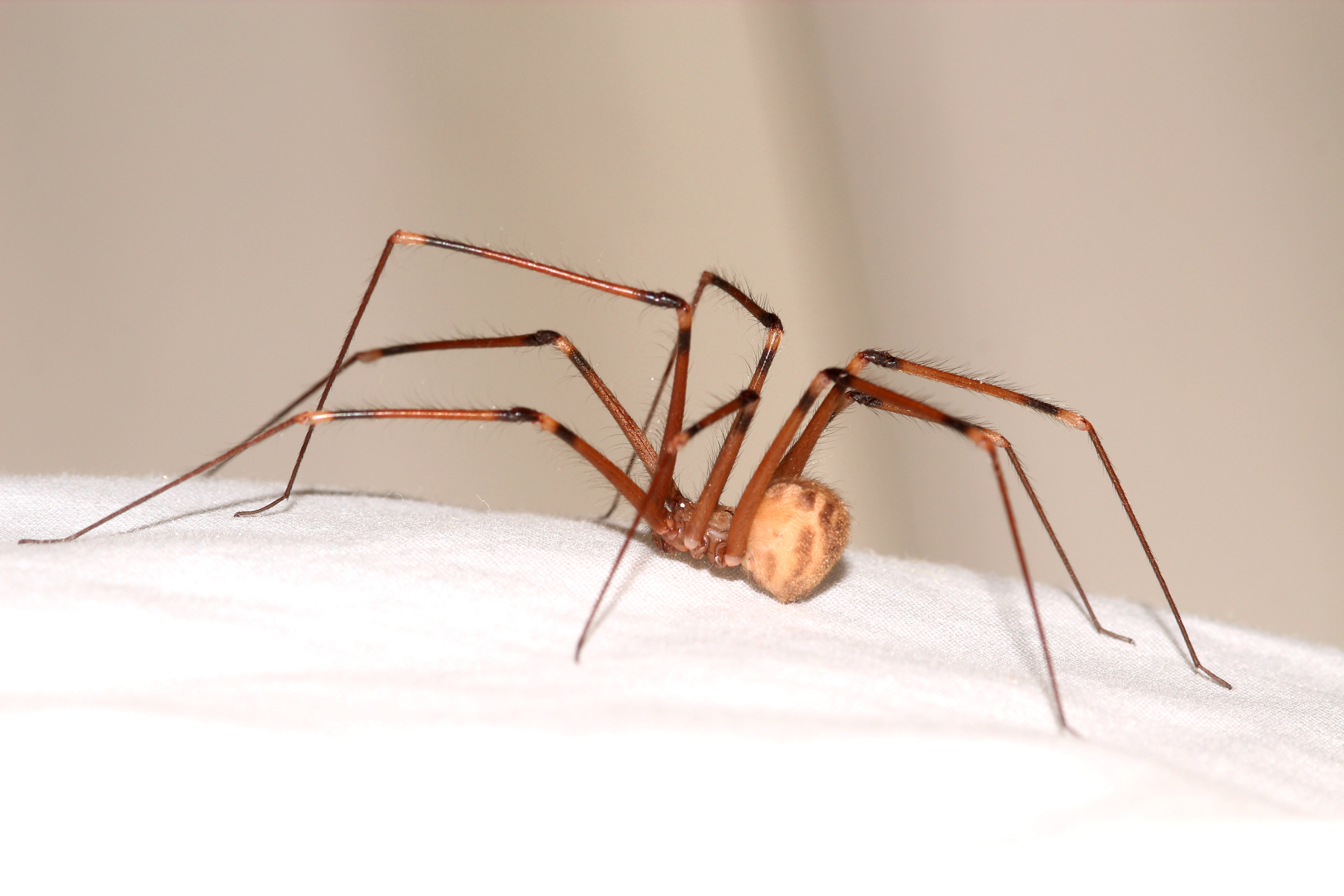
Artema nephilit

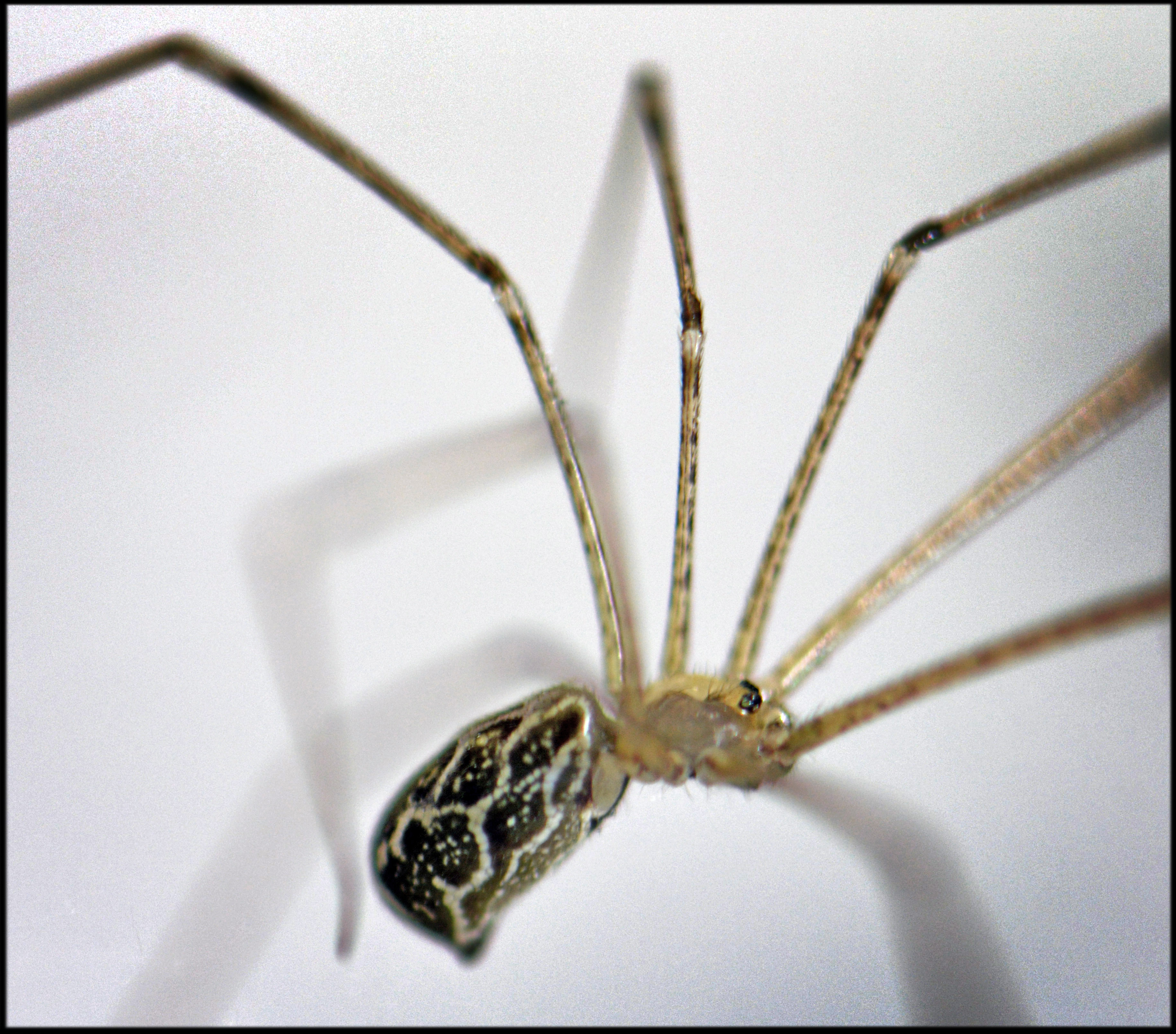
Holocnemus pluchei

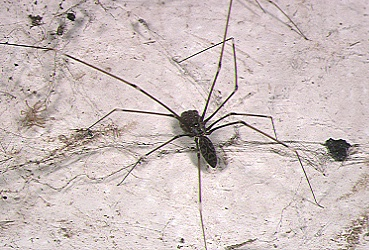
Smeringopus pallidus female with egg sac

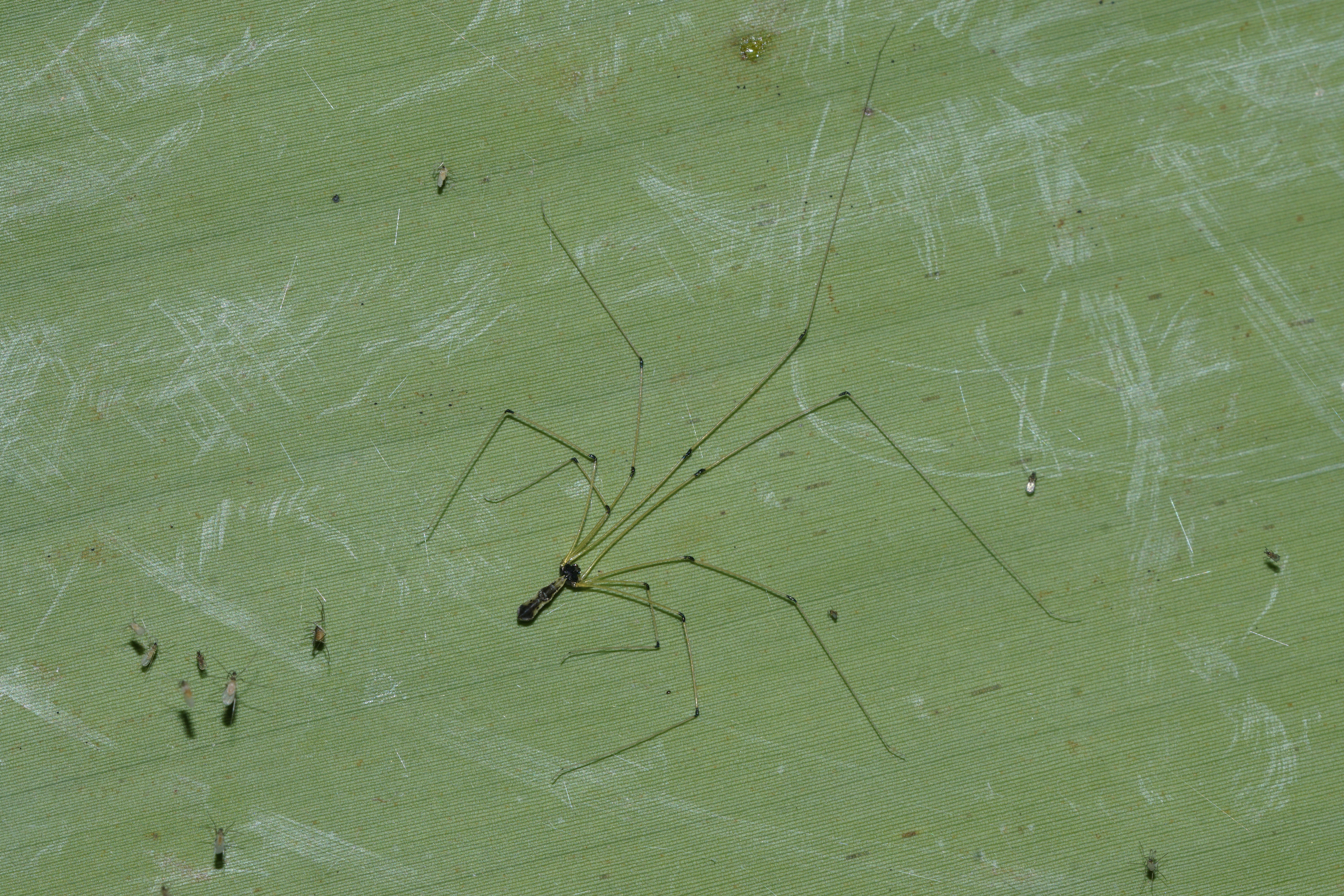
Uthina atrigularis
