= List of spiders of Pakistan =

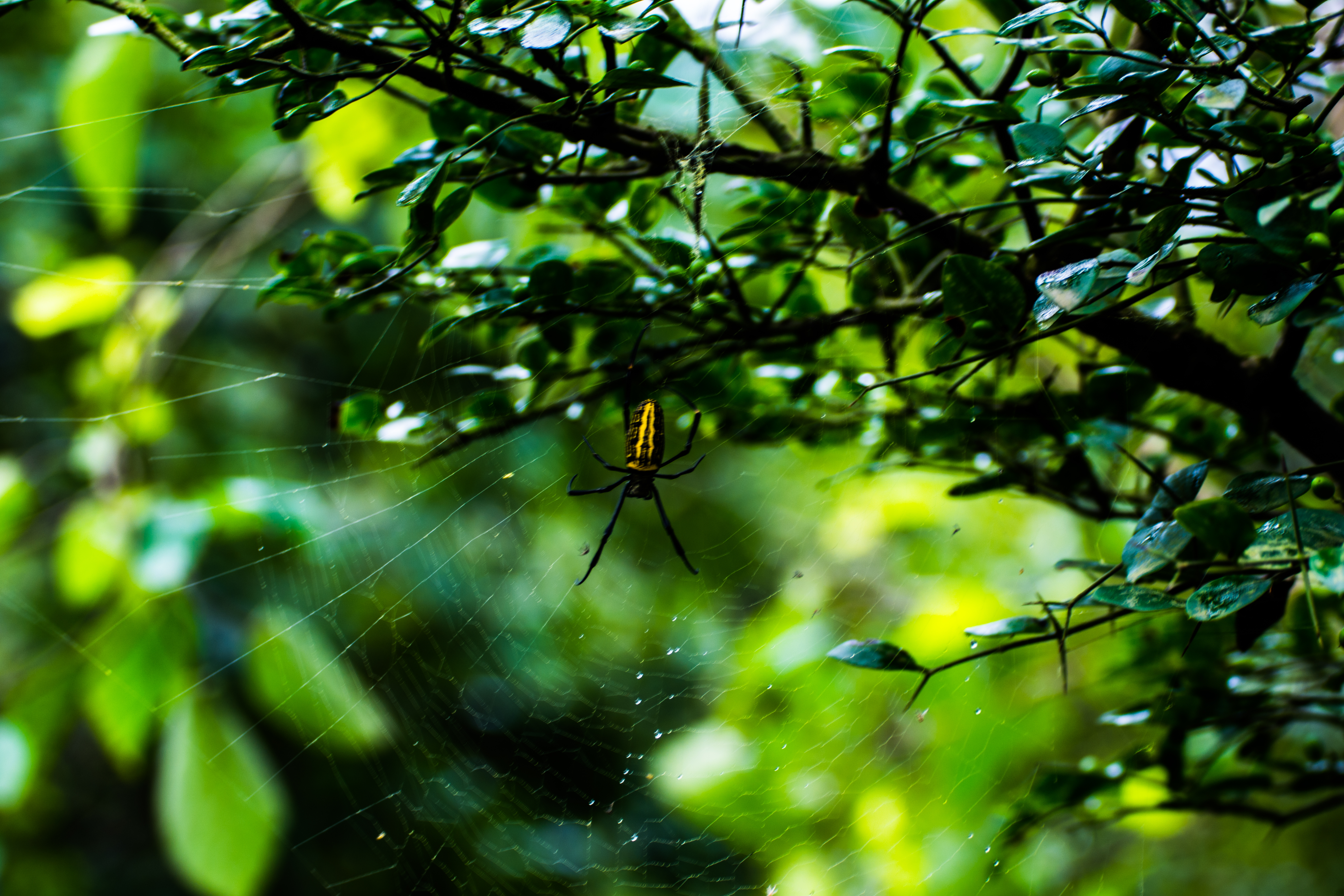
Nephila pilipes in Margalla Hills.

The following is a list of spiders of Pakistan.

- Species list

== Family Araneidae ==
- Genus Argiope
  - Argiope australis - found in Dadu, Pakistan (August 2022)
- Genus Eriovixia
  - Eriovixia excelsa - found in Islamabad, Lahore, Dayal, Goro Hills, Khyber Pakhtunkhwa, North Pakistan, Pakistan
- Genus Neoscona
  - Neoscona crucifera - Found in Faisalabad
- Genus Nephila
  - Nephila pilipes - Margalla hills, Islamabad

== Family Eresidae ==
- Genus Stegodyphus
  - Stegodyphus pacificus - found in Peshawar (1984)
  - Stegodyphus sarasinorum - found in Lahore (1935) and in Faisalabad, Okara and Sialkot (1997)

== Family Hersiliidae ==
- Genus Hersilia
  - Hersilia savignyi - found in Leiah, Okara and Sahiwal (1997)

== Family Oecobiidae ==
- Genus Uroctea
  - Uroctea matthaii - Found in some houses of Faisalabad (1996)

== Family Oonopidae ==
- Genus Opopaea
  - Opopaea batanguena - found in Faisalabad (1996)

== Family Pholcidae ==
- Genus Crossopriza
  - Crossopriza lyoni - found in Okara (1996) and Faisalabad (1998)

== Family Salticidae ==
- Genus Habrocestum
  - Habrocestum coecatus (or Habronattus coronatum) - found in Faisalabad (1996) and Leiah (1998)
- Genus Hyllus
  - Hyllus bengalensis (previously Phidippus bengalensis) - found in many localities of Punjab
  - Hyllus semicupreus (previously Phidippus indicus) - found in various localities of Punjab
- Genus Marpissa
  - Marpissa anusuae - found in various localities of Punjab
  - Marpissa decorata - found in Faisalabad, Khanewal, Rawalpindi and Vehari (1997)
  - Marpissa muscosa - found in Faisalabad, Sahiwal, Leiah and Jhang (1998)
  - Marpissa tigrina - found in many localities of Punjab
- Genus Myrmarachne
  - Myrmarachne bengalensis - found in Faisalabad and Sheikhupura (1998)
  - Myrmarachne laeta - found in Faisalabad (1996)
  - Myrmarachne maratha - found in many localities of Punjab
  - Myrmarachne orientales - found in many localities of Punjab
- Genus Phintella
  - Phintella vittata (previously Salticus ranjitus) - found in many localities of Punjab
- Genus Phlegra
  - Phlegra dhakuriensis - found in many localities of Punjab
- Genus Plexippus
  - Plexippus calcutaensis (also Plexippus bengalensis) - found in Faisalabad (1998)
  - Plexippus paykulli - found in many localities of Punjab
- Genus Rhene
  - Rhene danieli - found in Faisalabad (1997)
  - Rhene decorata - found in Faisalabad and Vehari (1997)
  - Rhene indica - found in Faisalabad (1997)
- Genus Telamonia
  - Telamonia dimidiata (previously Phidippus pateli) - found in many localities of Punjab
- Genus Thiania
  - Thiania aura - found in Faisalabad (1997) and Khanewal (1998)
- Genus Thyene
  - Thyene imperialis (previously Phidippus punjabensis) - found in various localities of central Punjab
- Genus Chrysilla
  - Chrysilla volupe - Margalla hills, Islamabad
  - Chrysilla albens

== Family Scytodidae ==
- Genus Scytodes
  - Scytodes thoracica - found in Faisalabad (1996)

== Family Uloboridae ==
- Genus Uloborus
  - Uloborus plumipes - found in Lahore (1935) and Faisalabad, Jhang, Khanewal and Layyah (1996)

== See also ==
- List of butterflies of Pakistan
