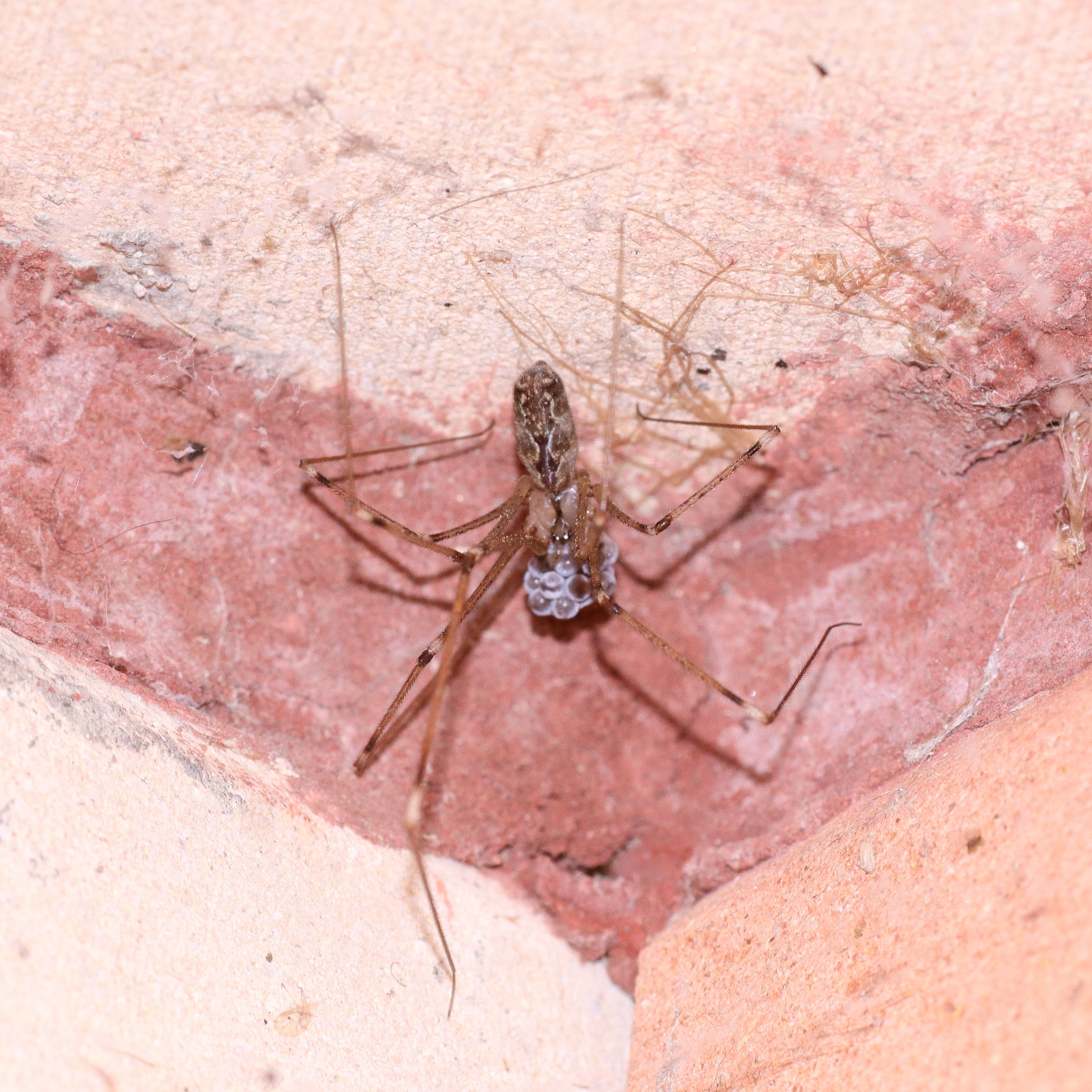
- A marbled cellar spider female (Holocnemus pluchei) with eggsac.
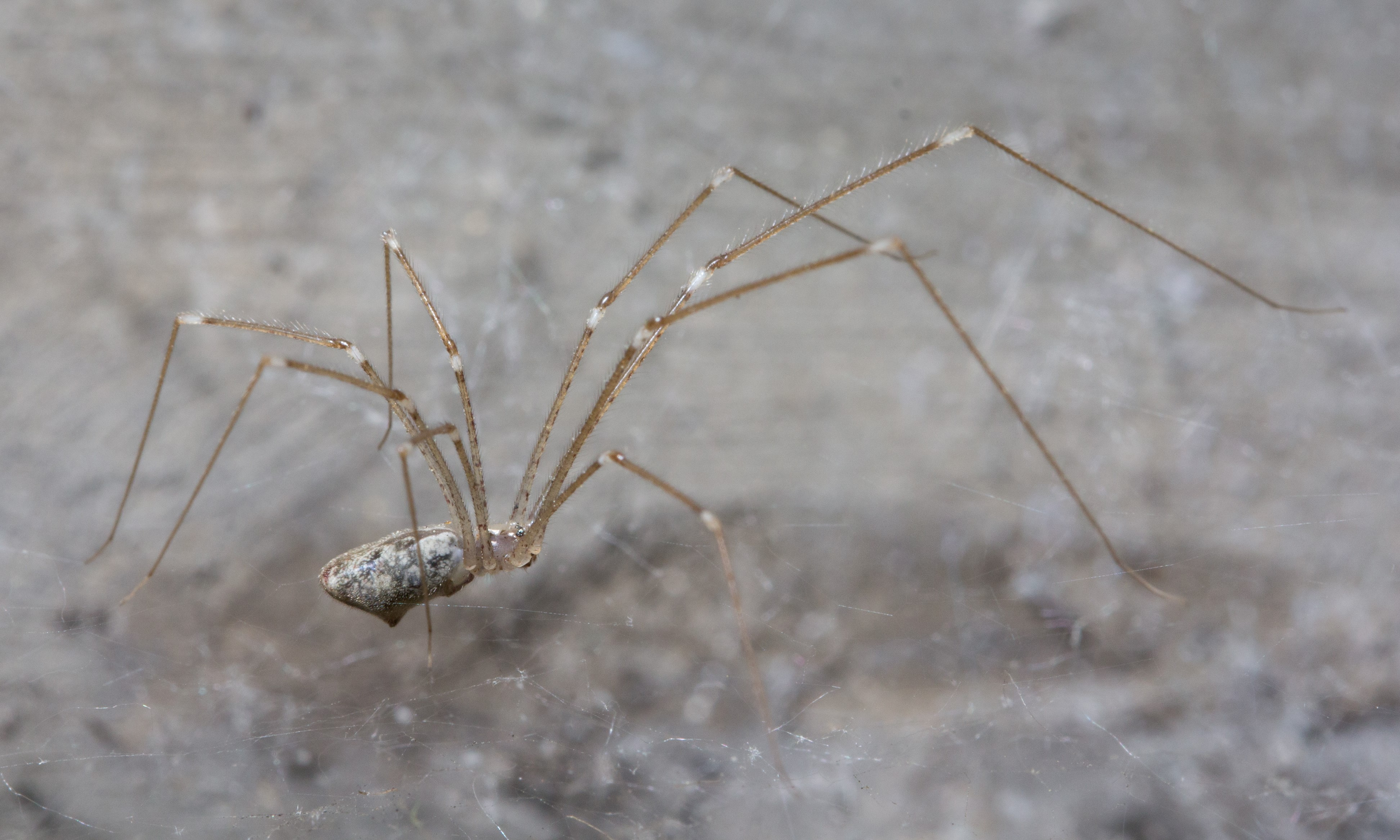
- Holocnemus hispanicus on its web.

Scientific classification
- Kingdom: Animalia
- Phylum: Arthropoda
- Subphylum: Chelicerata
- Class: Arachnida
- Order: Araneae
- Infraorder: Araneomorphae
- Family: Pholcidae
- Subfamily: Holocneminae
- Genus: Holocnemus; Simon, 1873

Type species
- H. pluchei (Scopoli, 1763)

Species
- See text.

= Holocnemus =

Genus of spiders

Holocnemus is a genus of cellar spiders that was first described by Eugène Louis Simon in 1873.

== Distribution ==
Members of this genus are found in Europe and North Africa, with H. pluchei having been introduced worldwide.

== Characteristics ==
The males and females of this genus along with Crossopriza, Stygopholcus and Maghreba are characterized by dark marks on the leg femora and tibiae.

== Species ==
As of October 2025, this genus includes four species:

- Holocnemus caudatus (Dufour, 1820) – Portugal, Spain, Andorra, Morocco
- Holocnemus hispanicus Wiehle, 1933 – Portugal, Spain
- Holocnemus pluchei (Scopoli, 1763) – Europe, North Africa, Turkey, Caucasus, Middle East. Introduced to United States, Argentina, Japan, Australia (type species)
- Holocnemus reini (C. Koch, 1873) – Morocco, Algeria, Tunisia
