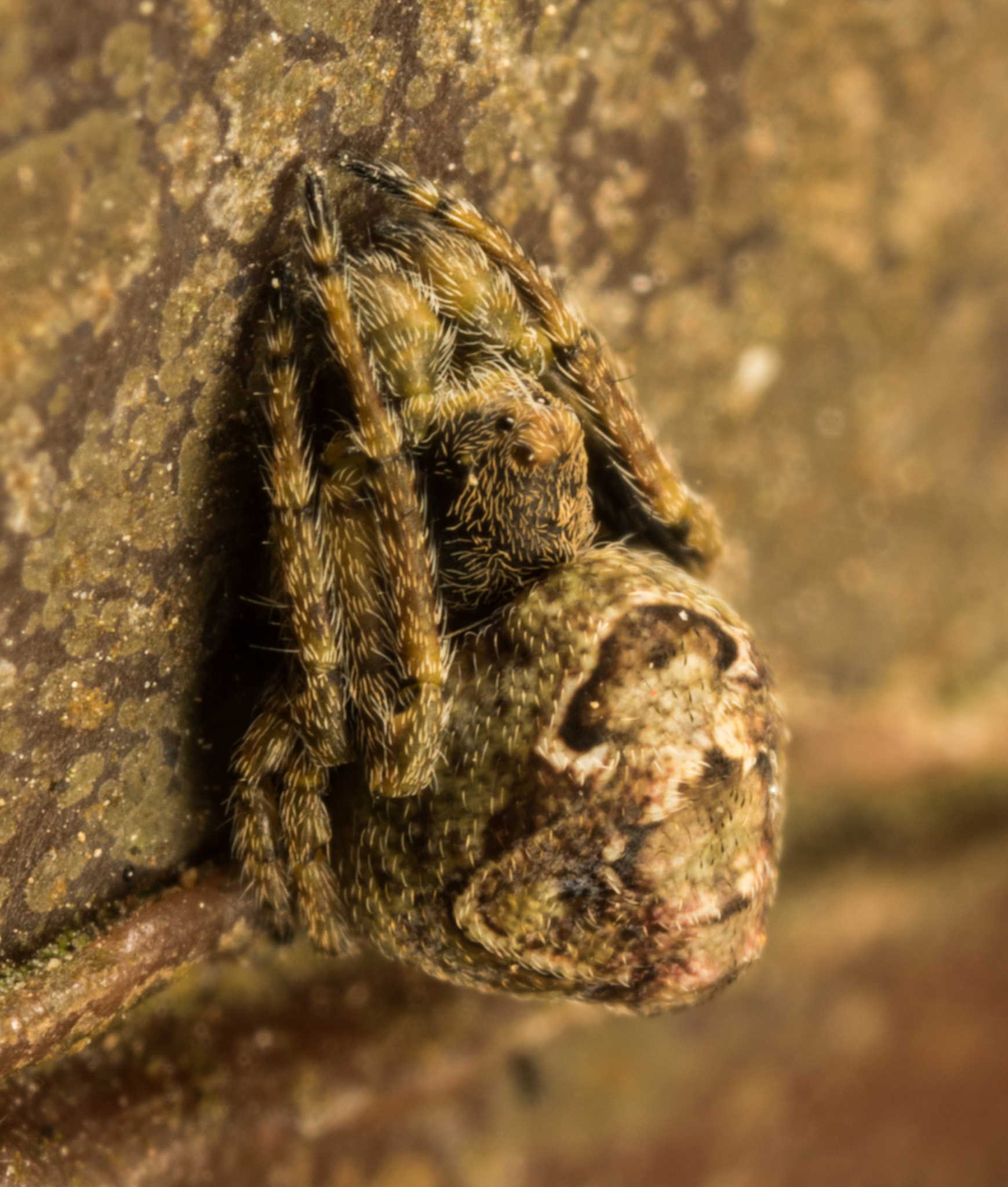
- female from Hong Kong

Scientific classification
- Kingdom: Animalia
- Phylum: Arthropoda
- Subphylum: Chelicerata
- Class: Arachnida
- Order: Araneae
- Infraorder: Araneomorphae
- Family: Araneidae
- Genus: Eriovixia
- Species: E. nigrimaculata

Binomial name
- Eriovixia nigrimaculata Han & Zhu, 2010

= Eriovixia nigrimaculata =

Species of spider

Eriovixia nigrimaculata is a species of orb-weaver spider of the genus Eriovixia. It is endemic to China (Hainan Island).

== Distribution ==
E. nigrimaculata has been recorded from Hainan Island in southern China.

== Habitat ==
The species inhabits tropical forests and has been found among shrubs and trees in mountainous regions of Hainan Island. Like other members of the genus Eriovixia, it constructs orb webs to capture prey and exhibits cryptic behavior during daylight hours, often mimicking dry foliage to avoid predation.

== Description ==
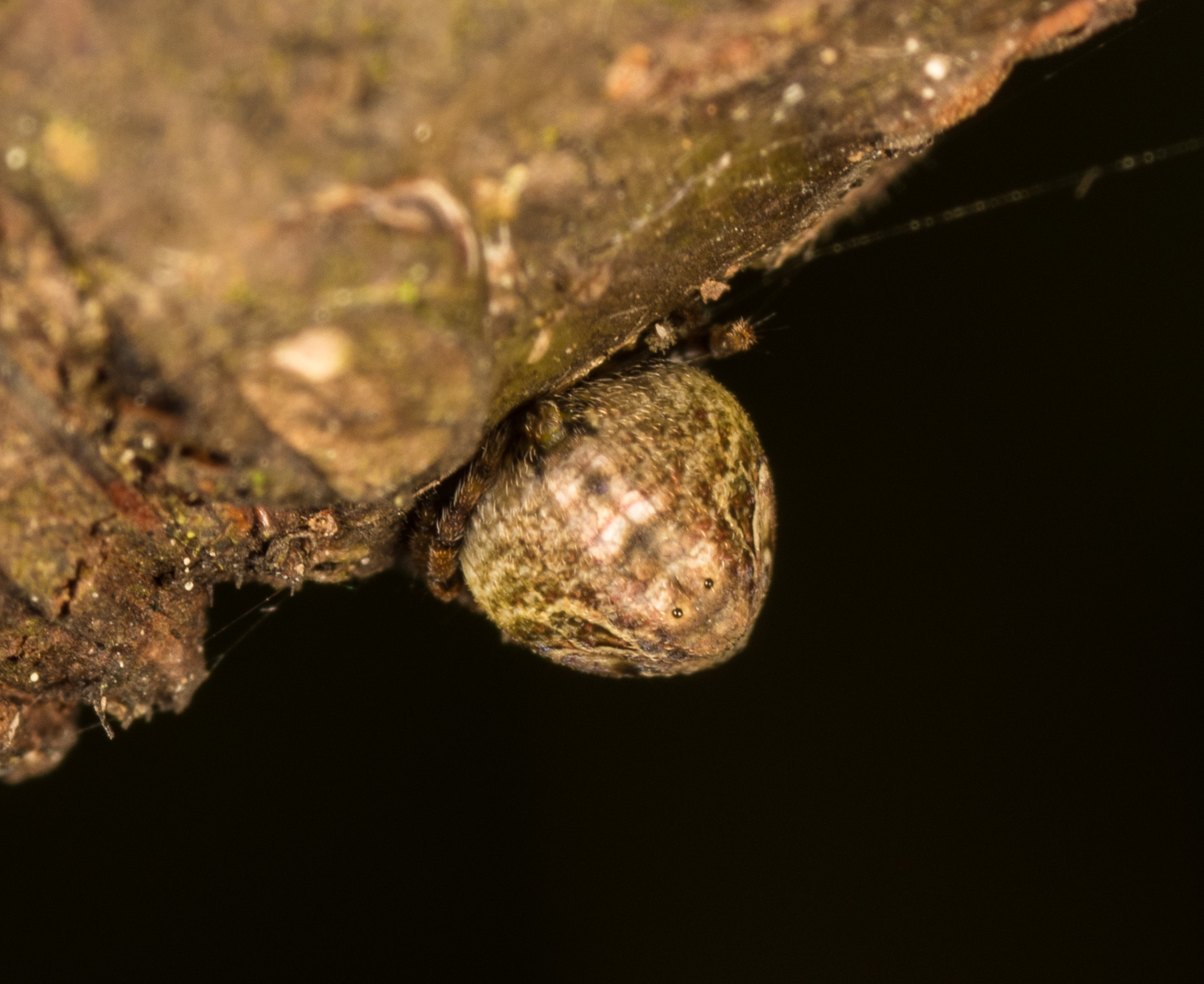
female in Hong Kong

E. nigrimaculata is a small to medium-sized spider. The holotype male measures 3.43 mm in total length, with the carapace 1.65 mm long and 1.21 mm wide, while the abdomen is 1.78 mm long and 1.64 mm wide.

The carapace is dark brown with a narrowing cephalic area and strongly projecting median ocular area. The abdomen is dorsally yellowish grey and bears a conspicuous folium (leaf-like pattern) margined with black, with the posterior end featuring tubercles and small black humps. The chelicerae are yellowish grey with four promarginal and two retromarginal teeth.

Females are slightly larger than males, with the paratype female measuring 3.94 mm in total length. The female carapace is 1.42 mm long and 1.27 mm wide, while the abdomen is 2.52 mm long and wide. The female's epigynum features a long scape that narrows distally and round spermathecae.

The species can be distinguished from the related Eriovixia laglaizei by its narrower epigynal scape, round spermathecae, and the male's thin embolus with a large, bifurcate median apophysis.

== Etymology ==
The specific name "nigrimaculata" refers to the presence of large folium and black margins on the abdomen in both sexes.
