= Box spider =

Box spider can refer to:

- Crossopriza lyoni, the tailed cellar spider
- Gasteracantha cancriformis, the jewel box spider
