= Stygopholcus absoloni =

Scientific classification
- Domain: Eukaryota
- Kingdom: Animalia
- Phylum: Arthropoda
- Subphylum: Chelicerata
- Class: Arachnida
- Order: Araneae
- Infraorder: Araneomorphae
- Family: Pholcidae
- Genus: Stygopholcus
- Species: S. absoloni

Binomial name
- Stygopholcus absoloni (Kulczynski, 1914)

Species of spider

Stygopholcus absoloni is a cellar spider species found in Croatia and Bosnia-Herzegovina.

== See also ==
- List of Pholcidae species
