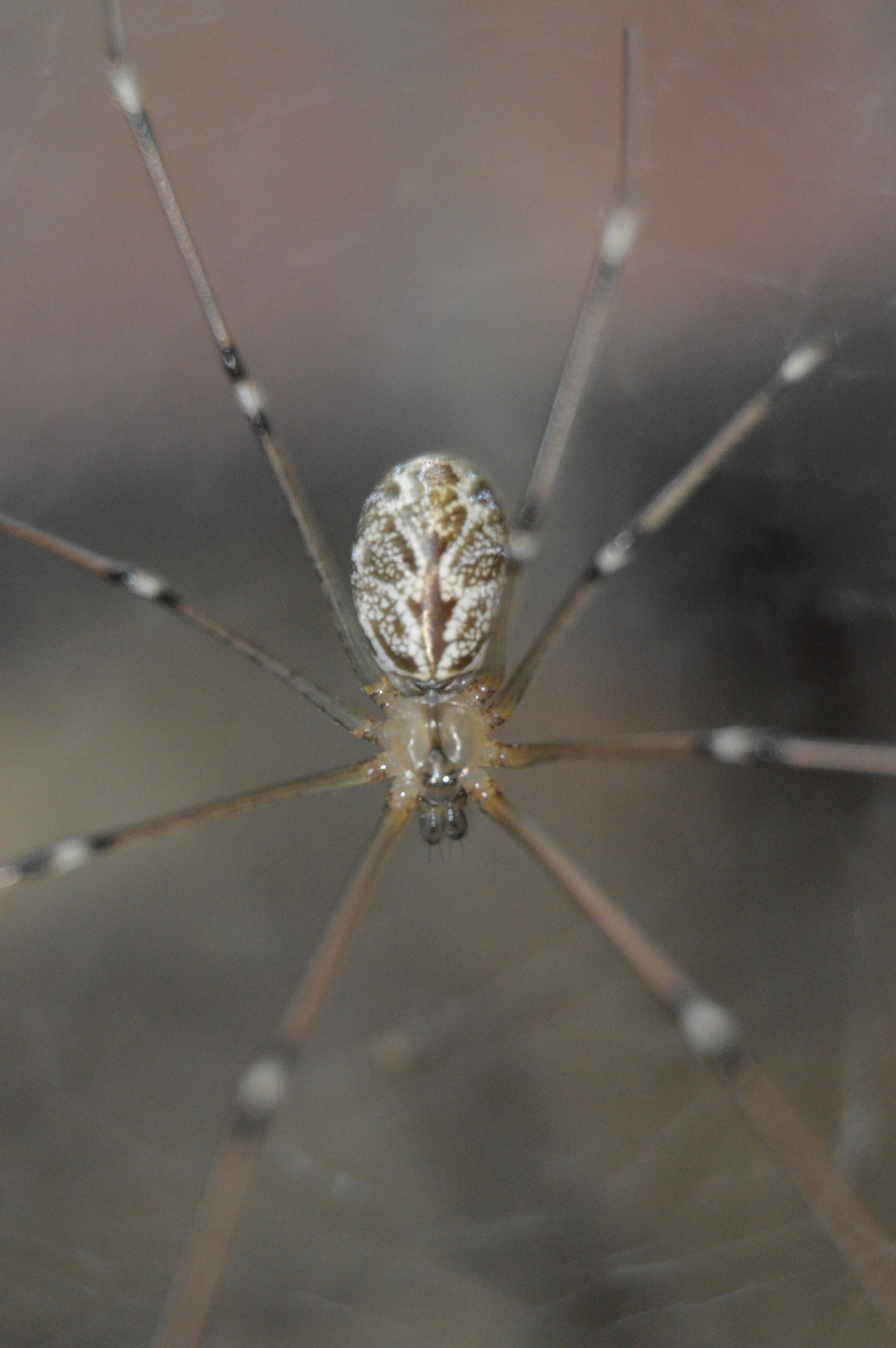
- Holocnemus pluchei in Fort Worth, TX

Scientific classification
- Kingdom: Animalia
- Phylum: Arthropoda
- Subphylum: Chelicerata
- Class: Arachnida
- Order: Araneae
- Infraorder: Araneomorphae
- Family: Pholcidae
- Genus: Holocnemus
- Species: H. pluchei

Binomial name
- Holocnemus pluchei (Scopoli, 1763)

Synonyms
- Aranea pluchei

= Holocnemus pluchei =

Species of spider

Holocnemus pluchei, commonly known as the marbled cellar spider, is a species of Pholcidae, a family commonly referred to as "cellar spiders" or "daddy long-legs". This species is distributed across the North Pacific region of the United States, as well as in parts of North Africa, Europe, Australia, and the Mediterranean. It is considered a common household spider and builds its nest in attics, basements, and eaves of houses. Although some members of the species live in solitary webs, the majority join already existing webs and migrate to new webs multiple times throughout the course of their lives. A unique feature of H. pluchei is that while in many species of spiders, stridulation commonly occurs by males during sexual encounters, in H. pluchei, females also possess stridulatory organs, and both sexes engage in stridulation.

== Description ==
Males and females of the species are approximately the same size, with males ranging between 5–7 mm and females ranging between 5-7.5 mm. H. pluchei have long fragile legs with black and white circles around the joints. Immature members of the species resemble adults. Females have swollen pedipalps that resemble the pedipalps of a male before his final molt. Females also have a sternum projection, which is thought to play an important role in mate selection by improving females' control over copulation. Both females and males have stridulatory organs of the type where the pedipalp rubs against the chelicera, and no morphological differences in these organs have been observed between the sexes.

== Phylogeny ==
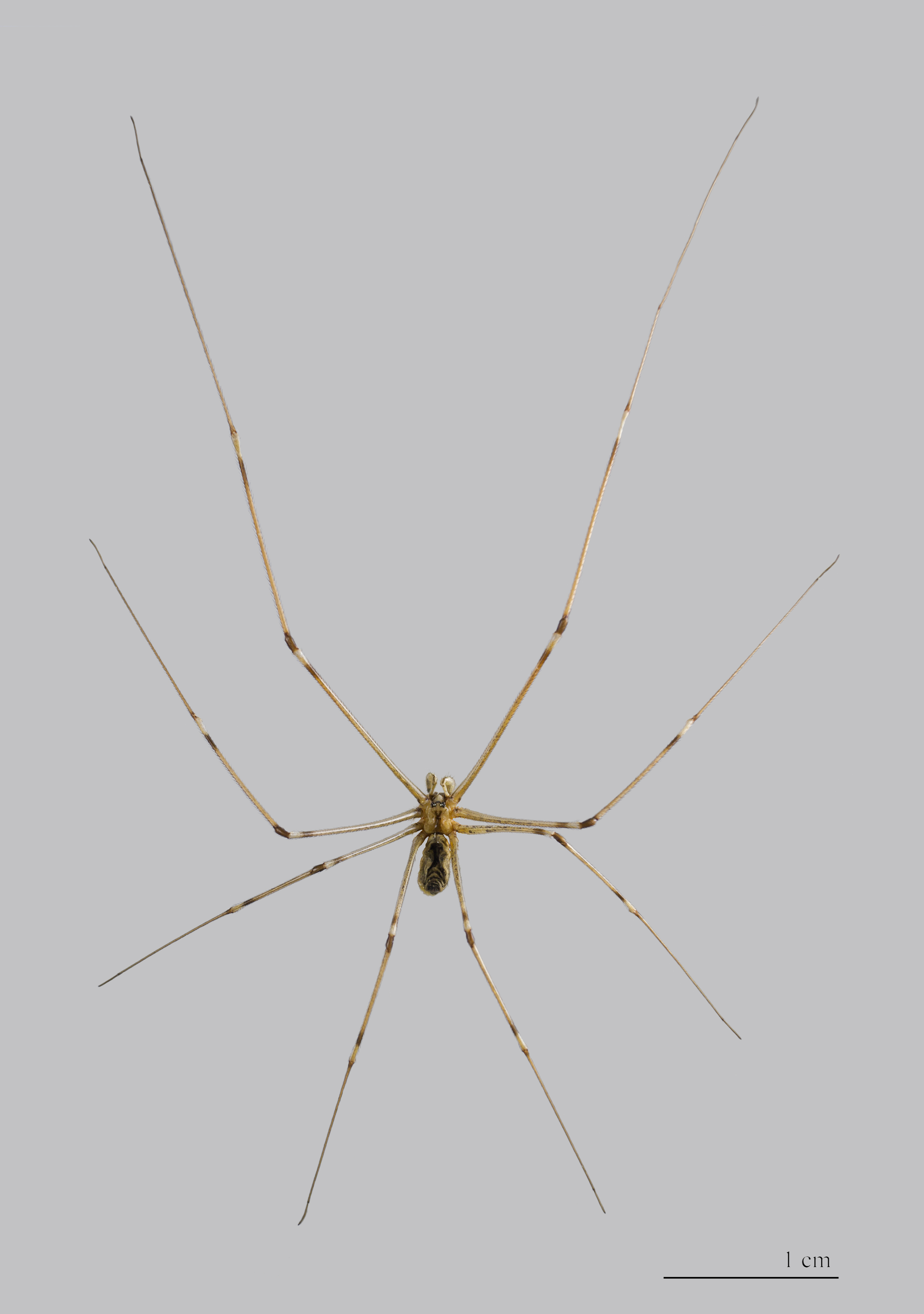
Holocnemus pluchei, museum specimen

Holocnemus pluchei belongs to the family Pholcidae, which contains over 1800 species, including multiple types of "daddy long-legs". Within this family, H. pluchei belongs to the genus Holocnemus, which contains just two other species, H. caudatus, found in Spain and Sicily, and H. hispanicus, found in Spain.

== Habitat and distribution ==
The marbled cellar spider is native to the Mediterranean area of Europe and Northern Africa. It may have been introduced to the North Pacific region of the United States in the mid-1900s. It is now commonly found in Southern California, and is considered an urban pest. It is also found in southern parts of Western Australia. It builds its web under rocks, in basements, or on walls of buildings. This species primarily inhabits warm terrain, spaces below rocks, caves, and basement areas.

== Diet ==
Holocnemus pluchei prey on various species of insects, including fruit flies, houseflies, and damselflies. Some members of the species live in groups, and although this incurs an additional cost of decreased food per spider, it also allows each spider to expend less energy in producing silk for the web.

In a group setting, size determines prey consumption, as the largest spider that detects the prey wins the prey about 80% of the time. Because food is limited in a natural habitat, increased food level significantly decreases development time of the spider from egg to adult and increases size, especially in males. This allows larger males to have a competitive advantage when stealing food from females' webs. For females, however, the extra molt that they sometimes undergo when the food supply is low increases their size. Since larger individuals often steal food from smaller individuals, females that were raised under low-food conditions have a competitive advantage.

== Webs ==
H. pluchei build two types of webs, curved prey-capture sheets to capture prey and dome-shaped webs. Dome-shaped webs are built by egg-carrying members of the species. They completely surround the female and the eggs in a spherical structure and are attached to branches or the side of buildings. Once the eggs hatch, the female exits the dome and the spiderlings remain until their first molt. The spiderlings then either construct their own prey-capture sheet web or join an already existing one.

Holocnemus pluchei move to new webs frequently throughout their lifespan, making it difficult to follow an individual over the course of its life.

== Reproduction and life cycle ==
=== Fertilization ===
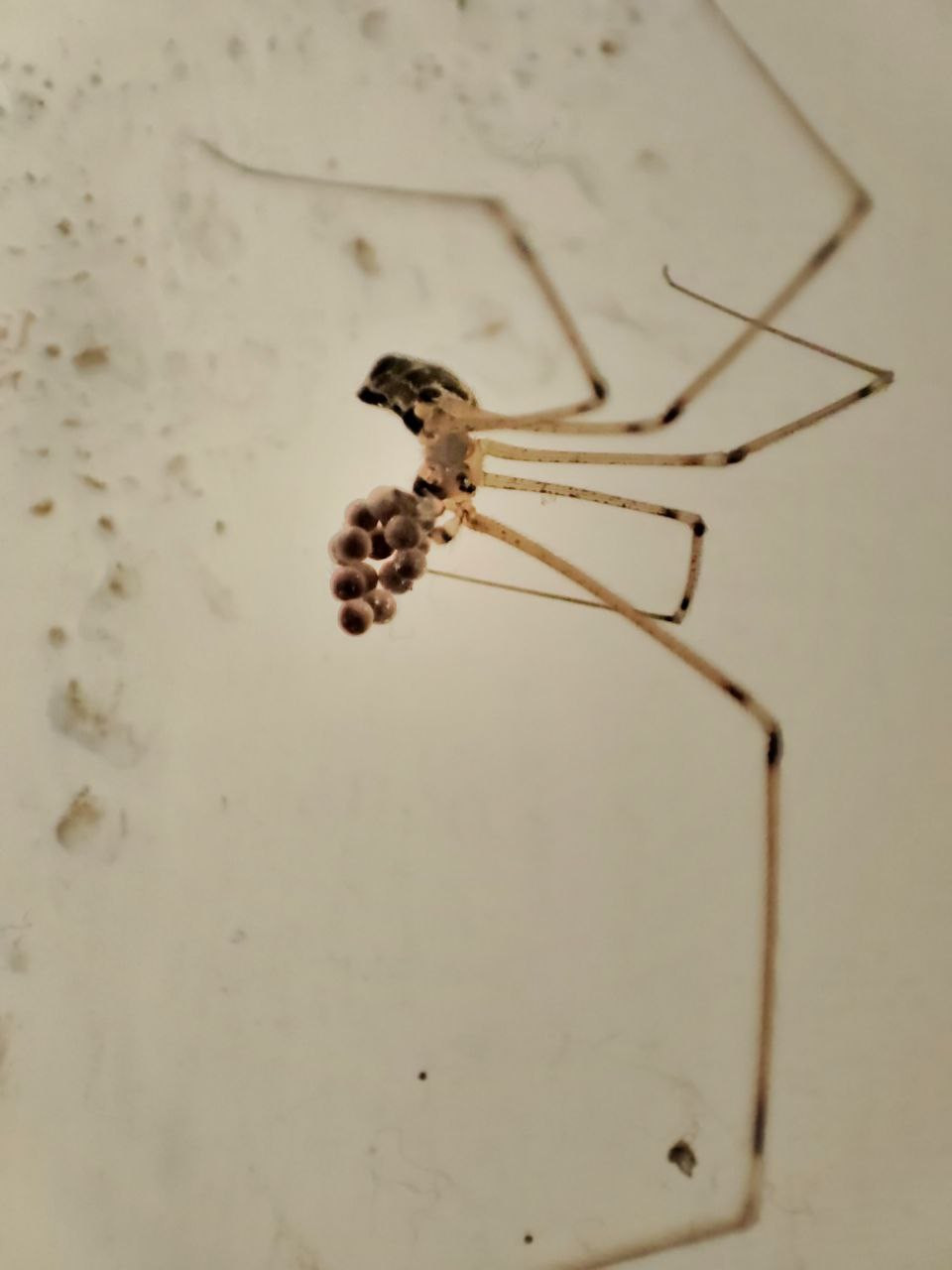
Female carrying the egg sac in her fangs

During fertilization, the female's projecting sternum interacts with the male's clypeus specifically during sperm transfer, indicating that, rather than having a stridulatory purpose, the female's sternum instead plays a role in sexual selection. This interaction may allow the female to exert some level of control over the copulatory actions of the male, since contact has been observed specifically when the male exerts genital pressure on the female during sperm transfer. The projecting sternum may act as a mating filter and selective pressure on the males, allowing only those males who are still able to transfer sperm despite the physical constraint of the sternum. Females tend to mate multiple times, and the second male has a higher likelihood of reproductive success, fertilizing 65-82% of the female's eggs.

Once fertilized, the female carries the egg sac in her fangs while waiting for the spiderlings to hatch. Females do not feed during this time and instead devote their energy to guarding the egg sac from predators.

=== Brood size ===
Each brood contains approximately fifty spiderlings. In addition, although it is difficult to follow individuals in the field due to web migration, females occasionally produce multiple clutches over their lifetime, sometimes as soon as two months after the successful hatching of the first brood.

=== Molting ===
During development, spiderlings normally undergo five molts, with females more likely to undergo a sixth molt than males and poorly fed individuals more likely to undergo a sixth molt than well-fed individuals.

=== Lifespan ===
Although the lifespan of H. pluchei has been difficult to track due to web migration, individuals raised in the lab can have a lifespan of up to one year. Males' lifespan in a natural habitat is often terminated prematurely by various environmental conditions, so a faster rate of development for males often yields a higher rate of reproductive success.

== Mating ==
=== Stridulations ===
Unlike in many other species of spiders, both males and females of H. pluchei possess stridulatory organs, with the females possessing comparatively thicker pedipalp segments. Stridulations in males of many spider species play a role in courtship, and although H. pluchei female stridulations also play a role in courtship, they may indicate aggressive or preventative behavior. When females copulate with males immediately and willingly, they do not stridulate. Stridulation only occurs in cases where the female is less receptive towards the male's advances, often leading to an unsuccessful mating attempt by the male. Females can also regulate mate choice through their sternum projections, which serve as filters by limiting male success during sperm transfer.

=== Male/female feeding interactions ===
Although other species in the family Pholcidae exhibit "chivalrous" behavior, in which the male will step aside to cede prey to the female or wrap up the prey and bring it to her, this behavior does not occur in H. pluchei. In contrast, males of H. pluchei often enter females' webs for the purpose of aggressively stealing food. In competitive interactions over prey, males tend to lose interactions only when they are smaller than their competitor. This, as well as a lack of wrapping or exchanging of the prey, indicates a lack of chivalrous behavior on the part of the male. For males in other species of Pholcidae, chivalrous behavior may induce a female to mate, thereby increasing the male's reproductive success. Since the first male that mates with the female H. pluchei is unlikely to be the one to fertilize her eggs, there may not be as great of an advantage to engaging in chivalrous behavior.

== Social behavior ==
=== Group living ===
Spiderlings can choose to join a group web or build their own web, with the majority of individuals choosing to live in a group. They make this decision when they are 4–5 days old. Each strategy has its own costs and benefits, as group living decreases the amount of food allocated to each spider but also decreases the amount of silk each spider must produce, benefitting individuals by demanding less energy expenditure. Although spiders in groups tend to have smaller abdomens than those living alone, indicating lower foraging success, spiders live in groups more often than would be predicted by chance. This may be due to the high energetic cost of producing silk and increased amount of silk needed to build a web alone as opposed to within a group. An individual's decision to build its own web or join a group web is based on its level of recent feeding success.

H. pluchei spiderlings co-inhabiting a web do not cooperate in other realms, such as prey capture or wrapping remainders of prey in silk, and instead engage in display and fighting behaviors as they compete for prey, with larger spiders tending to win these fights. These conflicts can sometimes escalate to death, especially when the spiders are of similar sizes. Spiders in the same web will occasionally cooperate on wrapping prey, but only when the prey is very large. This cooperation may only occur because the spiders cannot see each other and are therefore unaware of each other's presence.

== Enemies ==
=== Predators ===
Holocnemus pluchei are preyed upon by jumping spiders of the family Salticidae, including Portia fimbriata and Portia labiata. In response to invasions from other species, H. pluchei will "bounce," or move their legs rapidly up and down while remaining grounded on the web in an attempt to dislodge the intruder. Invading species employ aggressive mimicry tactics when invading the webs of H. pluchei and are often able to avoid setting off the resident's "bouncing" strategy, enabling these web invaders to successfully capture their prey.

== Interactions with humans and livestock ==
Holocnemus pluchei are considered household spiders and build webs in the eaves, basements, and attics of houses. Although they are venomous, they are not dangerous to humans, likely due to the inability of their fangs to produce a strong enough bite.

There has been one case study reported of asthma in a human stemming from an allergy associated with the arginine kinase stretch of a protein within H. pluchei, but no other evidence of harm to humans from this species has been documented.

== See also ==
- List of Pholcidae species
