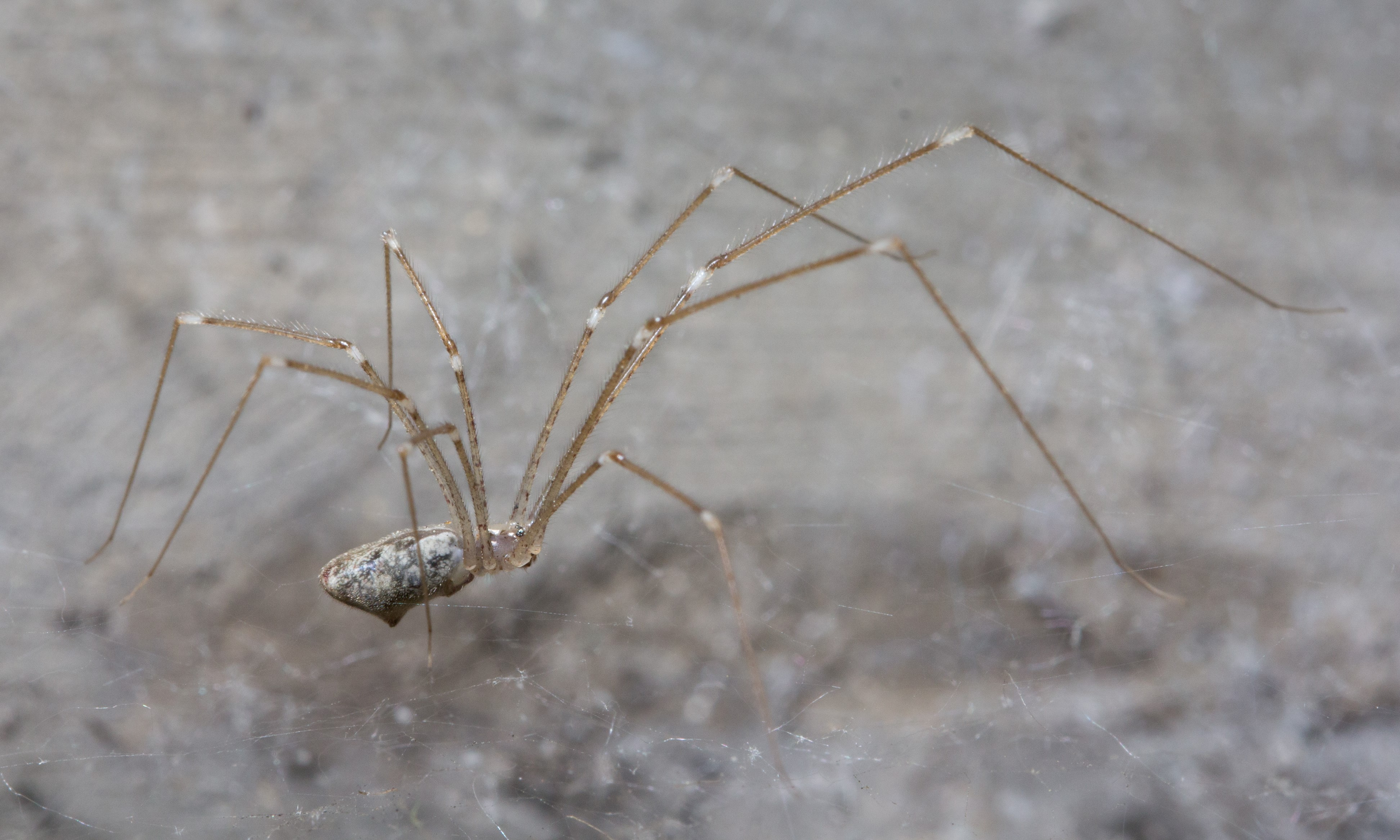

Scientific classification
- Kingdom: Animalia
- Phylum: Arthropoda
- Subphylum: Chelicerata
- Class: Arachnida
- Order: Araneae
- Infraorder: Araneomorphae
- Family: Pholcidae
- Genus: Holocnemus
- Species: H. hispanicus

Binomial name
- Holocnemus hispanicus Wiehle, 1933

= Holocnemus hispanicus =

Species of spider

Holocnemus hispanicus is a cellar spider species found in Spain. It belongs to the genus Holocnemus, which contains only three other species, Holocnemus caudatus,Holocnemus pluchei and Holocnemus reini.

== See also ==
- List of Pholcidae species
