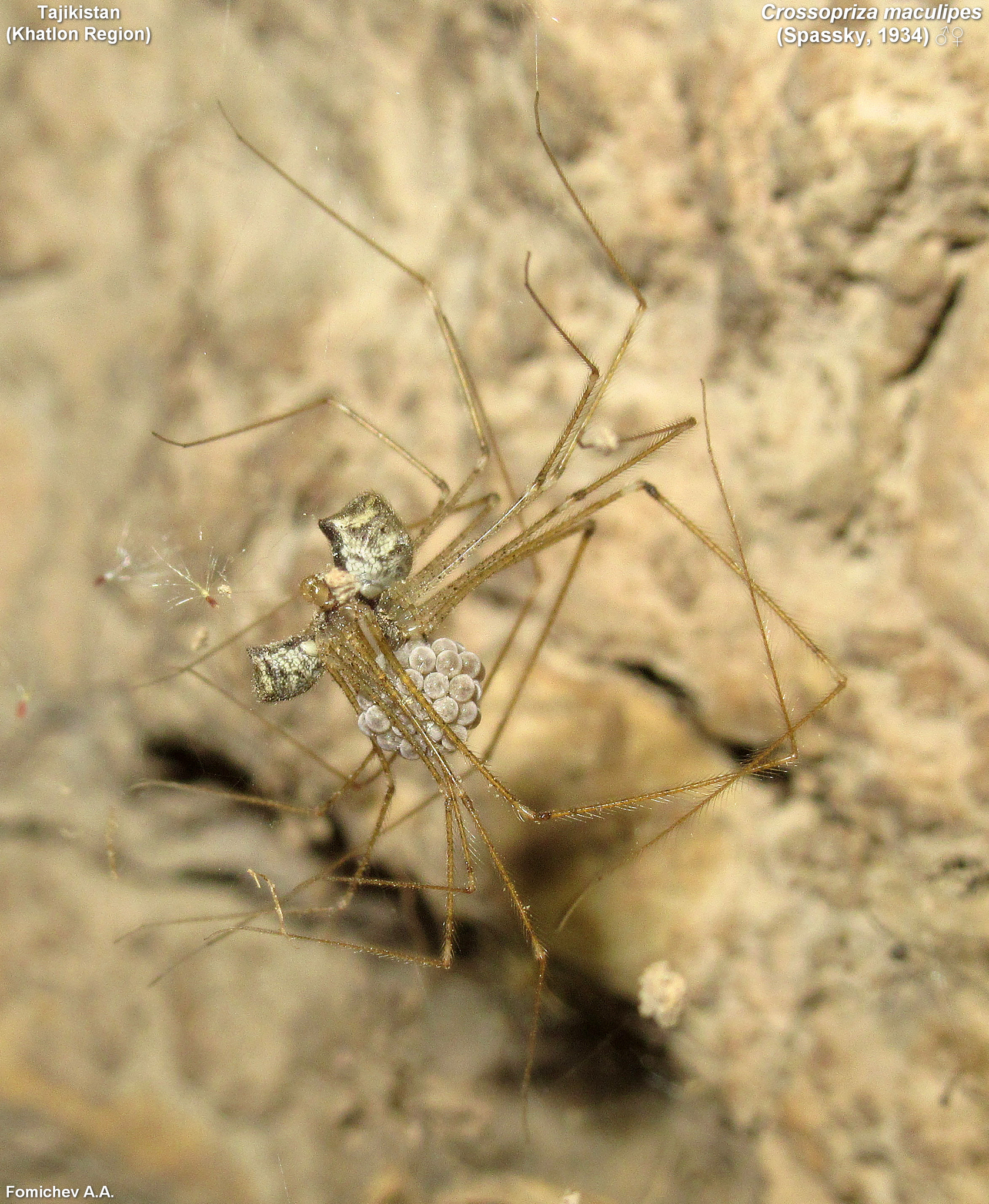
- female with egg sac

Scientific classification
- Kingdom: Animalia
- Phylum: Arthropoda
- Subphylum: Chelicerata
- Class: Arachnida
- Order: Araneae
- Infraorder: Araneomorphae
- Family: Pholcidae
- Genus: Crossopriza
- Species: C. maculipes

Binomial name
- Crossopriza maculipes Spassky, 1934

= Crossopriza maculipes =

Species of cellar spider

Crossopriza maculipes is a species of spider in the family Pholcidae (cellar spiders) native to Iraq, Kazakhstan, Uzbekistan, Turkmenistan, Tajikistan, Afghanistan and Pakistan.
