= Stygopholcus photophilus =

Scientific classification
- Domain: Eukaryota
- Kingdom: Animalia
- Phylum: Arthropoda
- Subphylum: Chelicerata
- Class: Arachnida
- Order: Araneae
- Infraorder: Araneomorphae
- Family: Pholcidae
- Genus: Stygopholcus
- Species: S. photophilus

Binomial name
- Stygopholcus photophilus Senglet, 1971

Species of spider

Stygopholcus photophilus is a cellar spider species found in Greece.

== See also ==
- List of Pholcidae species
