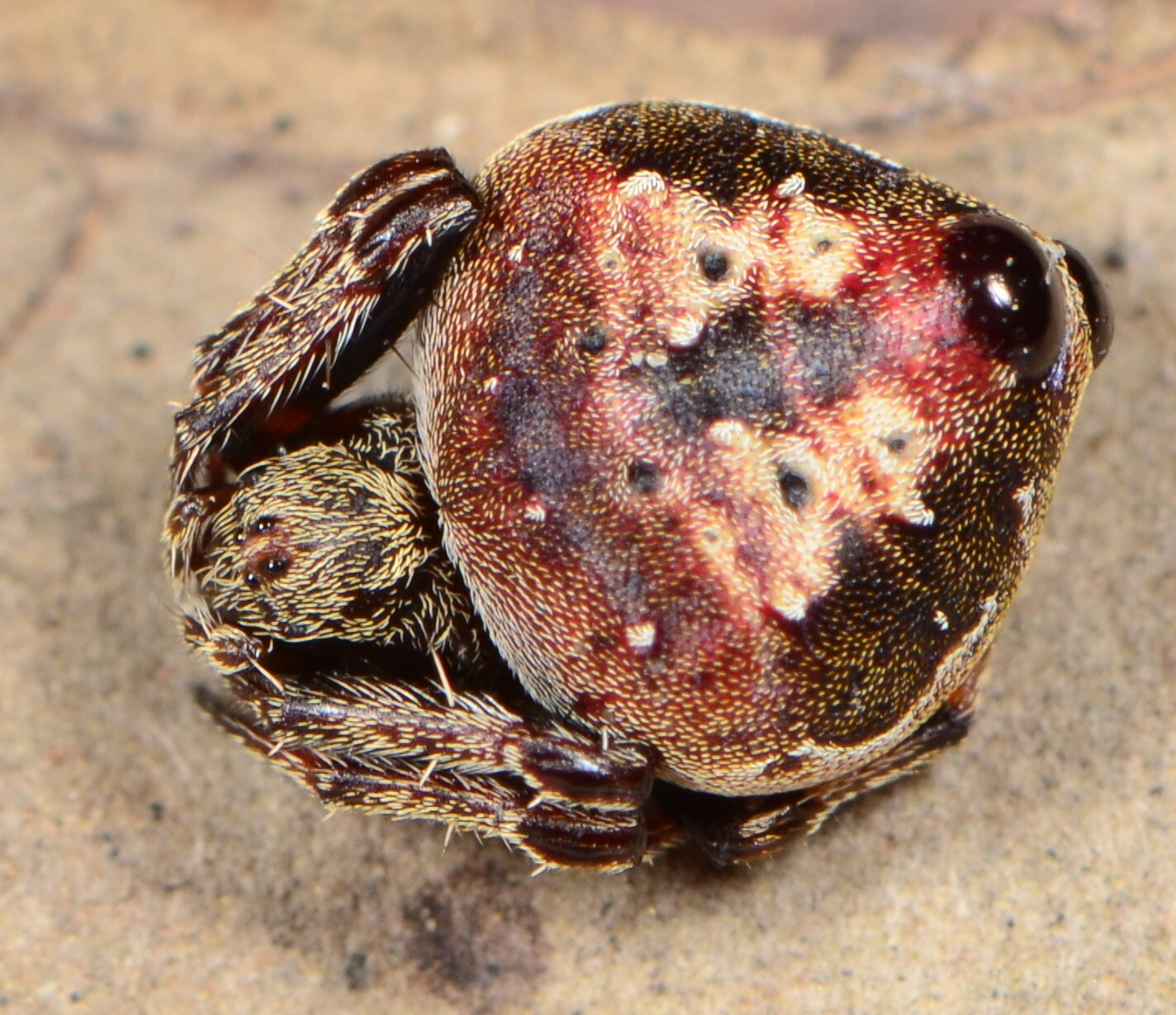
- Female from South Africa
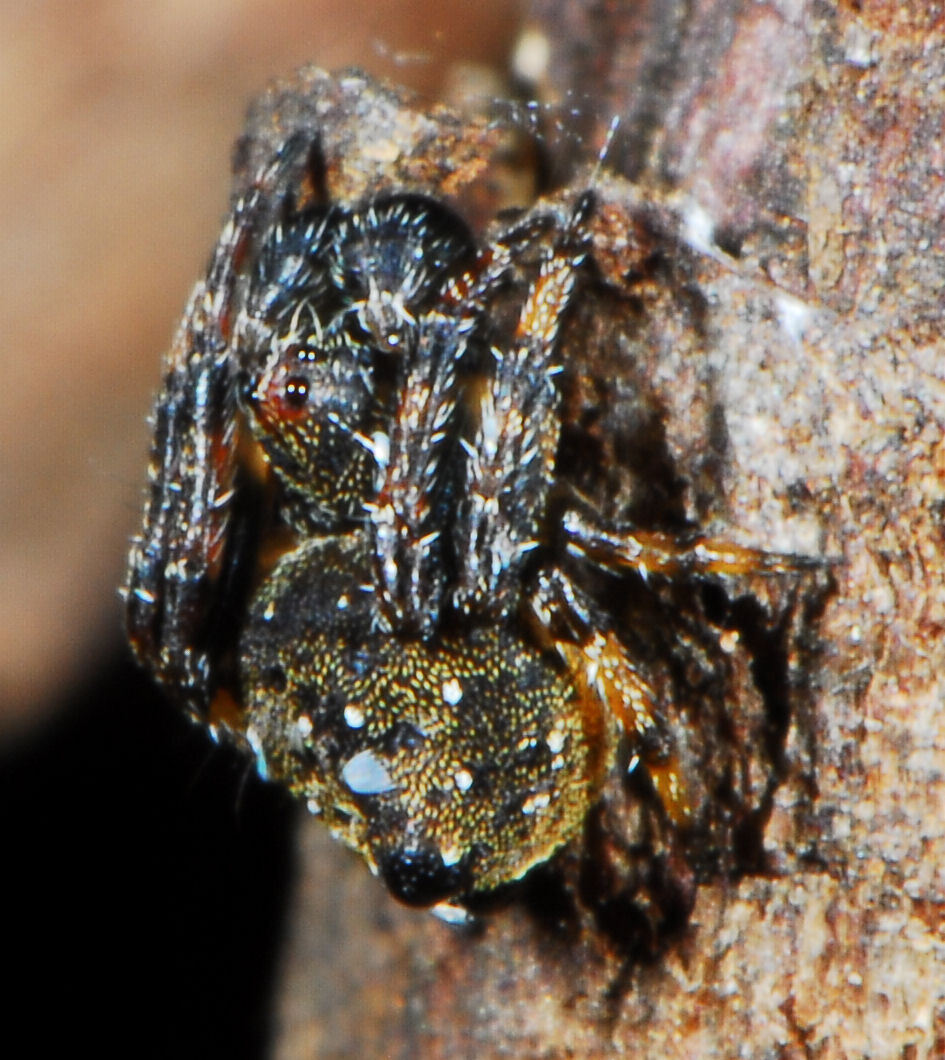
- Male

Scientific classification
- Kingdom: Animalia
- Phylum: Arthropoda
- Subphylum: Chelicerata
- Class: Arachnida
- Order: Araneae
- Infraorder: Araneomorphae
- Family: Araneidae
- Genus: Eriovixia
- Species: E. excelsa

Binomial name
- Eriovixia excelsa (Simon, 1889)

Synonyms
- Glyptogona excelsa Simon, 1889; Araneus excelsus Simon, 1906; Neoscona excelsus (Tikader & Bal, 1981)

= Eriovixia excelsa =

Species of spider

Eriovixia excelsa is a species of orb-weaver spider in the genus Eriovixia. It is widely distributed across Asia and has been introduced to southern Africa.

== Distribution ==
E. excelsa has been recorded from Pakistan, India, Thailand, China, Taiwan, Philippines, and Indonesia. The species has been introduced to South Africa and Eswatini, where it may be considered invasive.

In South Africa, the species has been recorded from four provinces at altitudes ranging from 148 to 1,444 m above sea level.

== Ecology and behavior ==
Eriovixia species are nocturnal, dismantling their webs in the morning and rebuilding them each night. Nocturnal Eriovixia species have poor vision, especially in daylight. They largely rely on mechanoreception and are quite sensitive to air currents, thanks in part to the hairs on their prosoma, which act like whiskers.

Eriovixia excelsa inhabits Grassland and Savanna biomes. The species constructs orb webs between vegetation, typically with a very long bridge line. A notable ecological observation recorded a mimetic relationship between the beetle Cassida calvaria and Eriovixia excelsa at Palmiet Nature Reserve near Durban, where both species showed similar size, colouring and body patterns.

Eriovixia species serve as important biological controls on pest populations, including agricultural pests and those that carry human diseases. Notably, E. excelsa in citrus agroecosystems is a control for crop damaging flies. Research has also shown that silk from Eriovixia species has potential antibacterial effects. This silk can be used to source antibiotics against Streptococcus sp., Pasteurella sp., and Staphylococcus sp.

== Description ==
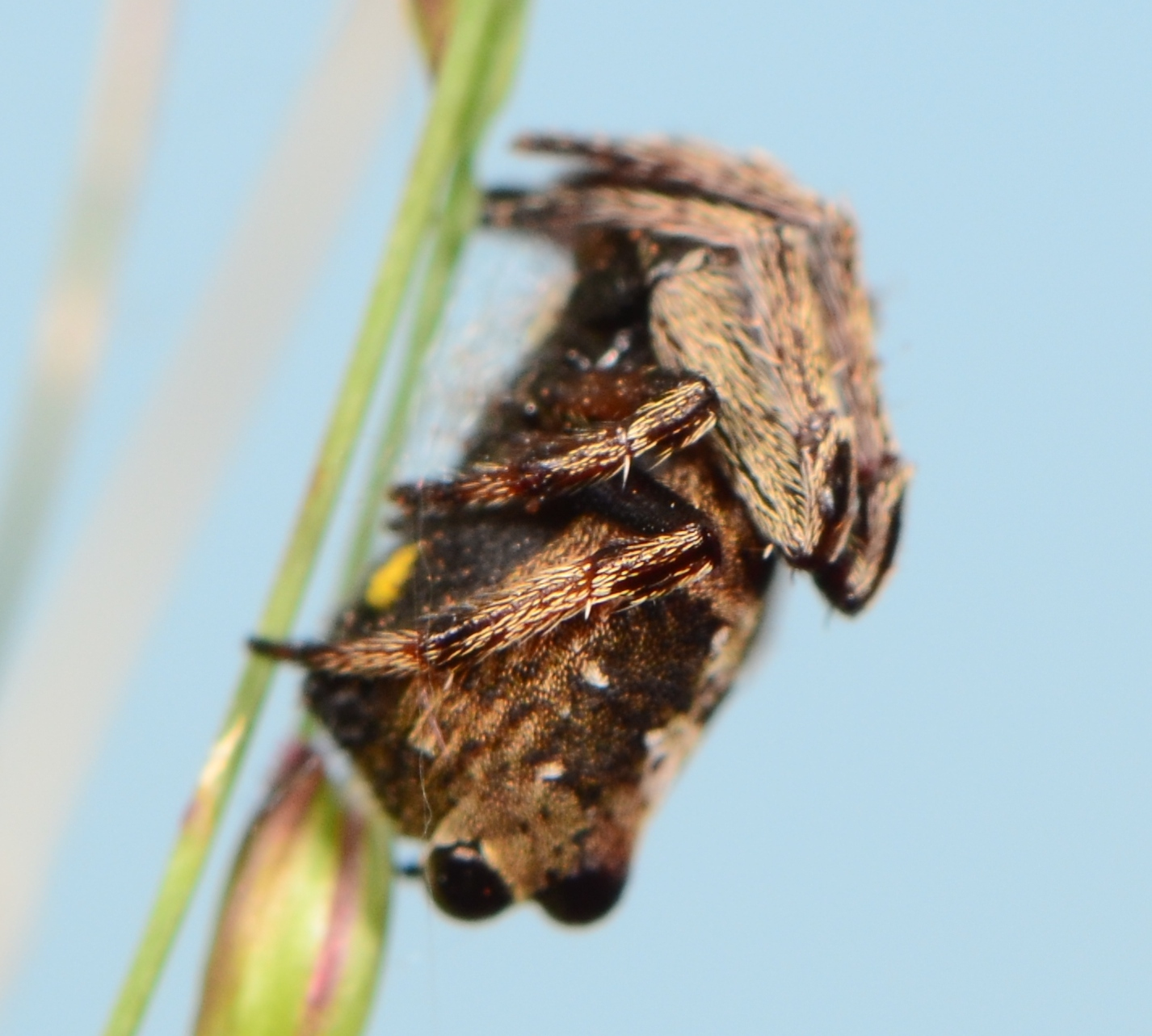
female

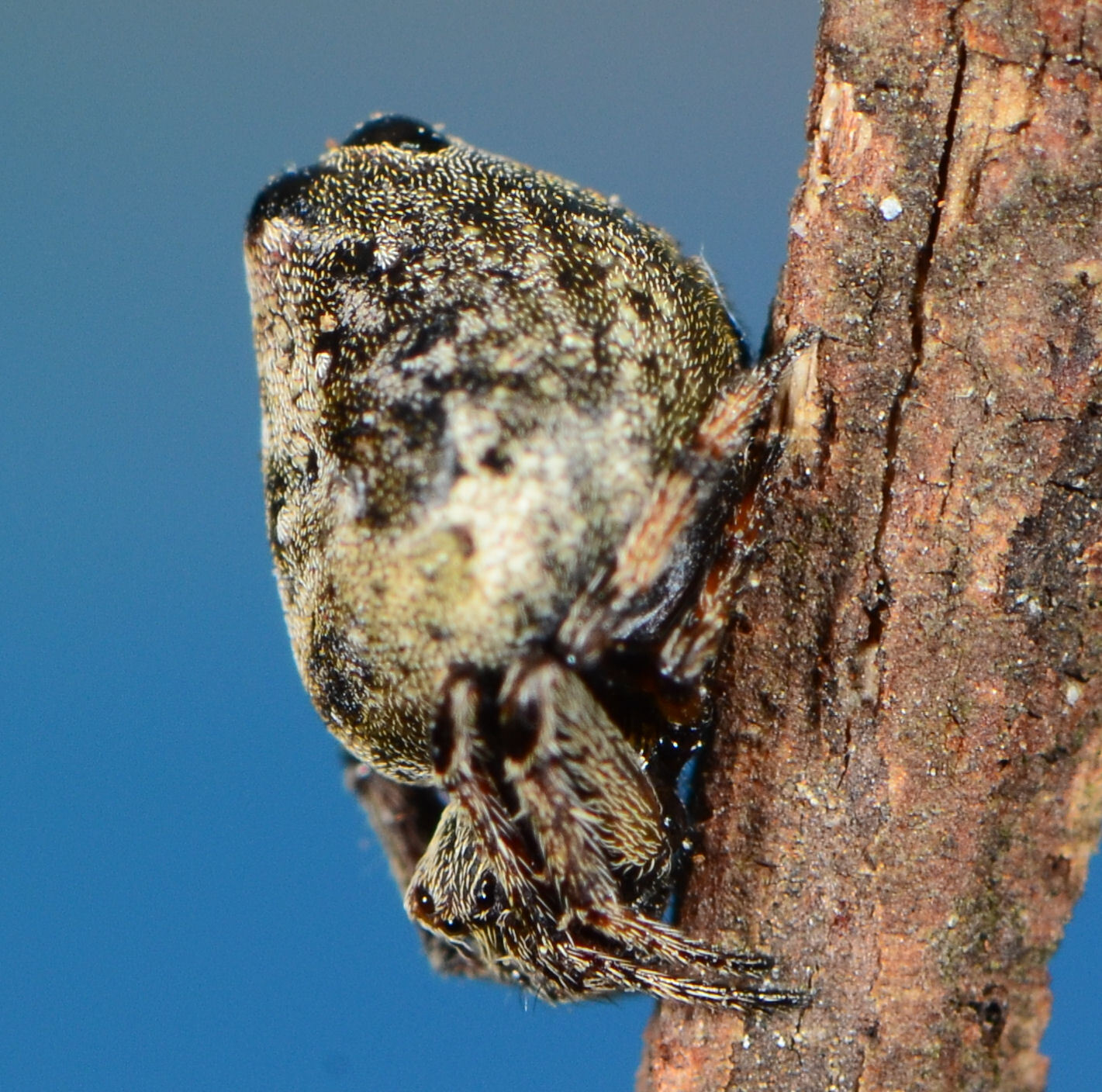
female

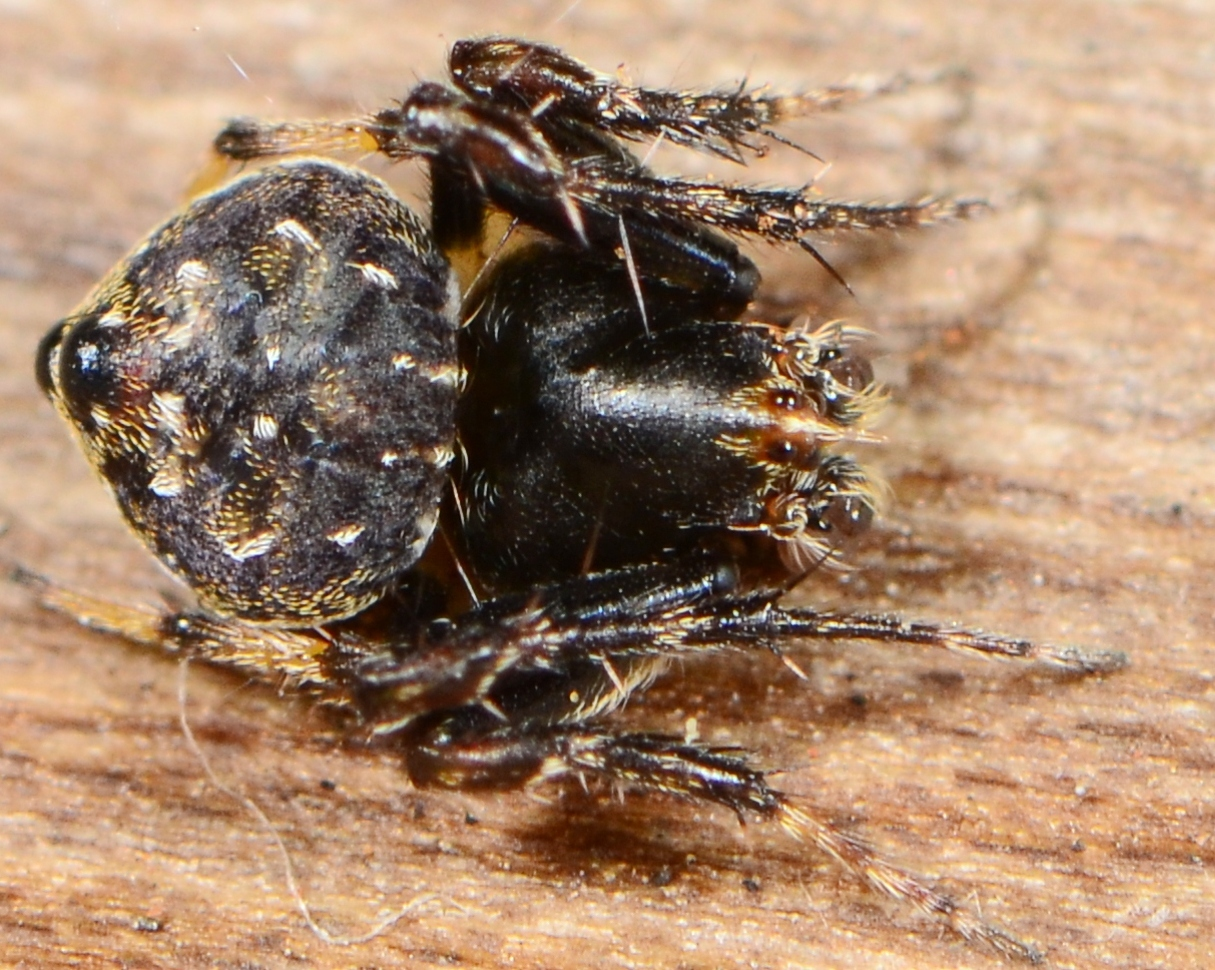
male

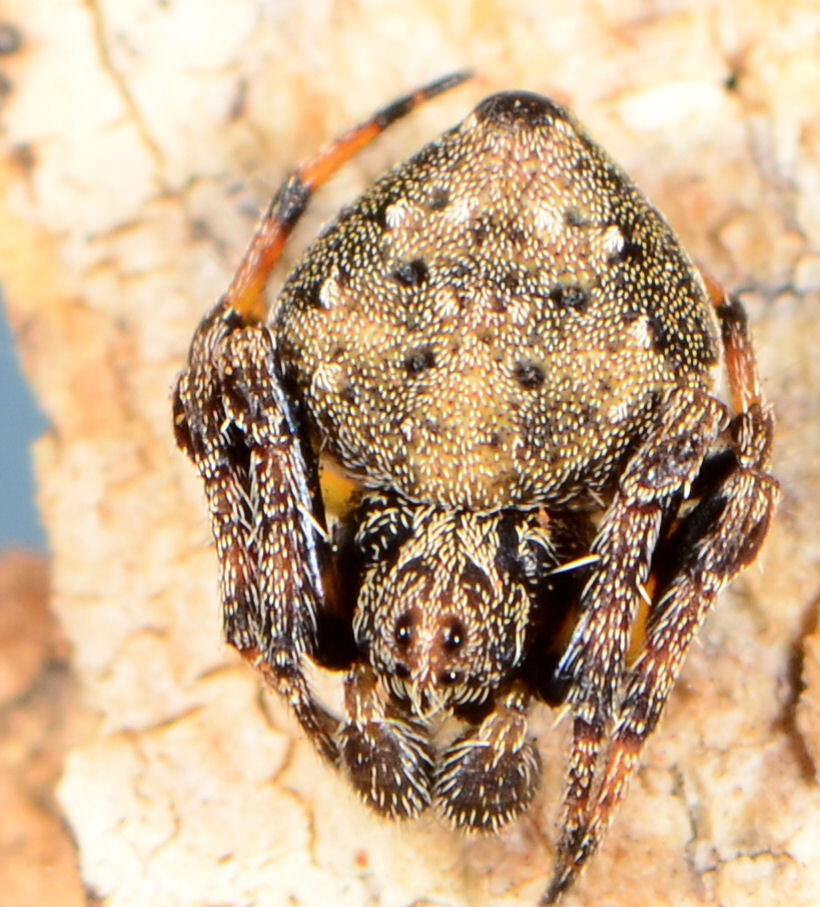
juvenile male

E. excelsa is a small orb-weaver spider, with females measuring approximately 5.5 mm in total length and males around 3.7 mm.

The prosoma of Eriovixia species are covered in long soft hairs, and they have a nearly triangular opisthosoma that tapers posteriorly, as well as spiny legs. Females are typically larger than males, and their epigynum has a short scape fused to curved sclerites that bear two copulatory openings. The abdomen has a characteristic tubercle at its posterior end.

== Taxonomy ==
The species was originally described by Eugène Simon in 1889 as Glyptogona excelsa. It was subsequently transferred to the genus Araneus by Simon himself in 1906, then to Neoscona by Tikader and Bal in 1981, before finally being placed in its current genus Eriovixia by Grasshoff in 1986.
