= Stygopholcus skotophilus =

Scientific classification
- Domain: Eukaryota
- Kingdom: Animalia
- Phylum: Arthropoda
- Subphylum: Chelicerata
- Class: Arachnida
- Order: Araneae
- Infraorder: Araneomorphae
- Family: Pholcidae
- Genus: Stygopholcus
- Species: S. skotophilus

Binomial name
- Stygopholcus skotophilus Kratochvil, 1940

Subspecies
- Stygopholcus skotophilus montenegrinus Kratochvil, 1940 — Montenegro

Species of spider

Stygopholcus skotophilus is a cellar spider species found in Bosnia-Hercegovina and Montenegro.

== See also ==
- List of Pholcidae species
