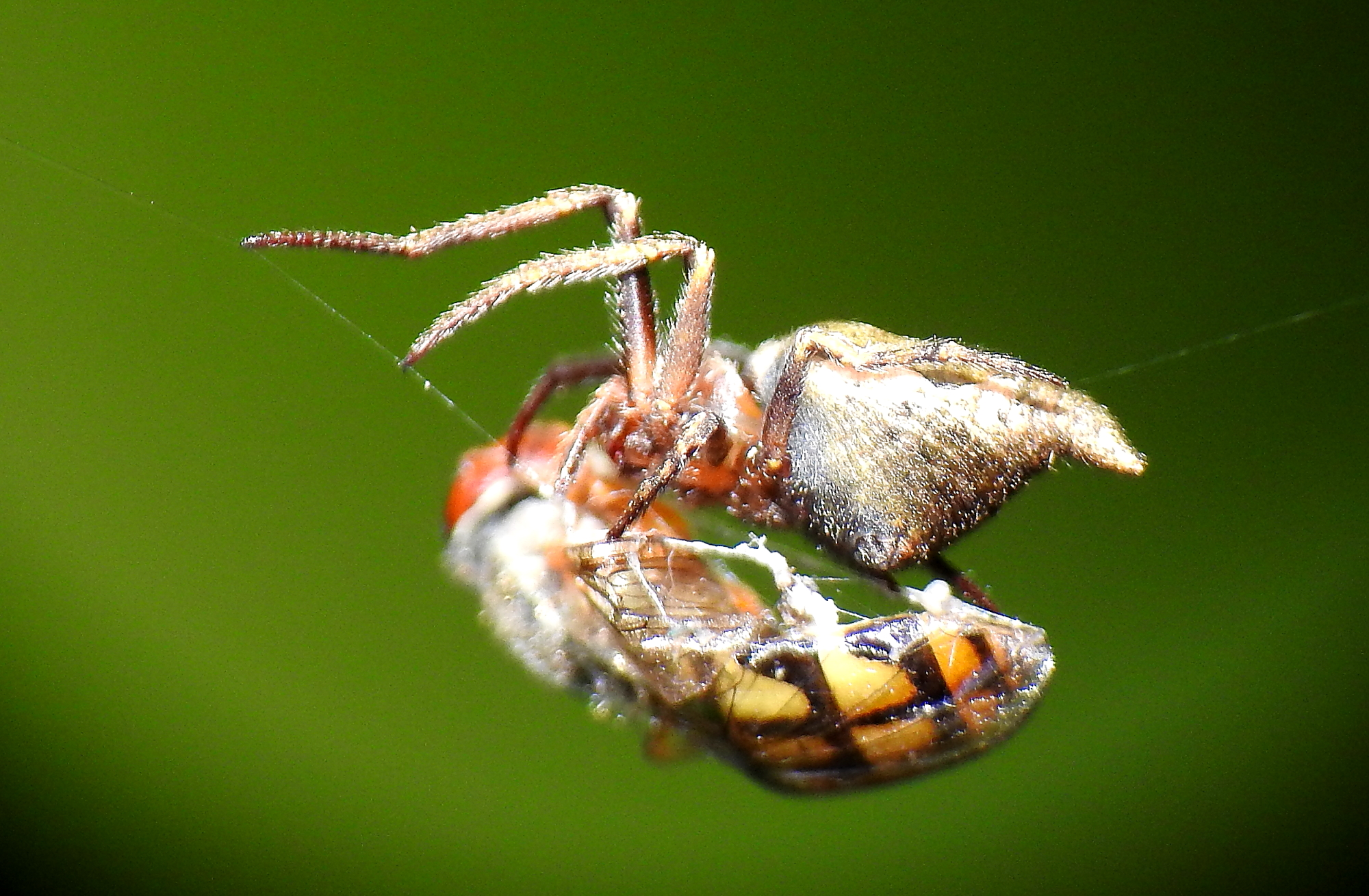

Scientific classification
- Kingdom: Animalia
- Phylum: Arthropoda
- Subphylum: Chelicerata
- Class: Arachnida
- Order: Araneae
- Infraorder: Araneomorphae
- Family: Araneidae
- Genus: Eriovixia
- Species: E. gryffindori

Binomial name
- Eriovixia gryffindori Ahmed, Khalap & Sumukha, 2016

= Eriovixia gryffindori =

Species of spider

Eriovixia gryffindori is a species of spider in the family Araneidae.

The animal belongs to the genus Eriovixia. It was discovered in 2015 in the Indian state of Karnataka by Javed Ahmed, Rajashree Khalap, and Sumukha Javagal. The discoverers of this new spider thought it resembled the Sorting Hat of the Harry Potter series, so they named it after Godric Gryffindor, the original owner of the Sorting Hat.

E. gryffindori is the most recent and possibly the most well-known of the 21 species of the genus Eriovixia. These spiders reside mostly in the tropical regions of Asia. Many species in this genus group are also known for their unconventional appearance. For example, the Orb-weaver spider from Thailand boasts a bright yellow abdomen, while the species E. pseudocentrodes also has a hat-like shape, similar to its cousin.

== Habitat ==
E. gryffindori was discovered in the mountainous Western Ghats region of south-western India.
