= Glyptogona duriuscula =

Scientific classification
- Kingdom: Animalia
- Phylum: Arthropoda
- Subphylum: Chelicerata
- Class: Arachnida
- Order: Araneae
- Infraorder: Araneomorphae
- Family: Araneidae
- Genus: Glyptogona
- Species: G. duriuscula

Binomial name
- Glyptogona duriuscula Simon, 1895

Species of spider

Glyptogona duriuscula, is a species of spider of the genus Glyptogona. It is endemic to Sri Lanka.
