= Holocnemus caudatus =

Scientific classification
- Kingdom: Animalia
- Phylum: Arthropoda
- Subphylum: Chelicerata
- Class: Arachnida
- Order: Araneae
- Infraorder: Araneomorphae
- Family: Pholcidae
- Genus: Holocnemus
- Species: H. caudatus

Binomial name
- Holocnemus caudatus (Dufour, 1820)

Species of spider

Holocnemus caudatus is a cellar spider species found in Spain and Sicily. It belongs to the genus Holocnemus, which contains only two other species, Holocnemus hispanicus and Holocnemus Pluchei.

== See also ==
- List of Pholcidae species
