= Stygopholcus =

Scientific classification
- Kingdom: Animalia
- Phylum: Arthropoda
- Subphylum: Chelicerata
- Class: Arachnida
- Order: Araneae
- Infraorder: Araneomorphae
- Family: Pholcidae
- Genus: Stygopholcus; Absolon & Kratochvíl, 1932

Type species
- S. absoloni (Kulczyński, 1914)

Species
- S. absoloni (Kulczyński, 1914) – Croatia, Bosnia and Herzegovina; S. photophilus Senglet, 1971 – Greece; S. skotophilus Kratochvíl, 1940 – Bosnia and Herzegovina, Montenegro; S. s. montenegrinus Kratochvíl, 1940 – Montenegro

Genus of spiders

Stygopholcus is a genus of Balkan cellar spiders that was first described by K. Absolon & J. Kratochvíl in 1932. As of June 2019 it contains only three species and one subspecies, found in Montenegro, Greece, Bosnia and Herzegovina, and Croatia: S. absoloni, S. photophilus, S. skotophilus, and S. s. montenegrinus.

== See also ==
- List of Pholcidae species
