= Crossopriza pristina =

Scientific classification
- Kingdom: Animalia
- Phylum: Arthropoda
- Subphylum: Chelicerata
- Class: Arachnida
- Order: Araneae
- Infraorder: Araneomorphae
- Family: Pholcidae
- Genus: Crossopriza
- Species: C. pristina

Binomial name
- Crossopriza pristina (Simon, 1890)

Synonyms
- Artema pristina Simon, 1890

Species of spider

Crossopriza pristina is a species of cellar spider, type species of the genus Crossopriza. It was described by Eugène Louis Simon as Artema pristina.
