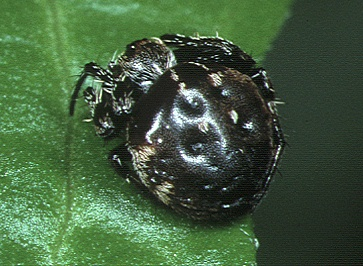
- Female Eriovixia sakiedaorum
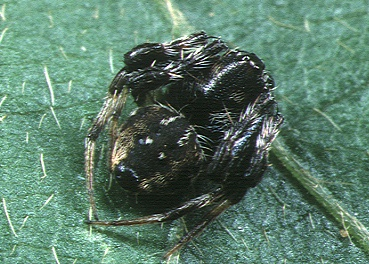
- Male E. sakiedaorum

Scientific classification
- Kingdom: Animalia
- Phylum: Arthropoda
- Subphylum: Chelicerata
- Class: Arachnida
- Order: Araneae
- Infraorder: Araneomorphae
- Family: Araneidae
- Genus: Eriovixia; Archer, 1951

Type species
- E. rhinura (Pocock, 1900)

Species
- 34, see text

Synonyms
- Simonarachne Archer, 1951

= Eriovixia =

Genus of spiders

Eriovixia is a genus of orb-weaver spiders first described by Allan Frost Archer in 1951.

Most species are found from India to the Philippines and Indonesia, with a few species in Africa.

== Species ==
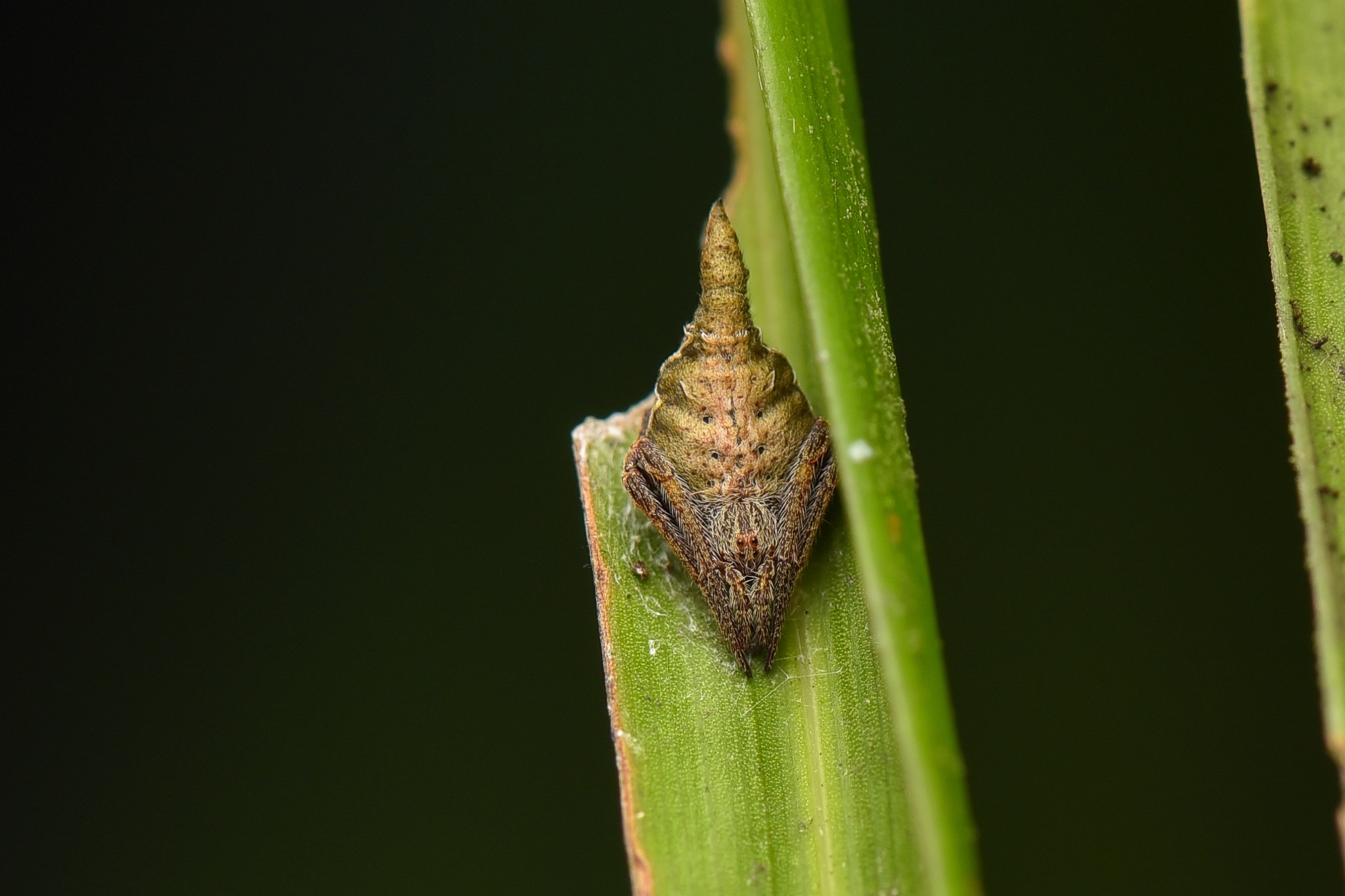
E. gryffindori

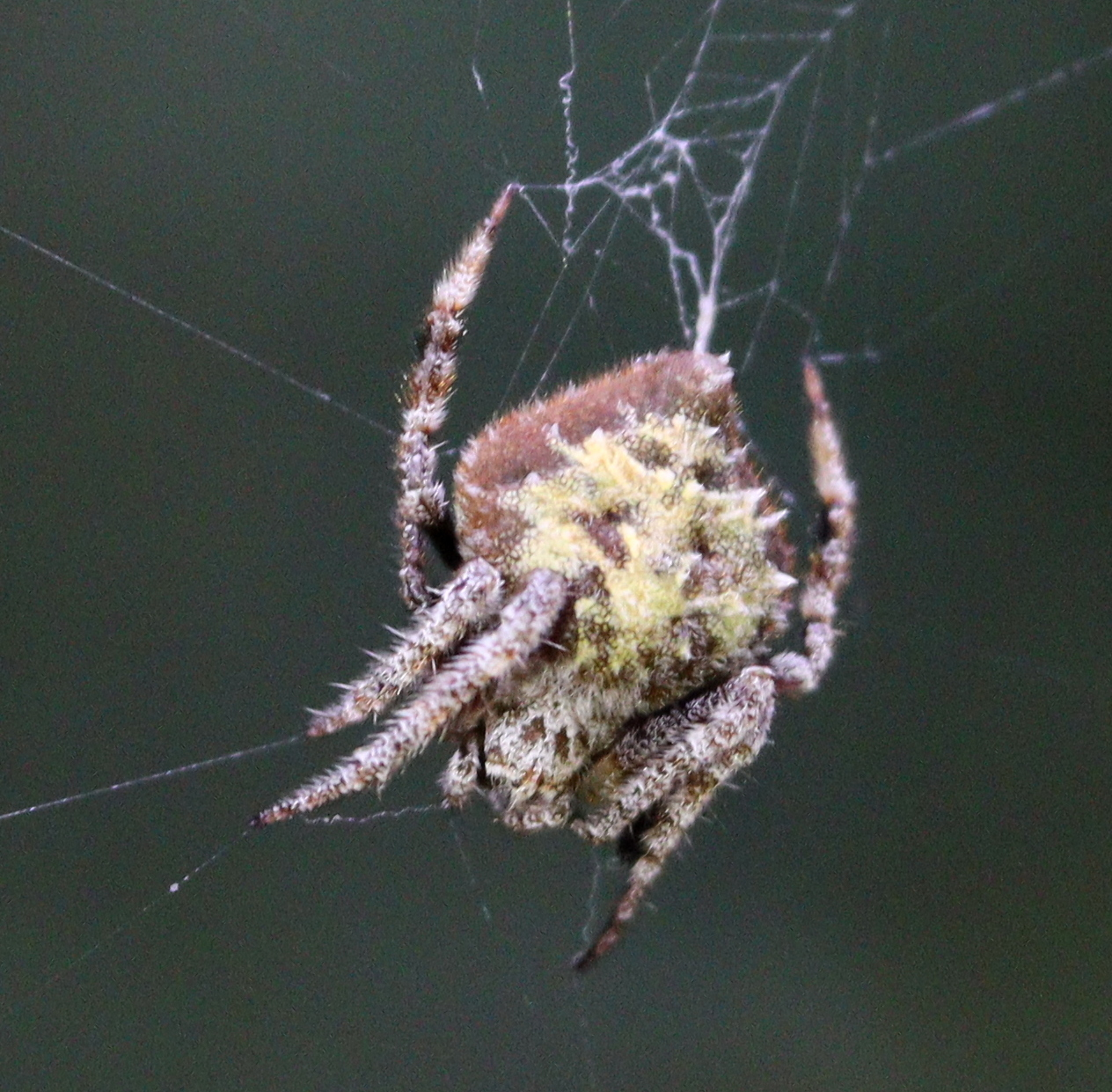
E. laglaizei

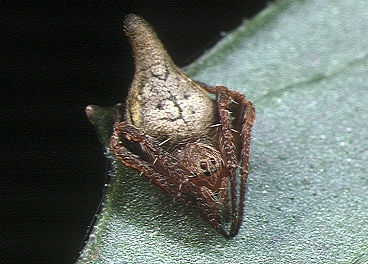
E. pseudocentrodes

As of November 2026, this genus includes 34 species:

- Eriovixia bannaensis Zhou, Zhu & Zhang, 2017 – China
- Eriovixia cavaleriei (Schenkel, 1963) – China
- Eriovixia enshiensis (Yin & Zhao, 1994) – China
- Eriovixia excelsa (Simon, 1889) – Pakistan, India, Thailand, China, Taiwan, Philippines, Indonesia. Introduced to South Africa, Eswatini
- Eriovixia ganae Mi & Li, 2021 – China
- Eriovixia gryffindori Ahmed, Khalap & Sumukha, 2016 – India
- Eriovixia hainanensis (Yin, Wang, Xie & Peng, 1990) – Hainan
- Eriovixia huwena Han & Zhu, 2010 – China
- Eriovixia jianfengensis Han & Zhu, 2010 – Hainan
- Eriovixia kachugaonensis P. Basumatary, Chanda, Das, Kalita, Brahma, T. Basumatary, B. K. Basumatary & Daimary, 2019 – India
- Eriovixia laglaizei (Simon, 1877) – Pakistan, India, Bangladesh, China, Philippines, Indonesia
- Eriovixia liuhongi Mi & Li, 2021 – China
- Eriovixia mahabaeus (Barrion & Litsinger, 1995) – Philippines
- Eriovixia menglunensis (Yin, Wang, Xie & Peng, 1990) – China
- Eriovixia napiformis (Thorell, 1899) – Cameroon, East Africa, Yemen
- Eriovixia nigrimaculata Han & Zhu, 2010 – China
- Eriovixia nocturnalis Biswas & Raychaudhuri, 2018 – Bangladesh
- Eriovixia nox (Simon, 1877) – India, Myanmar, Hainan, Taiwan, Japan, Philippines, Sumatra, Java, Sulawesi, Moluccas
- Eriovixia palawanensis (Barrion & Litsinger, 1995) – India, Philippines
- Eriovixia patulisus (Barrion & Litsinger, 1995) – India, Philippines
- Eriovixia pengi Mi & Li, 2021 – China
- Eriovixia poonaensis (Tikader & Bal, 1981) – India, China, Thailand, Malaysia
- Eriovixia porcula (Simon, 1877) – Singapore, Philippines
- Eriovixia pseudocentrodes (Bösenberg & Strand, 1906) – China, Laos, Japan
- Eriovixia rhinura (Pocock, 1900) – West, Central Africa (type species)
- Eriovixia sakiedaorum Tanikawa, 1999 – India, China (Hainan), Taiwan, Japan
- Eriovixia sticta Mi, Peng & Yin, 2010 – China
- Eriovixia tangi Mi & Li, 2021 – China
- Eriovixia turbinata (Thorell, 1899) – Cameroon, DR Congo
- Eriovixia wangchengi Mi & Li, 2021 – China
- Eriovixia yaoi Mi & Li, 2021 – China
- Eriovixia yinae Mi & Li, 2021 – China
- Eriovixia yunnanensis (Yin, Wang, Xie & Peng, 1990) – China, Thailand
- Eriovixia zhengi Mi & Li, 2021 – China
