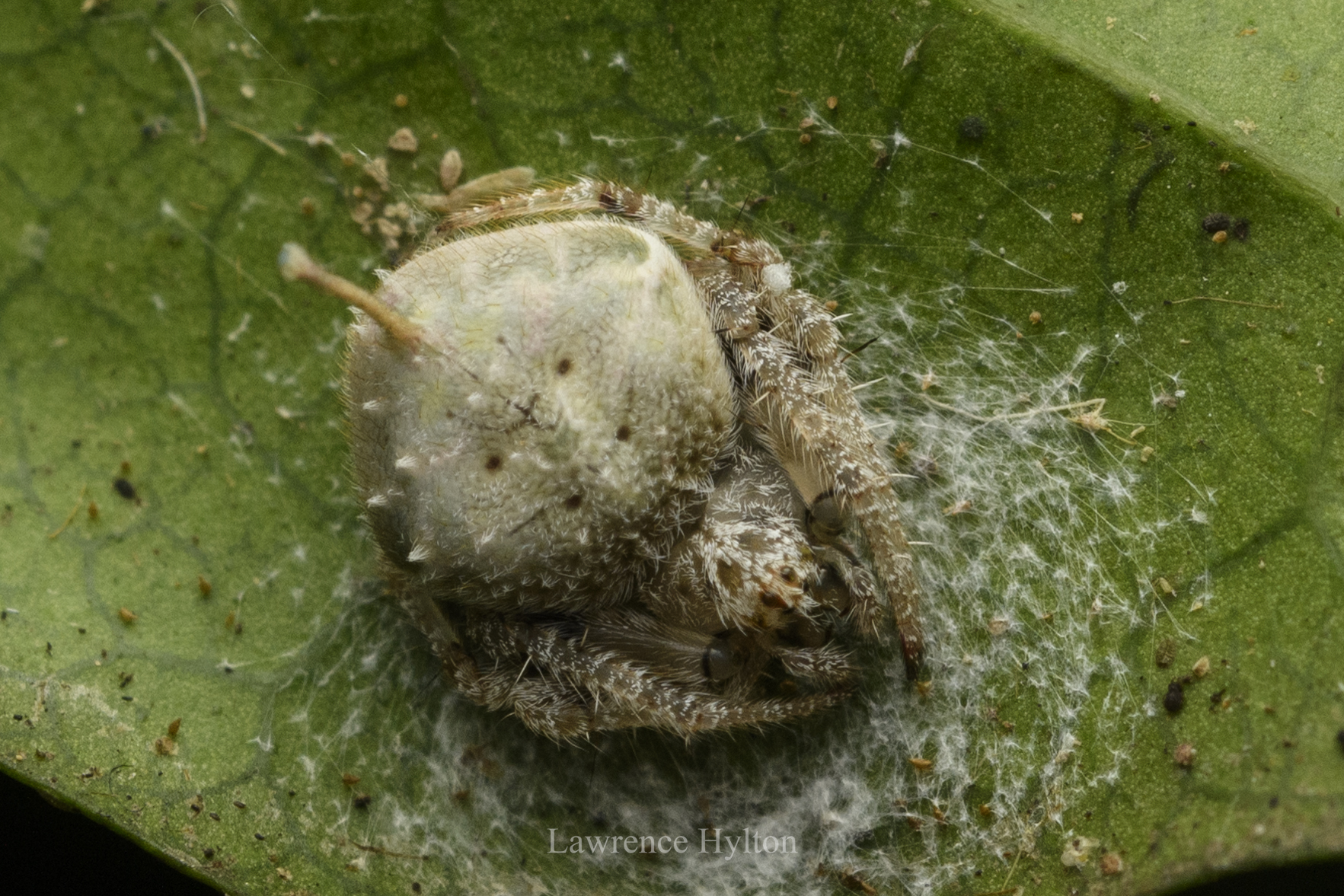
- Female from Hong Kong

Scientific classification
- Kingdom: Animalia
- Phylum: Arthropoda
- Subphylum: Chelicerata
- Class: Arachnida
- Order: Araneae
- Infraorder: Araneomorphae
- Family: Araneidae
- Genus: Eriovixia
- Species: E. laglaizei

Binomial name
- Eriovixia laglaizei (Simon, 1877)

Synonyms
- Epeira thomisoides Doleschall, 1857; Epeira laglaisei Simon, 1877; Epeira thelura Thorell, 1878; Araneus laglaizei Simon, 1895; Simonarachne laglaizei Archer, 1951; Neoscona laglaizei Tikader & Bal, 1981

= Eriovixia laglaizei =

Species of spider

Eriovixia laglaizei, or Laglaise's garden spider, is a species of orb weaver spider in the family Araneidae. It is widely distributed across tropical regions of Asia and is characterized by its distinctive cone-shaped abdomen with a prominent hump-like tail.

The specific epithet laglaizei honors the collector Laglaise.

== Taxonomy ==
The species was first described by Eugène Simon in 1877 as Epeira laglaizei from specimens collected in the Philippines. It has undergone several taxonomic revisions and was placed in various genera including Araneus, Neoscona, and Simonarachne before being transferred to Eriovixia by Grasshoff in 1986.

== Distribution ==
E. laglaizei has a wide distribution across tropical Asia, having been recorded from Pakistan, India, Bangladesh, Myanmar, China (including Hainan, Guangxi, Fujian, and Yunnan provinces), Thailand, Malaysia, Indonesia, the Philippines, Papua New Guinea, and Sri Lanka.

== Description ==
E. laglaizei is a small to medium-sized orb weaver spider with distinctive sexual dimorphism. Females are larger than males, with a total length ranging from 6.7 mm, while males measure approximately 5.3 mm in total length.

The carapace is yellowish and narrowing anteriorly, with the cephalic area slightly more elevated than the thoracic area. The species has eight eyes arranged in two rows, with the anterior eye row recurved and the posterior eye row almost straight. The chelicerae are yellowish and robust, with four promarginal and three retromarginal teeth.

The most distinctive feature is the abdomen, which is dorsally yellowish grey with chalk white patches and three pairs of brown sigillae arranged longitudinally. It is easy to recognise because of its short tail. The abdomen becomes wider gradually toward the middle, then narrows to form a prominent hump-like tail at the posterior end. The legs are long and moderately strong, yellow to yellowish brown, with the leg formula being 1-2-4-3.
