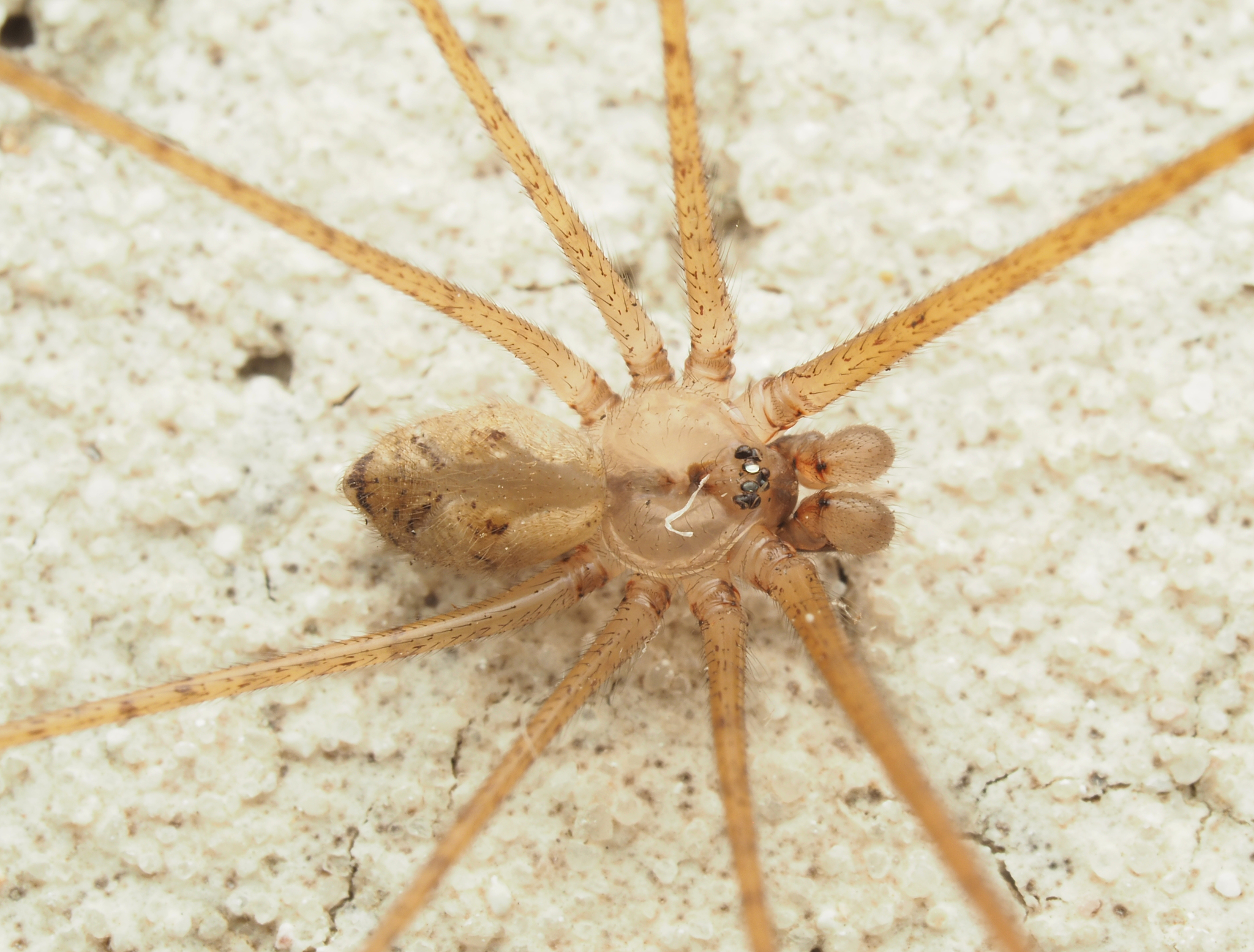
- C. lyoni
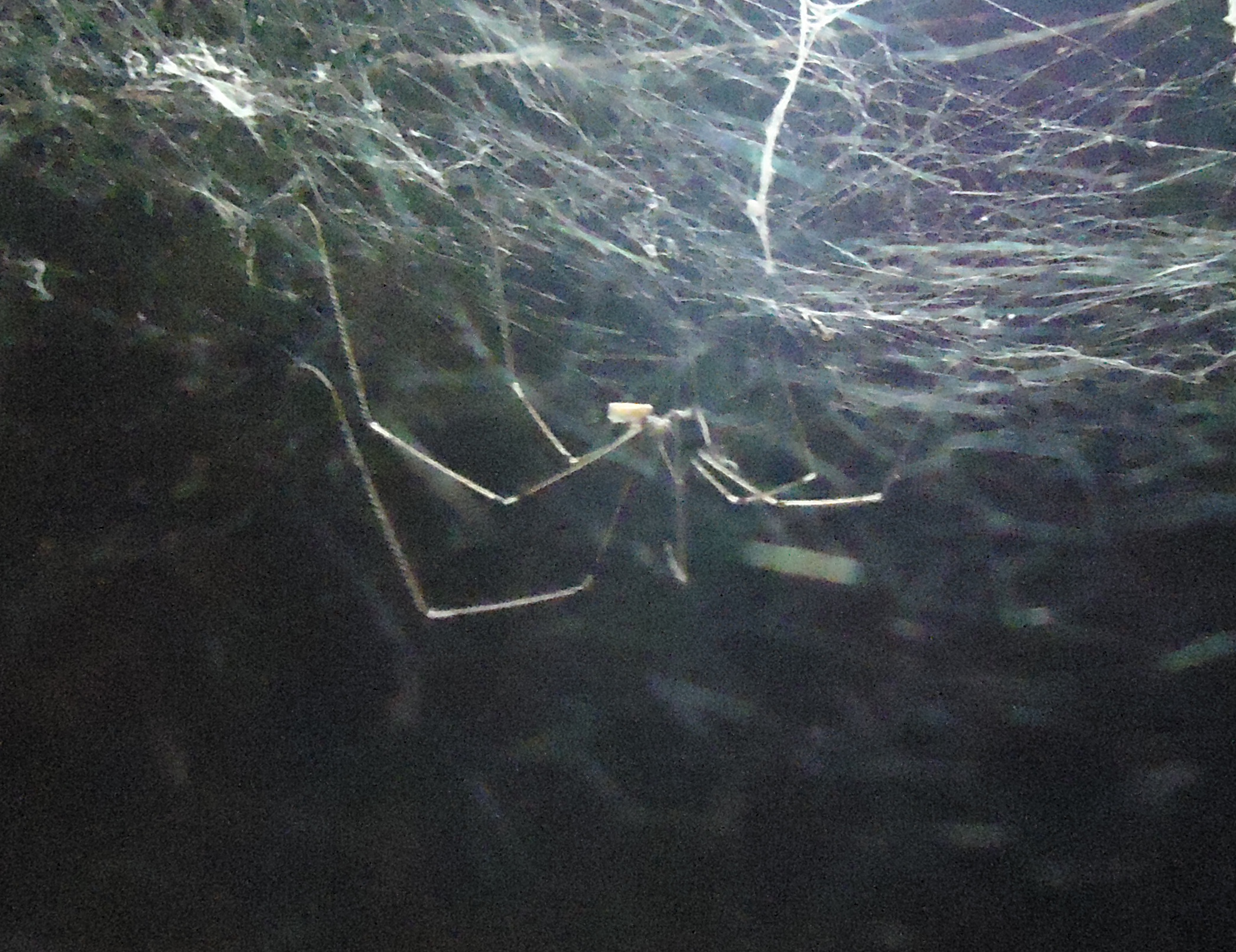
- C. lyoni from Philippines

Scientific classification
- Kingdom: Animalia
- Phylum: Arthropoda
- Subphylum: Chelicerata
- Class: Arachnida
- Order: Araneae
- Infraorder: Araneomorphae
- Family: Pholcidae
- Genus: Crossopriza
- Species: C. lyoni

Binomial name
- Crossopriza lyoni (Blackwall, 1867)
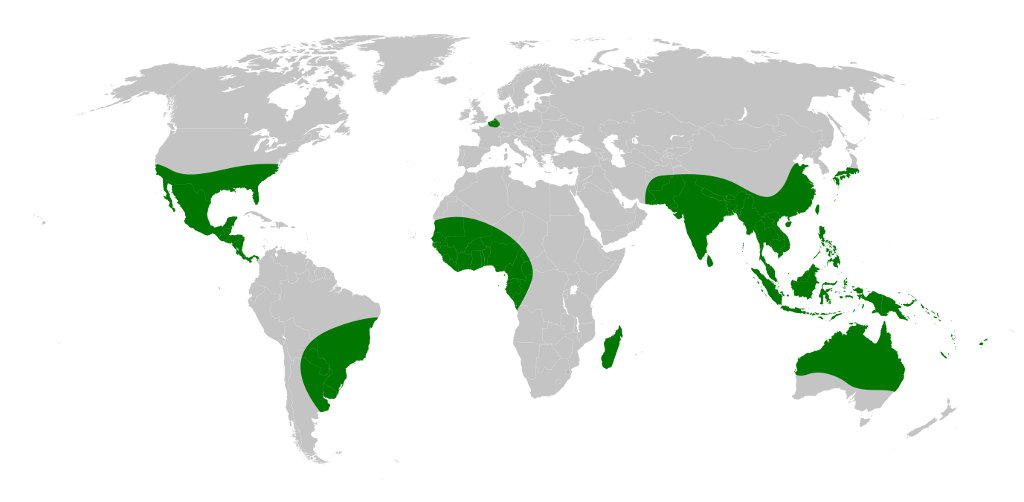
- C. lyoni estimated distribution.

Synonyms
- Species synonymy: Crossopriza brasiliensis Mello-Leitão, 1935; Crossopriza mucronata Mello-Leitão, 1942; Crossopriza francoisi Millot, 1946; Crossopriza stridulans Millot, 1946; Crossopriza lyoni Pocock, 1900; Crossopriza lyoni Simon, 1893; Pholcus lyoni Blackwall, 1867; Smeringopus lyoni Thorell, 1895; Tibiosa caracensis González-Sponga, 2006; Tibiosa casanaimensis González-Sponga, 2006; Tibiosa coreana González-Sponga, 2006; Tibiosa guayanesa González-Sponga, 2006; Tibiosa moraensis González-Sponga, 2006

= Crossopriza lyoni =

Tailed cellar spider

Species of spider

Crossopriza lyoni is a widespread species of cellar spiders that prefer to live in or around human structures. They are commonly known as tailed cellar spiders, tailed daddy longlegs spiders, and sometimes box spiders. They all possess extremely long fragile legs that can reach up to 6 cm (2.4 in) long and a body length of that ranges from 2.5 to 7 mm (0.098 to 0.276 in). Their abdomens are distinctly squarish when viewed from the side and their carapace is more or less circular when viewed from above. They also possess two kinds of sound-producing organs and have six eyes.

The original range of C. lyoni is unknown. They have been introduced into other parts of the world accidentally and are now pantropical in distribution. They are a regulated species in some countries and are often regarded as pests due to the large amounts of unsightly webs they construct inside human homes. Some people, however, regard them as beneficial, as they are efficient predators of mosquitoes and other arthropods. They are harmless to humans.

== Taxonomy and nomenclature ==
Crossopriza lyoni are classified under the genus Crossopriza and the subfamily Holocneminae. They belong to the cellar spider family (Pholcidae). They are commonly referred to as tailed daddy longlegs spiders, tailed cellar spiders, or (more rarely) box spiders. C. lyoni and other cellar spiders are also often confused with two other invertebrates - the harvestmen (order Opiliones) and the crane flies (family Tipulidae) - both of which are also known as 'daddy longlegs'. However, they are not closely related to cellar spiders — the latter is a fly; and the former, while also an arachnid, is not a spider at all.

The species was first formally described in 1867 by the British naturalist John Blackwall from a collection of spiders from Meerut, Agra, and Delhi. They came from Francis Lyon, a captain of the Royal Artillery of the British Empire stationed in India. They were sent to his sister who presented them to Blackwall at the suggestion of a mutual friend. Blackwall named the spider after Captain Lyon and expressed a hope that others may follow Lyon's example in collecting specimens from foreign countries for the benefit of science. He classified the species under the genus Pholcus. In 1892, the French arachnologist Eugène Simon erected the genus Crossopriza and subsequently reclassified Pholcus lyoni to Crossopriza lyoni.

Blackwall also described a curious case of gynandromorphism in one adult specimen, in which the left side was male and the right side was female.

== Description ==
Crossopriza lyoni
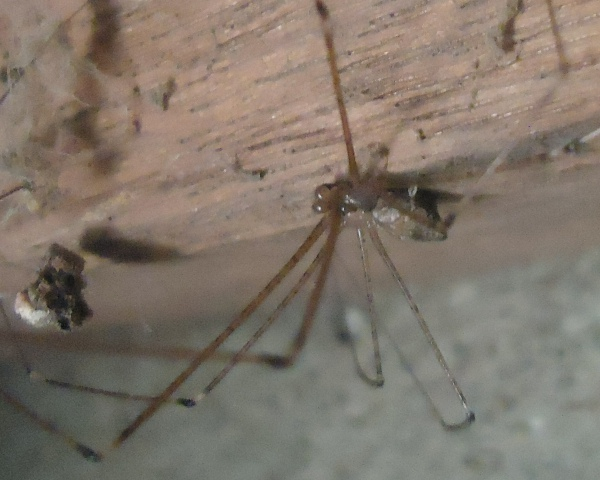
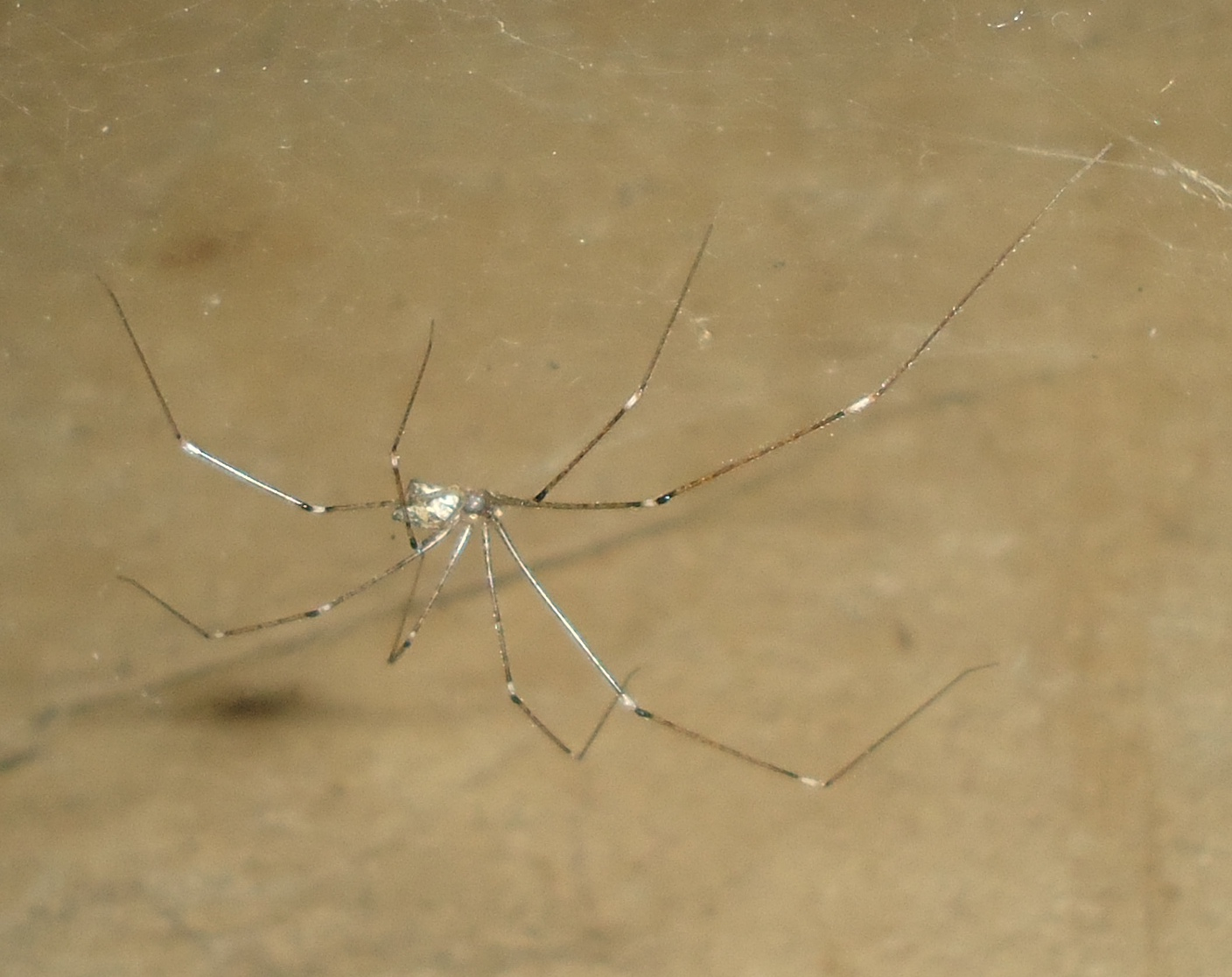
Left: Male tailed cellar spiders are recognizable by the enlarged pedipalps. Right: Female tailed cellar spider. (Both specimens from the Philippines)

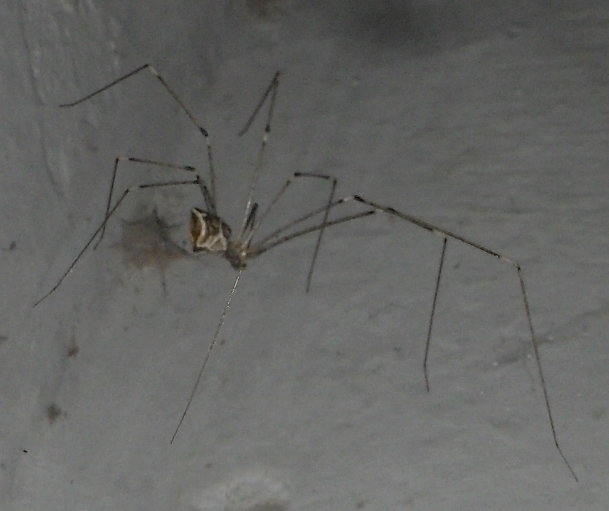
Crossopriza lyoni from India.

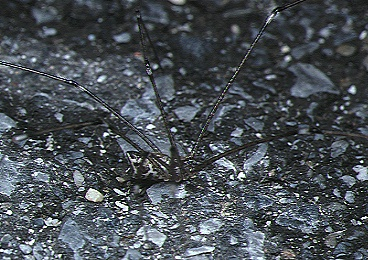
Female Crossopriza lyoni from Japan.

C. lyoni are sexually dimorphic. Females of C. lyoni are about 3 to 7 mm (0.12 to 0.28 in) in length. Males are slightly smaller, at about 2.5 to 6 mm (0.098 to 0.236 in) in length, and have prominent pedipalps. Both sexes possess extremely long fragile legs. Males have slightly longer legs than females. The first pair of legs in larger male individuals can reach up to 6 centimetres (2.4 in) in length. The legs are gray to amber in color and covered with numerous small longitudinal brown spots. The 'knee joints' are brown, and the ends of the femur and tibiae are girdled with white. Males also possess a series of 20 to 25 spines (macrosetae) on their femur. Their leg formula is I, II, IV, III - the front pair of legs being the longest and the third pair being the shortest.

The cephalothorax is wider than it is long, greyish-white to pale amber in color. The carapace is subcircular. In the middle of the upper surface is a deep depression (called the thoracic fovea) and a darker longitudinal band of color. C. lyoni, like most other cellar spiders, has eight eyes. They are pearly-white in color and located at the tip of the cephalothorax in two lines.

The abdomen (the opisthosoma) is gray with white lateral stripes and various dark and light patches on the sides and the upper surface. An irregular darker stripe runs lengthwise at the bottom surface. The abdomen is angular and somewhat box-shaped, with a small conical hump on the upper back.

They also possess two types of stridulatory organs. The first type is located at the posterior tips of their cephalothorax (the prosoma) in the form of two triangular protrusions. The spiders rub these structures with a matching pair of sclerotized plates at the anterior portion of the abdomen, producing sound. These structures are more prominent in females. They also possess stridulatory files (in the form of a series of small ridges) on their chelicerae which are rubbed against the pedipalps to produce sound. The second type is more prominent in males.

C. lyoni can be distinguished from other members of the genus through several ways: by the characteristic boxy shape of their abdomens (C. cylindrogaster has a cylindrical abdomen); by the presence of two apophyses (jutting structures) in the chelicerae of males (C. pristina, C. semicaudata, and C. soudanensis all possess only one apophysis on each chelicera); or simply by geographic distribution (C. lyoni can be found globally and is the only species of Crossopriza in the New World, while the other species like C. johncloudsleyi and C. nigrescens are restricted to Africa or the Middle East).

Diagnostic images for Crossopriza lyoni (male)

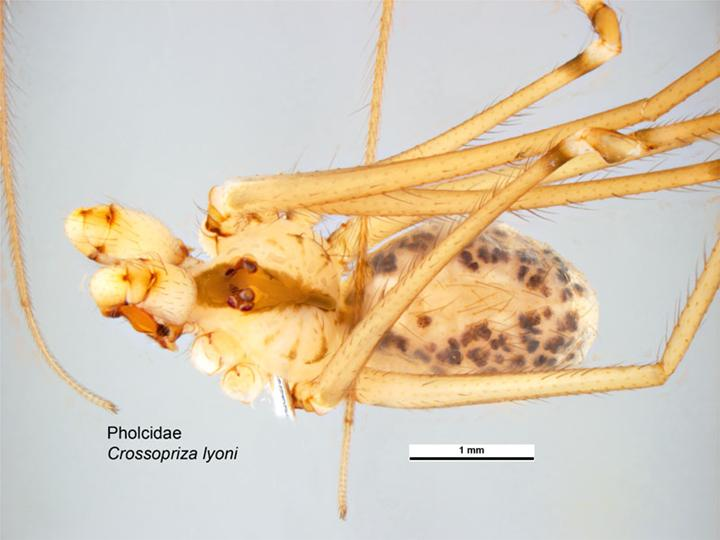
Dorsal view.
(Note: two left front legs are missing)

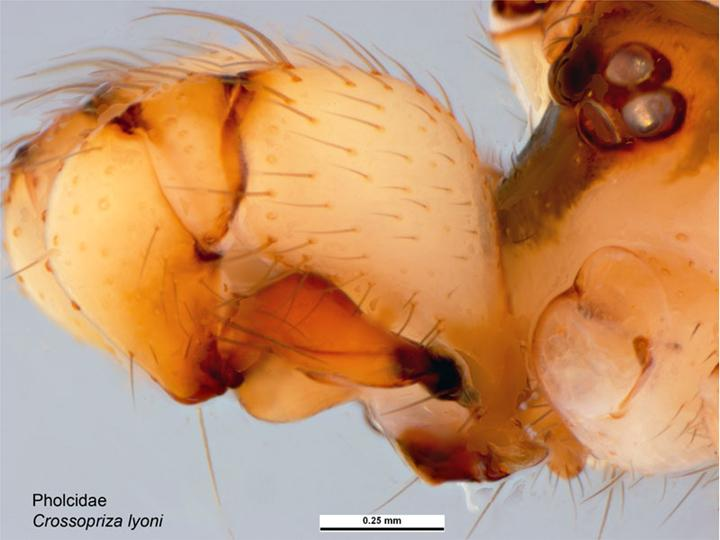
Close up of the male pedipalps

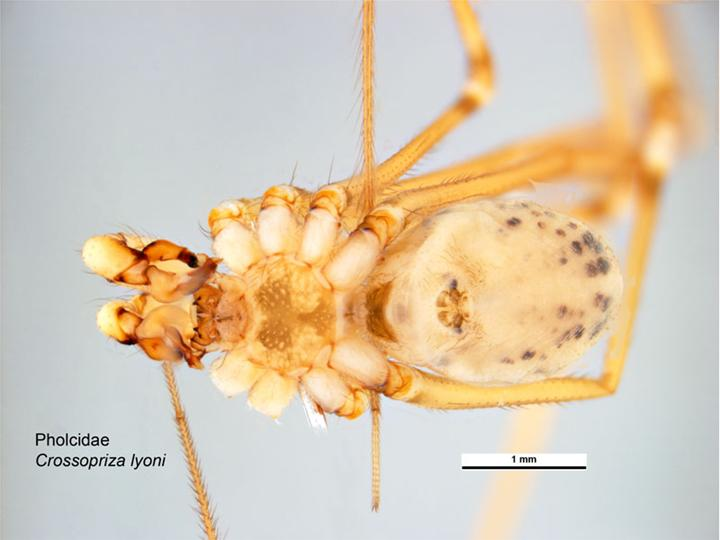
Ventral view.

== Ecology and life cycle ==
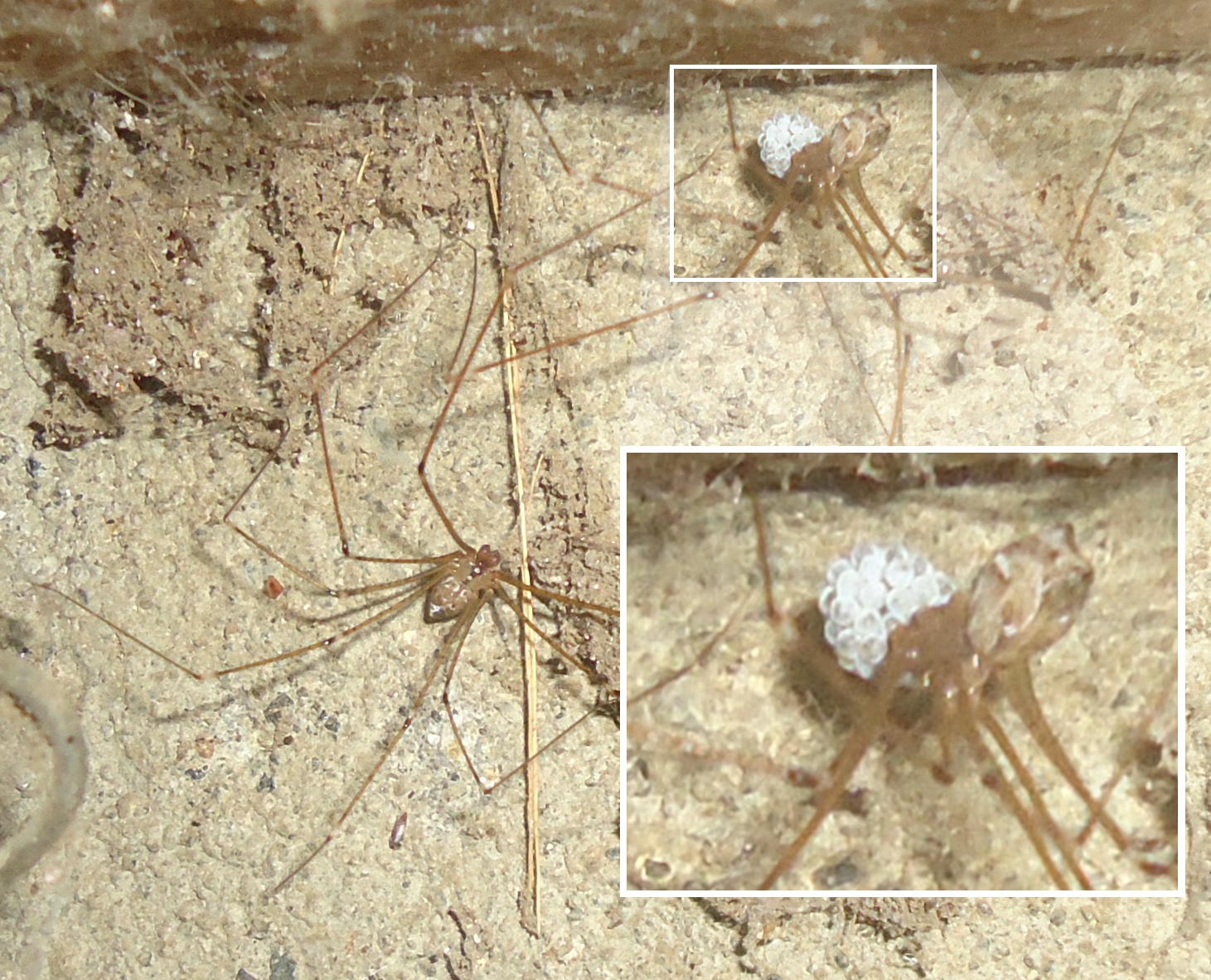
Two Crossopriza lyoni. The bottom one is male. The female is clutching her egg bundle (magnified).

A single male C. lyoni is able to copulate with several females. Mating is accomplished with the male inserting both his pedipalps into the genital orifice of the female and transferring a previously prepared packet of sperm into her spermathecae. Because of the relative shortness of the male pedipalps in comparison to the sheer length of the legs of both males and females of the species, the spiders have to bring their bodies close together, giving the impression of 'snuggling'. This lasts for about 40 minutes. In rare instances, females may eat the males after copulation.

Crossopriza lyoni vibrating rapidly in response to threat

The eggs are deposited by the females 5–6 days after copulation. After laying the eggs, females will bind them into a ball with tiny amounts of silk. They then clutch the resulting egg sacs with their mouthparts and carry them around (a behavior common among all cellar spiders). Eggs that somehow fall from the loose bundles do not hatch. The females still feed during this period, setting their burdens aside temporarily while they eat, then picking them up again. They also frequently adjust their grip. Instances of females eating some of their own eggs have been recorded. It is assumed that they only consume the infertile ones, as unfertilized eggs occur at high enough rates among C. lyoni.

5 to 54 spiderlings will eventually hatch from the eggs, 11 to 13 days after egg-laying. Spiderlings do not leave the eggs immediately. They hatch partially, but otherwise remain in the bundle their mothers carry for at least a day. They eventually leave it completely. They remain mostly inactive for 2 to 3 days after hatching until their first molt. Spiderlings which are separated from their mothers mature more rapidly than those which remained nearby. They become adults approximately 80 days after hatching. C. lyoni has a lifespan of at least 194 days (around 6 and a half months).

C. lyoni are active hunters. Hanging upside down, they will quickly capture prey caught in their irregular cobweb-like webs. If hungry enough, they also actively pursue prey that fly close to their webs. They do not use their fangs when hunting, throwing silk over prey instead and then wrapping them loosely using their hind legs. They will only bite them when they start to feed, which can sometimes be as long as six days after capture. They also actively clean their webs by removing carcasses regularly. When webs become too dirty, they build new ones.

Newly hatched spiderlings are just as active as adults. 2 to 4 days after their first molt, spiderlings can already overpower mosquitoes four times their own size. Spiderlings may share prey they caught themselves or prey caught by their mother. They may also engage in cannibalism by preying on their own siblings.

C. lyoni, like other cellar spiders, will violently gyrate their bodies in small circles when threatened. They can do this very rapidly, blurring their outline and making them very difficult to see. This behavior earned cellar spiders one of their common names - 'vibrating spiders' - and is presumed to be an antipredator adaptation. If this does not work, they will drop from their webs to the ground, or flee awkwardly with their characteristic long-legged gait.

== Distribution and habitat ==
C. lyoni are synanthropic, preferring to live inside or near human-made structures. They usually build large irregular webs in corners of rooms, basements, cellars, and beneath ceilings. They are readily transported by human activity, especially as hitchhikers in ships. As a result, C.lyoni has been introduced to most of the world, including Australia, Asia, Africa, Europe, North and South America, and some Pacific islands.

Their place of origin is unknown but have been variously posited to be Africa (where their genus has the highest diversity) or somewhere in Asia.

== Relations with humans ==
C. lyoni are a regulated invasive species in several countries.

While doing no appreciable damage to humans, they are sometimes regarded as pests due to the large amounts of unattractive webs they construct inside houses. Unlike most spiders which consume their old webs before building new ones, cellar spiders simply abandon their old webs. There are often hundreds of individuals representing different generations living in close proximity to each other in a given area.

Methods of controlling them can be as direct as simply using a broom or a vacuum cleaner to remove the webs. Preventive measures mostly focus on reducing the amounts of insect prey around the house. This includes changing exterior white lights to yellow or sodium vapor lights, colors which are less attractive to insects. Sealing small entry points can also prevent both insect and spider access into the house. Insecticides can also be used, but is usually only effective for a relatively short amount of time.

Some people regard C. lyoni spiders as beneficial. Adult C. lyoni can consume 12 to 20 mosquitoes (Aedes sp.) a day, in addition to other insect pests. Their effects on containing the populations of mosquitoes (Aedes, Anopheles, Culex, etc.) and other disease-transmitting arthropods harmful to humans seems to be significant. In areas where mosquito-borne diseases (like dengue fever) are present, it is recommended to avoid removing natural populations of C. lyoni. Studies have also shown that C. lyoni spiders that eat dengue virus-infected mosquitoes do not seem to acquire the virus themselves.

A study in 2009 showed that the webs of C. lyoni exhibit antibacterial properties against Escherichia coli, Pseudomonas aeruginosa, Staphylococcus aureus and others. Gram-positive bacteria were more vulnerable to the proteins from C. lyoni webs than Gram-negative bacteria.

C. lyoni and other pholcids are often the subject of a popular urban legend about how they are the most venomous known animals except that 'their fangs are too small to penetrate human skin'. While they do possess potent venom against insects and other spiders (some cellar spiders, for example, prey on deadly redback spiders in Australia), their venom is not harmful to humans.

== See also ==
- List of Pholcidae species
- Pholcus phalangioides, another widespread synanthropic cellar spider
- Spider cannibalism
