= Glyptogona =

Scientific classification
- Kingdom: Animalia
- Phylum: Arthropoda
- Subphylum: Chelicerata
- Class: Arachnida
- Order: Araneae
- Infraorder: Araneomorphae
- Family: Araneidae
- Genus: Glyptogona; Simon, 1885

Type species
- G. sextuberculata (Keyserling, 1863)

Species
- G. duriuscula Simon, 1895 – Sri Lanka; G. sextuberculata (Keyserling, 1863) – Italy to Israel

Genus of spiders

Glyptogona is a genus of orb-weaver spiders first described by Eugène Simon in 1885. As of November 2026 it contains only two species.
