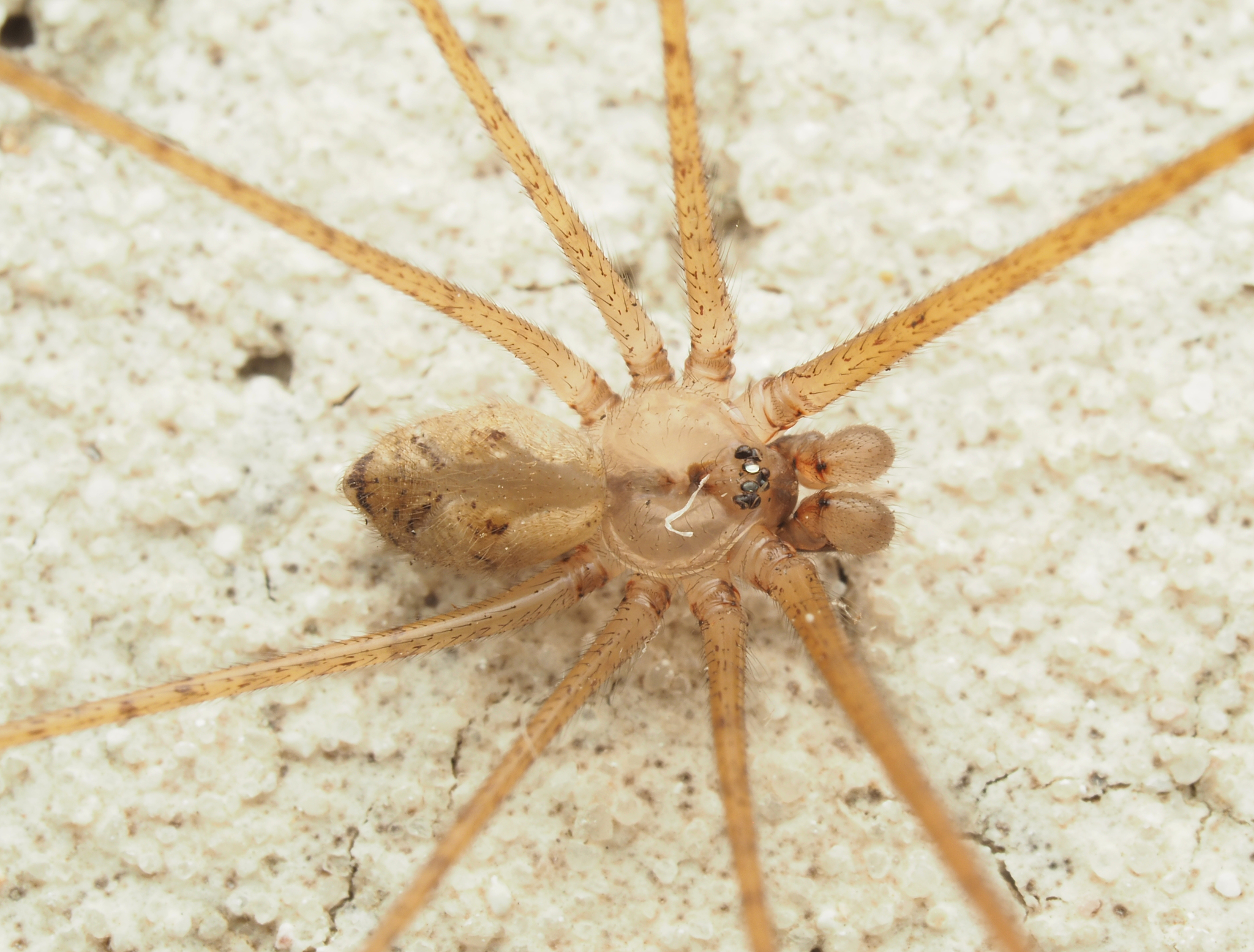
- Crossopriza lyoni
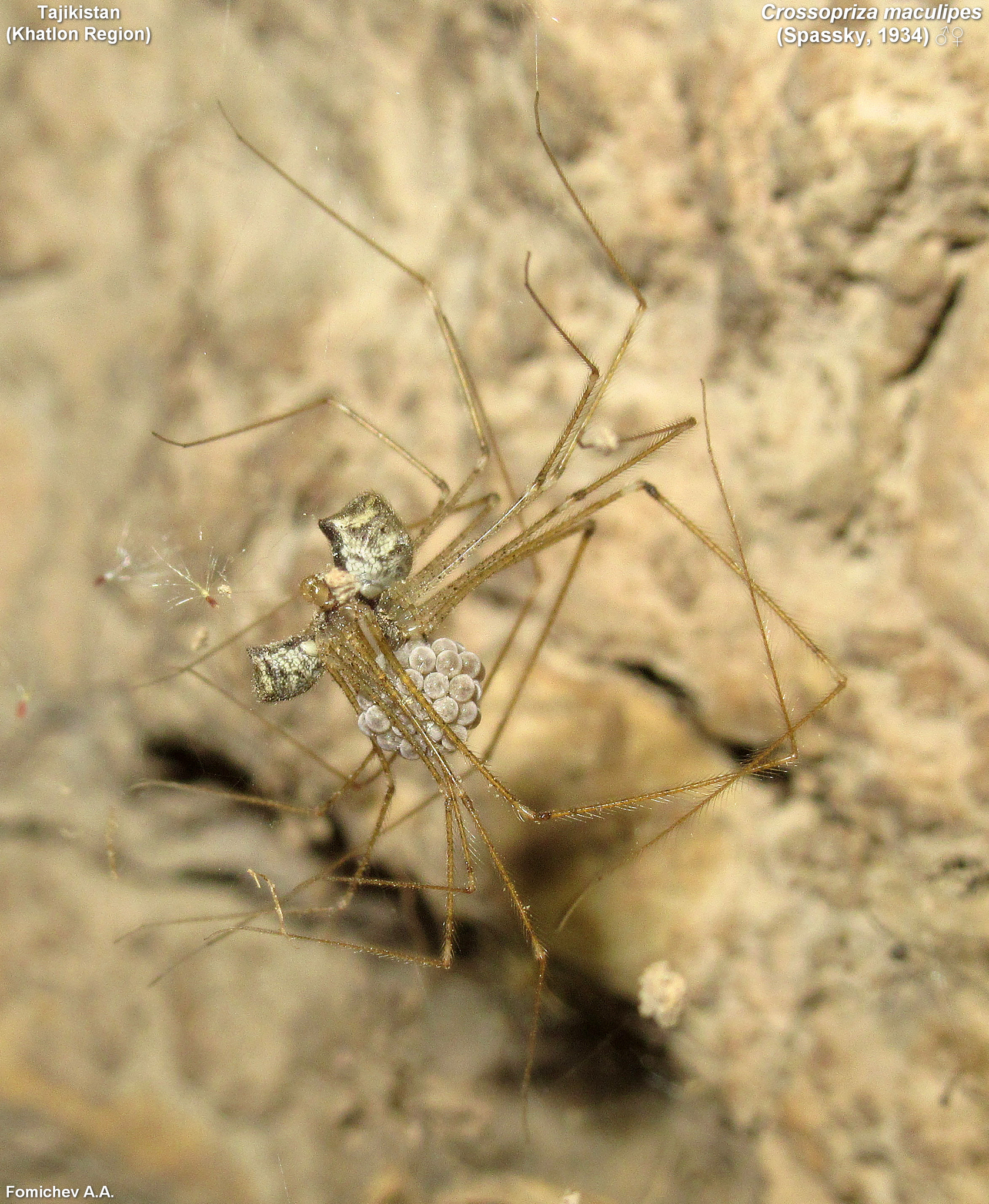
- female C. maculipes

Scientific classification
- Kingdom: Animalia
- Phylum: Arthropoda
- Subphylum: Chelicerata
- Class: Arachnida
- Order: Araneae
- Infraorder: Araneomorphae
- Family: Pholcidae
- Genus: Crossopriza; Simon, 1893

Type species
- C. pristina (Simon, 1890)

Species
- 24, see text

Synonyms
- Ceratopholcus Spassky, 1934; Tibiosa González-Sponga, 2006

= Crossopriza =

Genus of spiders

Crossopriza is a genus of cellar spiders that was first described by Eugène Louis Simon in 1893.

Its species are natively found in Africa and Asia. C. lyoni has been introduced to many parts of the world.

== Species ==
As of October 2025, this genus includes 24 species:

- Crossopriza dhofar Huber, 2022 – Oman
- Crossopriza ghul Huber, 2022 – Oman
- Crossopriza ibnsinai Huber, 2022 – Kazakhstan, Uzbekistan, Turkmenistan, Tajikistan, Afghanistan
- Crossopriza illizi Huber, 2022 – Algeria
- Crossopriza johncloudsleyi Deeleman-Reinhold & van Harten, 2001 – Yemen, Kenya
- Crossopriza kandahar Huber, 2022 – Afghanistan
- Crossopriza khayyami Huber, 2022 – Turkey, Iraq, Iran, Afghanistan
- Crossopriza kittan Huber, 2022 – Oman
- Crossopriza lyoni (Blackwall, 1867) – Probably native to Africa and/or Asia. Introduced to Americas, Belgium, Germany, Australia, Micronesia
- Crossopriza maculipes (Spassky, 1934) – Iraq, Kazakhstan, Uzbekistan, Turkmenistan, Tajikistan, Afghanistan, Pakistan
- Crossopriza malegaon Huber, 2022 – India
- Crossopriza manakhah Huber, 2022 – Yemen
- Crossopriza miskin Huber, 2022 – Oman
- Crossopriza moqal Huber, 2022 – Oman
- Crossopriza parsa Huber, 2022 – Iran
- Crossopriza pristina (Simon, 1890) – Sudan, Eritrea, Ethiopia, Yemen (type species)
- Crossopriza sahtan Huber, 2022 – Oman
- Crossopriza sanaa Huber, 2022 – Yemen
- Crossopriza semicaudata (O. Pickard-Cambridge, 1876) – Egypt, Chad, Sudan
- Crossopriza sengleti Huber, 2022 – Iran
- Crossopriza soudanensis Millot, 1941 – Mali, Burkina Faso
- Crossopriza srinagar Huber, 2022 – Pakistan, India
- Crossopriza surobi Huber, 2022 – Afghanistan
- Crossopriza tiwi Huber, 2022 – Oman

== See also ==
- List of Pholcidae species
