= Prolochus =

Genus of spiders

Prolochus is a possible genus of tropical spiders. As of September 2018, the World Spider Catalog does not accept the genus and treats it as a synonym of Dolichognatha, a genus in the family Tetragnathidae. In 2014, it was suggested that the genus be restored, and a newly discovered species was named as Prolochus junlitjri. Prolochus is said to have four main traits that distinguishes it from Dolichognatha: the total absence of posterior median eyes, a dorsal abdomen without dorsal humps, a distinct shape of abdomen and the palpal organ of the male.

== Possible species ==
- Prolochus longiceps Thorell, 1895, syn. Dolichognatha longiceps (Thorell, 1895) – Myanmar
- Prolochus junlitjri Barrion-Dupo & Barrion, 2014, syn. Dolichognatha junlitjri (Barrion-Dupo & Barrion, 2014) – Philippines
