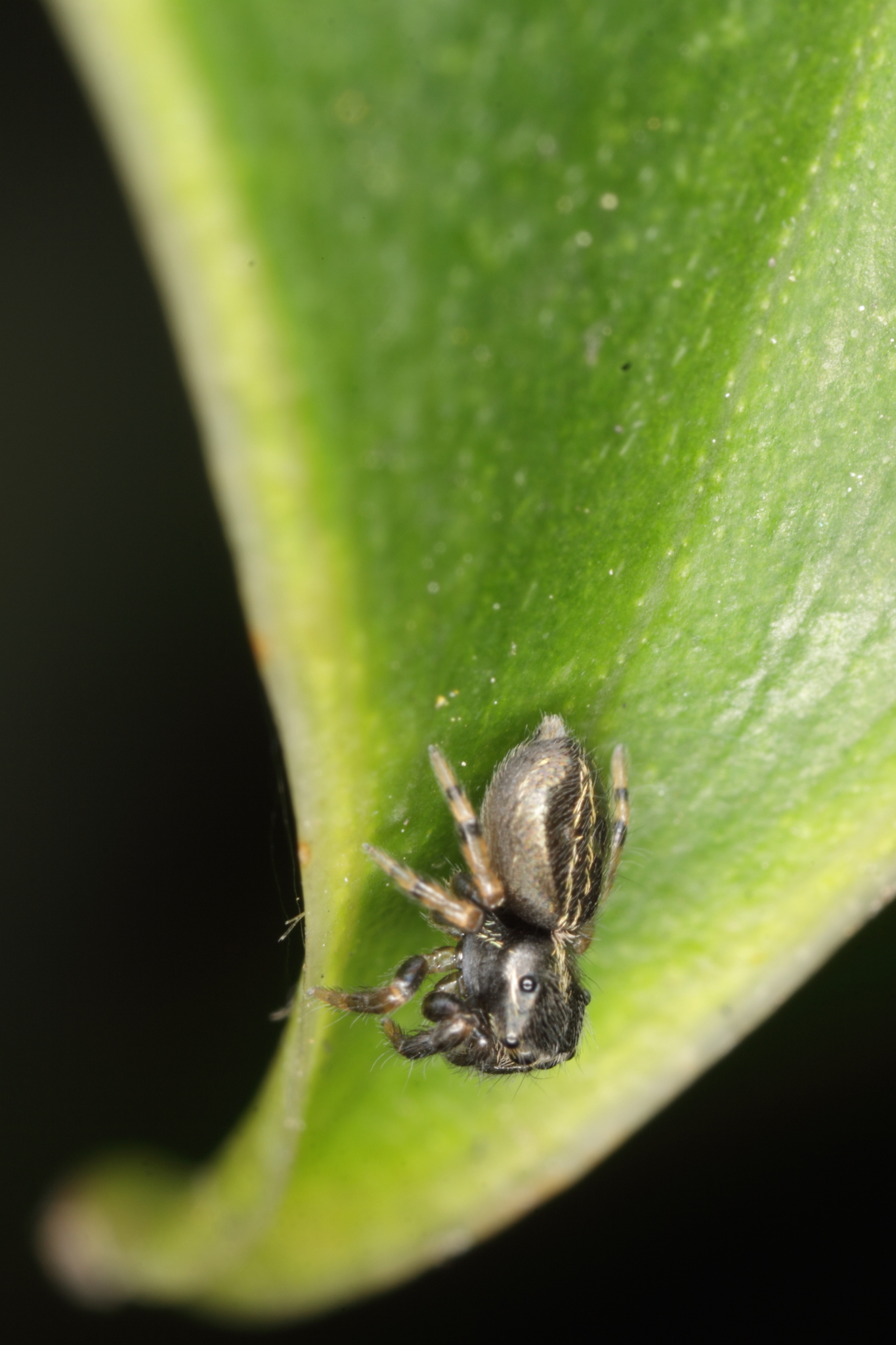
- female C. vietnamensis from Indonesia

Scientific classification
- Kingdom: Animalia
- Phylum: Arthropoda
- Subphylum: Chelicerata
- Class: Arachnida
- Order: Araneae
- Infraorder: Araneomorphae
- Family: Salticidae
- Tribe: Euophryini
- Genus: Chalcovietnamicus; Marusik, 1991

Type species
- Chalcoscirtus vietnamensis Żabka, 1985

Diversity
- 8 species

Synonyms
- Junxattus Prószyński & Deeleman-Reinhold, 2012

= Chalcovietnamicus =

Genus of spiders

Chalcovietnamicus is a genus of jumping spiders in the tribe Euophryini of the family Salticidae. The genus was originally described as a subgenus of Chalcoscirtus by Marusik in 1991 and was elevated to full genus rank by Logunov in 2020. The genus is found in Southeast Asia and southern China, with species recorded from Vietnam, Singapore, Malaysia, China, Indonesia, and the Philippines.

== Taxonomy ==
The genus Chalcovietnamicus was originally established by Marusik in 1991 as a subgenus of Chalcoscirtus to accommodate Chalcoscirtus vietnamensis, which Żabka had described from Vietnam in 1985. The subgenus was elevated to full genus status by Logunov in 2020.

The genus Junxattus, described by Prószyński and Deeleman-Reinhold in 2012, was synonymized with Chalcovietnamicus by Yu et al. in 2023, making Chalcovietnamicus the senior synonym. Additionally, Parvattus Zhang & Maddison, 2012 was briefly considered a synonym of Chalcovietnamicus by Logunov in 2020, but was later revalidated by Yu et al. in 2023.

== Distribution ==
Chalcovietnamicus species are distributed across Southeast Asia and southern China.

== Ecology and habitat ==
Chalcovietnamicus species are leaf-litter dwelling spiders that inhabit tropical forest environments. They are small spiders that live on the forest floor, often hiding under leaf litter or in small crevices. Some species, such as C. vietnamensis, have been found on tree trunks hiding in small silk cocoons built in bark crevices, while others have been observed in grass tussocks near mangrove areas.

== Description ==
Chalcovietnamicus are diminutive jumping spiders, with males ranging from 2.18 to 3.30 mm in body length. They are characterized by their glossy, elongated bodies and rather high carapaces with slim legs. Males typically have large, shiny dorsal scuta on their opisthosoma.

The carapace is rather high with a length-to-height ratio of 2.1–2.6, and is glossy and sparsely covered with white recumbent scales. The cephalothorax declines abruptly at about 45 degrees, and a fovea is present. The eyes are arranged in three rows, with the anterior eye row being 2–10% wider than the posterior eye row.

The chelicerae are small and vertical, with the promargin having two small teeth and the retromargin having either one small tooth or a fissidentate tooth with four cusps. The opisthosoma is elongated with a length-to-width ratio of 1.3–1.5, and is 1.2–1.4 times shorter than the carapace.

The male pedipalp is distinctive, with a short palpal tibia that is 1.6–2.2 times shorter than the functional tegulum. The retrolateral tibial apophysis is thick and strong, approximately 1.4 times longer than the palpal tibia.The embolus is characteristically short and corkscrew-like, which is a key diagnostic feature of the genus.

Female copulatory organs, where known, feature an epigynal plate that is flat without a median septum, with two shallow round fossae situated in its center. The spermathecae are drop-shaped and subparallel.

== Species ==
As of September 2025, the genus Chalcovietnamicus contains eight recognized species:

- Chalcovietnamicus daiqini (Prószyński & Deeleman-Reinhold, 2012) – Malaysia, Singapore, Indonesia
- Chalcovietnamicus lii (Lei & Peng, 2010) – China
- Chalcovietnamicus logunovi Yu, Maddison & Zhang, 2023 – Malaysia
- Chalcovietnamicus marusiki Yu, Maddison & Zhang, 2023 – Malaysia
- Chalcovietnamicus naga Logunov, 2020 – Philippines
- Chalcovietnamicus terbakar Yu, Maddison & Zhang, 2023 – Singapore
- Chalcovietnamicus vietnamensis (Żabka, 1985) – Vietnam, Singapore
- Chalcovietnamicus weihangi Yu & Zhang, 2023 – China

== Etymology ==
The genus name Chalcovietnamicus is derived from the Greek word χαλκός "chalcos" (meaning bronze or copper) combined with "vietnamicus" (referring to Vietnam), in reference to the type species C. vietnamensis which was originally described from Vietnam.
