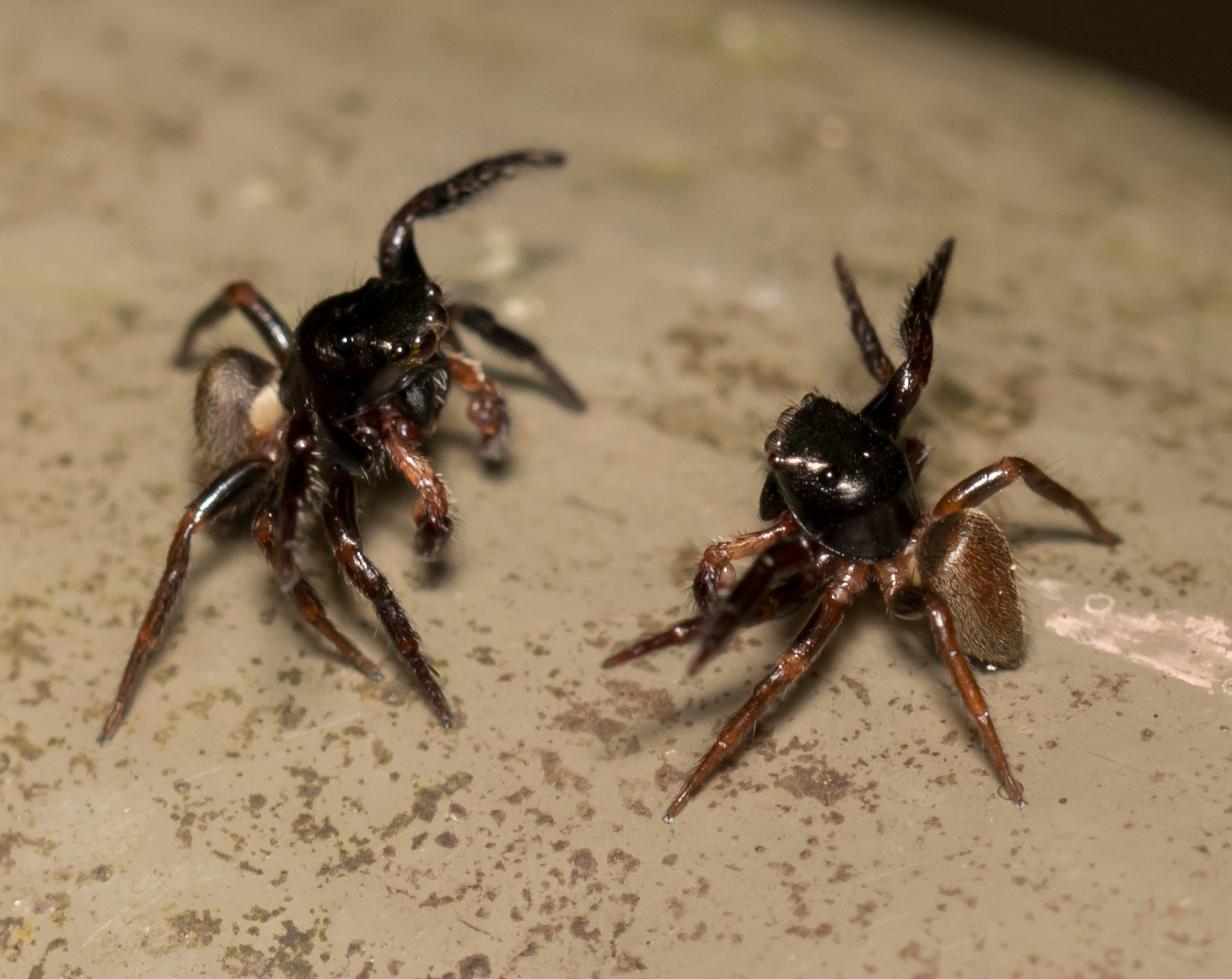
- dueling males of O. proszynskii

Scientific classification
- Kingdom: Animalia
- Phylum: Arthropoda
- Subphylum: Chelicerata
- Class: Arachnida
- Order: Araneae
- Infraorder: Araneomorphae
- Family: Salticidae
- Subfamily: Salticinae
- Genus: Orcevia; Thorell, 1890

Type species
- O. keyserlingi Thorell, 1890

Species
- 6, see text

= Orcevia =

Genus of jumping spiders

Orcevia is a genus of Asian jumping spiders first described by Tamerlan Thorell in 1890. Laufeia, circumscribed to include Orcevia, is placed in the tribe Euophryini in the Salticoida clade of Salticinae. It was once considered a synonym of Laufeia, but it was revalidated in 2019.

== Species ==
As of March 2022 it contains six species:

- O. eucola Thorell, 1890 – Indonesia (Sumatra)
- O. keyserlingi Thorell, 1890 (type) – Indonesia (Sumatra, Java)
- O. kuloni Prószyński & Deeleman-Reinhold, 2012 – Indonesia (Java)
- O. perakensis (Simon, 1901) – Malaysia, Indonesia (Java)
- O. proszynskii (Song, Gu & Chen, 1988) – China
- O. terrestris Logunov, 2021 – Vietnam

== See also ==
- Laufeia
- List of Salticidae genera
