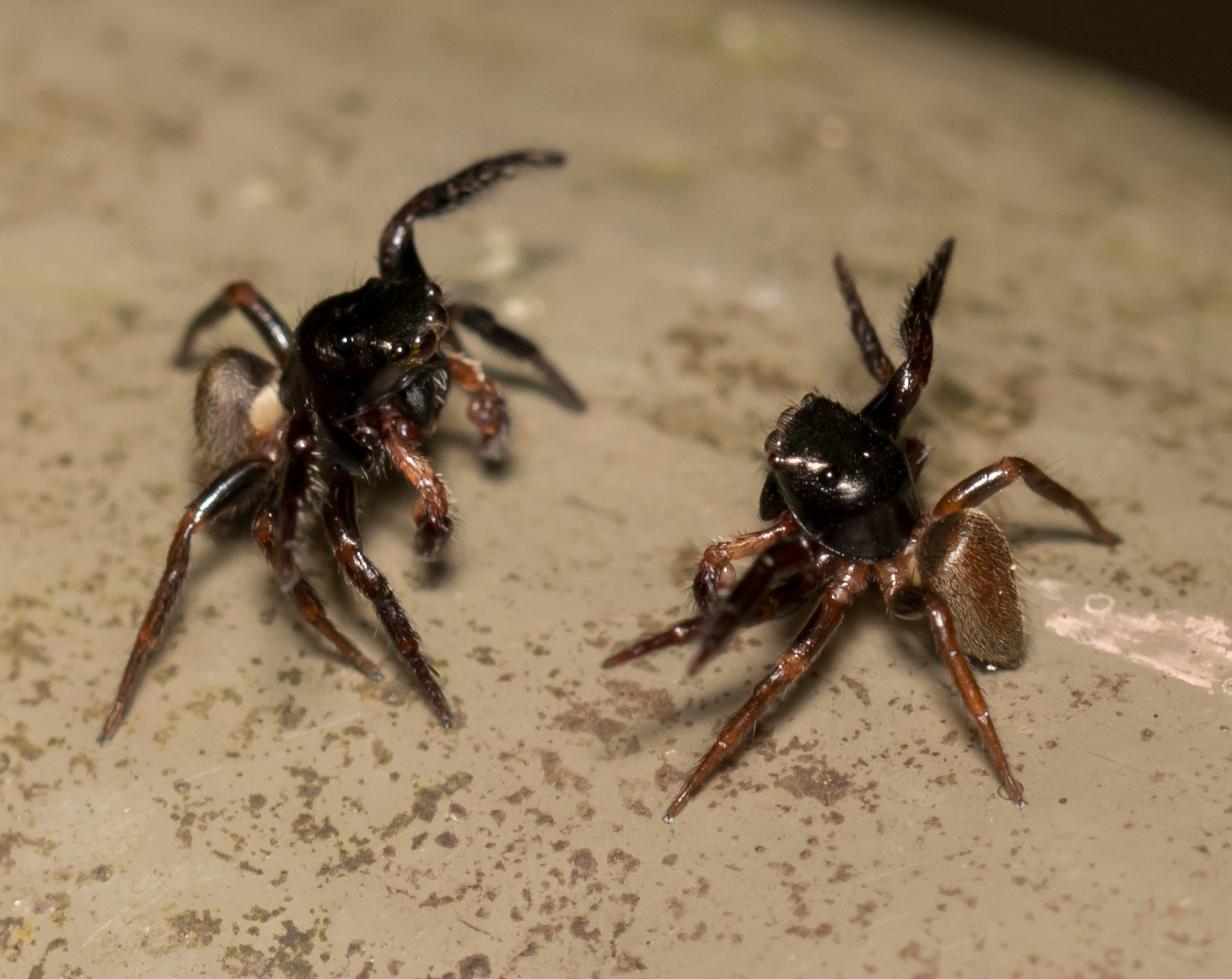
- dueling males in Hong Kong

Scientific classification
- Kingdom: Animalia
- Phylum: Arthropoda
- Subphylum: Chelicerata
- Class: Arachnida
- Order: Araneae
- Infraorder: Araneomorphae
- Family: Salticidae
- Genus: Orcevia
- Species: O. proszynskii

Binomial name
- Orcevia proszynskii (Song, Gu & Chen, 1988)

Synonyms
- Laufeia proszynskii Song, Gu & Chen, 1988

= Orcevia proszynskii =

Species of spider

Orcevia proszynskii is a species of jumping spider of the genus Orcevia. It is endemic to China.

== Etymology ==
The species epithet proszynskii honours Jerzy Prószyński (born 1935), a prominent Polish arachnologist who specializes in the systematics of jumping spiders.

== Taxonomy ==
The species was originally described as Laufeia proszynskii by Song, Gu and Chen in 1988 from specimens collected in Hainan Island, China. It was subsequently transferred to the genus Orcevia by Prószyński and Deeleman-Reinhold in 2012, then back to Laufeia by Zhang and Maddison in 2015, and finally returned to Orcevia following the revalidation of the genus in 2019.

== Distribution ==
O. proszynskii has been described from Hainan Island in southern China. Specimens have been recorded from several locations including Ledong County (Jianfengling National Park) and Sanya City.

== Habitat ==
All specimens have been collected from cracks in tree trunks or on wooden handrails in forested areas.

== Description ==
Orcevia proszynskii is a relatively small jumping spider. Males have a total body length of approximately 6.18 mm, with the cephalothorax measuring 3.09 mm in length and 2.41 mm in width, and the abdomen measuring 3.09 mm in length and 2.28 mm in width.

The male can be distinguished from other Orcevia species by its straight spine-like retrolateral tibial apophysis (RTA), domed top margin of the lateral projection of the tegulum, and the absence of a ventral finger of the basal part of the embolus in the palpal bulb.

The female was first described in 2023 and is characterized by having a rather dark body with a sternum bearing dense pits centrally. The epigyne has outer rims of each atrium extending upwards and connecting to form a large but shallow concave area at the upper part. The female's rough central area of the sternum, which contains numerous small pits, is a diagnostic feature that distinguishes it from other congeners.
