= Chuanattus =

Scientific classification
- Kingdom: Animalia
- Phylum: Arthropoda
- Subphylum: Chelicerata
- Class: Arachnida
- Order: Araneae
- Infraorder: Araneomorphae
- Family: Salticidae
- Genus: Chuanattus; C. Wang, Mi & Li, 2025
- Species: C. deelemanae

Binomial name
- Chuanattus deelemanae C. Wang, Mi & Li, 2025

Species of spider

Chuanattus is a monotypic genus of spiders in the family Salticidae containing the single species, Chuanattus deelemanae.

== Distribution ==
Chuanattus deelemanae has only been recorded from Sichuan, China.

== Etymology ==
The genus name is a combination of Sichuan (四川; Sìchuān) and the common endung for salticid genera, "-attus". The species name honors arachnologist Christa L. Deeleman-Reinhold (1930–2025).
