= Stergusa =

Scientific classification
- Kingdom: Animalia
- Phylum: Arthropoda
- Subphylum: Chelicerata
- Class: Arachnida
- Order: Araneae
- Infraorder: Araneomorphae
- Family: Salticidae
- Subfamily: Salticinae
- Genus: Stergusa; Simon, 1889

Type species
- S. improbula Simon, 1889

Species
- 5, see text

Genus of spiders

Stergusa is a genus of jumping spiders that was first described by Eugène Louis Simon in 1889.

== Species ==
As of August 2019 it contains five species, found only in Asia and on New Caledonia:

- Stergusa aurata Simon, 1902 – Sri Lanka
- Stergusa aurichalcea Simon, 1902 – Sri Lanka
- Stergusa improbula Simon, 1889 (type) – New Caledonia
- Stergusa incerta Prószyński & Deeleman-Reinhold, 2010 – Indonesia (Sumbawa)
- Stergusa stelligera Simon, 1902 – Sri Lanka
