= Fageiella =

Scientific classification
- Kingdom: Animalia
- Phylum: Arthropoda
- Subphylum: Chelicerata
- Class: Arachnida
- Order: Araneae
- Infraorder: Araneomorphae
- Family: Linyphiidae
- Genus: Fageiella; Kratochvíl, 1934

Type species
- F. patellata (Kulczyński, 1913)

Species
- F. ensigera Deeleman-Reinhold, 1974 – Serbia, Montenegro, Kozovo; F. patellata (Kulczyński, 1913) – Southeastern Europe

Genus of spiders

Fageiella is a genus of Balkan dwarf spiders that was first described by J. Kratochvíl in 1934. As of May 2019 it contains only two species: F. ensigera and F. patellata.
