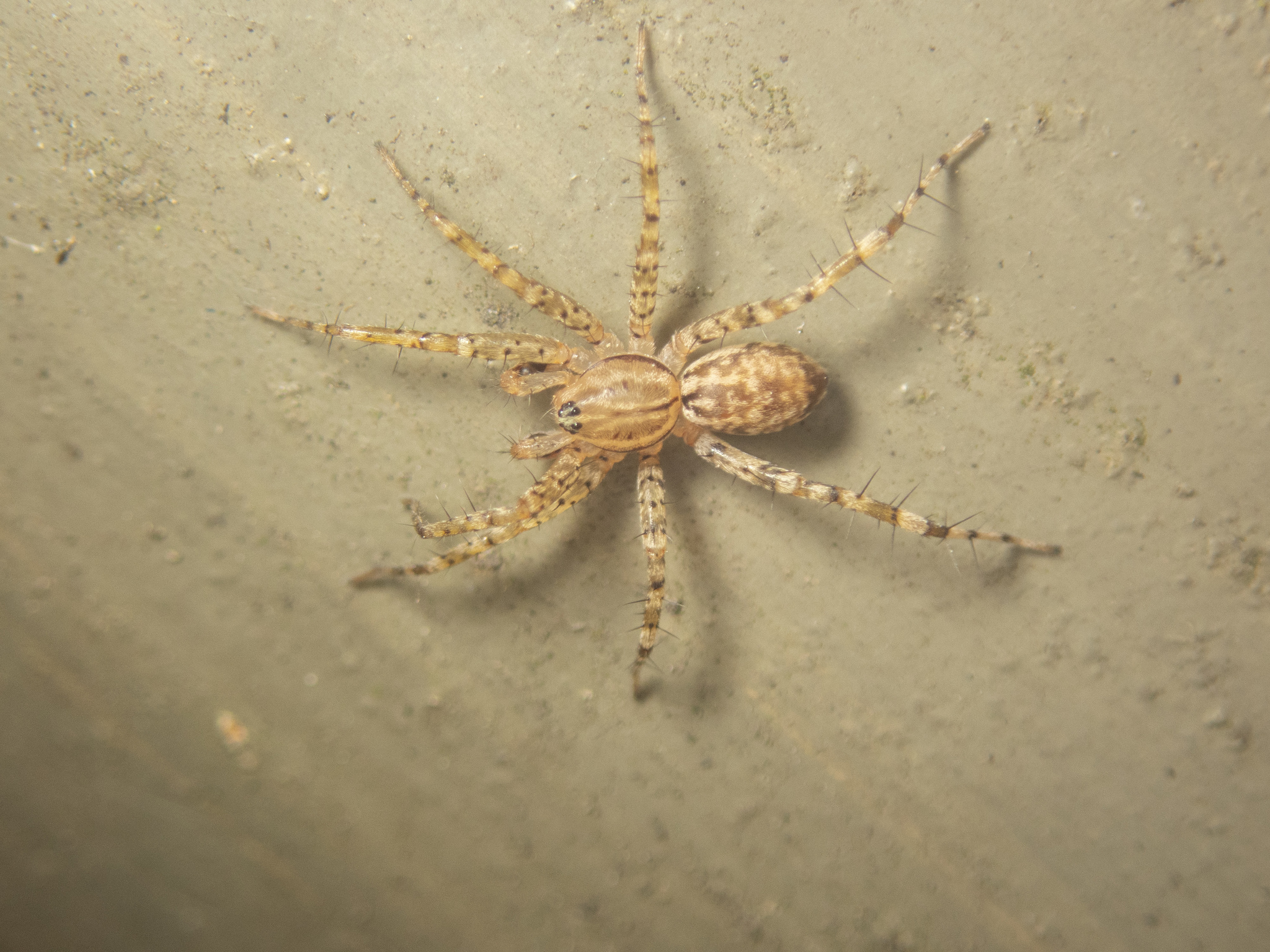
- male from Hong Kong

Scientific classification
- Kingdom: Animalia
- Phylum: Arthropoda
- Subphylum: Chelicerata
- Class: Arachnida
- Order: Araneae
- Infraorder: Araneomorphae
- Family: Corinnidae
- Genus: Echinax
- Species: E. panache

Binomial name
- Echinax panache Deeleman-Reinhold, 2001

Synonyms
- Echinax oxyopoides Yang, Song & Zhu, 2004 (misidentified females)

= Echinax panache =

Species of spider

Echinax panache is a species of spider in the family Corinnidae, subfamily Castianeirinae. It is found in Thailand, China, and India.

== Taxonomy ==
The species was first described by Christa L. Deeleman-Reinhold in 2001 based on a male holotype from northern Thailand. The female was first described in 2009 by Marusik, Zheng & Li. Some female specimens from Yunnan Province, China, were initially misidentified as Echinax oxyopoides by Yang et al. in 2004, but were later correctly identified as E. panache.

== Distribution ==
E. panache has been recorded from northern Thailand (the type locality near Chiang Mai), Yunnan Province in China, and India. The species appears to be distributed across forested regions of Southeast and South Asia.

== Habitat ==
This species has been collected in forest environments, including rainforest habitats in nature reserves. The holotype was collected using pitfall traps.

== Description ==
E. panache males measure approximately 4.25 mm in total length and females about 5.3 mm.

Males have a pale yellow carapace with longitudinal dark bands formed by prostrate hairs, and pale yellow legs with darker mottling on the upper surfaces. The abdomen is creamy yellow with a distinctive pattern formed by dark hairs. A key diagnostic feature is the presence of three pairs of thick, flattened spines (spatulate setae) on the upper surface of the male's cymbium.

Females are slightly larger and have a yellow carapace with dark marginal stripes surrounded by light brown bands formed by hairs. The abdomen is yellow with a brown pattern, and there is a distinctive heart-shaped mark that is interrupted by a transverse band. The legs are yellow with some darker spots and rings on the upper surfaces.

== Etymology ==
The species name panache is derived from the French word meaning "feather" or "a tuft of plume used as an ornament for a helmet", referring to the distinctive spatulate setae on the male's cymbium that resemble feathers.
