= Poecilorchestes =

Scientific classification
- Kingdom: Animalia
- Phylum: Arthropoda
- Subphylum: Chelicerata
- Class: Arachnida
- Order: Araneae
- Infraorder: Araneomorphae
- Family: Salticidae
- Subfamily: Salticinae
- Genus: Poecilorchestes; Simon, 1901

Type species
- P. decoratus Simon, 1901

Species
- P. decoratus Simon, 1901 – New Guinea; P. logunovi Prószyński & Deeleman-Reinhold, 2013 – Borneo

Genus of spiders

Poecilorchestes is a genus of jumping spiders that was first described by Eugène Louis Simon in 1901. As of August 2019 it contains only two species, found only in Papua New Guinea and on Borneo: P. decoratus and P. logunovi.

In Maddison's 2015 classification of the family Salticidae, Poecilorchestes is placed in the tribe Viciriini, part of the Salticoida clade of the subfamily Salticinae.
