= Iberoneta =

Scientific classification
- Kingdom: Animalia
- Phylum: Arthropoda
- Subphylum: Chelicerata
- Class: Arachnida
- Order: Araneae
- Infraorder: Araneomorphae
- Family: Linyphiidae
- Genus: Iberoneta; Deeleman-Reinhold, 1984
- Species: I. nasewoa

Binomial name
- Iberoneta nasewoa Deeleman-Reinhold, 1984

Genus of spiders

Iberoneta is a monotypic genus of European dwarf spiders containing the single species, Iberoneta nasewoa. It was first described by Christa Laetitia Deeleman-Reinhold in 1984, and has only been found in Spain.
