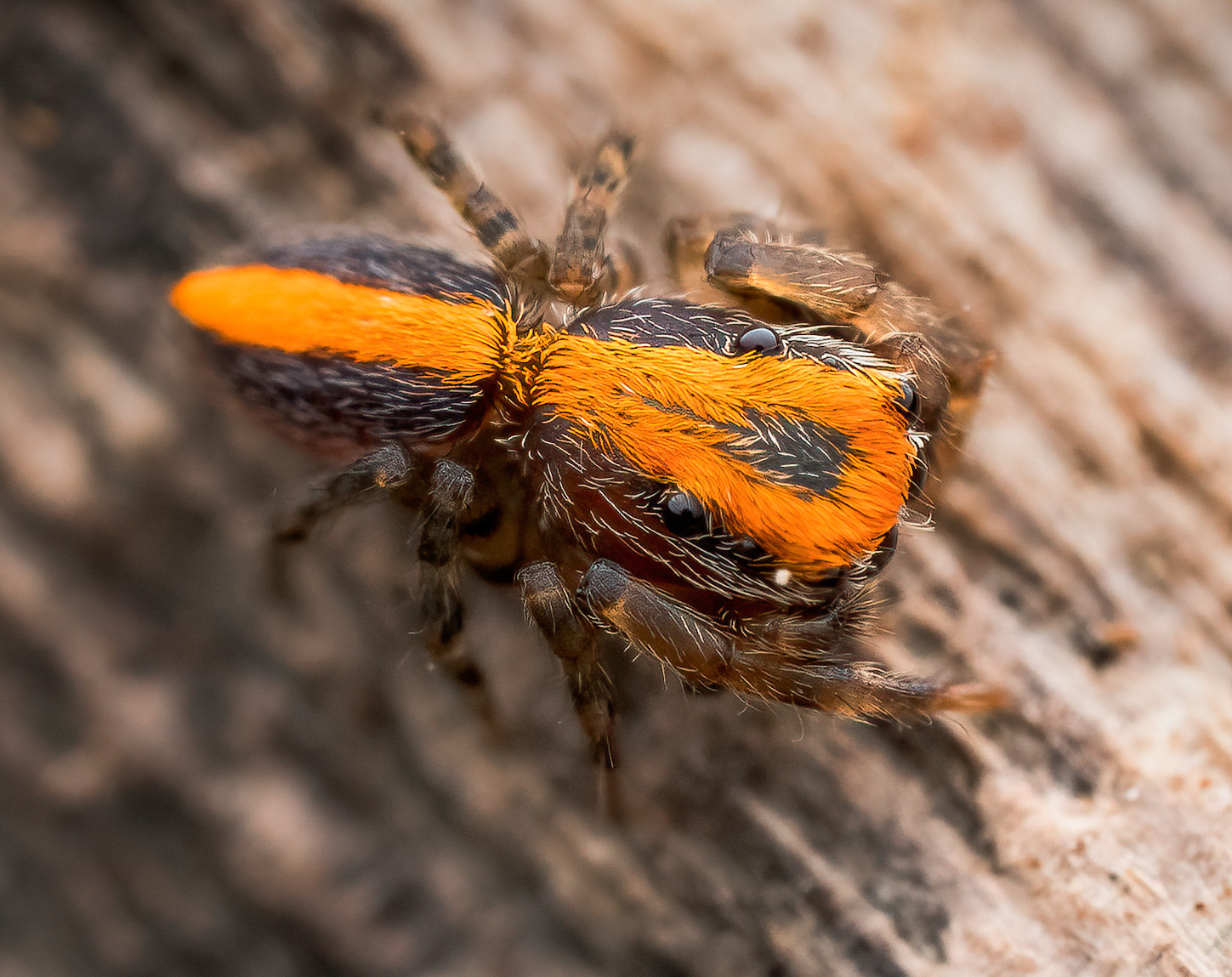
- L. pixi in Malaysia

Scientific classification
- Kingdom: Animalia
- Phylum: Arthropoda
- Subphylum: Chelicerata
- Class: Arachnida
- Order: Araneae
- Infraorder: Araneomorphae
- Family: Salticidae
- Genus: Lokina; Yu, Maddison & Zhang, 2023

Type species
- L. chiyou Yu & Zhang, 2023

Species
- 11, see text

= Lokina =

Genus of spiders

Lokina is a genus of spiders in the family Salticidae.

== Distribution ==
Lokina occurs in China and Borneo.

== Etymology ==
The genus name refers to Norse god Loki, indicating the relationship to genus Laufeia Simon, 1889, which was possible named after Lokis father, Laufey.

== Species ==
As of January 2026, this genus includes eleven species:

- Lokina blombergi Yu, Maddison & Zhang, 2023 – Malaysia (Borneo)
- Lokina chiyou Yu & Zhang, 2023 – China
- Lokina eximia (Zhang & Maddison, 2012) – China
- Lokina fuxi Yu & Zhang, 2023 – China
- Lokina kubah Yu, Maddison & Zhang, 2023 – Malaysia (Borneo)
- Lokina nyuewa Yu & Zhang, 2023 – China
- Lokina pixi Yu, Maddison & Zhang, 2023 – Malaysia (Borneo)
- Lokina tamasi Yu & Zhang, 2023 – China
- Lokina tengchongensis (Lei & Peng, 2012) – China
- Lokina wuyi Yu & Zhang, 2023 – China
- Lokina zhishengi Yu & Zhang, 2023 – China
