= Junxattus =

Scientific classification
- Kingdom: Animalia
- Phylum: Arthropoda
- Subphylum: Chelicerata
- Class: Arachnida
- Order: Araneae
- Infraorder: Araneomorphae
- Family: Salticidae
- Genus: Junxattus; Prószyński & Deeleman-Reinhold, 2012
- Species: J. daiqini

Binomial name
- Junxattus daiqini Prószyński & Deeleman-Reinhold, 2012

Genus of jumping spiders

Junxattus is a monotypic genus of southeast Asian jumping spiders native to Sumatra. It contains the single species, Junxattus daiqini, first described by Jerzy Prószyński and Christa Deeleman-Reinhold in 2012. The genus was placed in the subfamily Euophryinae, the equivalent of the tribe Euophryini.

In 2015, Junxia Zhang and Wayne Maddison rejected the genus, placing the species in Laufeia. The genus was re-validated by Prószyński in 2019, and it is accepted by the World Spider Catalog as of March 2022.

== See also ==
- Laufeia
- List of Salticidae genera
