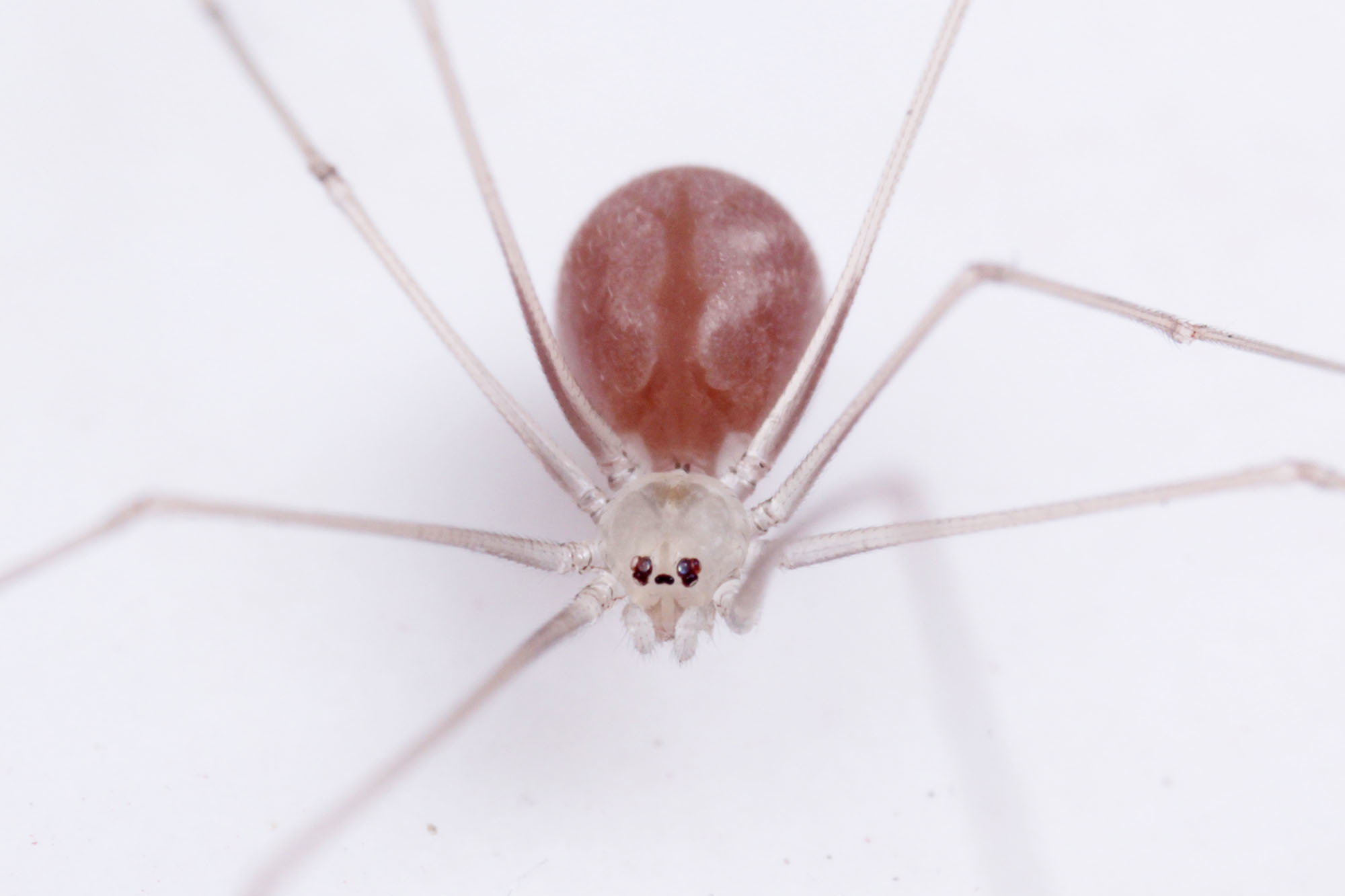
- Micropholcus fauroti

Scientific classification
- Kingdom: Animalia
- Phylum: Arthropoda
- Subphylum: Chelicerata
- Class: Arachnida
- Order: Araneae
- Infraorder: Araneomorphae
- Family: Pholcidae
- Genus: Micropholcus; Deeleman-Reinhold & Prinsen, 1987

Type species
- M. fauroti (Simon, 1887)

Species
- 17, see text

Synonyms
- Mariguitaia González-Sponga, 2004

= Micropholcus =

Genus of spiders

Micropholcus is a genus of cellar spiders that was first described by Christa Laetitia Deeleman-Reinhold & J. D. Prinsen in 1987.

== Species ==
It accepted a number of transfers from genus Leptopholcus in 2014, increasing its number of species to 15. As of November 2021 it contains 17 species, with a pantropical distribution:

- Micropholcus agadir (Huber, 2011) – Morocco
- Micropholcus baoruco (Huber, 2006) – Hispaniola
- Micropholcus brazlandia (Huber, Pérez & Baptista, 2005) – Brazil
- Micropholcus crato Huber, Carvalho & Benjamin, 2014 – Brazil
- Micropholcus dalei (Petrunkevitch, 1929) – Puerto Rico, Virgin Is.
- Micropholcus delicatulus (Franganillo, 1930) – Cuba
- Micropholcus evaluna (Huber, Pérez & Baptista, 2005) – Venezuela
- Micropholcus fauroti (Simon, 1887) (type) – Temperate Asia. Introduced to both Americas, Belgium, Germany, Africa, Sri Lanka, Southeast Asia, Australia, Pacific Is.
- Micropholcus hispaniola (Huber, 2000) – Hispaniola
- Micropholcus jacominae Deeleman-Reinhold & van Harten, 2001 – Yemen
- Micropholcus jamaica (Huber, 2000) – Jamaica
- Micropholcus pataxo (Huber, Pérez & Baptista, 2005) – Brazil
- Micropholcus piaui Huber, Carvalho & Benjamin, 2014 – Brazil
- Micropholcus piracuruca Huber, Carvalho & Benjamin, 2014 – Brazil
- Micropholcus tegulifer (Barrientos, 2019) – Morocco
- Micropholcus toma (Huber, 2006) – Hispaniola
- Micropholcus ubajara Huber, Carvalho & Benjamin, 2014 – Brazil

== See also ==
- List of Pholcidae species
