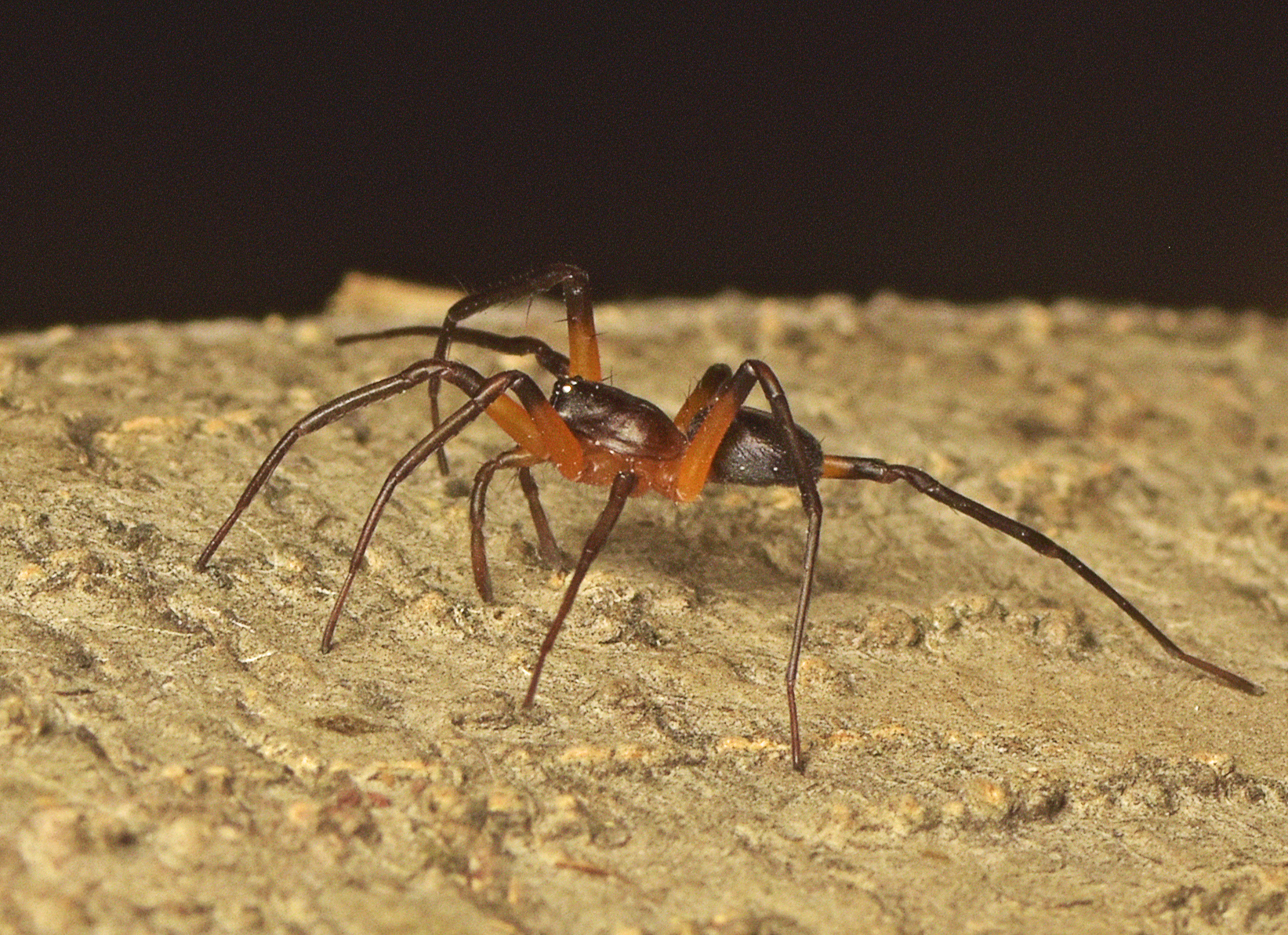
- M. semiaurantiaca
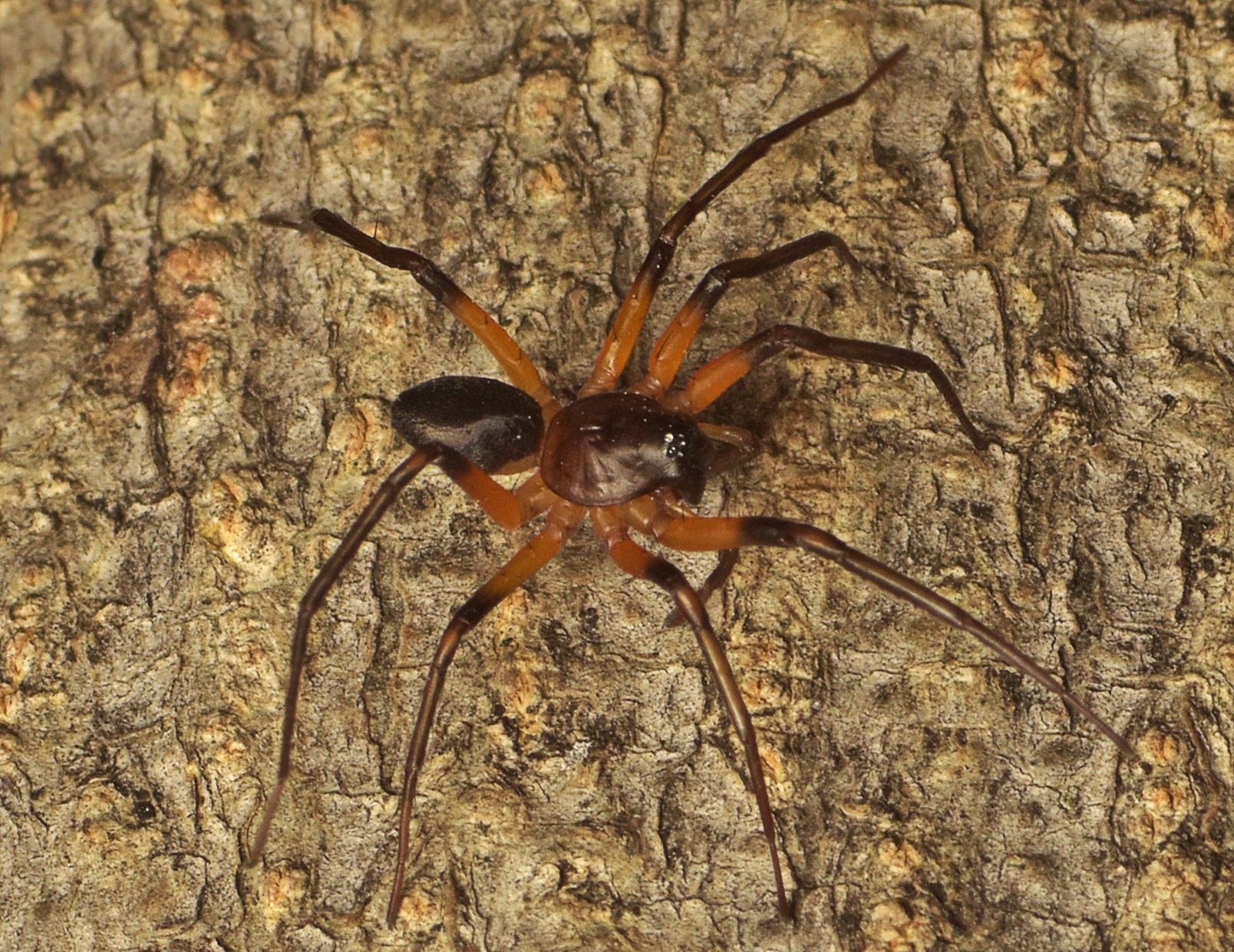
- M. semiaurantiaca

Scientific classification
- Kingdom: Animalia
- Phylum: Arthropoda
- Subphylum: Chelicerata
- Class: Arachnida
- Order: Araneae
- Infraorder: Araneomorphae
- Family: Corinnidae
- Genus: Medmassa; Simon, 1887

Type species
- M. frenata (Simon, 1877)

Species
- 10, see text

Synonyms
- Astratea Thorell, 1890

= Medmassa =

Genus of spiders

Medmassa is a genus of corinnid sac spiders first described by Eugène Simon in 1887 under the name "Megaera", later renamed because "Megaera" was already in use as a synonym of the reptile genus Trimeresurus.

== Species ==
As of September 2025 it contains 13 species:

- Medmassa celebensis (Deeleman-Reinhold, 1995) – Indonesia (Sulawesi)
- Medmassa christae Raven, 2015 – Australia (Queensland)
- Medmassa diplogale Deeleman-Reinhold, 2001 – Borneo
- Medmassa frenata (Simon, 1877) (type) – Philippines
- Medmassa insignis (Thorell, 1890) – Indonesia (Sumatra, Borneo)
- Medmassa kltina (Barrion & Litsinger, 1995) – Philippines
- Medmassa lingshui Lu & Li, 2023 – China (Hainan)
- Medmassa postica Kadam, Tripathi & Sankaran, 2024 – India
- Medmassa pulchra (Thorell, 1881) – New Guinea
- Medmassa sagax Tripathi, Kadam & Sankaran, 2024 – India
- Medmassa semiaurantiaca Simon, 1910 – Guinea-Bissau, Ghana, Central African Rep., Ethiopia, DR Congo, Kenya, Botswana, South Africa
- Medmassa tigris (Deeleman-Reinhold, 1995) – Indonesia (Sumatra, Borneo)
- Medmassa torta Jin, H. Zhang & F. Zhang, 2019 – China (Hainan)
