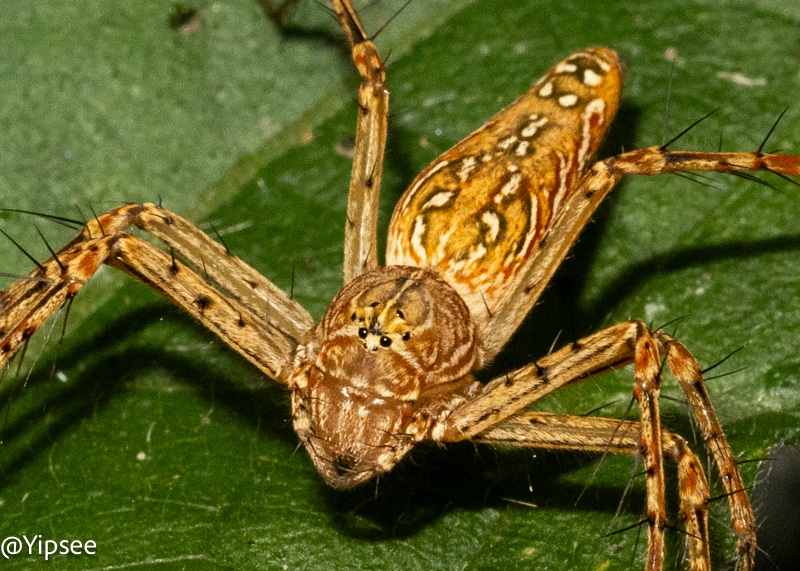
- female from Thailand
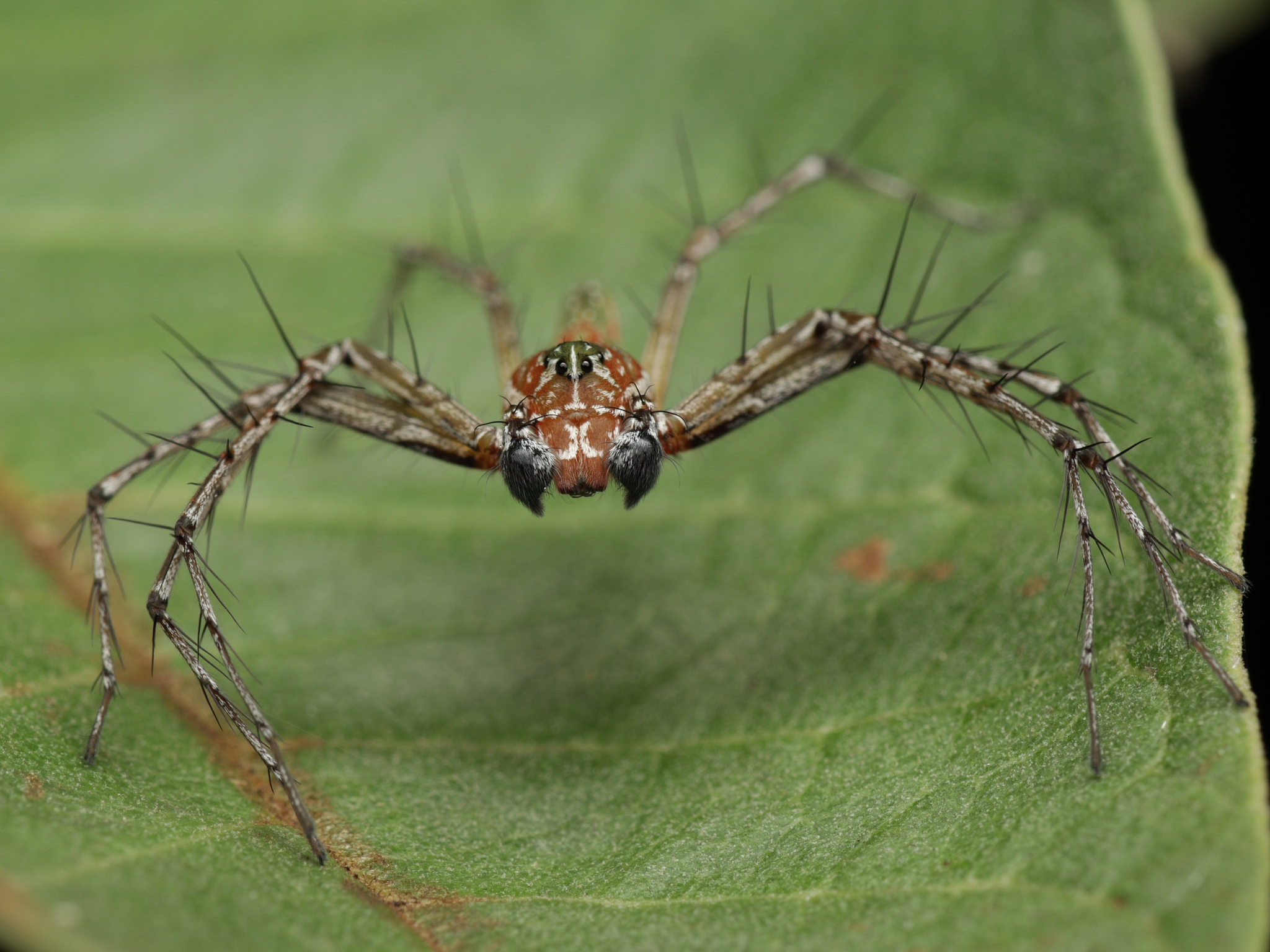
- male from India

Scientific classification
- Kingdom: Animalia
- Phylum: Arthropoda
- Subphylum: Chelicerata
- Class: Arachnida
- Order: Araneae
- Infraorder: Araneomorphae
- Family: Oxyopidae
- Genus: Hamadruas
- Species: H. hieroglyphica

Binomial name
- Hamadruas hieroglyphica (Thorell, 1887)

Synonyms
- Oxyopes hieroglyphicus Thorell, 1887; Tapponia insulana Thorell, 1891; Tapponia hieroglyphica Thorell, 1895; Hamadruas insulana Deeleman-Reinhold, 2009

= Hamadruas hieroglyphica =

Hieroglyph Fairy Lynx Spider

Species of lynx spider

Hamadruas hieroglyphica is a species of lynx spider in the family Oxyopidae. It was originally described by Tamerlan Thorell in 1887 as Oxyopes hieroglyphicus.

== Taxonomy ==
The species was first described by Thorell in 1887 from specimens collected in Myanmar (then Burma). The male was first described by Deeleman-Reinhold in 2009, who also transferred the species to the genus Hamadruas.

The species name hieroglyphica derives from the Greek words meaning "sacred carving," likely referring to the distinctive markings on the spider's body that resemble hieroglyphic symbols.

== Distribution ==
H. hieroglyphica is distributed across South and Southeast Asia, with confirmed records from India, Myanmar, China, and Taiwan. The species was newly recorded from Taiwan in 2024.

== Description ==
Hamadruas hieroglyphica is a medium-sized lynx spider with pronounced sexual dimorphism in both size and coloration.

=== Female ===
Female total body length is about 13-15 mm. The carapace is yellowish brown with a black eye region and dense radiating stripes. The abdomen is long and oval-shaped, yellowish brown in color with indistinct cardiac markings, scattered dark spots and lines, and five to six pairs of conspicuous pale spots. The legs are yellowish and clothed with many long spines, with the femora bearing distinctive black stripes.

The female epigyne features a large central depression with a sclerotized circle-shaped posterior edge. The spermathecae are round and visible through the cuticle, while the copulatory ducts are curved and the fertilization ducts are long and slender.

=== Male ===
Males are considerably smaller than females, measuring 7-8 mm in total length. While similar in overall body shape and pattern to females, males display brighter white spots on the dorsal carapace and abdomen, and the dorsal abdomen appears dark green. The cymbium and tibia of the pedipalps are black.

The male palp is distinctive, with a column-shaped ventral retrolateral tibial apophysis and a larger, chunk-shaped dorsal retrolateral tibial apophysis.
