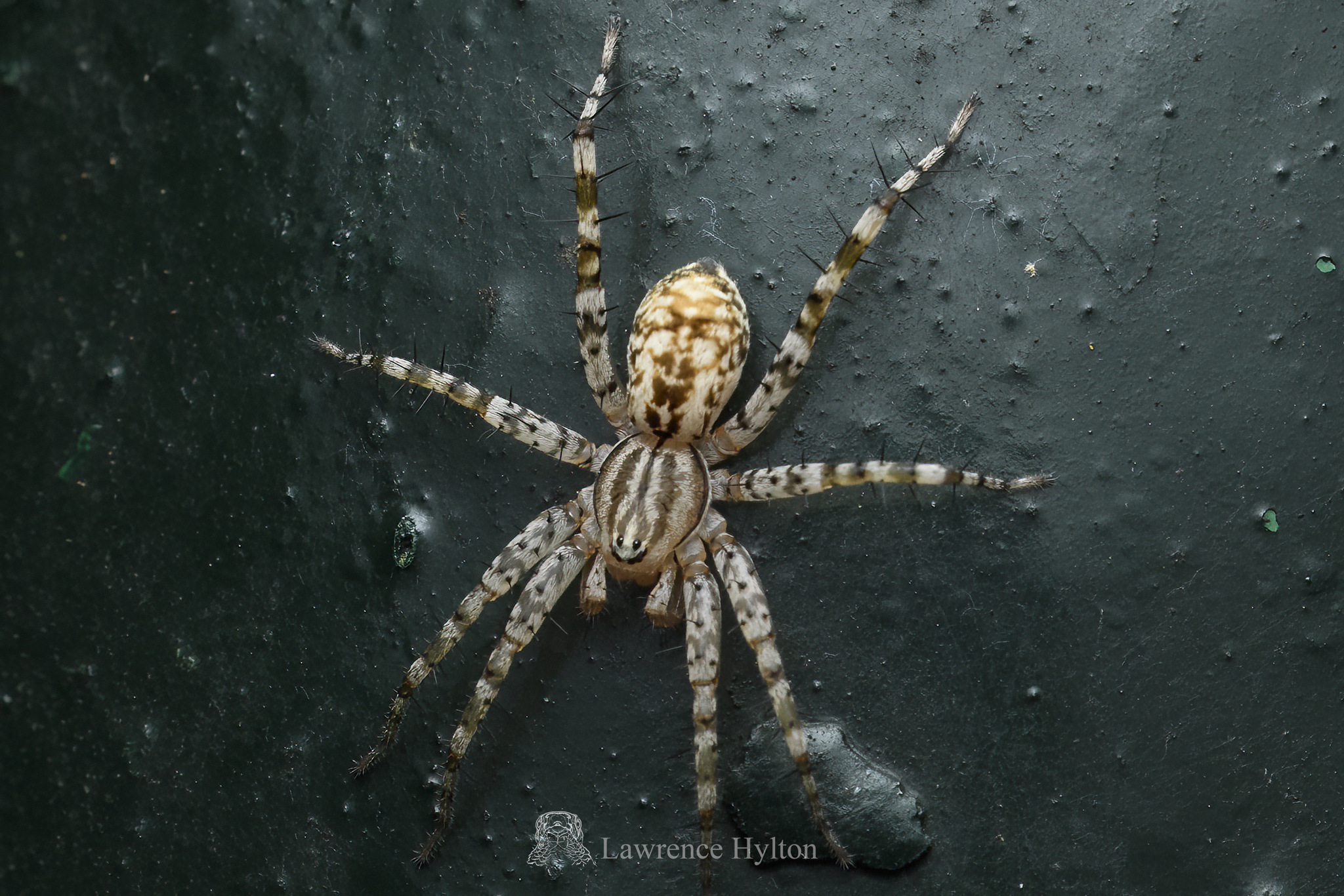
- E. panache from Hong Kong
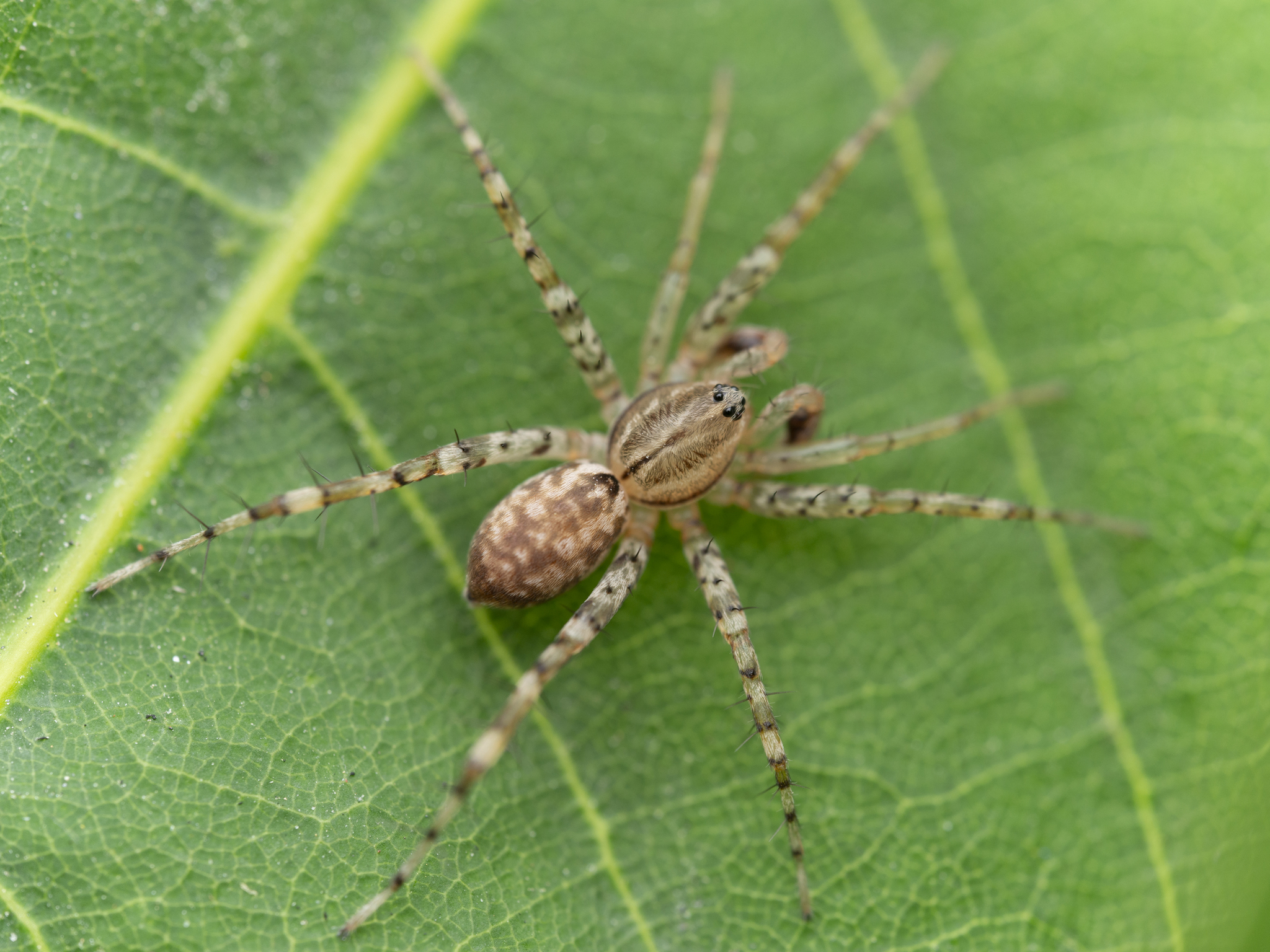
- E. panache

Scientific classification
- Kingdom: Animalia
- Phylum: Arthropoda
- Subphylum: Chelicerata
- Class: Arachnida
- Order: Araneae
- Infraorder: Araneomorphae
- Family: Corinnidae
- Genus: Echinax; Deeleman-Reinhold, 2001

Type species
- E. oxyopoides (Deeleman-Reinhold, 1995)

Species
- 15, see text

= Echinax =

Genus of spiders

Echinax is a genus of Asian and African corinnid sac spiders first described by Christa L. Deeleman-Reinhold in 2001.

== Species ==
As of October 2025, this genus includes fifteen species:

- Echinax anlongensis Yang, Song & Zhu, 2004 – China
- Echinax baisha Lu & Li, 2023 – China (Hainan)
- Echinax bosmansi (Deeleman-Reinhold, 1995) – Indonesia (Sulawesi)
- Echinax breviducta L. Zhang & F. Zhang, 2023 – China
- Echinax clara Haddad, 2012 – Ghana, DR Congo
- Echinax hesperis Haddad, 2012 – Ivory Coast
- Echinax javana (Deeleman-Reinhold, 1995) – Indonesia (Java)
- Echinax longespina (Simon, 1909) – Senegal, Guinea-Bissau, Liberia, Ivory Coast, Ghana, Gabon, DR Congo, Uganda, Kenya, Tanzania
- Echinax natalensis Haddad, 2012 – South Africa
- Echinax oxyopoides (Deeleman-Reinhold, 1995) – China, Malaysia (Borneo), Indonesia (Sumatra, Borneo) (type species)
- Echinax panache Deeleman-Reinhold, 2001 – India, China, Thailand
- Echinax scharffi Haddad, 2012 – Tanzania
- Echinax similis Haddad, 2012 – South Africa
- Echinax spatulata Haddad, 2012 – Guinea, Ivory Coast, Ghana, Togo, Cameroon, Central African Rep. DR Congo, Kenya, Rwanda, Burundi, Tanzania
- Echinax wuzhishan L. Zhang & F. Zhang, 2023 – China (Hainan)
