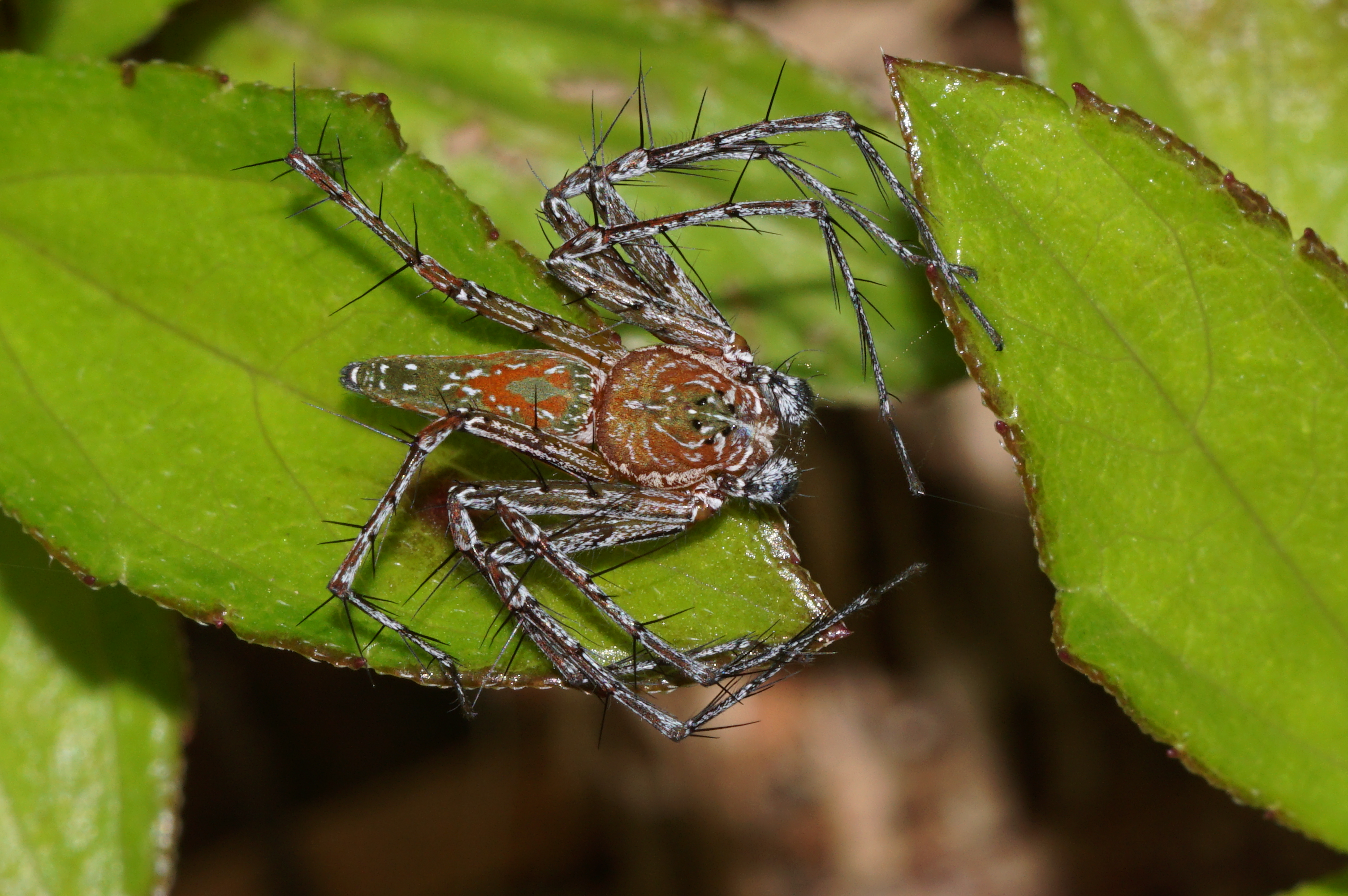
- Hamadruas sp. near Chemancheri, Kerala

Scientific classification
- Kingdom: Animalia
- Phylum: Arthropoda
- Subphylum: Chelicerata
- Class: Arachnida
- Order: Araneae
- Infraorder: Araneomorphae
- Family: Oxyopidae
- Genus: Hamadruas; Deeleman-Reinhold, 2009

Type species
- H. hieroglyphica (Thorell, 1887)

Species
- 9, see text

= Hamadruas =

Genus of spiders

Hamadruas is a genus of Asian lynx spiders that was first described by Christa Laetitia Deeleman-Reinhold in 2009.

== Species ==
As of June 2019 it contains nine species with an Indo-Malayan distribution:

- Hamadruas austera (Thorell, 1894) – Singapore
- Hamadruas heterosticta (Pocock, 1897) – Indonesia (Sulawesi, Moluccas)
- Hamadruas hieroglyphica (Thorell, 1887) (type) – China, Myanmar
- Hamadruas insulana (Thorell, 1891) – India (Nicobar Is.)
- Hamadruas keralensis Sen & Sudhin, 2023 – India
- Hamadruas pupulus (Thorell, 1890) – Indonesia (Nias Is.)
- Hamadruas severa (Thorell, 1895) – Myanmar, Indonesia (Lombok)
- Hamadruas signifera (Doleschall, 1859) – Indonesia (Java)
- Hamadruas sikkimensis (Tikader, 1970) – India, Bangladesh, China
- Hamadruas superba (Thorell, 1887) – Myanmar, Thailand, Indonesia (Borneo)
