= Dolichognatha erwini =

Scientific classification
- Domain: Eukaryota
- Kingdom: Animalia
- Phylum: Arthropoda
- Subphylum: Chelicerata
- Class: Arachnida
- Order: Araneae
- Infraorder: Araneomorphae
- Family: Tetragnathidae
- Genus: Dolichognatha
- Species: D. erwini

Binomial name
- Dolichognatha erwini Brescovit & Cunha, 2001

Species of spider

Dolichognatha erwini is a species of spider in the family Tetragnathidae, found in Brazil.
