= Dolichognatha cygnea =

Scientific classification
- Kingdom: Animalia
- Phylum: Arthropoda
- Subphylum: Chelicerata
- Class: Arachnida
- Order: Araneae
- Infraorder: Araneomorphae
- Family: Tetragnathidae
- Genus: Dolichognatha
- Species: D. cygnea

Binomial name
- Dolichognatha cygnea (Simon, 1893)

Species of spider

Dolichognatha cygnea is a species of spider in the family Tetragnathidae, found in Venezuela.
