= Stergusa aurichalcea =

Scientific classification
- Kingdom: Animalia
- Phylum: Arthropoda
- Subphylum: Chelicerata
- Class: Arachnida
- Order: Araneae
- Infraorder: Araneomorphae
- Family: Salticidae
- Genus: Stergusa
- Species: S. aurichalcea

Binomial name
- Stergusa aurichalcea Simon, 1902

Species of spider

Stergusa aurichalcea is a species of spider of the genus Stergusa. It is endemic to Sri Lanka.
