= Dolichognatha tigrina =

Scientific classification
- Kingdom: Animalia
- Phylum: Arthropoda
- Subphylum: Chelicerata
- Class: Arachnida
- Order: Araneae
- Infraorder: Araneomorphae
- Family: Tetragnathidae
- Genus: Dolichognatha
- Species: D. tigrina

Binomial name
- Dolichognatha tigrina Simon, 1893

Species of spider

Dolichognatha tigrina is a species of long-jawed orb weaver in the spider family Tetragnathidae. It is found in the Caribbean and northern South America.
