= Dolichognatha aethiopica =

Scientific classification
- Domain: Eukaryota
- Kingdom: Animalia
- Phylum: Arthropoda
- Subphylum: Chelicerata
- Class: Arachnida
- Order: Araneae
- Infraorder: Araneomorphae
- Family: Tetragnathidae
- Genus: Dolichognatha
- Species: D. aethiopica

Binomial name
- Dolichognatha aethiopica Tullgren, 1910

Species of spider

Dolichognatha aethiopica is a species of spider in the family Tetragnathidae, found in East Africa.
