= Laufeia aerihirta =

Conservation status
- Data Deficient (NZ TCS)

Scientific classification
- Kingdom: Animalia
- Phylum: Arthropoda
- Subphylum: Chelicerata
- Class: Arachnida
- Order: Araneae
- Infraorder: Araneomorphae
- Family: Salticidae
- Genus: Laufeia
- Species: L. aerihirta

Binomial name
- Laufeia aerihirta (Urquhart, 1888)

Synonyms
- Marpissa aeri-hirta

Species of spider

Laufeia aerihirta is a species of jumping spider that is endemic to New Zealand.

== Taxonomy ==
This species was described at Marpissa aeri-hirta by Arthur Urquhart from a female specimen. It was transferred to the Laufeia genus in 1935.

== Description ==
The female is recorded at 4.5mm in length. The cephalothorax is coloured blackish brown with black and copper coloured hairs. The legs abdomen is black brown and covered in black and copper yellow hairs.

== Distribution ==
This species is only known from Karaka, New Zealand.

== Conservation status ==
Under the New Zealand Threat Classification System, this species is listed as "Data Deficient" with the qualifiers of "Data Poor: Size", "Data Poor: Trend" and "One Location".
