= Echinax natalensis =

Natal pale lycosiform sac spider

Scientific classification
- Kingdom: Animalia
- Phylum: Arthropoda
- Subphylum: Chelicerata
- Class: Arachnida
- Order: Araneae
- Infraorder: Araneomorphae
- Family: Corinnidae
- Genus: Echinax
- Species: E. natalensis

Binomial name
- Echinax natalensis Haddad, 2012

Species of spider

Echinax natalensis is a species of spider in the family Corinnidae. It is endemic to South Africa and is commonly known as the Natal pale lycosiform sac spider.

== Distribution ==
Echinax natalensis is endemic to South Africa and has been recorded from two provinces: Eastern Cape and KwaZulu-Natal at altitudes ranging from 4 to 381 m above sea level.

The species occurs in several protected areas including iSimangaliso Wetland Park, Ndumo Game Reserve, and Mount Coke State Forest.

== Habitat and ecology ==
Echinax natalensis has been collected from tsetse fly traps set up in coastal forest, canopy fogging, and beating of trees in riparian forest and savanna habitats. The species inhabits the Indian Ocean Coastal Belt and Savanna biomes.

== Description ==
Echinax natalensis is known from both sexes. As a member of its genus, it is a small spider that resembles Copa and Copuetta in general body shape, with heavily spined legs and cryptic coloration that resembles wolf spiders.

== Conservation ==
Echinax natalensis is listed as Least Concern by the South African National Biodiversity Institute. There are no significant threats to the species, and it has been recorded from several protected areas.

== Taxonomy ==
The species was described by Charles R. Haddad in 2012 from the iSimangaliso Wetland Park.
