= Dolichognatha lodiculafaciens =

Scientific classification
- Domain: Eukaryota
- Kingdom: Animalia
- Phylum: Arthropoda
- Subphylum: Chelicerata
- Class: Arachnida
- Order: Araneae
- Infraorder: Araneomorphae
- Family: Tetragnathidae
- Genus: Dolichognatha
- Species: D. lodiculafaciens

Binomial name
- Dolichognatha lodiculafaciens Hingston, 1932

Species of spider

Dolichognatha lodiculafaciens is a species of spider in the family Tetragnathidae, found in Guyana.
