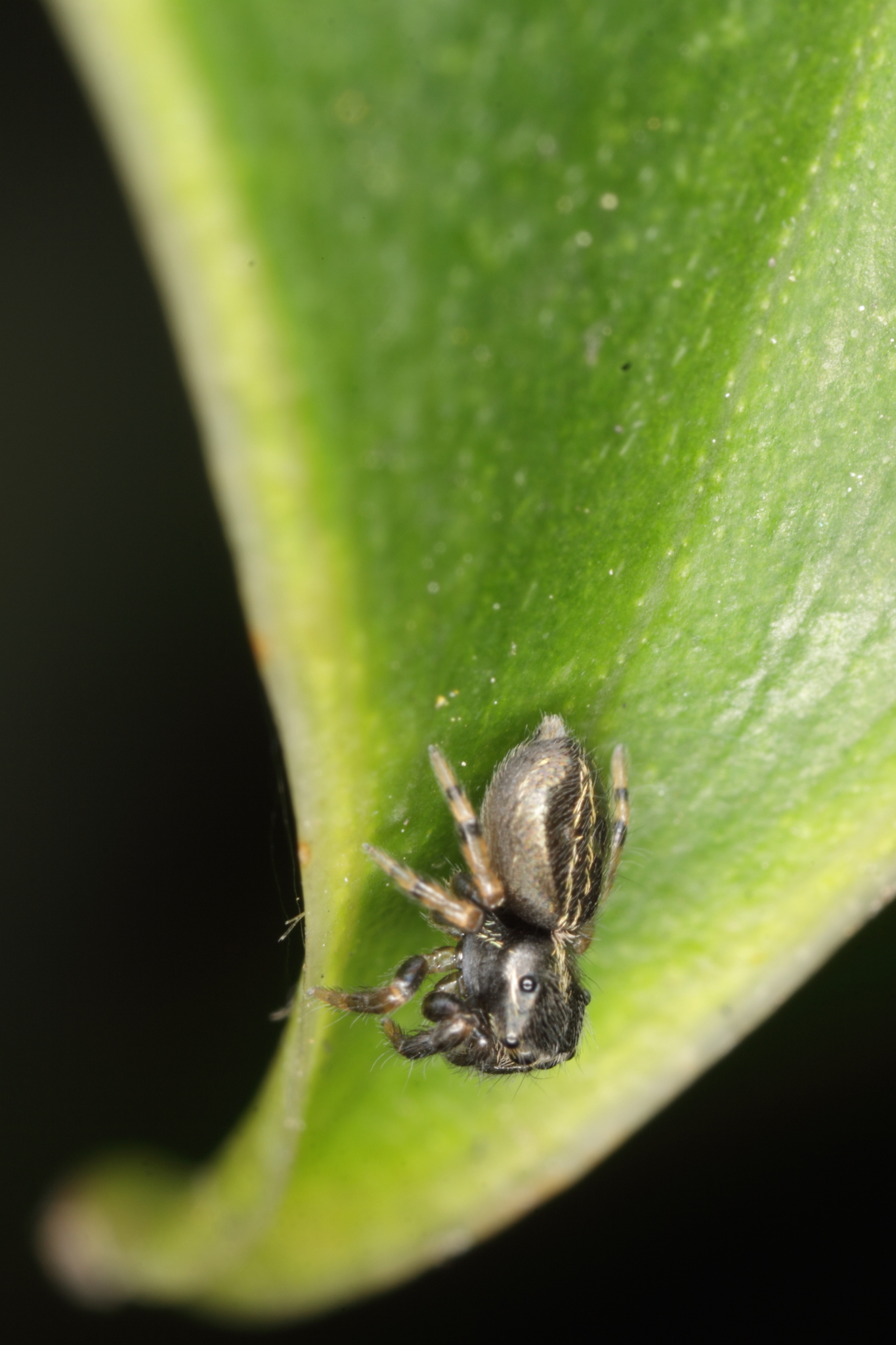
- female from Indonesia

Scientific classification
- Kingdom: Animalia
- Phylum: Arthropoda
- Subphylum: Chelicerata
- Class: Arachnida
- Order: Araneae
- Infraorder: Araneomorphae
- Family: Salticidae
- Genus: Chalcovietnamicus
- Species: C. vietnamensis

Binomial name
- Chalcovietnamicus vietnamensis (Żabka, 1985)

Synonyms
- Chalcoscirtus vietnamensis Żabka, 1985; Chalcoscirtus (Chalcovietnamicus) vietnamensis Marusik, 1991

= Chalcovietnamicus vietnamensis =

Species of spider

Chalcovietnamicus vietnamensis is a species of jumping spider in the genus Chalcovietnamicus of the family Salticidae. It was originally described as Chalcoscirtus vietnamensis by Żabka in 1985 and later transferred to the genus Chalcovietnamicus by Logunov in 2020. The species is found in Vietnam and Singapore.

== Taxonomy ==
The species was first described by Marek Żabka in 1985 as Chalcoscirtus vietnamensis based on a male holotype from Hanoi, Vietnam. In 1991, Marusik placed it in the subgenus Chalcoscirtus (Chalcovietnamicus). In 2020, Logunov transferred the species to the genus Chalcovietnamicus, establishing its current taxonomic placement. The female was first described by Yu et al. in 2023 based on specimens from both Vietnam and Singapore.

== Distribution ==
C. vietnamensis has been recorded from several provinces in Vietnam, including Bac Giang, Dak Lak, and Hanoi. The species has also been found in Singapore at the Sungei Buloh Wetland Reserve.

== Habitat ==
In Vietnam, specimens have been found on tree trunks, hiding in small silk cocoons built in crevices of bark. In Singapore, the species has been observed in large grass tussocks in open habitats near mangroves.

== Description ==
Chalcovietnamicus vietnamensis is a small jumping spider with subtle sexual dimorphism. Males have a carapace length of approximately 1.4 mm and an opisthosoma length of about 1.5 mm. Females are slightly larger, with carapace lengths around 1.5 mm and abdomen lengths of about 1.6 mm.

The body is predominantly black, with the metatarsus and tarsus showing dark reddish coloration, while the patellae to tarsi of legs II-IV are gray-pink. The tibiae of legs II-IV have dark bands (annuli) at their distal ends. Golden setal bands are present on the dorsal axis and posterior lateral edge of the abdomen, with the abdominal axis band being hollow.

Males can be distinguished from the closely related C. lii by the presence of a distal retro-ventral keel on the embolus and a dorsal extension on the distal part of the retrolateral tibial apophysis. The male pedipalp has a cymbium that is slightly longer than the palpal bulb, with a lamina-like cymbial process.

Females have extremely short copulatory ducts and small accessory glands that are hidden at the base of the fertilization ducts, making them invisible in ventral view of the rounded spermathecae. Unlike males, females possess golden setal bands on both the lateral sides of the carapace and abdomen.
