= Dolichognatha ducke =

Scientific classification
- Kingdom: Animalia
- Phylum: Arthropoda
- Subphylum: Chelicerata
- Class: Arachnida
- Order: Araneae
- Infraorder: Araneomorphae
- Family: Tetragnathidae
- Genus: Dolichognatha
- Species: D. ducke

Binomial name
- Dolichognatha ducke Lise, 1993

Species of spider

Dolichognatha ducke is a species of spider in the family Tetragnathidae, found in Brazil.
