= Deelemanella =

Scientific classification
- Kingdom: Animalia
- Phylum: Arthropoda
- Subphylum: Chelicerata
- Class: Arachnida
- Order: Araneae
- Infraorder: Araneomorphae
- Family: Theridiidae
- Genus: Deelemanella; Yoshida, 2003
- Species: D. borneo

Binomial name
- Deelemanella borneo Yoshida, 2003

Genus of spiders

Deelemanella is a monotypic genus of comb-footed spiders containing the single species, Deelemanella borneo. It was first described by H. Yoshida in 2003, and is found on Borneo. This genus was named after the Dutch arachnologist Christa L. Deeleman-Reinhold.
