= Echinax similis =

Scientific classification
- Kingdom: Animalia
- Phylum: Arthropoda
- Subphylum: Chelicerata
- Class: Arachnida
- Order: Araneae
- Infraorder: Araneomorphae
- Family: Corinnidae
- Genus: Echinax
- Species: E. similis

Binomial name
- Echinax similis Haddad, 2012

Species of spider

Echinax similis is a species of spider in the family Corinnidae. It is endemic to KwaZulu-Natal, South Africa.

== Distribution ==
Echinax similis is endemic to KwaZulu-Natal, South Africa and is known only from the type locality at Ndumo Game Reserve at an altitude of 51 m above sea level.

== Habitat and ecology ==
Echinax similis was collected by canopy fogging from three broad-leaved tree species in seasonally inundated Ficus sycomorus forest in the Savanna biome.

== Description ==
Echinax similis is known from both sexes. As a member of its genus, it is a small spider that resembles Copa and Copuetta in general body shape, with heavily spined legs and cryptic coloration that resembles wolf spiders.

== Conservation ==
Echinax similis is listed as Data Deficient due to its apparently restricted distribution. The species may be undersampled and is expected to occur more widely. Although the area is well sampled with standard methods, canopy fogging is still not commonly used and that may be the reason for its apparently restricted distribution. More sampling is needed to determine the species' range. There are no significant threats to the species.

== Taxonomy ==
The species was described by Charles Haddad in 2012 from Ndumo Game Reserve.
