= Dolichognatha incanescens =

Scientific classification
- Kingdom: Animalia
- Phylum: Arthropoda
- Subphylum: Chelicerata
- Class: Arachnida
- Order: Araneae
- Infraorder: Araneomorphae
- Family: Tetragnathidae
- Genus: Dolichognatha
- Species: D. incanescens

Binomial name
- Dolichognatha incanescens (Simon, 1895)

Species of spider

Dolichognatha incanescens is a species of spider in the family Tetragnathidae, found in Sri Lanka, Borneo, New Guinea and Queensland, Australia.
