= Dolichognatha mandibularis =

Scientific classification
- Domain: Eukaryota
- Kingdom: Animalia
- Phylum: Arthropoda
- Subphylum: Chelicerata
- Class: Arachnida
- Order: Araneae
- Infraorder: Araneomorphae
- Family: Tetragnathidae
- Genus: Dolichognatha
- Species: D. mandibularis

Binomial name
- Dolichognatha mandibularis (Thorell, 1894)

Synonyms
- Paraebius mandibularis Thorell, 1894

Species of spider

Dolichognatha mandibularis is a species of spider in the family Tetragnathidae, found in Sumatra.
