= Dolichognatha albida =

Scientific classification
- Kingdom: Animalia
- Phylum: Arthropoda
- Subphylum: Chelicerata
- Class: Arachnida
- Order: Araneae
- Infraorder: Araneomorphae
- Family: Tetragnathidae
- Genus: Dolichognatha
- Species: D. albida

Binomial name
- Dolichognatha albida (Simon, 1895)

Species of spider

Dolichognatha albida is a species of spider in the family Tetragnathidae, found in Sri Lanka and Thailand.
