= Molione kinabalu =

Scientific classification
- Kingdom: Animalia
- Phylum: Arthropoda
- Subphylum: Chelicerata
- Class: Arachnida
- Order: Araneae
- Infraorder: Araneomorphae
- Family: Theridiidae
- Genus: Molione
- Species: M. kinabalu

Binomial name
- Molione kinabalu Yoshida, 2003

Species of spider

Molione kinabalu is a species of comb-footed spider in the family Theridiidae. It is found in Borneo and China.
