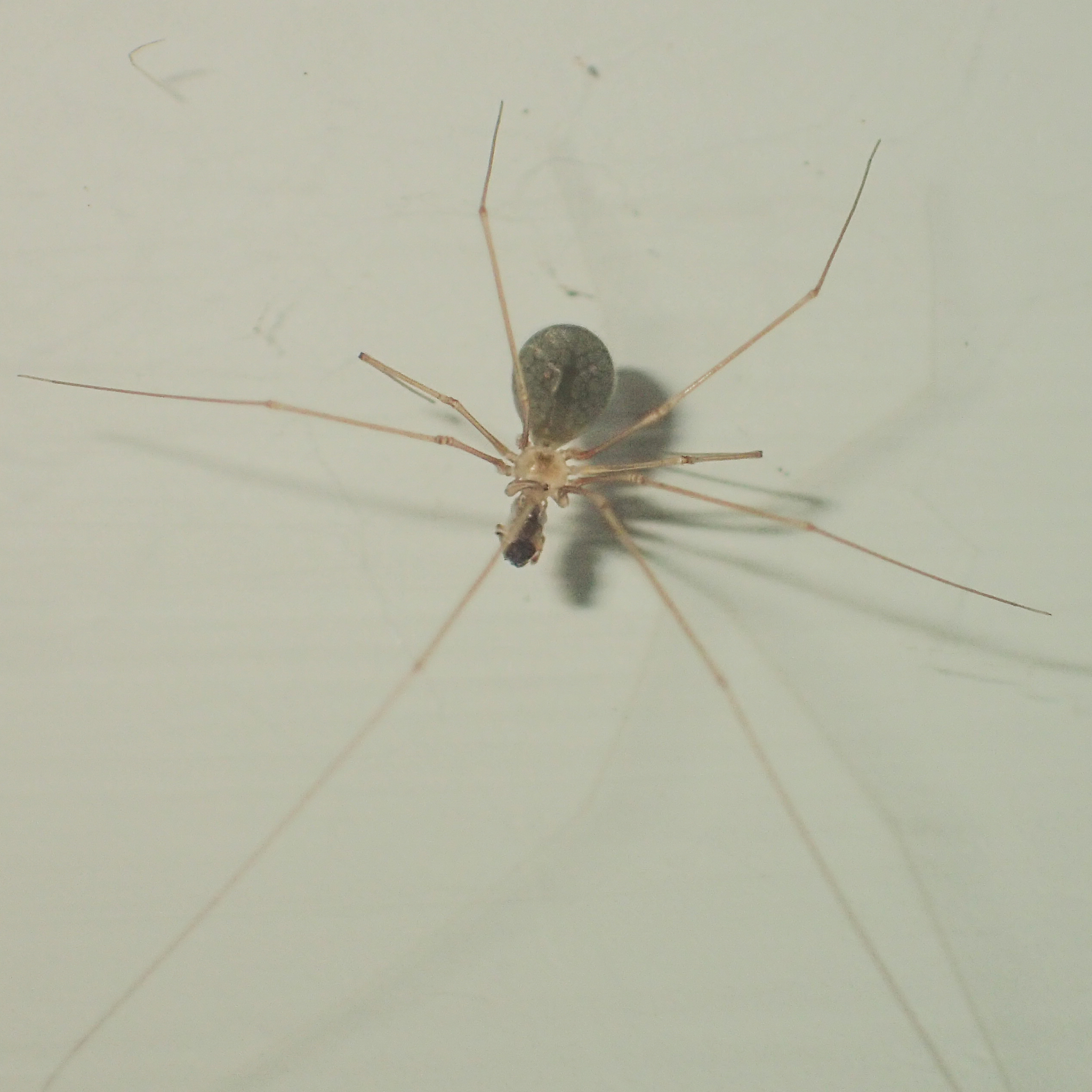

Scientific classification
- Kingdom: Animalia
- Phylum: Arthropoda
- Subphylum: Chelicerata
- Class: Arachnida
- Order: Araneae
- Infraorder: Araneomorphae
- Family: Pholcidae
- Genus: Micropholcus
- Species: M. fauroti

Binomial name
- Micropholcus fauroti (Simon, 1887)

Synonyms
- Pholcus fauroti Simon, 1887

= Micropholcus fauroti =

Species of cellar spider

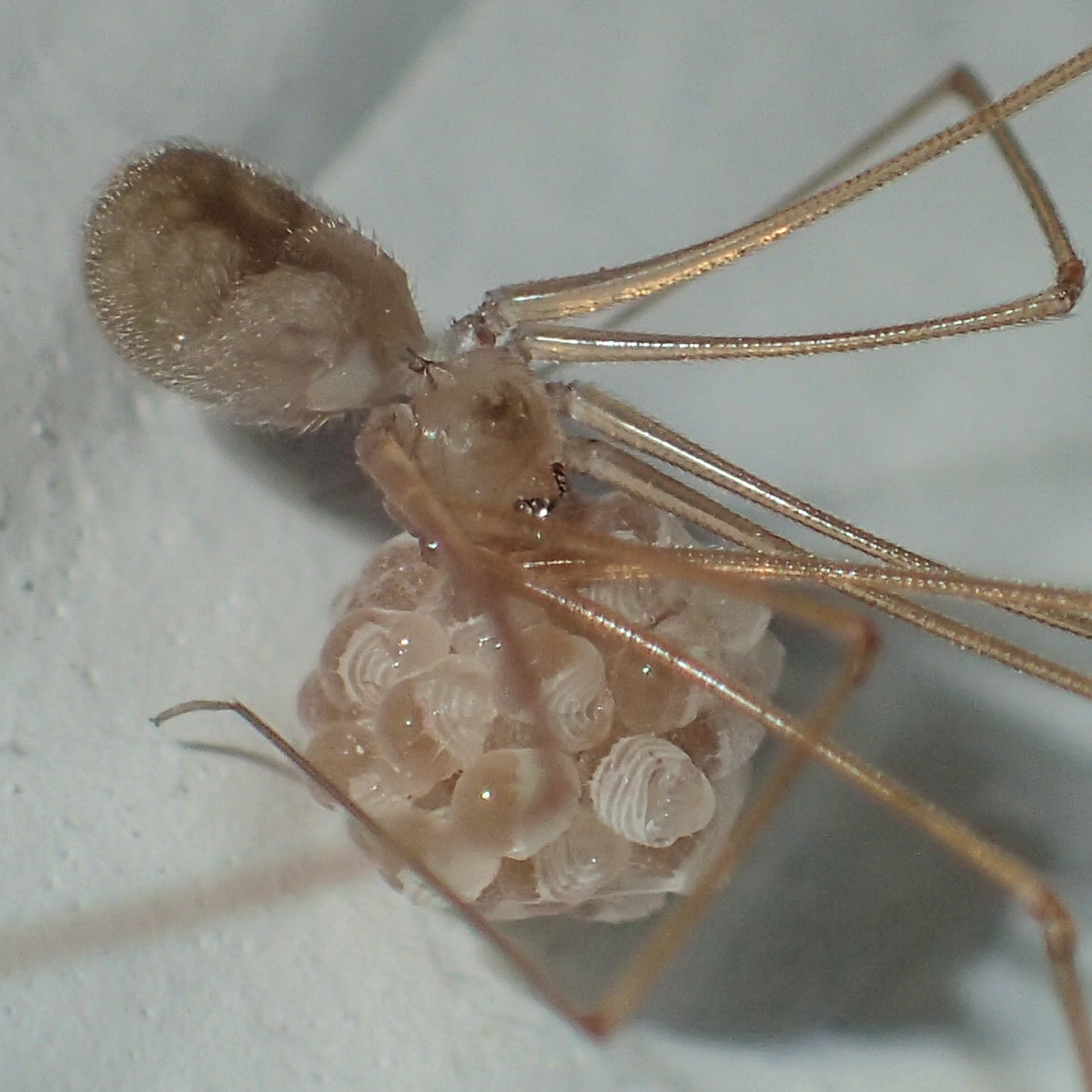
Micropholcus fauroti female carrying egg sac

Micropholcus fauroti is a species of cellar spider. It is native to temperate Asia and has been introduced to other regions of Asia, Europe, the Middle East, Africa, both Americas, Australia and Pacific islands.

== Description ==
Micropholcus fauroti has a shallow, inconspicuous groove on the cephalothorax. The legs are long. Males have a body length of 2.4 mm and the first femur is roughly twice this length. Females have a body length of 2.7 mm and the first femur is roughly 1.5x this length.

In the palpal bulb of adult males, the procursus has a characteristic dorsal projection. This structure is not known from any other known pholcid.

In adult females, the epigyne is unsclerotised with an internal crescent-shaped structure visible through the cuticle anteriorly.

== Ecology ==
Old World Micropholcus (of which M. fauroti is a member) naturally occur in rocky microhabitats such as caves, small caverns of rock walls and underneath large boulders. Micropholcus fauroti is a synanthrope that also occurs in human dwellings, usually in upper corners and edges of rooms.

== See also ==
- List of Pholcidae species
