= Dolichognatha quadrituberculata =

Scientific classification
- Domain: Eukaryota
- Kingdom: Animalia
- Phylum: Arthropoda
- Subphylum: Chelicerata
- Class: Arachnida
- Order: Araneae
- Infraorder: Araneomorphae
- Family: Tetragnathidae
- Genus: Dolichognatha
- Species: D. quadrituberculata

Binomial name
- Dolichognatha quadrituberculata (Keyserling, 1883)

Species of spider

Dolichognatha quadrituberculata is a species of long-jawed orb weaver in the spider family Tetragnathidae. It is found in Peru.
