= Molione triacantha =

Scientific classification
- Kingdom: Animalia
- Phylum: Arthropoda
- Subphylum: Chelicerata
- Class: Arachnida
- Order: Araneae
- Infraorder: Araneomorphae
- Family: Theridiidae
- Genus: Molione
- Species: M. triacantha

Binomial name
- Molione triacantha Thorell, 1892

Species of spider

Molione triacantha is a species of comb-footed spider in the family Theridiidae. It is found in India, China, Laos, Malaysia, Singapore, Taiwan.
