= Dolichognatha junlitjri =

Scientific classification
- Domain: Eukaryota
- Kingdom: Animalia
- Phylum: Arthropoda
- Subphylum: Chelicerata
- Class: Arachnida
- Order: Araneae
- Infraorder: Araneomorphae
- Family: Tetragnathidae
- Genus: Dolichognatha
- Species: D. junlitjri

Binomial name
- Dolichognatha junlitjri (Barrion-Dupo & Barrion, 2014)

Synonyms
- Prolochus junlitjri Barrion-Dupo & Barrion, 2014

Species of spider

Dolichognatha junlitjri is a species of orb-weaver spiders found in the Philippines. The species was discovered in Molawin Creek at Mount Makiling, and was described, illustrated and named by Aimee Lynn Barrion-Dupo and Alberto T. Barrion who published their discovery in 2014. They considered that the genus Prolochus, treated a synonym of Dolichognatha by sources such as the World Spider Catalog as of January 2021, should be revived. It would include Dolichognatha longiceps as Prolochus longiceps, and Prolochus junlitjri. However, a molecular phylogenetic study in 2018 did not support this, and placed the species in Dolichognatha, the placement accepted by the World Spider Catalog.
