= Dolichognatha nietneri =

Scientific classification
- Kingdom: Animalia
- Phylum: Arthropoda
- Subphylum: Chelicerata
- Class: Arachnida
- Order: Araneae
- Infraorder: Araneomorphae
- Family: Tetragnathidae
- Genus: Dolichognatha
- Species: D. nietneri

Binomial name
- Dolichognatha nietneri O. Pickard-Cambridge, 1869

Species of spider

Dolichognatha nietneri, is a species of spider of the genus Dolichognatha. It is endemic to Sri Lanka. The name is after the collector John Nietner.
