= Dolichognatha quinquemucronata =

Scientific classification
- Kingdom: Animalia
- Phylum: Arthropoda
- Subphylum: Chelicerata
- Class: Arachnida
- Order: Araneae
- Infraorder: Araneomorphae
- Family: Tetragnathidae
- Genus: Dolichognatha
- Species: D. quinquemucronata

Binomial name
- Dolichognatha quinquemucronata (Simon, 1895)

Species of spider

Dolichognatha quinquemucronata is a species of long-jawed orb weaver in the spider family Tetragnathidae. It is found in Sri Lanka.
