= Molione uniacantha =

Scientific classification
- Domain: Eukaryota
- Kingdom: Animalia
- Phylum: Arthropoda
- Subphylum: Chelicerata
- Class: Arachnida
- Order: Araneae
- Infraorder: Araneomorphae
- Family: Theridiidae
- Genus: Molione
- Species: M. uniacantha

Binomial name
- Molione uniacantha Wunderlich, 1995

Species of spider

Molione uniacantha is a species of comb-footed spider in the family Theridiidae. It is found in Malaysia and Sumatra.
