= Molione =

Scientific classification
- Kingdom: Animalia
- Phylum: Arthropoda
- Subphylum: Chelicerata
- Class: Arachnida
- Order: Araneae
- Infraorder: Araneomorphae
- Family: Theridiidae
- Genus: Molione; Thorell, 1893

Type species
- M. triacantha Thorell, 1893

Species
- 6, see text

Genus of spiders

Molione is a genus of Asian comb-footed spiders that was first described by Tamerlan Thorell in 1893.

== Species ==
As of May 2020 it contains six species, all found in Asia:

- Molione christae Yoshida, 2003 – Borneo
- Molione kinabalu Yoshida, 2003 – China, Borneo
- Molione lemboda Gao & Li, 2010 – China
- Molione triacantha Thorell, 1893 (type) – India, China, Laos, Malaysia, Singapore, Taiwan
- Molione trispinosa (O. Pickard-Cambridge, 1873) – Sri Lanka
- Molione uniacantha Wunderlich, 1995 – Malaysia, Indonesia (Sumatra)
