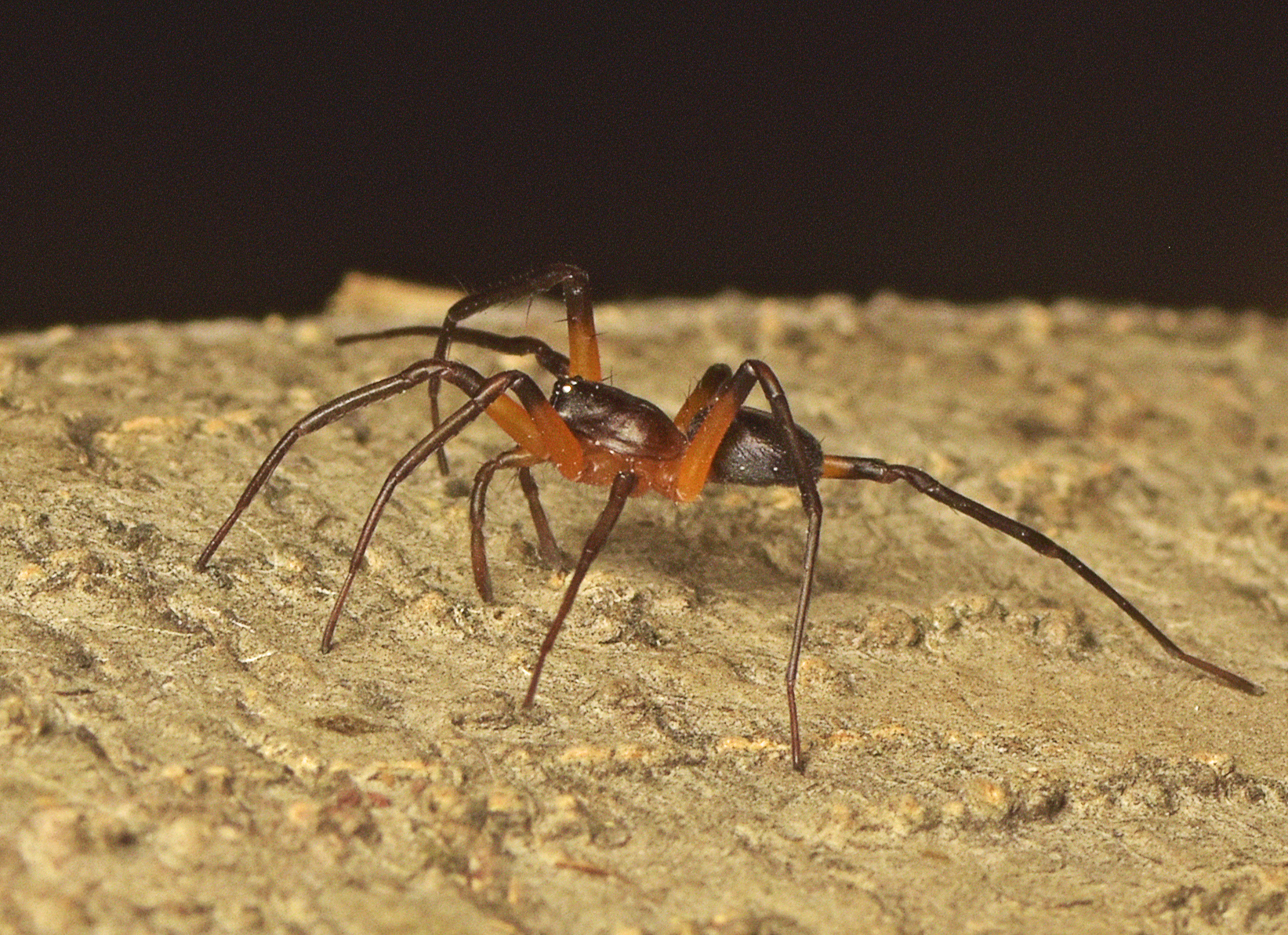

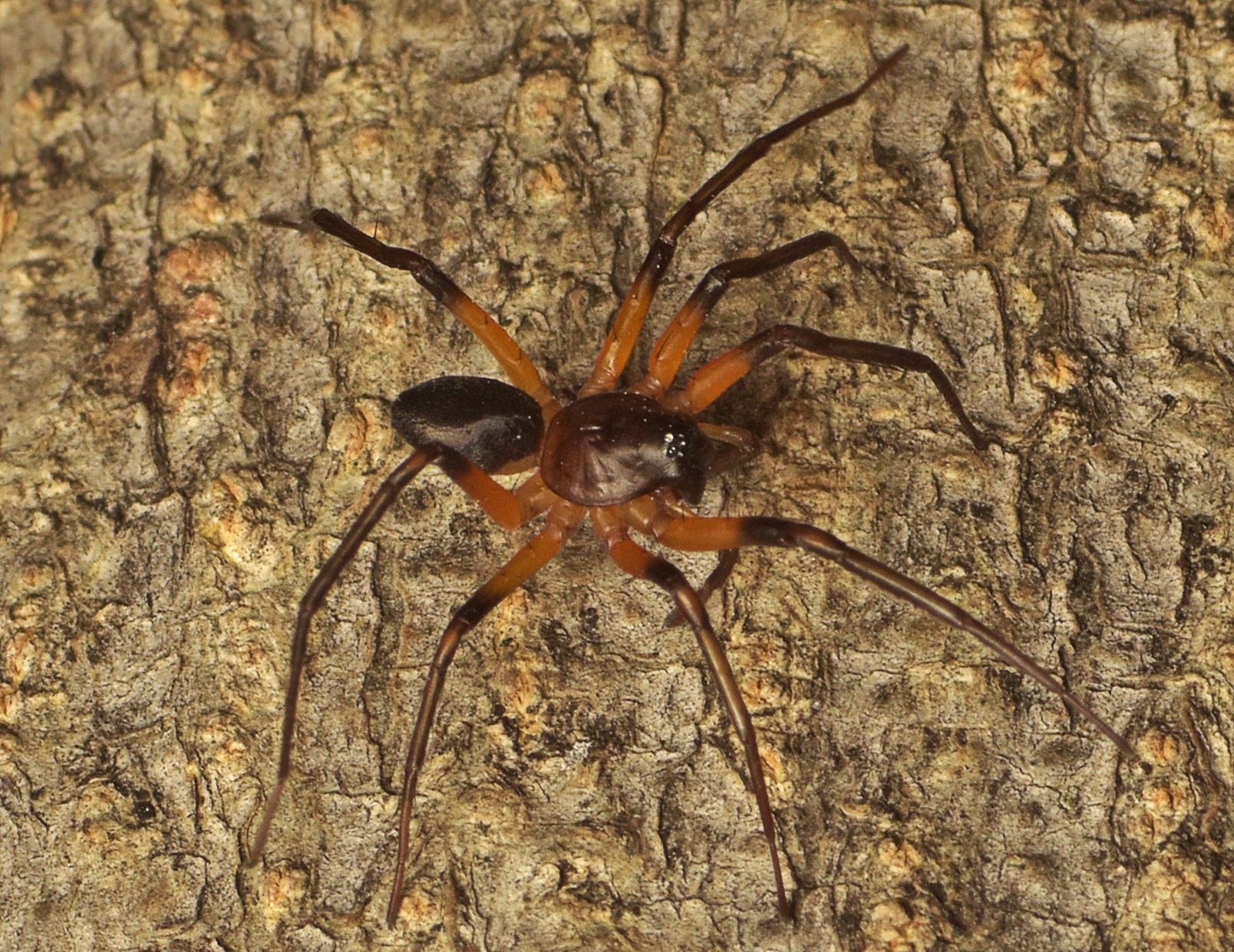

Scientific classification
- Kingdom: Animalia
- Phylum: Arthropoda
- Subphylum: Chelicerata
- Class: Arachnida
- Order: Araneae
- Infraorder: Araneomorphae
- Family: Corinnidae
- Genus: Medmassa
- Species: M. semiaurantiaca

Binomial name
- Medmassa semiaurantiaca Simon, 1909

Synonyms
- Medmassa hiekae Berland, 1922

= Medmassa semiaurantiaca =

Medmassa dark sac spider

Species of spider

Medmassa semiaurantiaca is a spider species in the family Corinnidae. It is commonly known as the Medmassa dark sac spider.

== Distribution ==
Medmassa semiaurantiaca is widely distributed across Africa, occurring in Botswana, Central African Republic, Democratic Republic of the Congo, Ethiopia, Ghana, Guinea-Bissau, Kenya and South Africa.

In South Africa, the species is known only from KwaZulu-Natal Province, specifically from the iSimangaliso Wetland Park at Gwala-Gwala Forest and Hell's Gate.

== Habitat and ecology ==
This species is a rapidly-running, nocturnally-active hunting spider commonly found on the bark of smooth-barked trees.

It has been regularly collected during canopy fogging surveys in forests and savanna habitats throughout tropical Africa. In South Africa, it has been sampled from the Indian Ocean Coastal Belt and Forest biomes at altitudes ranging from 1 to 97 m above sea level.

== Conservation ==
Medmassa semiaurantiaca is listed as Least Concern by the South African National Biodiversity Institute due to its wide geographical range across Africa. There are no significant threats identified for the species.

== Taxonomy ==
The species was originally described by Eugène Simon in 1910 from Guinea-Bissau. It was redescribed by Haddad & Bosselaers (2010), who synonymized Medmassa hiekae Berland, 1922 with this species. The species is known from both sexes.
