= Dolichognatha spinosa =

Scientific classification
- Domain: Eukaryota
- Kingdom: Animalia
- Phylum: Arthropoda
- Subphylum: Chelicerata
- Class: Arachnida
- Order: Araneae
- Infraorder: Araneomorphae
- Family: Tetragnathidae
- Genus: Dolichognatha
- Species: D. spinosa

Binomial name
- Dolichognatha spinosa (Petrunkevitch, 1939)

Species of spider

Dolichognatha spinosa, the longjawed orb weavers, is a species of long-jawed orb weaver in the spider family Tetragnathidae. It is found in Panama.
