= Dolichognatha pentagona =

Scientific classification
- Domain: Eukaryota
- Kingdom: Animalia
- Phylum: Arthropoda
- Subphylum: Chelicerata
- Class: Arachnida
- Order: Araneae
- Infraorder: Araneomorphae
- Family: Tetragnathidae
- Genus: Dolichognatha
- Species: D. pentagona

Binomial name
- Dolichognatha pentagona (Hentz, 1850)

Species of spider

Dolichognatha pentagona is a species of long-jawed orb weaver in the spider family Tetragnathidae. It is found in the United States to Venezuela.
