= Molione trispinosa =

Scientific classification
- Kingdom: Animalia
- Phylum: Arthropoda
- Subphylum: Chelicerata
- Class: Arachnida
- Order: Araneae
- Infraorder: Araneomorphae
- Family: Theridiidae
- Genus: Molione
- Species: M. trispinosa

Binomial name
- Molione trispinosa (O. Pickard-Cambridge, 1873)

Synonyms
- Phoroncidia trispinosa O. Pickard-Cambridge, 1873

Species of spider

Molione trispinosa, is a species of spider of the genus Molione. It is endemic to Sri Lanka.
