= Dolichognatha raveni =

Scientific classification
- Domain: Eukaryota
- Kingdom: Animalia
- Phylum: Arthropoda
- Subphylum: Chelicerata
- Class: Arachnida
- Order: Araneae
- Infraorder: Araneomorphae
- Family: Tetragnathidae
- Genus: Dolichognatha
- Species: D. raveni

Binomial name
- Dolichognatha raveni Smith, 2008

Species of spider

Dolichognatha raveni is a species of long-jawed orb weaver in the spider family Tetragnathidae. It is found in New Guinea and Australia (Queensland).
