= Poecilorchestes decoratus =

Scientific classification
- Kingdom: Animalia
- Phylum: Arthropoda
- Subphylum: Chelicerata
- Class: Arachnida
- Order: Araneae
- Infraorder: Araneomorphae
- Family: Salticidae
- Genus: Poecilorchestes
- Species: P. decoratus

Binomial name
- Poecilorchestes decoratus Simon, 1901

Species of spider

Poecilorchestes decoratus is a jumping spider species in the genus Poecilorchestes that lives in the New Guinea. The male of the species was first identified by Eugène Simon in 1901.
