= Dolichognatha deelemanae =

Scientific classification
- Domain: Eukaryota
- Kingdom: Animalia
- Phylum: Arthropoda
- Subphylum: Chelicerata
- Class: Arachnida
- Order: Araneae
- Infraorder: Araneomorphae
- Family: Tetragnathidae
- Genus: Dolichognatha
- Species: D. deelemanae

Binomial name
- Dolichognatha deelemanae Smith, 2008

Species of spider

Dolichognatha deelemanae is a species of spider in the family Tetragnathidae, found in Borneo.
