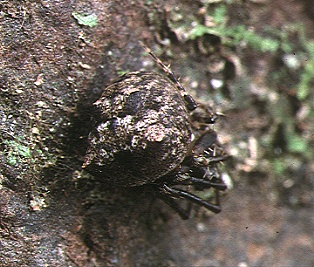

Scientific classification
- Kingdom: Animalia
- Phylum: Arthropoda
- Subphylum: Chelicerata
- Class: Arachnida
- Order: Araneae
- Infraorder: Araneomorphae
- Family: Tetragnathidae
- Genus: Dolichognatha; O. Pickard-Cambridge, 1869

Type species
- D. nietneri O. Pickard-Cambridge, 1869

Species
- 32, see text

Synonyms
- Afiamalu Marples, 1955; Atimiosa Simon, 1895; Homalopoltys Simon, 1895; Landana Simon, 1883; Nicholasia Bryant & Archer, 1940; Paraebius Thorell, 1894; Prolochus Thorell, 1895

= Dolichognatha =

Genus of spiders

Dolichognatha is a genus of tropical and subtropical long-jawed orb-weavers that was first described by Octavius Pickard-Cambridge in 1869. Originally placed with the Archaeidae, it was transferred to the Araneidae in 1967, and to the Tetragnathidae in 1981.

== Species ==
As of March 2021 it contains thirty-two widely distributed species:

- Dolichognatha aethiopica Tullgren, 1910 – East Africa
- Dolichognatha albida (Simon, 1895) – Sri Lanka, Thailand
- Dolichognatha baforti (Legendre, 1967) – Congo
- Dolichognatha bannaensis Wang, Zhang & Peng, 2020 — China
- Dolichognatha comorensis (Schmidt & Krause, 1993) – Comoros
- Dolichognatha cygnea (Simon, 1893) – Venezuela
- Dolichognatha deelemanae Smith, 2008 – Borneo
- Dolichognatha ducke Lise, 1993 – Brazil
- Dolichognatha erwini Brescovit & Cunha, 2001 – Brazil
- Dolichognatha incanescens (Simon, 1895) – Sri Lanka, Indonesia (Borneo), New Guinea, Australia (Queensland)
- Dolichognatha junlitjri (Barrion-Dupo & Barrion, 2014) – Philippines
- Dolichognatha kampa Brescovit & Cunha, 2001 – Brazil
- Dolichognatha kratochvili (Lessert, 1938) – Congo
- Dolichognatha lodiculafaciens (Hingston, 1932) – Guyana
- Dolichognatha lonarensis Bodkhe & Manthen, 2015 – India
- Dolichognatha longiceps (Thorell, 1895) – India, Myanmar, Thailand
- Dolichognatha mandibularis (Thorell, 1894) – Indonesia (Sumatra)
- Dolichognatha mapia Brescovit & Cunha, 2001 – Brazil
- Dolichognatha maturaca Lise, 1993 – Brazil
- Dolichognatha minuscula (Mello-Leitão, 1940) – Guyana
- Dolichognatha nietneri O. Pickard-Cambridge, 1869 (type) – Sri Lanka
- Dolichognatha pentagona (Hentz, 1850) – USA to Venezuela
- Dolichognatha petiti (Simon, 1884) – Congo, Equatorial Guinea (Bioko)
- Dolichognatha pinheiral Brescovit & Cunha, 2001 – Brazil
- Dolichognatha proserpina (Mello-Leitão, 1943) – Brazil
- Dolichognatha quadrituberculata (Keyserling, 1883) – Peru
- Dolichognatha quinquemucronata (Simon, 1895) – Sri Lanka
- Dolichognatha raveni Smith, 2008 – New Guinea, Australia (Queensland)
- Dolichognatha richardi (Marples, 1955) – Samoa
- Dolichognatha spinosa (Petrunkevitch, 1939) – Panama
- Dolichognatha tigrina Simon, 1893 – Caribbean, northern South America
- Dolichognatha umbrophila Tanikawa, 1991 – Taiwan, Japan (Okinawa Is.)

In synonymy:

- D. tuberculata (Keyserling, 1893) = Dolichognatha pentagona (Hentz, 1850)
