= Dolichognatha longiceps =

Scientific classification
- Kingdom: Animalia
- Phylum: Arthropoda
- Subphylum: Chelicerata
- Class: Arachnida
- Order: Araneae
- Infraorder: Araneomorphae
- Family: Tetragnathidae
- Genus: Dolichognatha
- Species: D. longiceps

Binomial name
- Dolichognatha longiceps (Thorell, 1895)

Synonyms
- Prolochus longiceps Thorell, 1895

Species of spider

Dolichognatha longiceps is a species of spider in the family Tetragnathidae, found in India, Myanmar and Thailand. In 2014, it was suggested that the species be transferred back to the genus Prolochus, where it was placed by Tamerlan Thorell in 1895, but as of May 2016, this has not been accepted by secondary sources, such as the World Spider Catalog.
