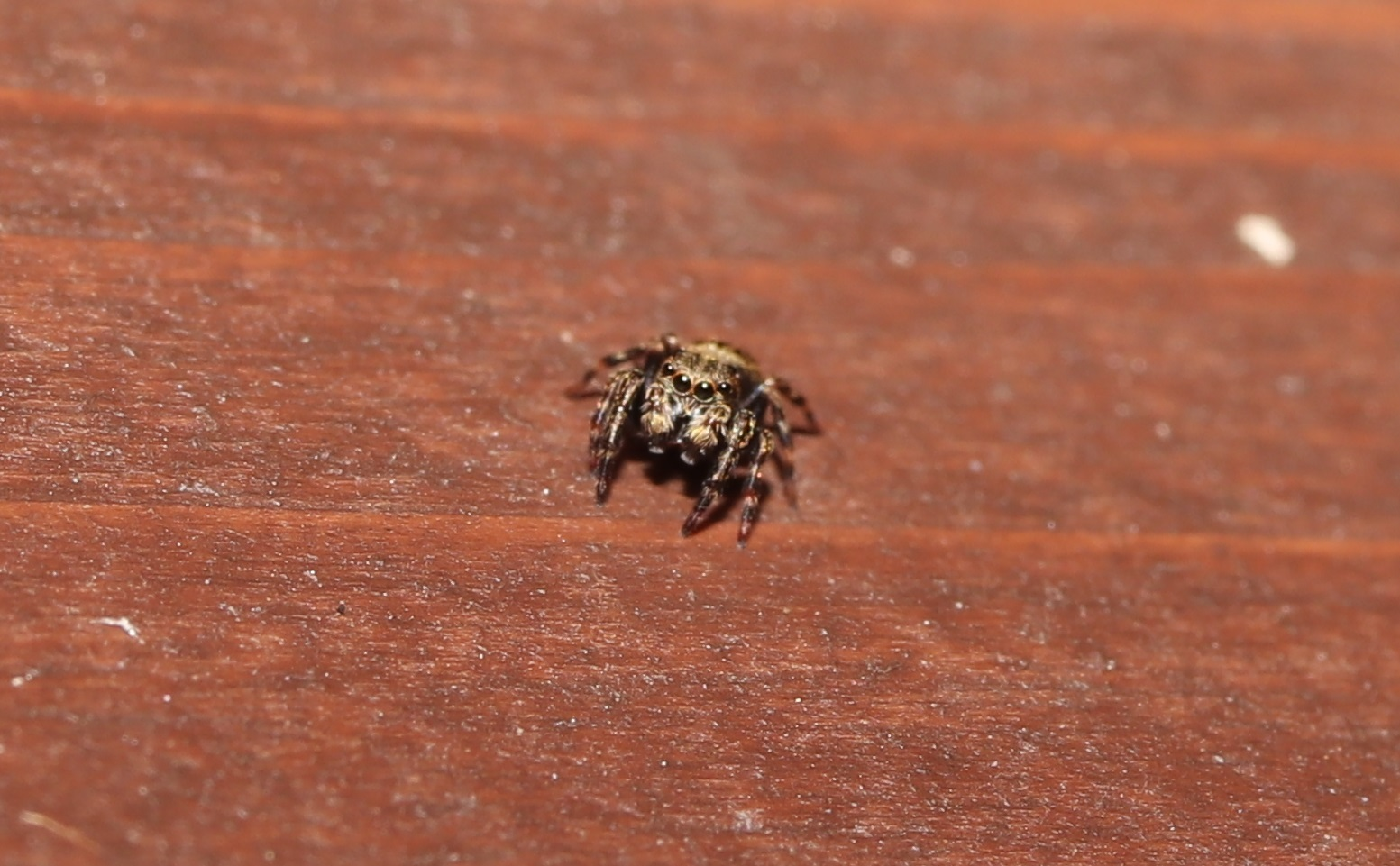
- male L. aenea from Japan

Scientific classification
- Kingdom: Animalia
- Phylum: Arthropoda
- Subphylum: Chelicerata
- Class: Arachnida
- Order: Araneae
- Infraorder: Araneomorphae
- Family: Salticidae
- Subfamily: Salticinae
- Genus: Laufeia; Simon, 1889

Type species
- Laufeia aenea Simon, 1889

Species
- See text.

Diversity
- 6 species

Synonyms
- Orcevia Thorell, 1890; Junxattus Prószyński & Deeleman-Reinhold, 2012; Lechia Zabka, 1985

= Laufeia =

Genus of spiders

Laufeia is a spider genus of the jumping spider family, Salticidae, with a mainly Asian distribution, where they are found on tree trunks and branches or among leaf litter.

== Description ==
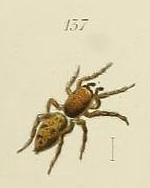
drawing of male from Bösenberg & Strand (1906)

Laufeia species are mostly small, hairy, brownish spiders. The chelicera usually has a tooth with two cusps on the rear-facing edge. The male generally has a slightly hardened plate (scutum) on the upper surface of the abdomen. The genitalia vary considerably between species; for example, the male palpal bulb has either a long or short embolus, which may or may not be coiled.

== Taxonomy ==
The genus Laufeia was erected by Eugène Simon in 1889 for the type species Laufeia aenea, which had been collected in Yokohama, Japan. Simon did not explain the origin of the genus name. In Norse mythology, Laufeia was the mother of the god Loki.

Four more Laufeia species were known to Andrzej Bohdanowicz and Jerzy Prószyński in 1987; they doubted that three of them belonged in the genus. In 2012, Prószyński and Christa Deeleman-Reinhold split off some Laufeia species into the genera Orcevia and Junxattus, noting the diversity of genital structures. A molecular and morphological study in 2015 showed that the original circumscription of Laufeia constituted a strongly supported clade, and Junxia Zhang and Wayne Maddison restored all the species to Laufeia, arguing that strong sexual selection could produce genital diversity even in closely related species.

However, subsequent taxonomic work by Prószyński in 2019 and Yu et al. in 2024 has confirmed the validity of the separate genera Orcevia, Junxattus (now a synonym of Chalcovietnamicus), and Lechia, with many former Laufeia species transferred to these and other genera.

=== Species ===
As of September 2025, the World Spider Catalog accepts the following species:

- Laufeia aenea Simon, 1889 (type species) – China, Korea, Japan
- Laufeia aerihirta (Urquhart, 1888) – New Zealand
- Laufeia banna Wang & Li, 2021 – China
- Laufeia concava Zhang & Maddison, 2012 – Malaysia
- Laufeia sasakii Ikeda, 1998 – Japan
- Laufeia zhangae Wang & Li, 2022 – China, Vietnam
