= Christa L. Deeleman-Reinhold =

Dutch arachnologist (1930–2025)

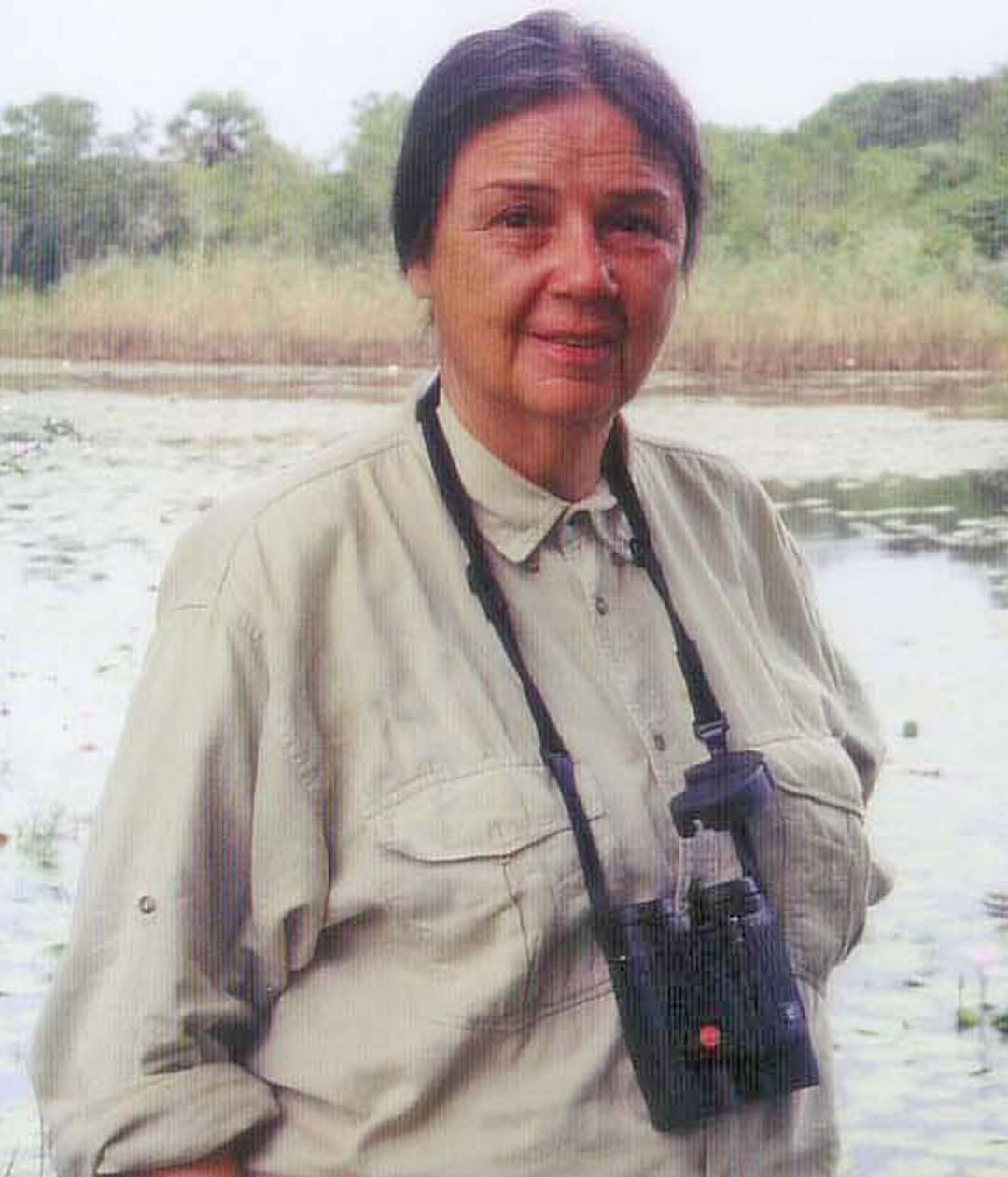
- Born: 23 November 1930; Java, Dutch East Indies
- Died: 26 March 2025 (aged 94)
- Education: Leiden University
- Spouse: Paul Robert Deeleman
- Scientific career
- Fields: Arachnology
- Author abbrev. (zoology): Deeleman-Reinhold

Christa Laetitia Deeleman-Reinhold (23 November 1930 – 26 March 2025) was a Dutch arachnologist. She specialized in spiders from Southeast Asia and Southern Europe, particularly cave-dwelling and tropical spiders. She donated a collection of about 25,000 Southeast Asian spiders, the largest collection of Southeast Asian spiders in existence, to the Naturalis Biodiversity Center in Leiden. In addition to numerous articles, she wrote the book Forest Spiders of South East Asia (2001).

Deeleman-Reinhold was born on 23 November 1930 to Dutch parents on the island of Java, Dutch East Indies. Her family returned to the Netherlands in 1935, and she entered Leiden University in 1949. After three years she began working at the Dutch National Museum of Natural History, studying mantises under museum director Hilbrand Boschma. She began studying spiders as a postgraduate, first studying Dutch ground spiders, and later cave spiders of the genus Troglohyphantes under the supervision of J. T. "Koos" Wiebes, and earned a PhD from Leiden University in 1978. She was married to businessman Paul Robert Deeleman, who accompanied her on multiple collecting expeditions to Yugoslavia and Southeast Asia. Her husband died in 1989, and she spent the next decade working on her magnum opus, Forest Spiders of South East Asia (2001), a nearly 600-page work in which she revised six spider families, describing 18 new genera and 115 new species. She continued to actively publish until the age of 93. Reinhold died on 26 March 2025, at the age of 94.

== Taxa named for Deeleman-Reinhold ==
- Deelemania Jocqué & Bosmans, 1983
- Deelemanella Yoshida, 2003
- Deelemanikara Jäger, 2021
- Troglohyphantes deelemanae Tanasevitch, 1987
- Harpactea deelemanae Dunin, 1989
- Kenocymbium deelemanae Millidge & Russell-Smith, 1992
- Hersilia deelemanae Baehr & Baehr, 1993
- Dianleucauge deelemanae Song & Zhu, 1994
- Amaurobius deelemanae Thaler & Knoflach, 1995
- Dubiaranea deelemanae Millidge, 1995
- Cryphoecina deelemanae Deltshev, 1997
- Deelemanella Yoshida, 2003
- Molione christae Yoshida, 2003
- Rhitymna deelemanae Jäger, 2003
- Herennia deelemanae Kuntner, 2005
- Spermophora deelemanae Huber, 2005
- Dolichognatha deelemanae Smith, 2008

== Selected publications ==
- Deeleman-Reinhold, 1971: "Beitrag zur Kenntnis höhlenbewohnender Dysderidae (Araneida) aus Jugoslawien." Razprave slovenska akademija znanosti in umetnosti, vol. 14 pp. 95–120.
- Deeleman-Reinhold, 1974: "The cave spider fauna of Montenegro (Araneae)." Glasnik Republičkog Zavoda za zaštitu prirode i Prirodnjačkog Muzeja, vol. 6 pp. 9–33
- Deeleman-Reinhold, 1978: "Revision of the cave-dwelling and related spiders of the genus Troglohyphantes Joseph (Linyphiidae), with special reference to the Yugoslav species." Academia Scientiarum et Artium Slovenica, Classis IV: Historia Naturalis, Institutum Biologicum Ionnis Hadži, Ljubljana, vol. 23 pp. 1–220. full text
- Deeleman-Reinhold, 1980: "Contribution to the knowledge of the southeast Asian spiders of the families Pacullidae and Tetrablemmidae." Zoologische Mededelingen Leiden, vol. 56 pp. 65–82 (full text)
- Deeleman-Reinhold, 1981: "Remarks on Origin and Distribution of Troglobitic Spiders". Proc. 8th Int. Congr. Speleology, blz. 305–308. (full text)
- Deeleman-Reinhold & Prinsen, 1987: "Micropholcus fauroti (Simon) n. comb., a pantropical, synanthropic spider (Araneae: Pholcidae)." Entomologische Berichten, Amsterdam, vol. 47, pp. 73–77
- Deeleman-Reinhold & Deeleman, 1988: "Révision des Dysderinae (Araneae, Dysderidae), les espèces mediterranéennes occidentales exceptées." Tijdschrift voor Entomologie, vol. 131 pp. 141–269
- Deeleman-Reinhold, 1993: "A remarkable troglobitic tetrablemmid spider from a cave in Thailand (Arachnida: Araneae: Tetrablemmidae)." Natural History Bulletin of the Siam Society, vol. 41 n. 2 pp. 99–103
- Deeleman-Reinhold, 1995: "The Ochyroceratidae of the Indo-Pacific region (Araneae)." The Raffles Bulletin of Zoology Supplement, n. 2, pp. 1–103
- Deeleman-Reinhold, 2001: Forest spiders of South East Asia: With a revision of the sac and ground spiders (Araneae: Clubionidae, Corinnidae, Liocranidae, Gnaphosidae, Prodidomidae and Trochanterriidae. Brill Academic Publishers, Leiden, pp. 1–591. ISBN 9004119590
- Floren, A. & Deeleman-Reinhold, C.L. (2005): "Diversity of arboreal spiders in primary and disturbed tropical forests." Journal of Arachnology, vol. 33 nr. 2, pp. 323–333.
- Deeleman-Reinhold, 2009: "Spiny theridiids in the Asian tropics. Systematics, notes on behaviour and species richness (Araneae: Theridiidae: Chrysso, Meotipa)". Contrib. Nat. Hist., vol. 12, blz. 403–436. (full text)
- Deeleman-Reinhold, 2009: "Description of the lynx spiders of a canopy fogging project in northern Borneo (Araneae: Oxyopidae), with description of a new genus and six new species of Hamataliwa." Zoologische Medelingen Leiden, vol. 83, pp. 673–700 (full text)
