= Pribumia =

Scientific classification
- Kingdom: Animalia
- Phylum: Arthropoda
- Subphylum: Chelicerata
- Class: Arachnida
- Order: Araneae
- Infraorder: Araneomorphae
- Family: Pholcidae
- Genus: Pribumia; Huber, 2018

Type species
- Pholcus singalang (Huber, 2011)

Species
- 6, see text

Genus of spiders

Pribumia is a genus of southeast Asian cellar spiders erected in 2018 for several species transferred from Pholcus after a molecular phylogenetic study of the Calapnita-Panjange clade of Pholcidae. Six species previously in the minang group of Pholcus were transferred, but P. tahai is now in Apokayana. They have long, thin abdomens and six eyes, three on each of two eye stalks. The name is derived from the local term for Native Indonesians.

- Calapnita‑Panjange clade
  - Nipisa
  - - - Kintaqa
      - Pribumia
    - - - Paiwana
        - - Muruta
          - - Meraha
            - Calapnita
      - - Tissahamia
        - - Teranga
          - Panjange

== Species ==
As of April 2022 it contains six species:

- P. atrigularis (Simon, 1901) – Malaysia, Singapore, Indonesia
- P. bohorok (Huber, 2011) – Indonesia (Sumatra)
- P. diopsis (Simon, 1901) – Thailand
- P. hurau (Huber, 2011) – Indonesia (Sumatra)
- P. minang (Huber, 2011) – Indonesia (Sumatra)
- P. singalang (Huber, 2011) (type) – Indonesia (Sumatra)

== See also ==
- Pholcus
- Uthina
- Apokayana
- List of Pholcidae species
