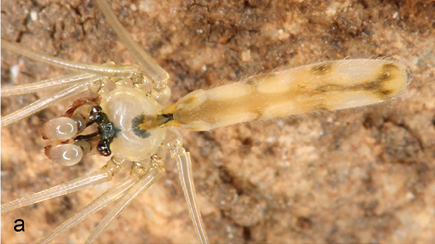
- Kintaqa satun

Scientific classification
- Kingdom: Animalia
- Phylum: Arthropoda
- Subphylum: Chelicerata
- Class: Arachnida
- Order: Araneae
- Infraorder: Araneomorphae
- Family: Pholcidae
- Genus: Kintaqa; Huber, 2018

Type species
- Pholcus buatong (Huber, 2016)

Species
- 5, see text

= Kintaqa =

Genus of spiders

Kintaqa is a genus of southeast Asian cellar spiders erected in 2018 for five species moved from Pholcus after a molecular phylogenetic study. They are medium-sized spiders, distinguished by their unique enlarged shape of fourth segment of pedipalps.

- Calapnita‑Panjange clade
  - Nipisa
  - - - Kintaqa
      - Pribumia
    - - - Paiwana
        - - Muruta
          - - Meraha
            - Calapnita
      - - Tissahamia
        - - Teranga
          - Panjange

The name honors the Kintaq, a Thai ethnic group.

== Species ==
As of April 2022 it contains five species:

- K. buatong (Huber, 2016) (type) – Thailand
- K. fuza (Yao & Li, 2017) – Thailand
- K. mueangensis (Yao & Li, 2017) – Thailand
- K. satun (Huber, 2011) – Thailand, Malaysia
- K. schwendingeri (Huber, 2011) – Thailand

== See also ==
- Pholcus
- List of Pholcidae species
