= Tissahamia =

Scientific classification
- Kingdom: Animalia
- Phylum: Arthropoda
- Subphylum: Chelicerata
- Class: Arachnida
- Order: Araneae
- Infraorder: Araneomorphae
- Family: Pholcidae
- Genus: Tissahamia; Huber, 2018

Type species
- Pholcus ethagala (Huber, 2011)

Species
- 12, see text

Genus of spiders

Tissahamia is a genus of southeast Asian cellar spiders named after Wanniyalaeto chief Uru Warige Tissahami. It was erected in 2018 for several species transferred from Pholcus after a molecular phylogenetic study of the Calapnita-Panjange clade of Pholcidae. They have long, thin abdomens that bend upward near the end. They also have six eyes, three on each of two eye stalks.

- Calapnita‑Panjange clade
  - Nipisa
  - - - Kintaqa
      - Pribumia
    - - - Paiwana
        - - Muruta
          - - Meraha
            - Calapnita
      - - Tissahamia
        - - Teranga
          - Panjange

== Species ==
As of April 2022 it contains twelve species:

- T. barisan (Huber, 2016) – Indonesia (Sumatra)
- T. bukittimah (Huber, 2016) – Singapore
- T. ethagala (Huber, 2011) (type) – Sri Lanka
- T. gombak (Huber, 2011) – Malaysia
- T. karuna Huber, 2019 – Sri Lanka
- T. kottawagamaensis (Yao & Li, 2016) – Sri Lanka
- T. ledang (Huber, 2011) – Malaysia
- T. maturata (Huber, 2011) – Sri Lanka
- T. phui (Huber, 2011) – Thailand
- T. tanahrata (Huber, 2016) – Malaysia
- T. uludong (Huber, 2016) – Malaysia
- T. vescula (Simon, 1901) – Malaysia

== See also ==
- Pholcus
- List of Pholcidae species
