= Teranga =

Scientific classification
- Kingdom: Animalia
- Phylum: Arthropoda
- Subphylum: Chelicerata
- Class: Arachnida
- Order: Araneae
- Infraorder: Araneomorphae
- Family: Pholcidae
- Genus: Teranga; Huber, 2018

Type species
- Pholcus kerinci (Huber, 2011)

Species
- 4, see text

Genus of spiders

Teranga is a genus of southeast Asian cellar spiders erected in 2018 for four species transferred from Pholcus after a molecular phylogenetic study of the Calapnita-Panjange clade of Pholcidae. They are medium-sized cellar spiders, averaging 3.5 to 4.5 millimetres (0.14 to 0.18 in) in length, with longer legs, the first pair reaching 30 to 40 millimetres (1.2 to 1.6 in) long. The abdomen is long and thin, with a slight upward bend near the end. The name is derived from the Malay "terang", meaning "bright", referring to their light color.

- Calapnita‑Panjange clade
  - Nipisa
  - - - Kintaqa
      - Pribumia
    - - - Paiwana
        - - Muruta
          - - Meraha
            - Calapnita
      - - Tissahamia
        - - Teranga
          - Panjange

== Species ==
As of April 2022 it contains four species:

- T. cibodas (Huber, 2011) – Indonesia (Java)
- T. domingo (Huber, 2016) – Philippines
- T. kerinci (Huber, 2011) (type) – Indonesia (Sumatra)
- T. matutum (Huber, 2016) – Philippines

== See also ==
- Pholcus
- List of Pholcidae species
