= Nipisa =

Scientific classification
- Kingdom: Animalia
- Phylum: Arthropoda
- Subphylum: Chelicerata
- Class: Arachnida
- Order: Araneae
- Infraorder: Araneomorphae
- Family: Pholcidae
- Genus: Nipisa; Huber, 2018

Type species
- Calapnita phyllicola (Deeleman-Reinhold, 1986)

Species
- 10, see text

Genus of spiders

Nipisa is a genus of southeast Asian cellar spiders erected in 2018 after a molecular phylogenetic study of Pholcidae. It consists of ten Calapnita species, previously the phyllicola group of Pholcidae, now elevated to genus rank. They are pale whitish in color, with a cylindrical abdomen and relatively long legs. The name is derived from the Malay "nipis", meaning "thin", in reference to the long, thin abdomen.

- Calapnita‑Panjange clade
  - Nipisa
  - - - Kintaqa
      - Pribumia
    - - - Paiwana
        - - Muruta
          - - Meraha
            - Calapnita
      - - Tissahamia
        - - Teranga
          - Panjange

== Species ==
As of April 2022 it contains ten species:

- N. anai (Huber, 2017) – Thailand, Malaysia (mainland), Singapore, Indonesia (Sumatra, Java?)
- N. bankirai (Huber, 2017) – Malaysia, Indonesia (Borneo)
- N. bidayuh (Huber, 2017) – Malaysia (Borneo)
- N. deelemanae (Huber, 2011) – Malaysia (Borneo)
- N. kubah (Huber, 2017) – Malaysia (Borneo)
- N. lehi (Huber, 2017) – Malaysia (Borneo)
- N. phasmoides (Deeleman-Reinhold, 1986) – Indonesia (Java, Sumatra, Borneo)
- N. phyllicola (Deeleman-Reinhold, 1986) (type) – Thailand, Malaysia (mainland, Borneo), Indonesia (Sumatra, Borneo), Singapore
- N. semengoh (Huber, 2011) – Malaysia (Borneo)
- N. subphyllicola (Deeleman-Reinhold, 1986) – Philippines

== See also ==
- Calapnita
- List of Pholcidae species
