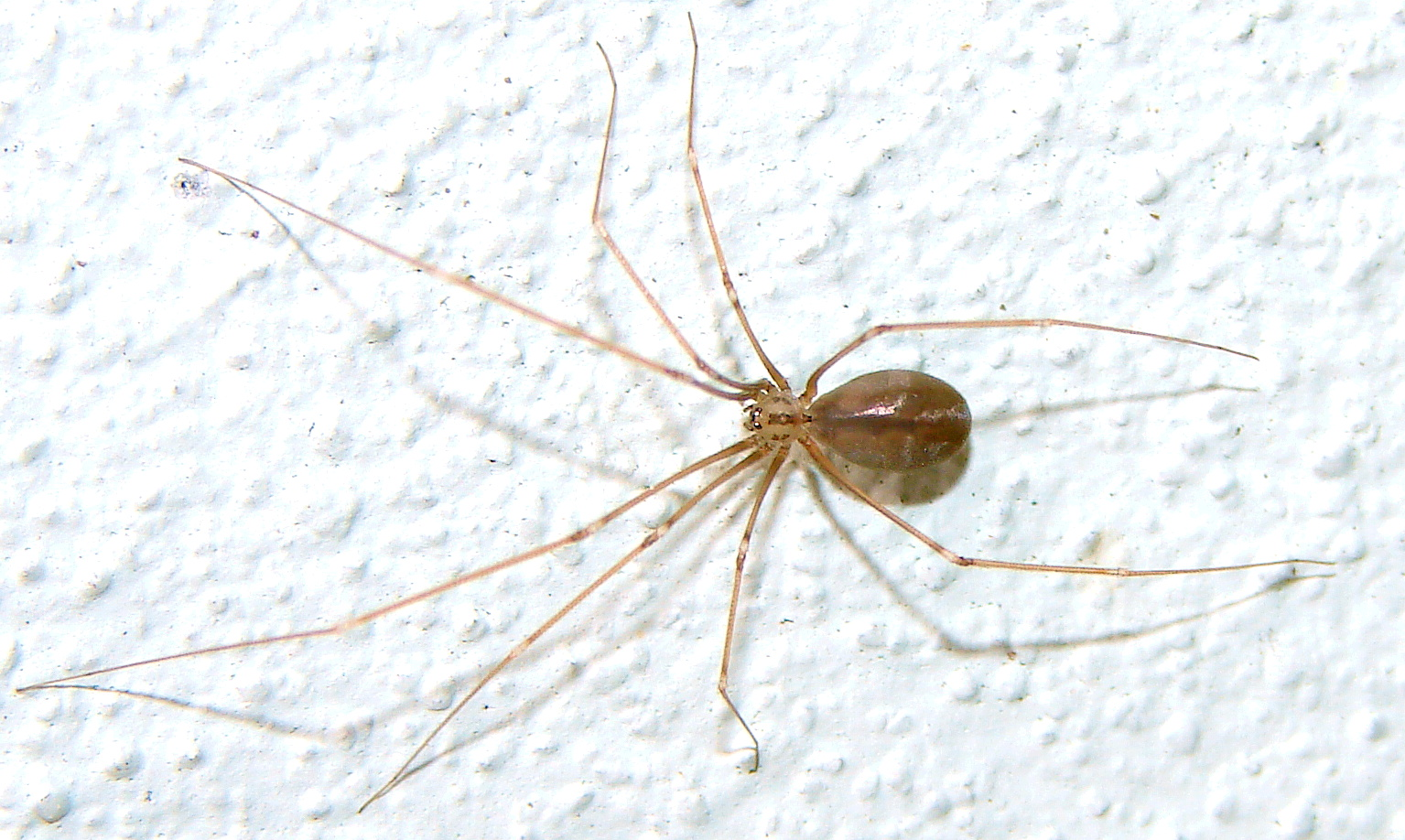

Scientific classification
- Kingdom: Animalia
- Phylum: Arthropoda
- Subphylum: Chelicerata
- Class: Arachnida
- Order: Araneae
- Infraorder: Araneomorphae
- Family: Pholcidae
- Genus: Pholcus
- Species: P. opilionoides

Binomial name
- Pholcus opilionoides (Schrank, 1781)

Synonyms
- Aranea opilionoides Schrank, 1781; Pholcus osellai Brignoli, 1971; Pholcus donensis Ponomarev, 2005

= Pholcus opilionoides =

Species of spider

Pholcus opilionoides is a species of spider in the family Pholcidae (cellar spiders) found in Europe, Egypt, the Caucasus and possibly Iran. It can be easily confused with Pholcus phalangioides.

== Description ==
The cephalothorax is spherical, light brown with an irregular darker stripe in the middle. The body length (excluding legs) for an adult is 3-5 mm. The long legs of this spider resemble a Opiliones, but upon closer look, it's divided into a cephalothorax and an abdomen.

== Similar species ==
Pholcus manueli is the most similar having similar dimensions and sternum pattern.

== See also ==
- List of Pholcidae species
