= Uthina =

Archaeological site in Tunisia

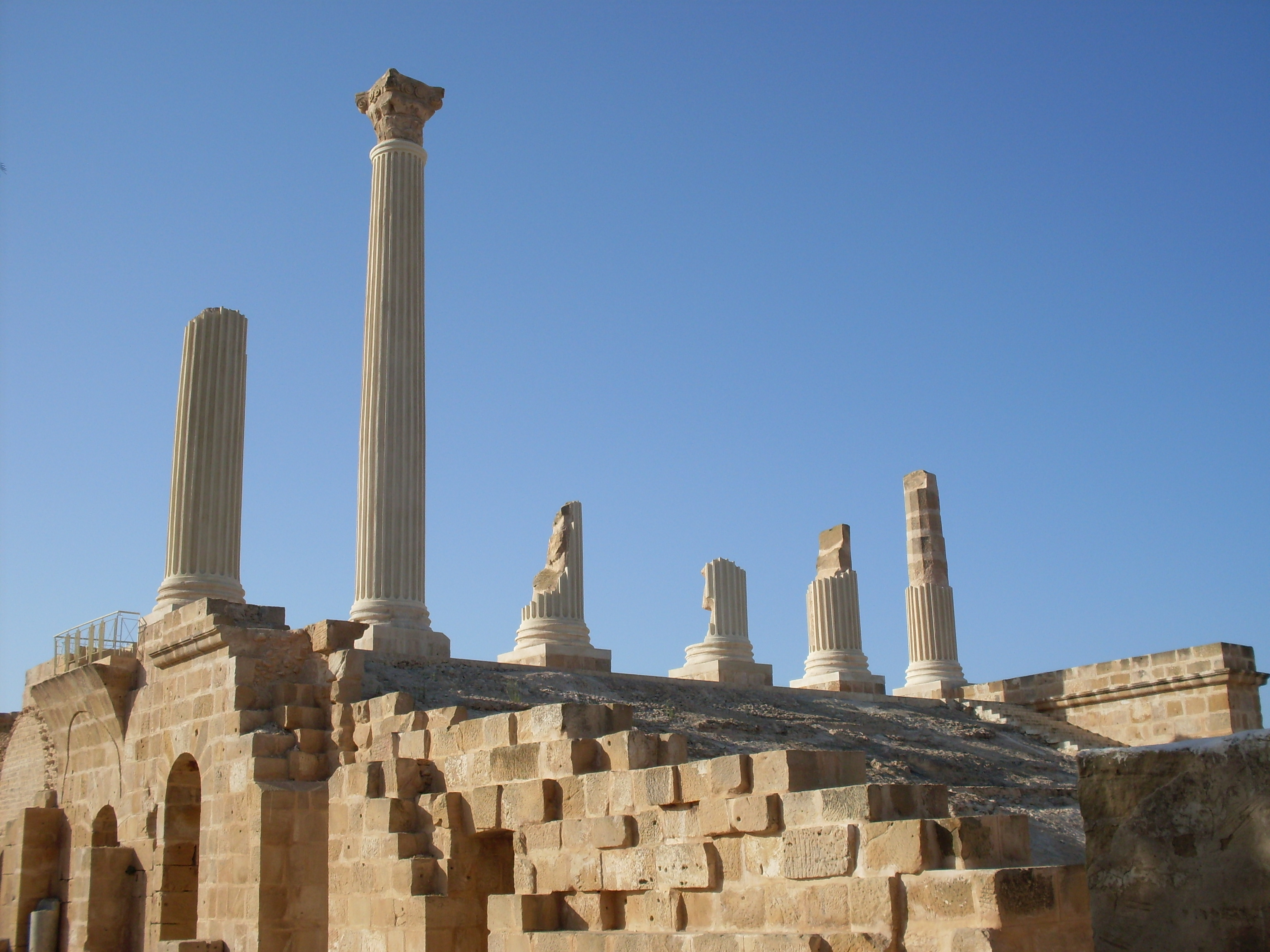
- The Capitolium of Uthina

- Location within Tunisia
- 36°36′25″N 10°10′25″E
- Type: Archaeological site
- Periods: Antiquity, Late antiquity
- Cultures: Berber, Roman, Vandal, Byzantine, Islamic
- Satellite of: Roman Empire, Byzantine Empire
- Associated with: Veterans of Legio XIII Gemina, African-Romans, Vandals, Byzantines
- Location: Oudhna, near Mornag, Tunisia
- Region: Ben Arous Governorate

History
- Built: c. 27 B.C. (Roman foundation); originally a Berber settlement
- Built by: Augustus (as a Roman colony)
- Abandoned: c. 7th–8th century A.D. (decline after Arab expansion)

Site notes
- Material: Limestone, marble, mortar
- Area: ~100 hectares
- Excavation dates: Early surveys in 1873 by Sainte-Marie; Paul Gauckler (1892–1905); systematic excavations from 1993
- Archaeologists: Paul Gauckler, Louis Poinssot
- Condition: Ruined (partially restored)
- Owner: State property
- Management: Agency for the Development of National Heritage and Cultural Promotion (AMVPPC) & National Heritage Institute (INP)
- Public access: Yes
- Features one of the largest grand Capitoliums in North Africa (comprising three distinct temples), a highly restored elliptical amphitheater built into a hillside that seated 16,000, and magnificent mosaics (such as those from the House of the Laberii) housed in the Bardo National Museum.

Uthina is also a spider genus (Pholcidae)

Uthina or Oudna (Arabic: أوذنة) was an ancient Roman-Carthaginian city located near Tunis, Tunisia.

== History ==
Uthina was a town in the province of Africa Proconsularis, now northern Tunisia.

Uthina became a Roman colony of veterans of Legio XIII Gemina during the reign of Emperor Augustus. Hence, it was mentioned by Ptolemy (IV, 3, 34), Pliny the Elder, and the Tabula Peutingeriana.

From the accounts given by geographers the site seems to be the ruins that form the archeological site of Oudna, near a station on the railway from Tunis to Kef and not far from what was the World War II Oudna Airfield. These ruins occupy a surface nearly three miles in circumference, covering a hilly plateau, and commanding the left bank of the Milian wady; there are remains of a fortress, cisterns, an aqueduct, a triumphal arch, a theatre, an amphitheater, a basilica with a circular crypt, and a bridge. Many mosaics are to be found there as well.

== Uthina amphitheater ==
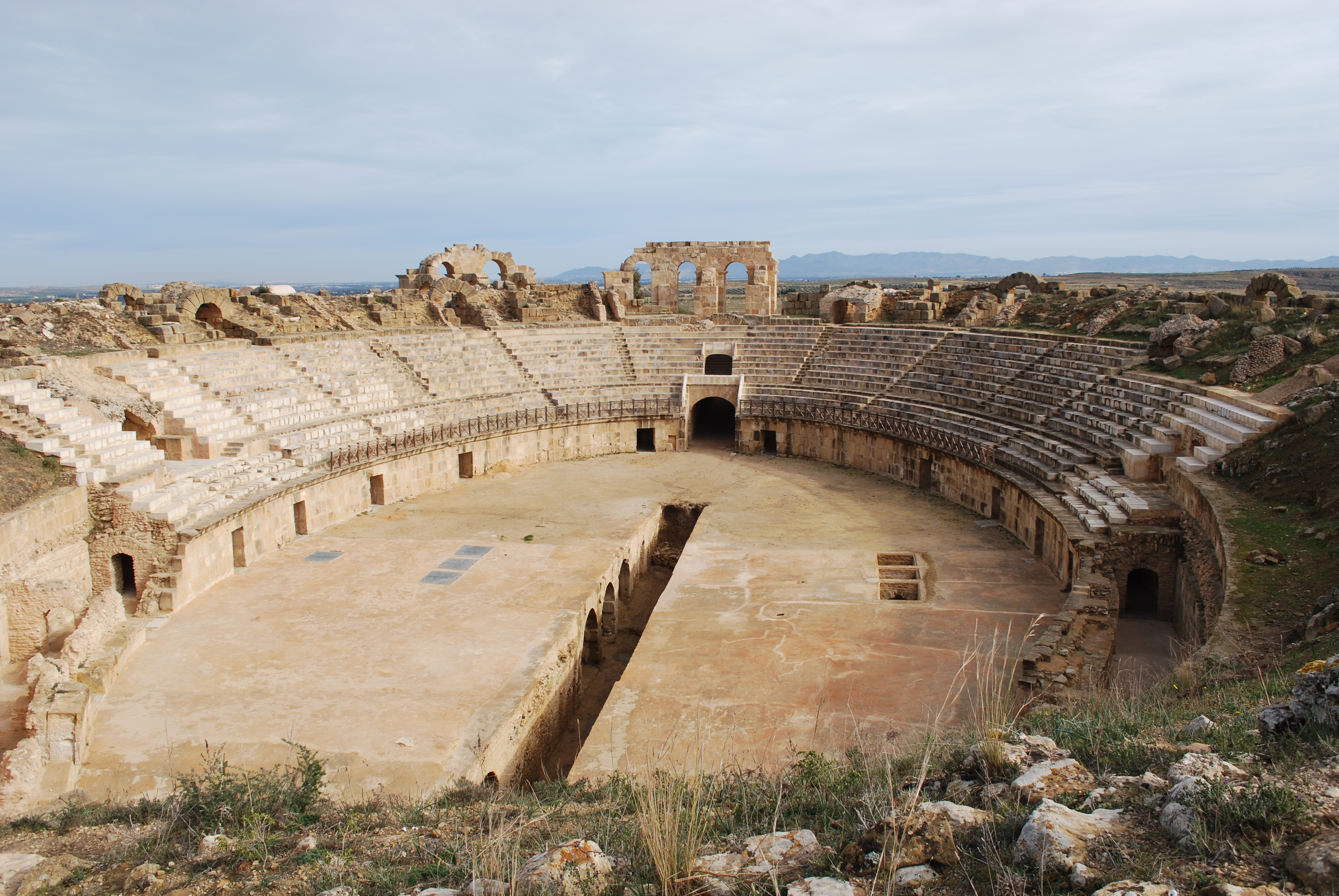
Uthina amphitheater.

The Uthina amphitheater is located in the north of the former city. It is half dug into the hill and the seats were addorsed to the slope; only the upper part of the building with the arcs is above ground.

The edifice, which dates from the reign of Hadrian, measures 113mx90m and seated about 16,000. The amphitheater has undergone digging and renovations since the start of excavations in 1993. The central arena measures 58mx35m. An underground vaulted gallery aligned in a major axis provides access to the amphitheater basement with symmetrical vaults and rooms under the central arena.

== Filming location ==
The site (credited as "Oudhna") served as the filming location for the 2001 film Murder in Mesopotamia based on Agatha Christie's novel of the same name.
