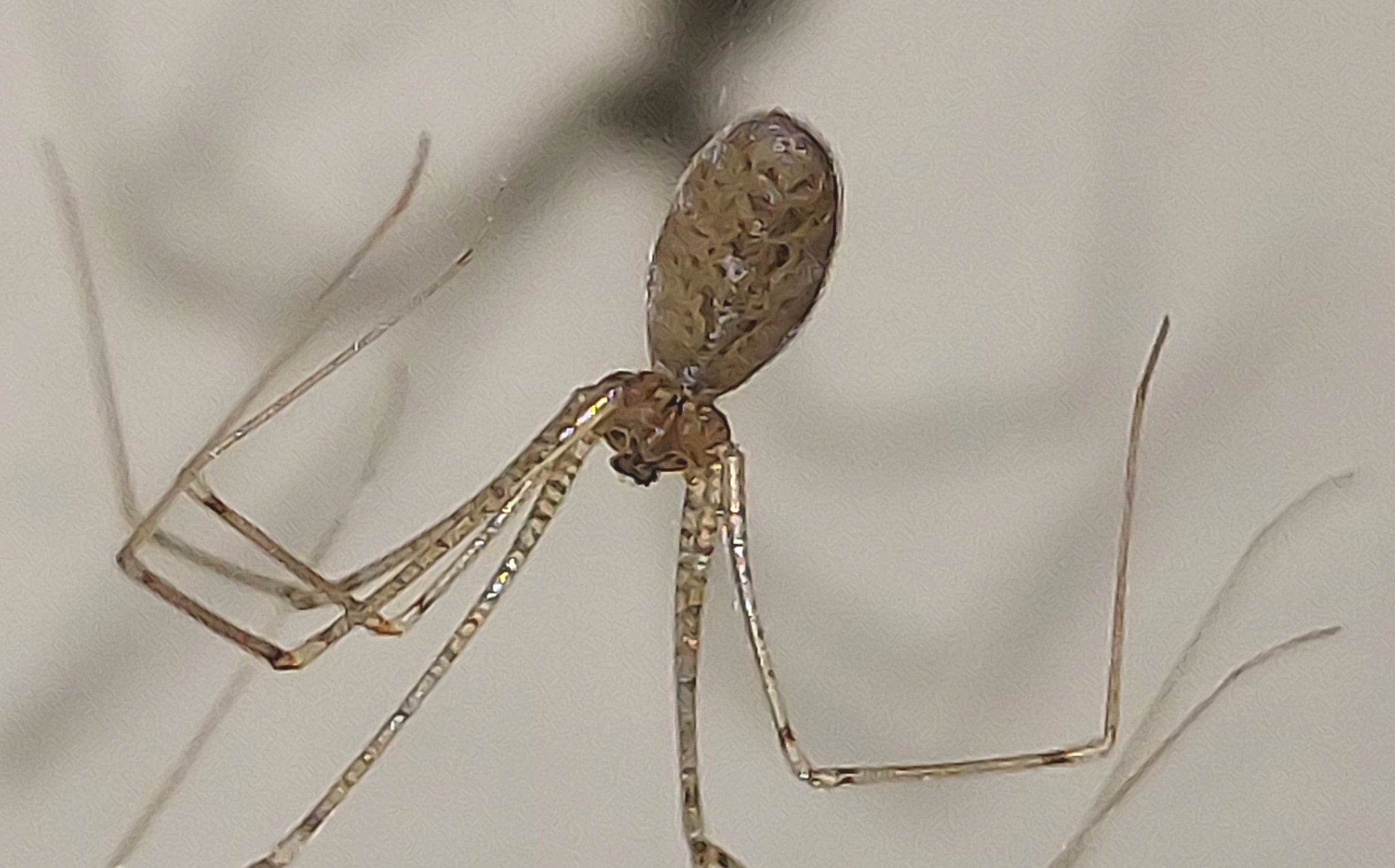
- female from Missouri

Scientific classification
- Kingdom: Animalia
- Phylum: Arthropoda
- Subphylum: Chelicerata
- Class: Arachnida
- Order: Araneae
- Infraorder: Araneomorphae
- Family: Pholcidae
- Genus: Pholcus
- Species: P. crypticolens

Binomial name
- Pholcus crypticolens Bösenberg & Strand, 1906

= Pholcus crypticolens =

Species of spider

Pholcus crypticolens is a species of cellar spider in the genus Pholcus first described by W. Bösenberg and Embrik Strand in 1906.

It is endemic to Japan, where it is commonly known as yurei-gumo (ユウレイグモ, "ghost spider").

== Distribution ==
P. crypticolens is distributed throughout Japan, including Hokkaido, Honshu, Shikoku, and Kyushu. The species has been recorded from various regions across these main islands, showing a wide distribution across the Japanese archipelago.

P. crypticolens seems to have been introduced to the United States.

== Habitat ==
This species inhabits a variety of environments from lowlands to mountainous regions. P. crypticolens typically constructs irregular webs in dimly lit locations such as hollows along roadsides, thickets, under exposed tree roots, beneath rocky overhangs, and under the eaves of buildings.

== Description ==
Pholcus crypticolens is a medium-sized cellar spider with females measuring 5–6 mm in body length and males slightly smaller at 4–5 mm. Like other members of the genus Pholcus, this species is characterized by extremely long, thin legs that are several times the length of the body. The species can be distinguished from the similar and more common Pholcus phalangioides by its smaller overall size.

The species belongs to the crypticolens species group within Pholcus, as defined in Huber's 2011 comprehensive revision of the genus. Detailed morphological descriptions and illustrations of the male and female genitalia can be found in this taxonomic treatment.

== Taxonomy ==
The species was originally described by W. Bösenberg and Embrik Strand in their 1906 work on Japanese spiders. The taxonomic history includes some confusion with related species, particularly concerning synonymy with Pholcus zichyi, which was proposed by Marusik and Koponen in 2000 but later rejected by Huber in his 2011 revision.

The species has been the subject of various taxonomic studies over the years, with detailed redescriptions provided by several Japanese arachnologists including Uyemura (1937), Saito (1959), and Yaginuma (1986).

The syntypes of Pholcus crypticolens are deposited in the Senckenberg Museum in Frankfurt am Main, Germany, consisting of two females, two males, and three juveniles.
