= Apokayana =

Scientific classification
- Kingdom: Animalia
- Phylum: Arthropoda
- Subphylum: Chelicerata
- Class: Arachnida
- Order: Araneae
- Infraorder: Araneomorphae
- Family: Pholcidae
- Genus: Apokayana; Huber, 2018

Type species
- Panjange kapit (Huber, 2016)

Species
- 10, see text

Genus of spiders

Apokayana is a genus of southeast Asian cellar spiders named after the Apo Kayan people of Indonesia and Malaysia. It was erected in 2018 for ten species transferred from Panjange after a molecular phylogenetic study of Pholcidae.

== Species ==
As of April 2022 it contains ten species, all native to Borneo:

- A. bako (Huber, 2011) – Malaysia (Borneo)
- A. iban (Huber, 2011) – Malaysia (Borneo)
- A. kapit (Huber, 2016) (type) – Malaysia (Borneo)
- A. kubah (Huber, 2016) – Malaysia (Borneo)
- A. niah (Huber, 2016) – Malaysia (Borneo)
- A. nigrifrons (Deeleman-Reinhold & Deeleman, 1983) – Indonesia (Borneo)
- A. pueh (Huber, 2016) – Malaysia (Borneo)
- A. sedgwicki (Deeleman-Reinhold & Platnick, 1986) – Malaysia (Borneo)
- A. seowi (Huber, 2016) – Malaysia (Borneo)
- A. tahai (Huber, 2011) – Indonesia (Borneo)

== See also ==
- Panjange
- Pholcus
- List of Pholcidae species
