= Pholcus persicus =

Scientific classification
- Kingdom: Animalia
- Phylum: Arthropoda
- Subphylum: Chelicerata
- Class: Arachnida
- Order: Araneae
- Infraorder: Araneomorphae
- Family: Pholcidae
- Genus: Pholcus
- Species: P. persicus

Binomial name
- Pholcus persicus Senglet, 1974

Species of Cellar spider

Pholcus persicus is a species of spider in the family Pholcidae. It was first described by Antoine Senglet in 1974. It is native to Iran.
