= Tissahamia maturata =

Scientific classification
- Kingdom: Animalia
- Phylum: Arthropoda
- Subphylum: Chelicerata
- Class: Arachnida
- Order: Araneae
- Infraorder: Araneomorphae
- Family: Pholcidae
- Genus: Tissahamia
- Species: T. maturata

Binomial name
- Tissahamia maturata (Huber, 2011)

Synonyms
- Pholcus maturata Huber, 2011

Species of spider

Tissahamia maturata is a species of spider in the family Pholcidae. It is endemic to Sri Lanka.

== Taxonomy ==
The species was first described in 2011 by Huber as Pholcus maturata. It was transferred to the new genus Tissahamia in 2018 as a result of a molecular phylogenetic study.

== See also ==
- List of Pholcidae species
