= Pholcus alticeps =

Scientific classification
- Kingdom: Animalia
- Phylum: Arthropoda
- Subphylum: Chelicerata
- Class: Arachnida
- Order: Araneae
- Infraorder: Araneomorphae
- Family: Pholcidae
- Genus: Pholcus
- Species: P. alticeps

Binomial name
- Pholcus alticeps Spassky, 1932

Species of spider

Pholcus alticeps is a species of araneomorph spiders found in Europe from Germany to Ukraine, and in Asia to Russia to Western Siberia, the Caucasus, Iran and Tadjikistan.
