= Pholcus fragillimus =

Scientific classification
- Kingdom: Animalia
- Phylum: Arthropoda
- Subphylum: Chelicerata
- Class: Arachnida
- Order: Araneae
- Infraorder: Araneomorphae
- Family: Pholcidae
- Genus: Pholcus
- Species: P. fragillimus

Binomial name
- Pholcus fragillimus Strand, 1907

Synonyms
- Pholcus acerosus Peng & Zhang, 2011

Species of spider

Pholcus fragillimus, is a species of spider of the genus Pholcus. It is distributed from Sri Lanka, India to Japan. The type material of Pholcus fragillimus has probably been destroyed in Stuttgart during the Second World War, and only one female is available now in museums.

== See also ==
- List of Pholcidae species
