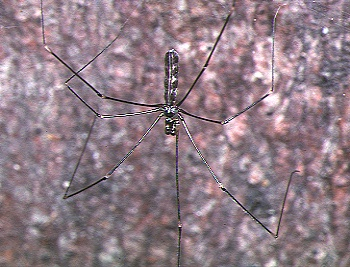

Scientific classification
- Kingdom: Animalia
- Phylum: Arthropoda
- Subphylum: Chelicerata
- Class: Arachnida
- Order: Araneae
- Infraorder: Araneomorphae
- Family: Pholcidae
- Genus: Pholcus
- Species: P. nagasakiensis

Binomial name
- Pholcus nagasakiensis Strand, 1916

= Pholcus nagasakiensis =

Species of spiders

Pholcus nagasakiensis is a species of cellar spider in the genus Pholcus. It is found in Japan.

== See also ==
- List of Pholcidae species
