= Pholcus abstrusus =

Scientific classification
- Kingdom: Animalia
- Phylum: Arthropoda
- Subphylum: Chelicerata
- Class: Arachnida
- Order: Araneae
- Infraorder: Araneomorphae
- Family: Pholcidae
- Genus: Pholcus
- Species: P. abstrusus

Binomial name
- Pholcus abstrusus Yao & Li, 2012

Species of spider

Pholcus abstrusus is a species of cellar spider (family Pholcidae).
