= Pholcus velitchkovskyi =

Scientific classification
- Kingdom: Animalia
- Phylum: Arthropoda
- Subphylum: Chelicerata
- Class: Arachnida
- Order: Araneae
- Infraorder: Araneomorphae
- Family: Pholcidae
- Genus: Pholcus
- Species: P. velitchkovskyi

Binomial name
- Pholcus velitchkovskyi Kulczynski, 1913

Species of spider

Pholcus velitchkovskyi is a cellar spider species found in Russia, Ukraine and Iran.

== See also ==
- List of Pholcidae species
