= Pholcus kwanaksanensis =

Scientific classification
- Kingdom: Animalia
- Phylum: Arthropoda
- Subphylum: Chelicerata
- Class: Arachnida
- Order: Araneae
- Infraorder: Araneomorphae
- Family: Pholcidae
- Genus: Pholcus
- Species: P. kwanaksanensis

Binomial name
- Pholcus kwanaksanensis Namkung & Kim, 1990

Species of spider

Pholcus kwanaksanensis, is a species of spider in the genus Pholcus, and was first described in 1990 by Joon Namkung and Joo-Pil Kim.

This spider is endemic to the Korean peninsula, and the species epithet, kwanaksanensis, describes it as being found on Mount Gwanak, in Seoul.

It weaves irregular webs in the crevices of rocks and on trees.
