= Pholcus ancoralis =

Scientific classification
- Kingdom: Animalia
- Phylum: Arthropoda
- Subphylum: Chelicerata
- Class: Arachnida
- Order: Araneae
- Infraorder: Araneomorphae
- Family: Pholcidae
- Genus: Pholcus
- Species: P. ancoralis

Binomial name
- Pholcus ancoralis L. Koch, 1865

Species of spider

Pholcus ancoralis is a species of spider of the genus Pholcus native to various island groups in the Pacific Ocean including the Ryukyu Islands of Japan, Hawaii, New Caledonia, French Polynesia, the Samoas, Marquesas and Cook Islands.

== See also ==
- List of Pholcidae species
