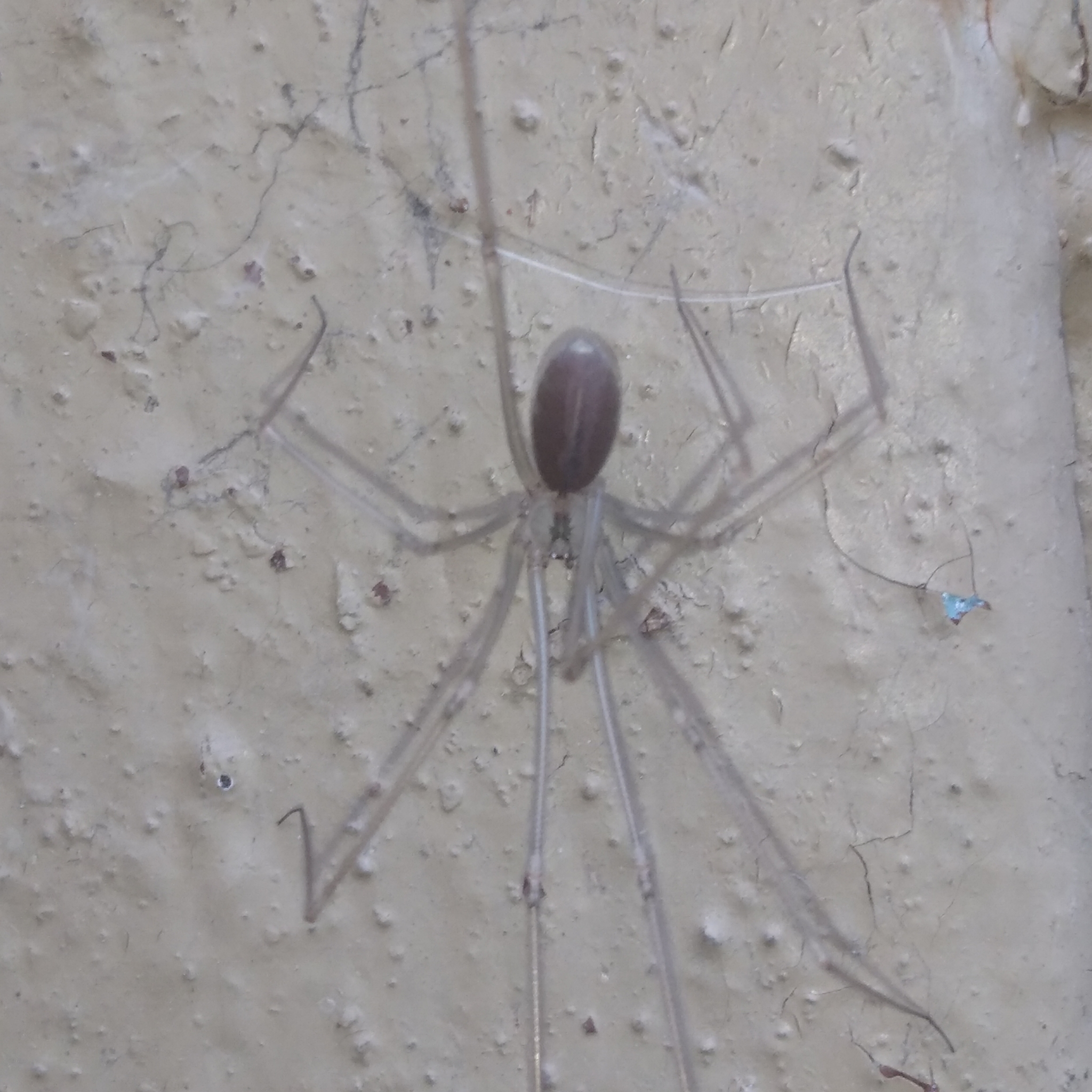

Scientific classification
- Kingdom: Animalia
- Phylum: Arthropoda
- Subphylum: Chelicerata
- Class: Arachnida
- Order: Araneae
- Infraorder: Araneomorphae
- Family: Pholcidae
- Genus: Pholcus
- Species: P. ponticus

Binomial name
- Pholcus ponticus Thorell, 1875

= Pholcus ponticus =

Species of spider

Pholcus ponticus is a species of cellar spider found from Bulgaria to China.

== Description ==
This species has a 5-6 mm long body with the prosoma being 1.4 mm long.

== See also ==
- List of Pholcidae species
