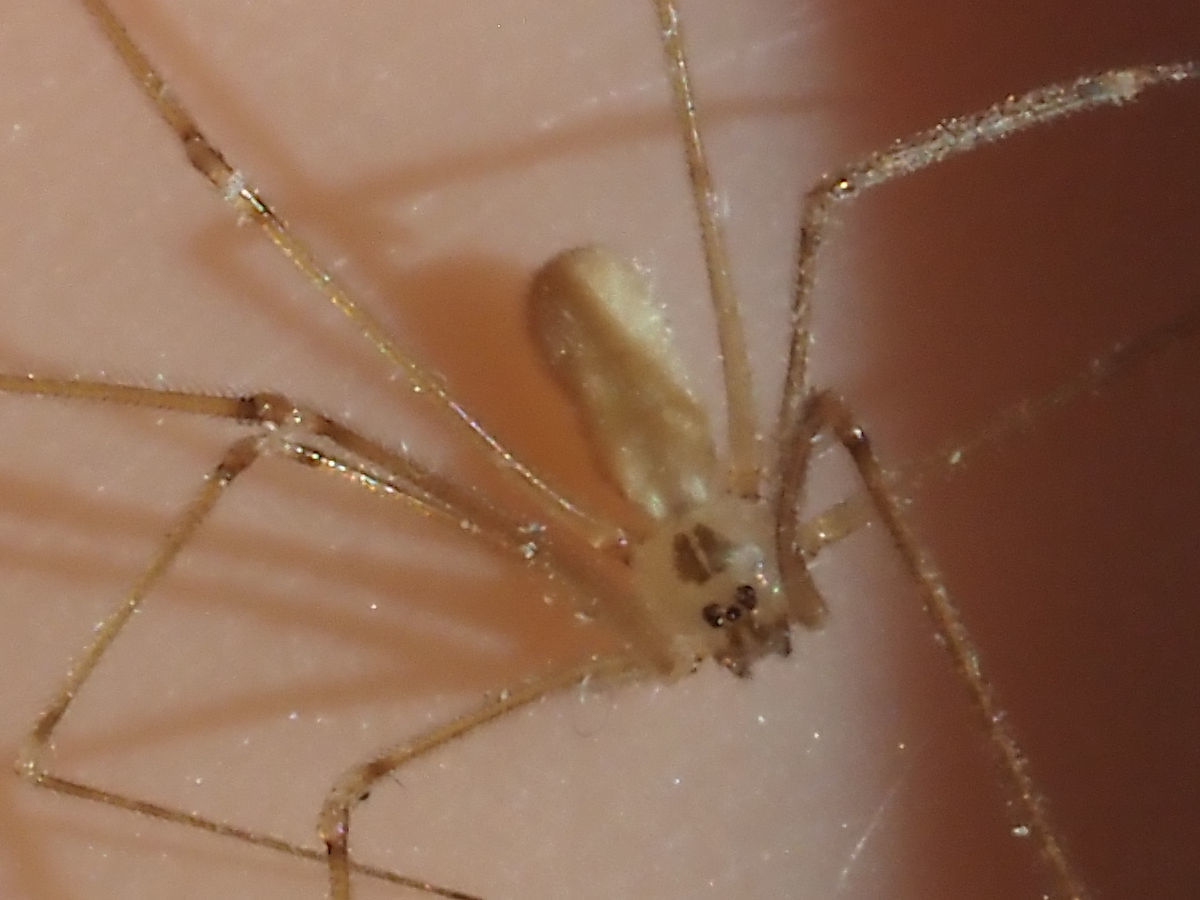

Scientific classification
- Kingdom: Animalia
- Phylum: Arthropoda
- Subphylum: Chelicerata
- Class: Arachnida
- Order: Araneae
- Infraorder: Araneomorphae
- Family: Pholcidae
- Genus: Pholcus
- Species: P. manueli

Binomial name
- Pholcus manueli Gertsch, 1937

= Pholcus manueli =

Species of spider

Pholcus manueli, known generally as the cellar spider or daddy longlegs, is a species of cellar spider in the family Pholcidae. It is found in Russia, Turkmenistan, China, Korea, Japan, and the United States.
