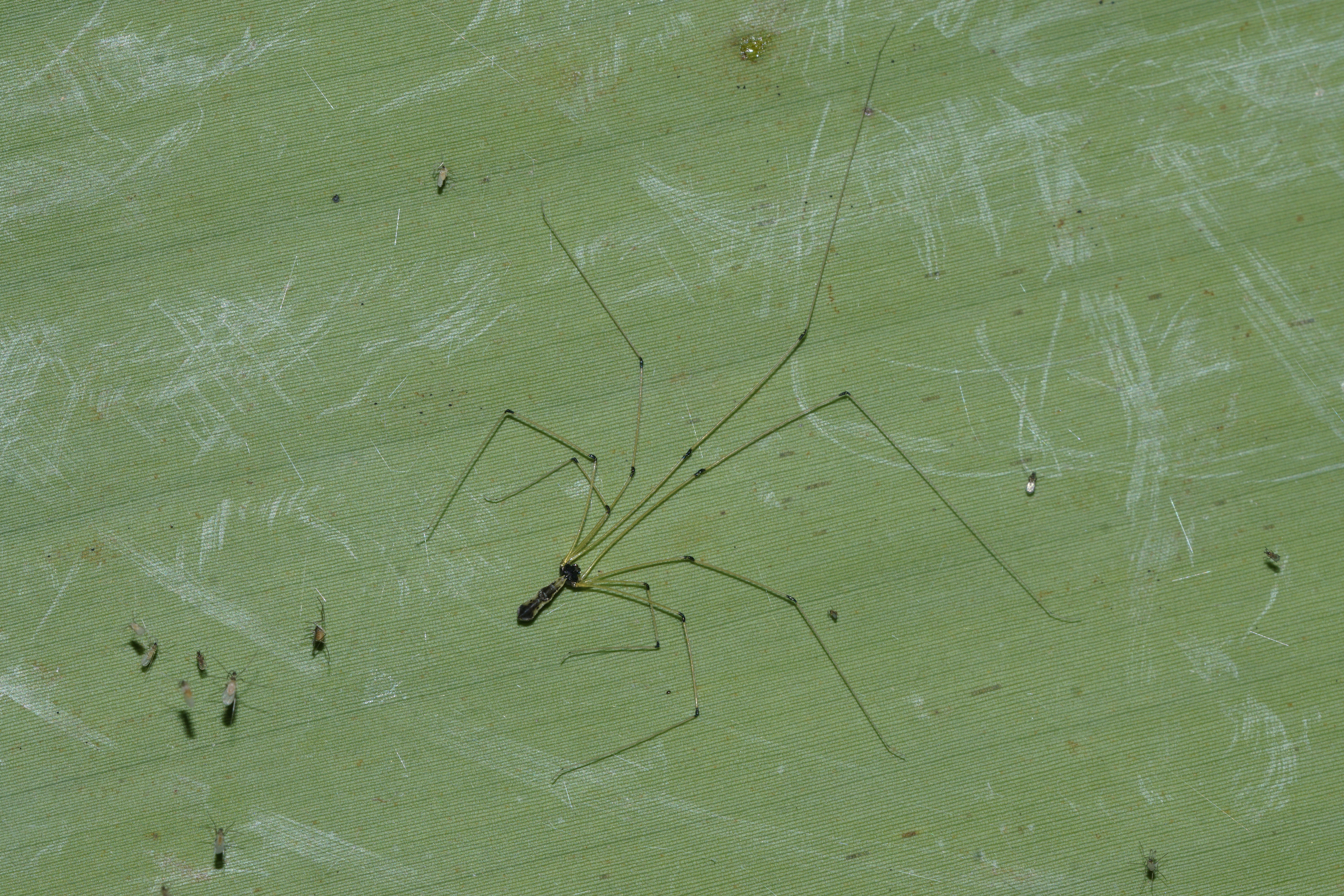

Scientific classification
- Kingdom: Animalia
- Phylum: Arthropoda
- Subphylum: Chelicerata
- Class: Arachnida
- Order: Araneae
- Infraorder: Araneomorphae
- Family: Pholcidae
- Genus: Uthina; Simon, 1893

Type species
- U. luzonica Simon, 1893

Species
- 17, see text

= Uthina (spider) =

Genus of spiders

Uthina is a genus of cellar spiders that was first described by Eugène Louis Simon in 1893.

== Species ==
As of June 2019 it contains seventeen species, found only in Africa, Asia, and Australia:

- Uthina huahinensis Yao & Li, 2016 – Thailand
- Uthina huifengi Yao & Li, 2016 – Thailand, Malaysia, Indonesia (Sumatra)
- Uthina hylobatea Huber, Caspar & Eberle, 2019 – Indonesia (Bali, Java)
- Uthina javaensis Yao & Li, 2016 – Indonesia (Java)
- Uthina khaosokensis Yao, Li & Jäger, 2014 – Thailand
- Uthina luzonica Simon, 1893 (type) – Sri Lanka, Thailand, Malaysia, Indonesia, Philippines, northern Australia, Pacific Is. Introduced to Seychelles, Réunion, Taiwan
- Uthina maya Huber, Caspar & Eberle, 2019 – Indonesia (Bali)
- Uthina mimpi Huber, Caspar & Eberle, 2019 – Indonesia (Sulawesi)
- Uthina muangensis Yao & Li, 2016 – Thailand
- Uthina potharamensis Yao & Li, 2016 – Thailand
- Uthina ratchaburi Huber, 2011 – Thailand
- Uthina saiyokensis Yao & Li, 2016 – Thailand
- Uthina sarikaensis Yao & Li, 2016 – Thailand
- Uthina sulawesiensis Yao & Li, 2016 – Indonesia (Sulawesi, Ternate)
- Uthina wongpromi Yao & Li, 2016 – Thailand
- Uthina yunchuni Yao & Li, 2016 – Thailand
- Uthina zhigangi Yao & Li, 2016 – Thailand

== See also ==
- List of Pholcidae species
