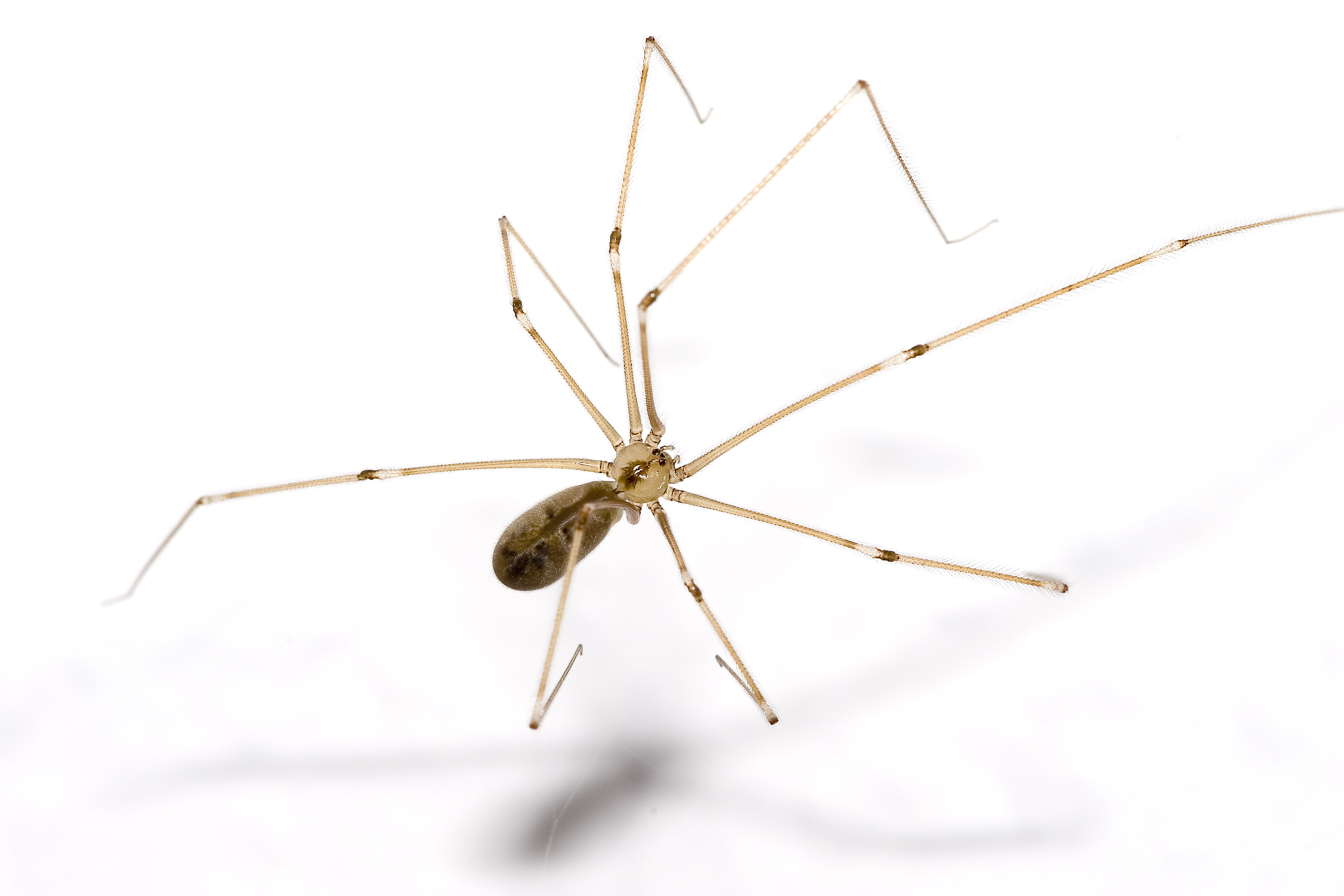

Scientific classification
- Kingdom: Animalia
- Phylum: Arthropoda
- Subphylum: Chelicerata
- Class: Arachnida
- Order: Araneae
- Infraorder: Araneomorphae
- Family: Pholcidae
- Genus: Pholcus
- Species: P. phalangioides

Binomial name
- Pholcus phalangioides (Fuesslin, 1775)

= Pholcus phalangioides =

Species of spider

Pholcus phalangioides, commonly known as the cosmopolitan cellar spider, long-bodied cellar spider, or one of various types called a daddy long-legs spider, is a spider of the family Pholcidae. It was first described in 1775 by the Swiss entomologist Johann Kaspar Füssli (his surname is also spelled Fuesslin) as Aranea phalangoides. Its common name of "daddy long-legs" should not be confused with a different arachnid group with the same common name, the harvestman (Opiliones), or the crane flies of the superfamily Tipuloidea.

Females have a body length of about 8 mm while males tend to be slightly smaller. The length of the spider's legs are on average 5 or 6 times the length of its body. Pholcus phalangioides has a habit of living on the ceilings of rooms, caves, garages or cellars.

This spider species is considered beneficial in parts of the world because it preys on other spiders, including species considered dangerous such as redback spiders. Pholcus phalangioides is known to be harmless to humans and a potential for the medicinal use of their silk has been reported.

== Taxonomy and phylogeny ==
Pholcus phalangioides was first described in 1775 by the Swiss entomologist Johann Kaspar Füssli. A member of the genus Pholcus in the family Pholcidae, P. phalangioides shares ancestry with roughly 1,340 similar cellar-spiders. All of these spiders are known for their characteristic long legs, which can range from 5 to 6 times the size of their bodies. This is not to be confused with organisms with similar physical appearances, such as the crane fly – an insect – and harvestmen of the arachnid order Opiliones.

=== Genetic population structure ===
The population sizes of P. phalangioides are influenced greatly by the presence of human-made buildings since these spiders prefer warmer habitats indoors. The large number of buildings in the world has favoured P. phalangioides, though populations tend to be relatively small, widely dispersed, and greatly isolated from one another. This small size combined with low mobility of populations results in an increased importance placed on the role of genetic drift, more specifically the founder effect, on population structure. Although some gene flow does exist between populations, its importance has been insignificant when compared to that of geographical isolation-driven genetic drift. As a result, most P. phalangioides individuals of the same population that live in the same geographical region will have a very low degree of genetic variation (intrapopulation differentiation). On the other hand, this genetic drift results in significant interpopulation differentiation.

== Description ==
The eye arrangement of spiders in the genus Pholcus

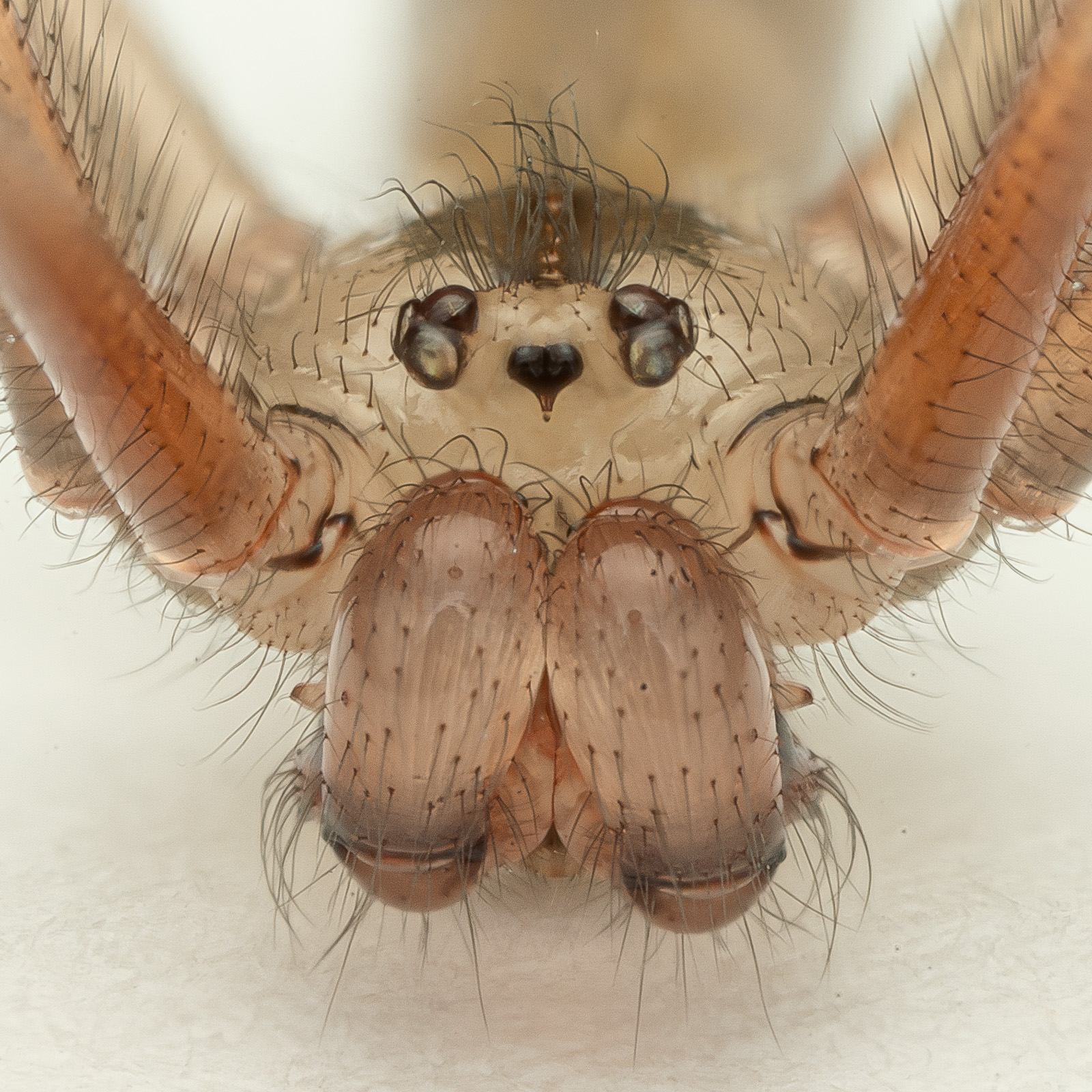
The eye arrangement of P. phalangioides

Pholcus phalangioides are sexually dimorphic, where females are slightly larger than the males of the species. The body length of this species varies between males and females. Males tend to be around 6 to 10 mm in length with the average male being around 6 mm. The average female ranges from 7 to 8 mm in length. As indicated by their common name, "daddy long-legs" (in North America), these spiders boast eight very long and thin legs which are covered in thin, grey bristles. On average, their legs are roughly 5 to 6 times as long as the spider's body. The average length of an adult female's legs is roughly 50 mm.

The bodies of P. phalangioides, as with all spiders, can be divided into two parts: the prosoma and the opisthosoma. The prosoma is commonly known as the cephalothorax, and the opisthosoma is commonly known as the abdomen. Most of the prosoma is occupied by the brain. The opisthosoma is considered the posterior part of the body which contains most of the spider's internal organs including the heart, respiratory system, mid-gland, reproductive system, genital tract and silk glands. The translucent bodies of P. phalangioides tend to be a grey-pale brown color with a dark spot on the back of the prosoma and some dark, blurred spots on the dorsal side of the opisthosoma.

Although some other members of the family Pholcidae have six eyes, Pholcus phalangioides is an eight-eyed spider. The eyes are arranged such that there is a pair of smaller, dark eyes at the front of the prosoma followed by three parallel rows of pairs of larger eyes.

Similar to other species of spider, a hard exoskeleton coats the bodies of P. phalangioides. Depending on the age of the spider, this exoskeleton must be shed at differing intervals; younger spiders tend to molt much more often. During molting, the spider will produce certain enzymes that release the rest of its body from the underlying tissue of its exoskeleton. The spider is then able to escape the exoskeleton. The remnant outer skin or exoskeleton is known as the exuviae.

It takes about one year for these spiders to mature after they are born, and their life span is up to two years or more post-maturity.

== Distribution and habitat ==
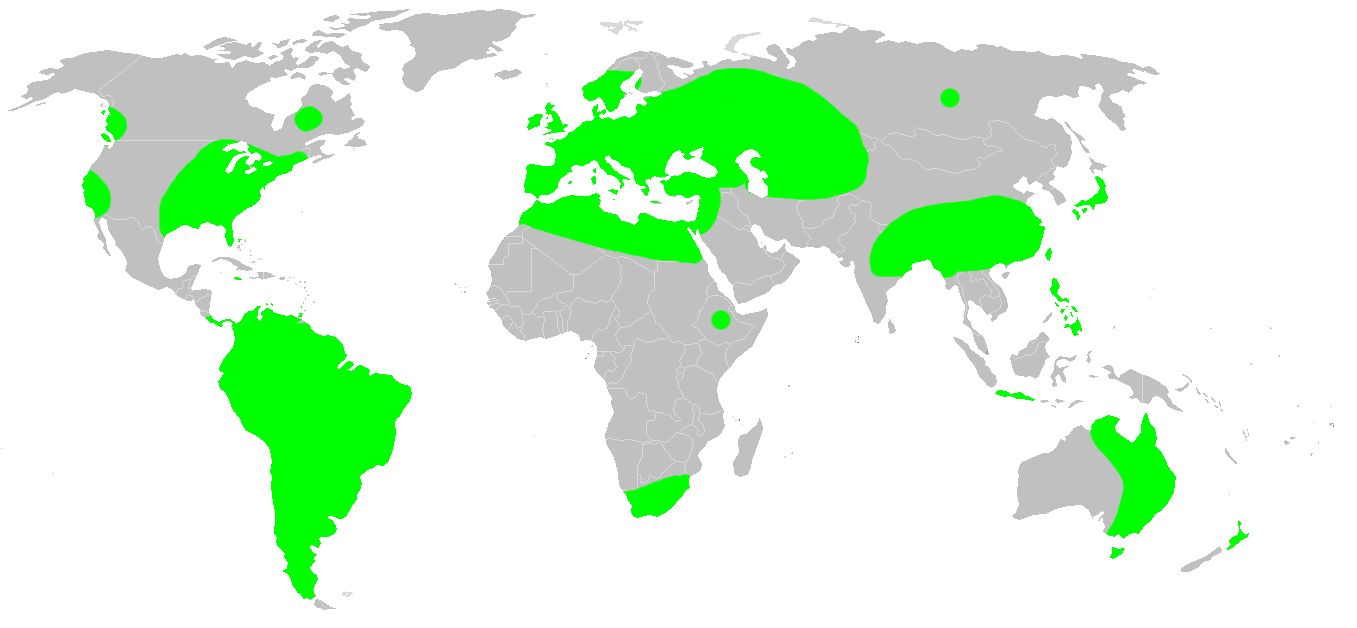
Distribution of P. phalangioides

Because of its spread with humans worldwide, there has been some uncertainty about its exact original, native range, although it has been recognized as being likely in the subtropical parts of the Afro-Eurasia, thus with a preference for warmer climates, and recent authorities regards it as only native to Asia. As a synanthropic species, Pholcus phalangioides has largely had its modern geographic distribution determined by the spread of humans around the world. Today, these spiders can be found in most of the temperate countries of every continent in the world.

P. phalangioides are not suited for survival in cold environments, which is why they prefer the warmth of the indoors when in these regions, specifically inside human dwellings. These spiders have a particular affinity for dimly lit, dark areas that are quiet and calm. They are commonly found in the corners of buildings and people's homes as well as in attics. Populations of Pholcus phalangioides living outdoors can be found in caves and in between rock crevices.

== Diet ==
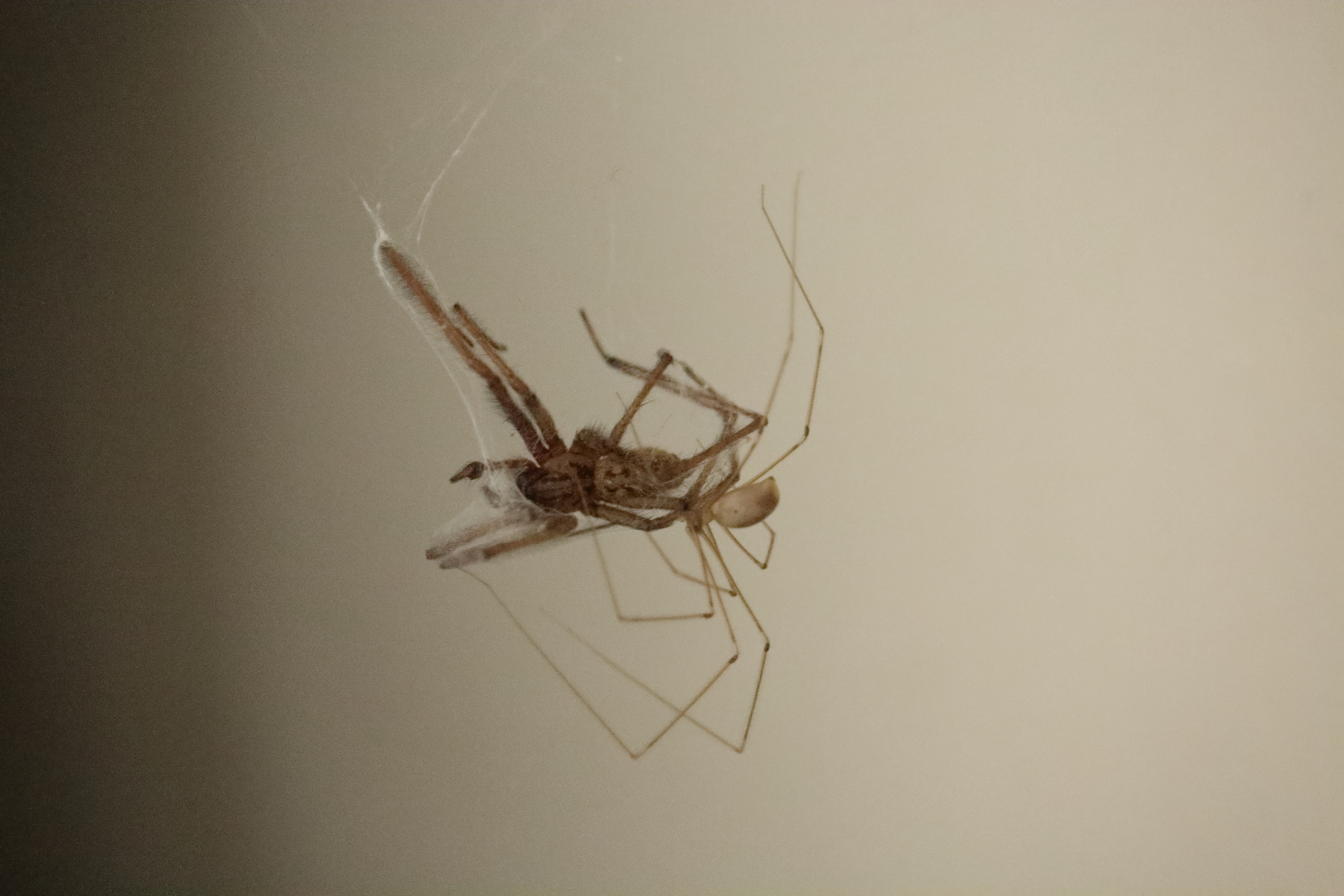
Tegenaria domestica preyed by Pholcus phalangioides

P. phalangioides are carnivorous predators that feed on insects, other spiders, and other small invertebrates. Unlike many other spiders, who simply feed on prey that have gotten stuck in their webs, these spiders frequently venture out from their own webs to hunt other spiders resting in their respective webs and feed on them or their eggs. In times of low prey availability, both the males and females of the species will turn to cannibalism to meet their nutritional needs.

== General ethology ==
=== Web patterns ===
In general, the webs of P. phalangioides are loose and horizontal with many irregularities. These webs are often intertwined with webs of other spiders of the same population. They live peacefully unless resources are low at which point the spiders turn to cannibalism.

=== Communication ===
The extent of the P. phalangioides communication is seen in times of mating. The primary form of communication for these spiders is through the use of touch and chemicals, specifically pheromones.

== Predation behaviors ==
=== Predators ===
This species is preyed upon by jumping spiders of the Salticidae family. Some of these spiders simply leap into the webs of their prey and attack them. Others employ a certain strategy known as mimicry in order to trick P. phalangioides and capture them.

A jumping spider whose aggressive mimicry behavior towards P. phalangioides has been well studied is the species Portia fimbriata. During mimicry, the jumping spider produces certain specialized vibrations near the edge of the webs of P. phalangioides. These vibrations cause the webs of P. phalangioides to oscillate in such a way that they mimic the oscillations that would be produced when a form of prey gets stuck in the web. The jumping spider will then continue on with these vibrations for very long durations of time, up to three days in some instances. P. phalangioides often assume that this is an indication that they have caught some sort of prey and will move toward the host of the vibrations. At this point, the jumping spider is in an optimal position to leap onto and attack P. phalangioides, thus subduing them in many instances. In addition to employing mimicry, these jumping spiders are also particularly good at preventing P. phalangioides from inducing their whirling defense mechanism, which tends to be an effective way for P. phalangioides spiders to defend themselves from predators.

=== Defensive behavior ===
The primary defense strategy performed by P. phalangioides in moments of predation is whirling. Whirling, or a gyration of the body, consists of the spider swinging its body around in a circle repeatedly while its legs remain fixed on the web. This whirling strategy is induced as soon as the individual recognizes any sort of movement occurring in its web. The duration of this whirling is related to the specific kind of predator that the spider encounters. Short-duration whirling can be induced simply by a human touching the spider's web or occasionally by spider of a different species. Long-duration whirling, which can last several hours or even days, is performed specifically in response to the presence of the more threatening Salticid, or jumping spiders, much more often than for spiders of other families. The rapid gyrating associated with the whirling disturbs the vision of the Salticid spiders such that they can no longer rely on their acute eyesight to pinpoint the location of P. phalangioides. This disruption results in the safety of the spiders from an otherwise deadly predator.

=== Mimicry ===
Much like the Salticidae family of spiders, P. phalangioides also use mimicry as a predatory tactic to subdue their prey; however, unlike jumping spiders, P. phalangioides do not rely on vision for predation. This mimicry consists of creating specialized vibrations to trick the prey into thinking that it has caught an insect or another spider. The prey then slowly approaches its supposed catch at which point the P. phalangioides spider raises up on its long legs. The spider patiently waits until the exact moment at which the prey touches one of its legs. Then, the P. phalangioides spider quickly immobilizes its prey by using its legs to wrap it up in layers of silk. Its long legs give it plenty of distance from the prey to avoid being bitten in retaliation. After immobilizing its prey, P. phalangioides can administer their venomous bite to the prey and consume it.

Even forms of prey that do not fully make it onto the web of P. phalangioides are not safe. Often, prey will trip over the edges of the web, thus providing P. phalangioides with an optimal time to attack. P. phalangioides is capable of clinging onto their web with two of their legs while the rest of their body leans out of the web and shoots silk in the direction of the prey to subdue it.

== Bite ==
It is a common misconception that P. phalangioides is incapable of biting humans due to an inability of their fangs to penetrate the human epidermis. These spiders can bite humans since their fangs are roughly 0.25 mm long, while the thickness of the human epidermis is less, around 0.1 mm thick; however, there are hardly any reports on bites.

=== Venom ===
Although these spiders are capable of hunting and killing some of the most venomous spiders in the world such as the redback spider, they are not dangerous to humans. According to researchers Greta Binford and Pamela Zobel-Thropp, the effects of P. phalangioides venom on humans and other mammals are negligible. In humans, the P. phalangioides bite simply results in a mild stinging sensation that has no long-term health consequences.

== Reproduction ==
=== Male genitalia ===
==== Overall genital system structure ====
The genital system of an adult male P. phalangioides is located in the ventral portion of the opisthosoma and can be characterized by a large pair of testes and thin, twisted vasa deferentia which become thicker upon nearing the genital opening of the male pedipalp. These vasa deferentia distally fuse creating the ductus ejaculatorius of the spider. The ductus ejaculatorius is composed of lumen which contains large quantities of spermatozoa and other secretions. This variety of secretions is not seen in subadult males whose lumen only contains dense secretion matrix. Ventrally surrounding specific portions of the genital tract are apullate silk glands, and overall, the genital system is bordered by parts of the midgut gland. All stages of spermatogenesis are apparent in the adult testes, and the spermatozoa are coiled. In order to reach this stage with a fully formed male genital system, P. phalangioides must first go through two subadult phases.

==== Stages of genital development ====
The first stage occurs roughly four weeks before the spider's final molt. Unlike adult males, young males possess a broad tarsus that does not appear to consist of any internal structures or appendages. Their pedipalps are greatly bent at a joint connecting the between the tibia and patella. The testes at this point in the young male's life appear very similar to those of the adult males both in terms of physical structure and presence of all stages of spermatogenesis. This spermatogenesis takes place in cysts which contain spermatids. During this time, there is very little observable secretory activity in the testes. In a similar manner to the adult genital system, the vas deferens in young males is connected to the distal, thin part of the testis. The distal portion of the vas deferens is incredibly narrow and is not characterized by the presence of spermatozoa or other secretions. On the other hand, the proximal region consists of a thick epithelium and intricate luminal region containing spermatozoa.

The second stage of development is observed two weeks prior the spider's final molt. At this point, the pedipalps of the spider are only partially bent, and the internal structures of the tarsus can be seen. The testes are dimensionally very similar to those of subadult stage one males and adult males. The distal portion of the vas deferens becomes thinner and twists in a tube-like shape. Spermatozoa and other secretions are extensively present in proximal portion of the vas deferens. But similar to the stage one males, these males still do not appear to contain any sort of secretions or spermatozoa in the distal portion of the vas deferens. This is in contrast to adults where spermatozoa are present in all regions of the vas deferens.

==== Spermatogenesis ====
Spermatogenesis for males of the P. phalangioides species commences weeks before maturity and continues throughout their lives.

=== Female genitalia ===
Many female spiders possess sac-like structures where sperm from the male spider is stored; however, females of the P. phalangioides species do not have these receptaculum seminis. Instead, the posterior wall of uterus externus, or genital cavity, serves as the site of sperm storage. The females have two accessory glands located in the dorsal part of the uterus externus. These glands release a secretion into the uterus externus which functions as a matrix to hold the male spermatozoa and seminal fluid in place upon copulation. These accessory glands are composed of multiple glandular units, they themselves consisting of two secretory and envelope cells each. The inner and outer envelope cells surround the secretory cells and serve to create a cuticular ductule or canal that runs from the secretory cells to the two pore plates located on the uterus externus. These pore plates are the exit sites for the aforementioned glandular secretion into the uterus externus.

== Mating behaviors ==
=== Courtship ===
Male courtship in P. phalangioides can be observed in four different steps: abdominal vibrations, tapping of the female's web, web jerking, and tapping the female's legs. In order to mate with the females, the males must perform courtship in a manner which will not result in the female assuming that the male is prey. Otherwise, the male would be attacked.

As the males approach the females, they begin to do a series of rapid dorso-ventral vibrations with their opisthosoma. This only occurs once the females have noticed the presence of the males. The males then use the ventral portion of their tarsus to begin tapping on the web of the female. This tapping can last up to twenty minutes as the male inches closer to the female. Then, using claws on their tarsus, the males hook onto the web and perform rapid jerk movements using their legs. On average, this jerking lasts for a few minutes with each jerk lasting less than half of a second. In between sequences of jerking, the males continue to move closer to the females. The males then tap on the female's legs with their cephalothorax positioned downwards for, on average, eight minutes. At this point, receptive females will take on a specific position in which they are motionless with their opisthosoma turned horizontally and their legs extended outward. Before coupling, many of the males will use their pedipalps to cut certain parts of the web closest to the female.

=== Copulation ===
Copulation begins as the males use their chelicerae to rapidly move back and forth across the female's ventral body surface. This is an attempt to grab hold of the female's body and mount onto their epigyne. For some males, it can take up to 100 attempts to properly mount. Once mounted, the males pull the females closer to them resulting in rotation of the female opisthosoma from a horizontal to vertical position. At this point, the male is able to insert his pedipalps into the genital cavity of the female. During the multiple insertions, the male pedipalps are twisted into different motions in a synchronous fashion with the procursi being inserted deeply into the female genital cavity to release sperm into the uterus externus. As the coupling duration lengthens, the amount of palpal insertions decreases. The duration of copulation is dependent upon whether or not the female P. phalangioides have previously mated with any males. If the females have mated, second males are only allowed to engage in copulation for a few minutes. On the other hand, first males are able to copulate for anywhere between 16 and 122 minutes. Once the mating has finished, the females often act aggressively towards the males in an attempt to drive them off.

=== Male competition ===
Because palpal, or genital bulb, movements from the males result in the displacement of spermatozoa and other seminal fluid from the female uterus externus, sperm competition exists between males of the P. Phalangioides species. A rival male can attempt to displace the sperm of another male from the female's genital cavity by copulating with her; however, because the copulation duration is greatly decreased in second males, and thus there is less time to displace a rival's sperm, it is unlikely that the spermatozoa of rival, second male would greatly outnumber those of the first male in the uterus externus.

== Biomedical applications ==
=== Medicinal benefit ===
The use of spider silk in the medical field has gained much recognition over the last twenty years. Silk has been praised for its wound healing purposes because it contains compounds such as vitamin K. Spider silk is primarily composed of proteins made up of non-polar amino acids such as glycine and alanine. However, it also contains the organic compound pyrrolidine which functions to hold the silk's moisture and potassium nitrate which prevents any fungal or bacterial growth from occurring on the silk.

=== Antibacterial activity ===
Certain antimicrobial biomolecules found in the spider silk of P. phalangioides are able to elicit an inhibitory effect on drug-resistant human pathogens including gram-positive bacteria L. monocytogenes, gram-negative E. coli, Staphylococcus aureus, Bacillus subtilis, and Pseudomonas aeruginosa. More generally, researchers are hoping that the anti-microbial biomolecules of this spider silk could serve as a natural anti-microbial agent in the future against a host of infectious bacterial diseases that are resistant to antibiotics.

=== Biological imaging ===
Spiders are capable of spinning a multitude of unique silks. These silks vary in compounds and proteins that they consist of and in their use for the spider. One specific type of silk, known as dragline silk, is of particular interest to researchers due to its high elasticity, toughness, and large tensile strength. This silk has been shown to be significantly stronger than steel of the same weight. Dragline silk serves as the spider's attachment to its web should it need to retreat from predators or just go back in general. This silk also forms the radial spokes of a spider's web.

To examine the potential role of this dragline silk in biological imaging, resin was dripped onto the fibers of Pholcus phalangioides silk. As it condensed, the silk molded naturally into a dome or lens shape. By shining a laser onto this lens, researchers were able to generate high-quality photonic nanojets (PNJs), or high-intensity scattered beams of light. These photonic nanojets could be adjusted by manipulating the amount of time that the silk spends in contact with the resin. This adjustable spider silk-based lens could be used in the future for biological tissue imaging, highlighting the biomedical importance of P. phalangioides.
