= Paiwana =

Scientific classification
- Kingdom: Animalia
- Phylum: Arthropoda
- Subphylum: Chelicerata
- Class: Arachnida
- Order: Araneae
- Infraorder: Araneomorphae
- Family: Pholcidae
- Genus: Paiwana; Huber, 2018

Type species
- Pholcus pingtung (Huber & Dimitrov, 2014)

Species
- Paiwana chengpoi (Huber & Dimitrov, 2014); Paiwana pingtung (Huber & Dimitrov, 2014)

Genus of spiders

Paiwana is a small genus of east Asian cellar spiders named after the Paiwan people. The genus was erected in 2018 for two species transferred from Pholcus after a molecular phylogenetic study of Pholcidae. Males are distinguished by unique sclerotized modifications to the chelicerae, and females by the unique triangular epigynum shape. As of April 2022 it contains only two species, both native to Taiwan: P. chengpoi and P. pingtung.

== See also ==
- Pholcus
- List of Pholcidae species
