= Muruta =

Scientific classification
- Kingdom: Animalia
- Phylum: Arthropoda
- Subphylum: Chelicerata
- Class: Arachnida
- Order: Araneae
- Infraorder: Araneomorphae
- Family: Pholcidae
- Genus: Muruta; Huber, 2018

Type species
- Pholcus tambunan (Huber, 2016)

Species
- Muruta bario (Huber, 2016); Muruta tambunan (Huber, 2016)

Genus of spiders

Muruta is a small genus of southeast Asian cellar spiders named after the Murut people. It was erected in 2018 for two species transferred from Pholcus after a molecular phylogenetic study of Pholcidae. They are average size for cellar spiders with relatively long legs, the first legs averaging 35 to 40 millimetres (1.4 to 1.6 in) long. Males can be distinguished from other species by hairless, flat sclerites on their chelicerae, and females can be distinguished by three-layered telescopic tubes in their genital structure. As of April 2022 it contains only two species, both native to northern Borneo: M. bario and M. tambunan.

== See also ==
- Pholcus
- List of Pholcidae species
