= Meraha =

Scientific classification
- Kingdom: Animalia
- Phylum: Arthropoda
- Subphylum: Chelicerata
- Class: Arachnida
- Order: Araneae
- Infraorder: Araneomorphae
- Family: Pholcidae
- Genus: Meraha; Huber, 2018

Type species
- Pholcus krabi (Huber, 2016)

Species
- 7, see text

Genus of spiders

Meraha is a genus of southeast Asian cellar spiders. The genus was erected in 2018 for two species transferred from Pholcus after a molecular phylogenetic study of Pholcidae. The name is derived from the Malay "merah", meaning "red", referring to the reddish-orange hue of pedipalps. They are average sized cellar spiders with a cylindrical abdomen, and they build domed webs .5 to 2 metres (1 ft 8 in to 6 ft 7 in) above the ground.

== Species ==
As of April 2022 it contains seven species:

- M. chiangdao (Huber, 2011) – Thailand
- M. khene (Huber, 2011) – Laos, Vietnam
- M. kinabalu (Huber, 2011) – Malaysia (Borneo)
- M. kipungit (Huber, 2016) – Malaysia (Borneo)
- M. krabi (Huber, 2016) (type) – Thailand
- M. narathiwat (Huber, 2016) – Thailand
- M. shuye (Yao & Li, 2017) – Indonesia (Borneo)

== See also ==
- Pholcus
- List of Pholcidae species
