= Calapnita =

Scientific classification
- Kingdom: Animalia
- Phylum: Arthropoda
- Subphylum: Chelicerata
- Class: Arachnida
- Order: Araneae
- Infraorder: Araneomorphae
- Family: Pholcidae
- Genus: Calapnita; Simon, 1892

Type species
- C. vermiformis Simon, 1892

Species
- 15, see text

Genus of spiders

Calapnita is a genus of Southeast Asian cellar spiders that was first described by Eugène Louis Simon in 1892.

== Species ==
As of June 2019 it contains fifteen species, found in the Philippines, Thailand, Laos, and Indonesia:

- Calapnita bariengi Huber, 2017 – Malaysia (Borneo)
- Calapnita bario Huber, 2017 – Malaysia (Borneo)
- Calapnita bohoi Huber, 2017 – Philippines (Bohoi Is.)
- Calapnita bugis Huber, 2017 – Indonesia (Sulawesi)
- Calapnita dayak Huber, 2017 – Indonesia (Borneo)
- Calapnita dinagat Huber, 2017 – Philippines (Dinagat Is.)
- Calapnita lawangan Huber, 2017 – Indonesia (Borneo)
- Calapnita loksado Huber, 2017 – Indonesia (Borneo)
- Calapnita longa Yao & Li, 2013 – Laos
- Calapnita mae Huber, 2017 – Philippines (Mindanao)
- Calapnita magaseng Huber, 2017 – Malaysia (Borneo)
- Calapnita maragusan Huber, 2017 – Philippines (Mindanao)
- Calapnita nunezae Huber, 2017 – Philippines (Mindanao, Camiguin Is.)
- Calapnita saluang Huber, 2011 – Thailand, Malaysia (mainland), Indonesia (Sumatra, Java)
- Calapnita vermiformis Simon, 1892 (type) – Philippines

== See also ==
- List of Pholcidae species
