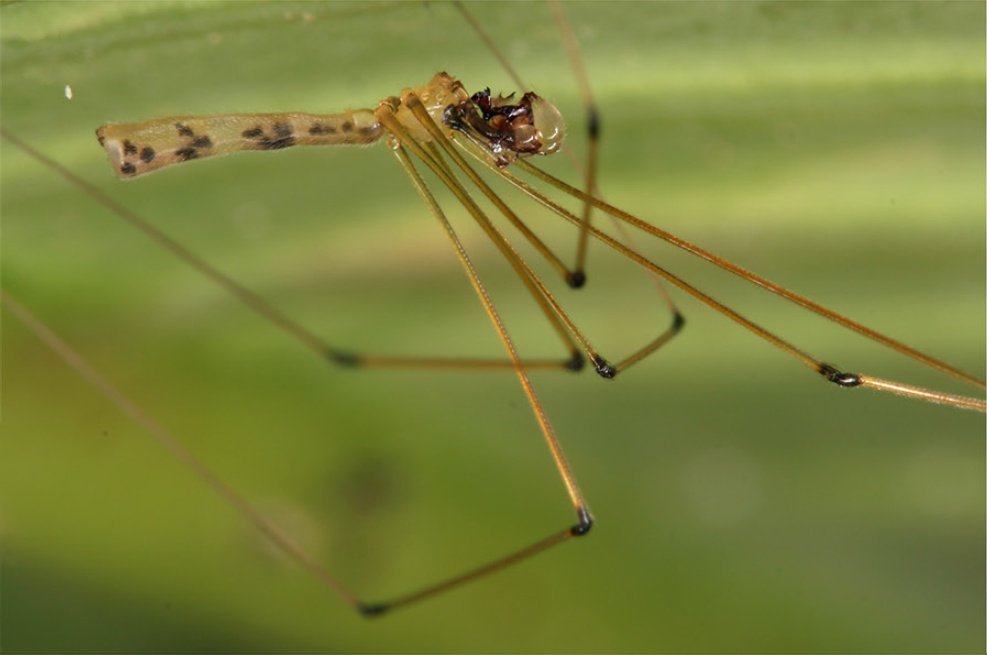
- Male Panjange casaroro

Scientific classification
- Domain: Eukaryota
- Kingdom: Animalia
- Phylum: Arthropoda
- Subphylum: Chelicerata
- Class: Arachnida
- Order: Araneae
- Infraorder: Araneomorphae
- Family: Pholcidae
- Genus: Panjange; Deeleman-Reinhold & Deeleman, 1983

Type species
- Panjange lanthana Deeleman-Reinhold & Deeleman, 1983

= Panjange =

Genus of spiders

Panjange is a genus of leaf-dwelling spiders in the family Pholcidae, widely distributed in the islands of Southeast Asia from Borneo and the Philippines to northern Australia. Panjange spiders exhibit some of the most extraordinary morphology among Pholcidae. Males of most species have eye stalks, sometimes with long pointed processes; males of some species have unusually elongated pedipalps, which in spiders function as copulatory organs; and females of some species have external portions of their genitalia strongly folded and extensible. The biological significance of these sexual modifications remain unclear.

== Naming and etymology ==
The genus Panjange was established in 1983 by biologists Christa L. Deeleman-Reinhold and P. R. Deeleman, to accommodate four new species. The genus derives from the Malay word panjang, meaning long and slender.

== Description ==
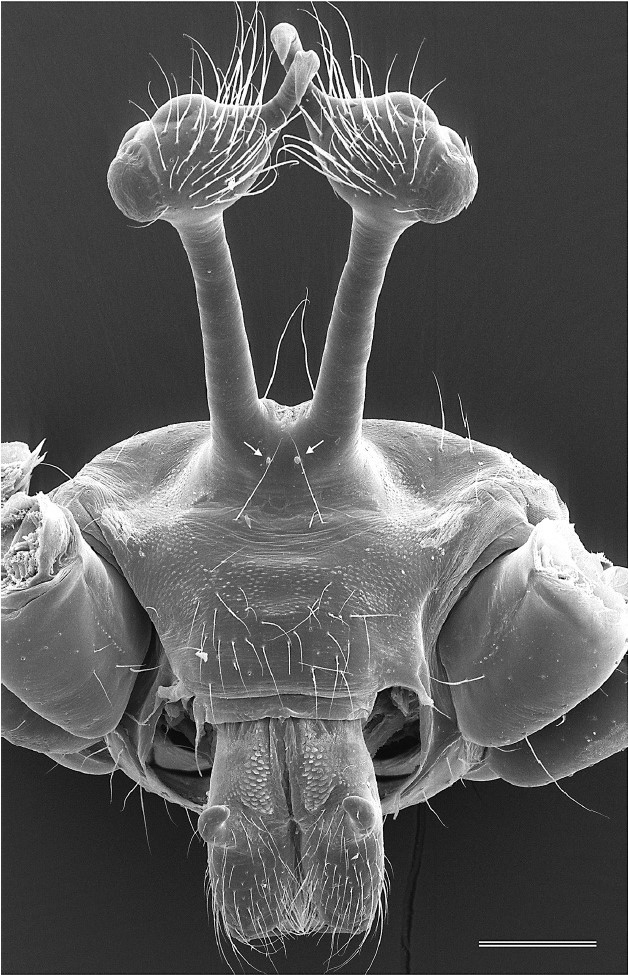
Male P. camiguin, frontal view, showing elongated eyestalks with pointed processes

Panjange spiders are light yellow in color, with brownish patterning on the body. There are six eyes in two small groups: in males the eyes are situated on two stalks or turret-like structures.

== Species and distribution ==
The 18 species of Panjange are divided into three species groups: the nigrifrons group on Borneo (containing P. bako P. iban, P. nigrifons, and P. sedgwiki); the cavicola group ranging from Sulawesi to northern Australia (comprising P. alba, P. cavicola, P. mirabilis, P. madang, and P. dubia); and the lanthana group in the Philippines, comprising P. bukidnon, P. camiguin, P. casaroro, P. dinagat, P. hamiguitan, P. isarog, P. lanthana, P. malagos, and P. marilog).

== Natural history ==
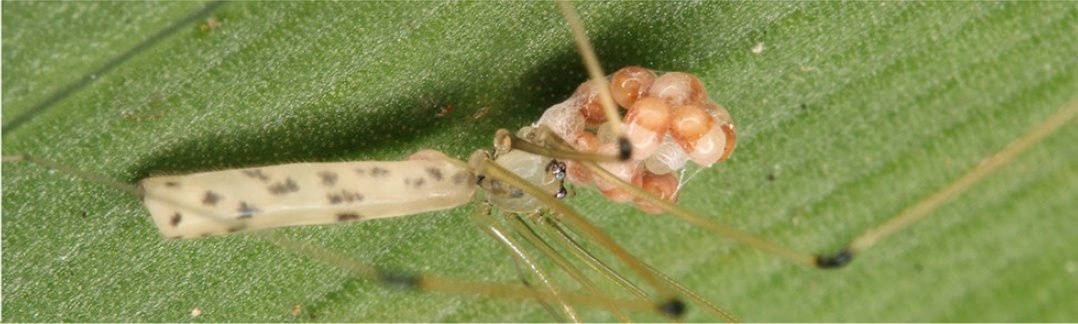
Female P. camiguin with egg sac parasitized by a wasp

In the Philippines (lanthana group), most species seem to have low abundances and very patchy distributions, with few specimens found within a very small area and none in surrounding areas of apparently similar vegetation. This may have been related to the low abundance and patchiness of suitable large leaves. Specimens are usually collected between about 50 cm above ground to about 2 m, and they are likely to occur also in higher strata of the forest, possibly in higher abundances. The web is a domed sheet, most of which is closely attached to the underside of a leaf. The extremely fine silk is poorly visible except when the sheet is viewed directly from the side. Egg sacs are only slightly elongated and covered by a barely visible layer of silk. In one case (P. camiguin) eight of ten eggs in an egg sac were parasitized by a parasitic wasp.
