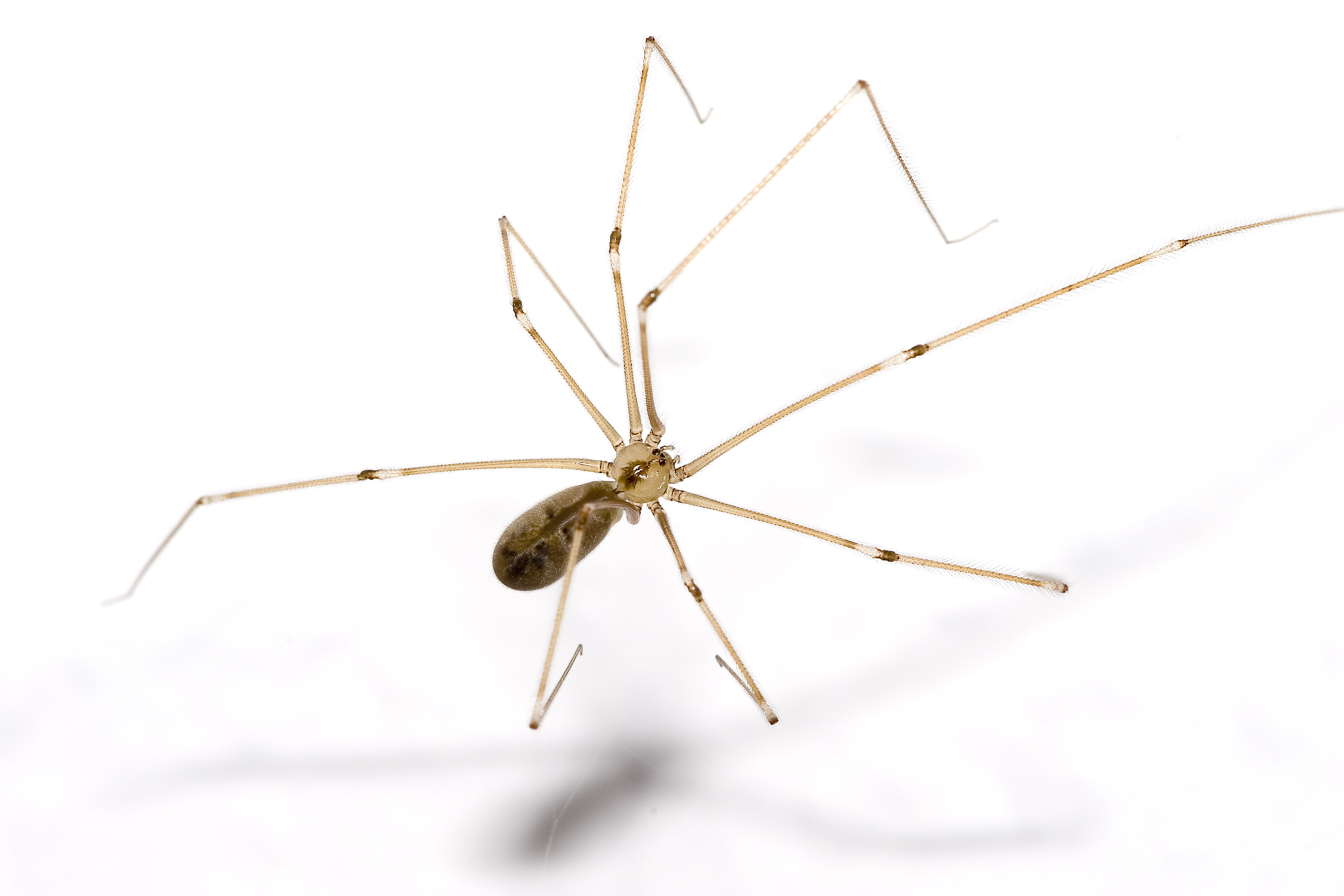
- Pholcus phalangioides
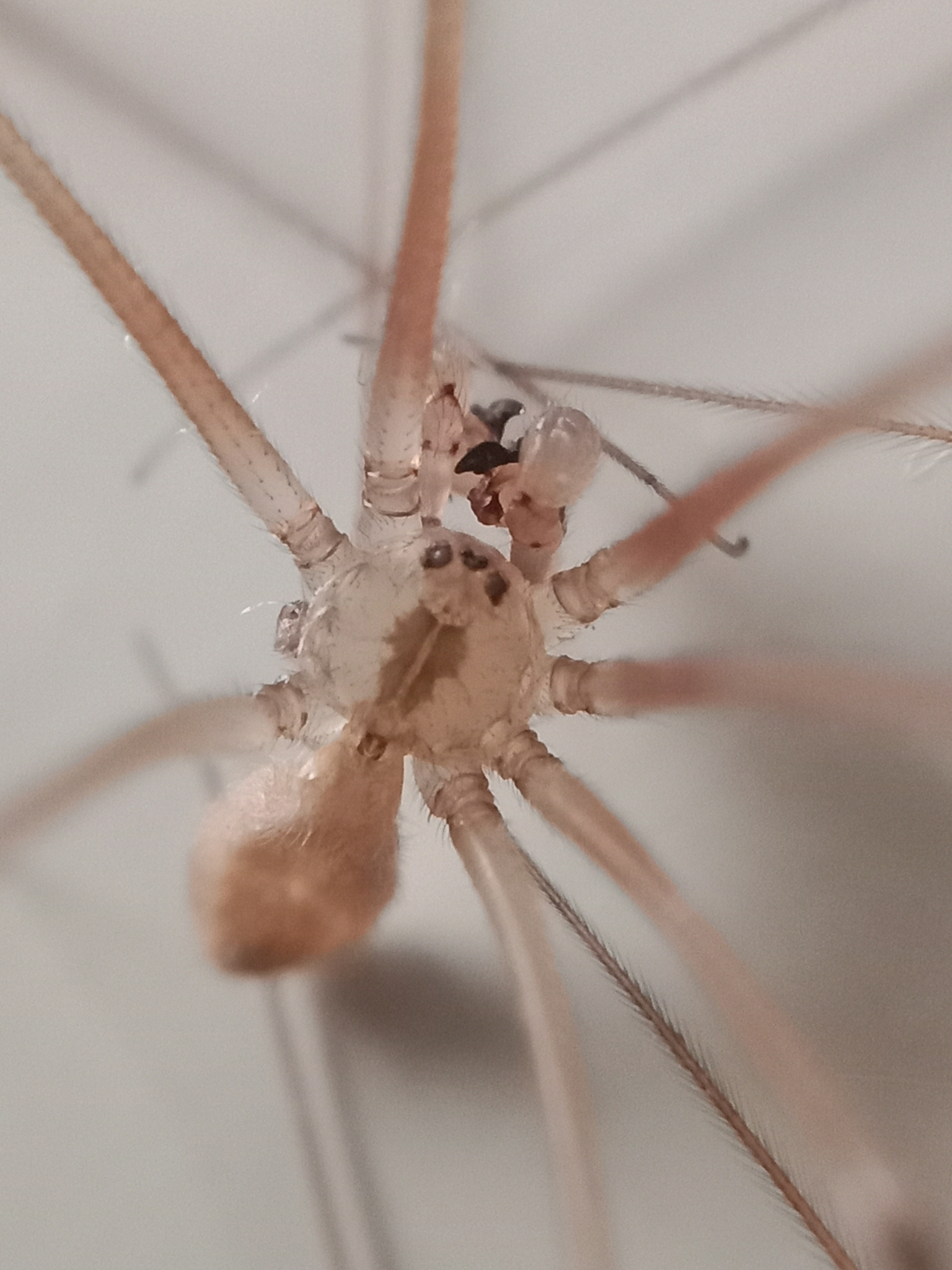
- male Pholcus ponticus

Scientific classification
- Kingdom: Animalia
- Phylum: Arthropoda
- Subphylum: Chelicerata
- Class: Arachnida
- Order: Araneae
- Infraorder: Araneomorphae
- Family: Pholcidae
- Genus: Pholcus; Walckenaer, 1805

Species
- P. nagasakiensis P. okinawaensis P. phalangioides P. opilionides many more

Diversity
- 432 species

= Pholcus =

Genus of spiders

Pholcus is a large genus of long-bodied cellar spiders and allies that belongs to the family Pholcidae.

It includes the cellar spider P. phalangioides, often called the "daddy longlegs". This may cause confusion because the name "daddy longlegs" is also applied to two other unrelated arthropods: the harvestman and the crane fly.

== Description ==
Pholcus, like Pholcidae in general, have extremely long and thin legs. The genus can be distinguished from other pholcid genera by its large size (body length >4 mm), eight eyes, evenly domed prosoma (lacking a median furrow or pit) and cylindrical opisthosoma (longer than it is high).

== Habitat ==
In the wild, Pholcus live in environments such as caves, under rocks, forest shrubs and deep limestone cracks. Synanthropic species such as P. phalangioides live in and around buildings and other disturbed habitats.

== Species ==
As of October 2025, this genus includes 432 species.

These species have pages on Wikipedia:

- Pholcus abstrusus Yao & Li, 2012 – China
- Pholcus alticeps Spassky, 1932 – Germany to Ukraine, Russia (Europe to West Siberia), Caucasus, Iran, Tadjikistan
- Pholcus ancoralis L. Koch, 1865 – Ryukyu Is. to Hawaii, New Caledonia, French Polynesia
- Pholcus crypticolens Bösenberg & Strand, 1906 – Japan
- Pholcus fragillimus Strand, 1907 – Sri Lanka, India to Japan
- Pholcus kwanaksanensis Namkung & Kim, 1990 – Korea
- Pholcus manueli Gertsch, 1937 – Kazakhstan, Turkmenistan, Russia (Far East), China, Korea, Japan. Introduced to United States
- Pholcus nagasakiensis Strand, 1918 – Japan
- Pholcus opilionoides (Schrank, 1781) – Europe, Caucasus, Egypt. Introduced to Canada, United States
- Pholcus persicus Senglet, 1974 – Iran
- Pholcus phalangioides (Fuesslin, 1775) – Western Asia. Introduced to both Americas, Europe, Africa, Asia, Australia, New Zealand and numerous islands (type species)
- Pholcus ponticus Thorell, 1875 – Romania, Bulgaria to China
- Pholcus velitchkovskyi Kulczyński, 1913 – Ukraine, Russia (Europe, Central Asia), Iran

Complete species list as of October 2025
- Pholcus aba J. L. Li, S. Q. Li & Yao, 2025 – China
- Pholcus abstrusus Yao & Li, 2012 – China
- Pholcus acutulus Paik, 1978 – Korea
- Pholcus aduncus Yao & Li, 2012 – China
- Pholcus afghanus Senglet, 2008 – Afghanistan
- Pholcus agilis Yao & Li, 2012 – China
- Pholcus alagarkoil (Huber, 2011) – India
- Pholcus alloctospilus Zhu & Gong, 1991 – China
- Pholcus alpinus Yao & Li, 2012 – China
- Pholcus alticeps Spassky, 1932 – Germany to Ukraine, Russia (Europe to West Siberia), Caucasus, Iran, Tadjikistan
- Pholcus amani Huber, 2011 – Tanzania
- Pholcus anachoreta Dimitrov & Ribera, 2006 – Canary Islands
- Pholcus ancoralis L. Koch, 1865 – Ryukyu Is. to Hawaii, New Caledonia, French Polynesia
- Pholcus ankang Yang, He & Yao, 2024 – China
- Pholcus anlong Chen, Zhang & Zhu, 2011 – China
- Pholcus arayat Huber, 2011 – Philippines
- Pholcus arcuatilis Yao & Li, 2013 – Laos
- Pholcus arkit Huber, 2011 – Central Asia
- Pholcus armeniacus Senglet, 1974 – Iran
- Pholcus arsacius Senglet, 2008 – Iran
- Pholcus attuleh Huber, 2011 – Cameroon
- Pholcus auricularis B. S. Zhang, F. Zhang & Liu, 2016 – China
- Pholcus babao Tong & Li, 2010 – China
- Pholcus baegamsan Jang, Yoo, Lee and Kim, 2026 – South Korea
- Pholcus baguio Huber, 2016 – Philippines
- Pholcus bailongensis Yao & Li, 2012 – China
- Pholcus bajia Lu, Yao & He, 2022 – China
- Pholcus baka Huber, 2011 – West, Central Africa
- Pholcus bakweri Huber, 2011 – Cameroon, Equatorial Guinea (Bioko)
- Pholcus baldiosensis Wunderlich, 1992 – Canary Islands
- Pholcus bamboutos Huber, 2011 – Cameroon
- Pholcus bangfai Huber, 2011 – Laos, Vietnam
- Pholcus bantouensis Yao & Li, 2012 – China
- Pholcus baoji Yang, He & Yao, 2024 – China
- Pholcus bat Lan & Li, 2021 – China
- Pholcus batepa Huber, 2011 – São Tomé and Príncipe
- Pholcus beijingensis Zhu & Song, 1999 – China
- Pholcus berlandi Millot, 1941 – Senegal
- Pholcus bernhardi Sherwood & Krammer, 2025 – Malaysia (peninsula), Indonesia (Sumatra, Java)
- Pholcus bessus Zhu & Gong, 1991 – China
- Pholcus bicornutus Simon, 1892 – Philippines
- Pholcus bidentatus Zhu, J. X. Zhang, Z. S. Zhang & Chen, 2005 – China, Laos
- Pholcus bifidus Yao, Pham & Li, 2015 – Vietnam
- Pholcus bikilai Huber, 2011 – Ethiopia
- Pholcus bimbache Dimitrov & Ribera, 2006 – Canary Islands
- Pholcus bing Yao & Li, 2012 – China
- Pholcus bolikhamsai Huber, 2011 – Laos
- Pholcus bourgini Millot, 1941 – Guinea
- Pholcus brevis Yao & Li, 2012 – China
- Pholcus bulacanensis Yao & Li, 2017 – Philippines (Luzon)
- Pholcus caecus Yao, Pham & Li, 2015 – Vietnam
- Pholcus calcar Wunderlich, 1987 – Canary Islands
- Pholcus calligaster Thorell, 1895 – Nepal, Myanmar
- Pholcus camba Huber, 2011 – Indonesia (Sulawesi)
- Pholcus caspius Senglet, 2008 – Iran
- Pholcus ceheng Chen, Zhang & Zhu, 2011 – China
- Pholcus cenranaensis Yao & Li, 2016 – Indonesia (Sulawesi)
- Pholcus ceylonicus O. Pickard-Cambridge, 1869 – Sri Lanka, possibly Malaysia
- Pholcus chang Yao & Li, 2012 – China
- Pholcus changchi Yao, Li & Lu, 2022 – China
- Pholcus changli Yao, 2024 – China
- Pholcus chaoyang S. Li & Yao, 2025 – China
- Pholcus chappuisi Fage, 1936 – Kenya
- Pholcus chattoni Millot, 1941 – Guinea, Ivory Coast
- Pholcus cheaha Huber, 2011 – United States
- Pholcus chengde Yao, Li & Lu, 2022 – China
- Pholcus cheongogensis Kim & Ye, 2015 – Korea
- Pholcus chevronus Yin, Xu & Bao, 2012 – China
- Pholcus chiakensis Seo, 2014 – Korea
- Pholcus chicheng Tong & Li, 2010 – China
- Pholcus chilgapsanensis J. G. Lee & J. H. Lee, 2021 – Korea
- Pholcus choctaw Huber, 2011 – United States
- Pholcus chugok J. G. Lee & J. H. Lee, 2024 – Korea
- Pholcus chuncheonensis J. G. Lee, Choi & S. K. Kim, 2021 – Korea
- Pholcus circularis Kraus, 1960 – São Tomé and Príncipe
- Pholcus clavatus Schenkel, 1936 – China
- Pholcus clavimaculatus Zhu & Song, 1999 – China
- Pholcus cophenius Senglet, 2008 – Afghanistan
- Pholcus corcho Wunderlich, 1987 – Canary Islands
- Pholcus corniger Dimitrov & Ribera, 2006 – Canary Islands
- Pholcus crassipalpis Spassky, 1937 – Bulgaria, Ukraine, Russia (Europe, Caucasus), Turkey, Kazakhstan
- Pholcus crassus Paik, 1978 – Korea
- Pholcus creticus Senglet, 1971 – Greece (Crete)
- Pholcus crypticolenoides Kim, J. H. Lee & J. G. Lee, 2015 – Korea
- Pholcus crypticolens Bösenberg & Strand, 1906 – Japan
- Pholcus cuneatus Yao & Li, 2012 – China
- Pholcus curvus B. S. Zhang, F. Zhang & Liu, 2016 – China
- Pholcus dade Huber, 2011 – United States
- Pholcus dali Zhang & Zhu, 2009 – China
- Pholcus datan Tong & Li, 2010 – China
- Pholcus datong Yao, Li & Lu, 2022 – China
- Pholcus debilis (Thorell, 1899) – Cameroon, Equatorial Guinea (Bioko)
- Pholcus decorus Yao & Li, 2012 – China
- Pholcus dentatus Wunderlich, 1995 – Madeira
- Pholcus deokjeok Jang, Yoo, Kim & Bae, 2025 – Korea
- Pholcus deunggolensis Kim & Kim, 2016 – Korea
- Pholcus dieban Yao & Li, 2012 – China
- Pholcus difengensis Yao & Li, 2016 – China
- Pholcus dixie Huber, 2011 – United States
- Pholcus djelalabad Senglet, 2008 – Afghanistan, India
- Pholcus dongxue Yao & Li, 2017 – Thailand
- Pholcus doucki Huber, 2011 – Guinea
- Pholcus duan Yao & Li, 2017 – Thailand
- Pholcus dungara Huber, 2001 – Australia (Queensland)
- Pholcus duryun Jang, Bae, Lee, Yoo & Kim, 2023 – Korea
- Pholcus edentatus Campos & Wunderlich, 1995 – Canary Islands
- Pholcus elymaeus Senglet, 2008 – Iran
- Pholcus exilis Tong & Li, 2010 – China
- Pholcus extumidus Paik, 1978 – Korea, Japan
- Pholcus fagei Kratochvíl, 1940 – Kenya
- Pholcus faveauxi (Lawrence, 1967) – DR Congo
- Pholcus fengcheng Zhang & Zhu, 2009 – China
- Pholcus fengmeii Zhang, He & Yao, 2024 – China
- Pholcus fengning Yao, Li & Lu, 2022 – China
- Pholcus foliaceus Peng & Zhang, 2013 – China
- Pholcus fragillimus Strand, 1907 – Sri Lanka, India to Japan
- Pholcus fuerteventurensis Wunderlich, 1992 – Canary Islands, Morocco
- Pholcus gaizhou Yao & Li, 2021 – China
- Pholcus gajiensis Seo, 2014 – Korea
- Pholcus gangneung Jang, Yoo, Kim & Bae, 2025 – Korea
- Pholcus ganziensis Yao & Li, 2012 – China
- Pholcus gaoi Song & Ren, 1994 – China
- Pholcus genuiformis Wunderlich, 1995 – Algeria
- Pholcus geogeum Lee, Yoo, Jang & Kim, 2025 – Korea
- Pholcus gimsatgat J. G. Lee & J. H. Lee, 2024 – Korea
- Pholcus gochang Lee, Yoo, Jang & Kim, 2025 – Korea
- Pholcus gomerae Wunderlich, 1980 – Canary Islands
- Pholcus gonggarensis Yao & Li, 2016 – China
- Pholcus gosuensis Kim & Lee, 2004 – Korea
- Pholcus gracillimus Thorell, 1890 – Malaysia, Singapore, Indonesia (Sumatra)
- Pholcus guadarfia Dimitrov & Ribera, 2007 – Canary Islands
- Pholcus guangling Yao, Li & Lu, 2022 – China
- Pholcus guani Song & Ren, 1994 – China
- Pholcus guanshui Yao & Li, 2021 – China
- Pholcus gui Zhu & Song, 1999 – China
- Pholcus guineensis Millot, 1941 – Guinea, Sierra Leone
- Pholcus hamaensis Yao & Li, 2016 – China
- Pholcus hamatus Tong & Ji, 2010 – China
- Pholcus hamuchal Yao & Li, 2020 – Pakistan
- Pholcus harveyi Zhang & Zhu, 2009 – China
- Pholcus hebei S. Li & Yao, 2025 – China
- Pholcus helenae Wunderlich, 1987 – Canary Islands
- Pholcus henanensis Zhu & Mao, 1983 – China
- Pholcus hieroglyphicus Pavesi, 1883 – Eritrea
- Pholcus higoensis Irie & Ono, 2008 – Japan
- Pholcus hinsonensis Yao & Li, 2016 – Thailand
- Pholcus hochiminhi Yao, Pham & Li, 2015 – Vietnam
- Pholcus hongcheon Jang, Yoo, Lee and Kim, 2026 – South Korea
- Pholcus hongseong Lee, Yoo, Jang & Kim, 2025 – Korea
- Pholcus hoyo Huber, 2011 – DR Congo
- Pholcus huailai Yao, Li & Lu, 2022 – China
- Pholcus huapingensis Yao & Li, 2012 – China
- Pholcus huberi Zhang & Zhu, 2009 – China
- Pholcus huludao S. Li & Yao, 2025 – China
- Pholcus hunyuan Yao, Li & Lu, 2022 – China
- Pholcus huoxiaerensis Yao & Li, 2016 – China
- Pholcus hwaam Jang, Bae, Lee, Yoo & Kim, 2023 – Korea
- Pholcus hwangjeong J. G. Lee & J. H. Lee, 2024 – Korea
- Pholcus hyrcanus Senglet, 1974 – Iran
- Pholcus hystaspus Senglet, 2008 – Iran
- Pholcus imbricatus Yao & Li, 2012 – China
- Pholcus incheonensis J. G. Lee & J. H. Lee, 2021 – Korea
- Pholcus intricatus Dimitrov & Ribera, 2003 – Canary Islands
- Pholcus jaegeri Huber, 2011 – Laos
- Pholcus jeocheon Lee, Yoo, Jang & Kim, 2025 – Korea
- Pholcus jiaocheng Zhao, Li & Yao, 2023 – China
- Pholcus jiaotu Yao & Li, 2012 – China
- Pholcus jiaozuo Yang & Yao, 2024 – China
- Pholcus jiguanshan Yao & Li, 2021 – China
- Pholcus jindongensis Seo, 2018 – Korea
- Pholcus jingnan Yao & Li, 2020 – China
- Pholcus jingyangensis Yao & Li, 2016 – China
- Pholcus jinniu Tong & Li, 2010 – China
- Pholcus jinwum Huber, 2001 – Australia (Queensland)
- Pholcus jinzhou S. Li & Yao, 2025 – China
- Pholcus jiulong Tong & Li, 2010 – China
- Pholcus jiuwei Tong & Ji, 2010 – China
- Pholcus jixianensis Zhu & Yu, 1983 – China
- Pholcus joreongensis Seo, 2004 – Korea
- Pholcus jusahi Huber, 2011 – United States
- Pholcus juwangensis Seo, 2014 – Korea
- Pholcus kaebyaiensis Yao & Li, 2016 – Thailand
- Pholcus kakum Huber, 2009 – Ghana, Ivory Coast, Guinea, Congo
- Pholcus kalam Yao & Li, 2020 – Pakistan
- Pholcus kamkaly Huber, 2011 – Kazakhstan
- Pholcus kandahar Senglet, 2008 – Afghanistan
- Pholcus kangding Zhang & Zhu, 2009 – China
- Pholcus kapuri Tikader, 1977 – India (Andaman Is.)
- Pholcus karawari Huber, 2011 – New Guinea
- Pholcus kawit Huber, 2016 – Philippines
- Pholcus kihansi Huber, 2011 – Tanzania
- Pholcus kimi Song & Zhu, 1994 – China, Laos
- Pholcus kindia Huber, 2011 – Guinea
- Pholcus kingi Huber, 2011 – United States
- Pholcus knoeseli Wunderlich, 1992 – Canary Islands
- Pholcus koah Huber, 2001 – Australia (Queensland)
- Pholcus koasati Huber, 2011 – United States
- Pholcus krachensis Yao & Li, 2016 – Thailand
- Pholcus kribi Huber, 2011 – Cameroon
- Pholcus kuaile Yao, Li & Lu, 2022 – China
- Pholcus kui Yao & Li, 2012 – China
- Pholcus kunming Zhang & Zhu, 2009 – China
- Pholcus kwamgumi Huber, 2011 – Kenya, Tanzania
- Pholcus kwanaksanensis Namkung & Kim, 1990 – Korea
- Pholcus kwangkyosanensis Kim & Park, 2009 – Korea
- Pholcus kyondo Huber, 2011 – Congo
- Pholcus laksao Huber, 2011 – Laos
- Pholcus lamperti Strand, 1907 – Tanzania
- Pholcus langensis Yao & Li, 2016 – China
- Pholcus lanieri Huber, 2011 – United States
- Pholcus leruthi Lessert, 1935 – Congo, East Africa
- Pholcus lexuancanhi Yao, Pham & Li, 2012 – China
- Pholcus liaoning S. Li & Yao, 2025 – China
- Pholcus lijiangensis Yao & Li, 2012 – China
- Pholcus lilangai Huber, 2011 – Tanzania
- Pholcus linfen Zhao, Li & Yao, 2023 – China
- Pholcus lingguanensis Yao & Li, 2016 – China
- Pholcus lingulatus Y. Q. Gao, J. C. Gao & Zhu, 2002 – China
- Pholcus linzhou F. Zhang & J. X. Zhang, 2000 – China
- Pholcus lishi Zhao, Li & Yao, 2023 – China
- Pholcus liui Yao & Li, 2012 – China
- Pholcus liutu Yao & Li, 2012 – China
- Pholcus longlin Yao & Li, 2020 – China
- Pholcus longus Yao & Li, 2016 – China
- Pholcus longxigu Yao & Li, 2021 – China
- Pholcus lualaba Huber, 2011 – Congo
- Pholcus luanping Yao, Li & Lu, 2022 – China
- Pholcus luding Tong & Li, 2010 – China
- Pholcus luki Huber, 2011 – Congo
- Pholcus luliang Zhao, Li & Yao, 2023 – China
- Pholcus luonan Yang & Yao, 2024 – China
- Pholcus luoquanbei Yao & Li, 2021 – China
- Pholcus luoyang Yang & Yao, 2024 – China
- Pholcus lupanga Huber, 2011 – Tanzania
- Pholcus lushan Yang & Yao, 2024 – China
- Pholcus luya Peng & Zhang, 2013 – China
- Pholcus madeirensis Wunderlich, 1987 – Madeira
- Pholcus maepo J. G. Lee & J. H. Lee, 2024 – Korea
- Pholcus magnus Wunderlich, 1987 – Madeira
- Pholcus malpaisensis Wunderlich, 1992 – Canary Islands
- Pholcus manueli Gertsch, 1937 – Kazakhstan, Turkmenistan, Russia (Far East), China, Korea, Japan. Introduced to United States
- Pholcus mao Yao & Li, 2012 – China
- Pholcus maronita Brignoli, 1977 – Lebanon
- Pholcus mascaensis Wunderlich, 1987 – Canary Islands
- Pholcus maxian Lu, Yang & He, 2021 – China
- Pholcus mazumbai Huber, 2011 – Tanzania
- Pholcus mbuti Huber, 2011 – Congo
- Pholcus mecheria Huber, 2011 – Algeria
- Pholcus medicus Senglet, 1974 – Iran
- Pholcus medog Zhang, Zhu & Song, 2006 – China, India
- Pholcus mengding J. L. Li, S. Q. Li & Yao, 2025 – China
- Pholcus mengla Song & Zhu, 1999 – China
- Pholcus mentawir Huber, 2011 – Indonesia (Borneo)
- Pholcus metta Huber, 2019 – Sri Lanka
- Pholcus mianshanensis Zhang & Zhu, 2009 – China
- Pholcus mino J. G. Lee & J. H. Lee, 2024 – Korea
- Pholcus mirabilis Yao & Li, 2012 – China
- Pholcus mixiaoqii Xu, Zhang & Yao, 2019 – China
- Pholcus miyi J. L. Li, S. Q. Li & Yao, 2025 – China
- Pholcus moca Huber, 2011 – Cameroon, Equatorial Guinea (Bioko), Gabon
- Pholcus mohang Jang, Bae, Lee, Yoo & Kim, 2023 – Korea
- Pholcus montanus Paik, 1978 – Korea
- Pholcus muju Jang, Bae & Kim, 2025 – Korea
- Pholcus multidentatus Wunderlich, 1987 – Canary Islands
- Pholcus mulu Huber, 2016 – Philippines
- Pholcus muralicola Maughan & Fitch, 1976 – United States
- Pholcus musensis Yao & Li, 2016 – Thailand
- Pholcus nagasakiensis Strand, 1918 – Japan
- Pholcus namhae Jang, Yoo, Lee and Kim, 2026 – South Korea
- Pholcus namkhan Huber, 2011 – Laos
- Pholcus negara Huber, 2011 – Bali
- Pholcus nenjukovi Spassky, 1936 – Central Asia
- Pholcus ningan Yao & Li, 2018 – China
- Pholcus nkoetye Huber, 2011 – Cameroon
- Pholcus nodong Huber, 2011 – Korea
- Pholcus noeun J. G. Lee & J. H. Lee, 2024 – Korea
- Pholcus obscurus Yao & Li, 2012 – China
- Pholcus oculosus F. Zhang & J. X. Zhang, 2000 – China
- Pholcus okgye Huber, 2011 – Korea
- Pholcus olangapo Huber, 2016 – Philippines
- Pholcus opilionoides (Schrank, 1781) – Europe, Caucasus, Egypt. Introduced to Canada, United States
- Pholcus ornatus Bösenberg, 1895 – Canary Islands
- Pholcus osaek Jang, Yoo & Kim, 2025 – Korea
- Pholcus otomi Huber, 2011 – Japan
- Pholcus ovatus Yao & Li, 2012 – China
- Pholcus pagbilao Huber, 2011 – Philippines
- Pholcus pajuensis J. G. Lee, Choi & S. K. Kim, 2021 – Korea
- Pholcus palgongensis Seo, 2014 – Korea
- Pholcus papilionis Peng & Zhang, 2011 – China
- Pholcus papillatus B. S. Zhang, F. Zhang & Liu, 2016 – China
- Pholcus paralinzhou Zhang & Zhu, 2009 – China
- Pholcus parayichengicus Zhang & Zhu, 2009 – China
- Pholcus parkyeonensis Kim & Yoo, 2009 – Korea
- Pholcus parthicus Senglet, 2008 – Iran
- Pholcus parvus Wunderlich, 1987 – Madeira
- Pholcus pennatus Zhang, Zhu & Song, 2005 – China
- Pholcus persicus Senglet, 1974 – Iran
- Pholcus phalangioides (Fuesslin, 1775) – Western Asia. Introduced to both Americas, Europe, Africa, Asia, Australia, New Zealand and numerous islands (type species)
- Pholcus phnombak Lan, Jäger & Li, 2021 – Cambodia
- Pholcus phoenixus Zhang & Zhu, 2009 – China
- Pholcus phungiformes Oliger, 1983 – Russia (Far East)
- Pholcus piagolensis Seo, 2018 – Korea
- Pholcus ping Yao & Li, 2017 – Vietnam
- Pholcus pocheonensis J. G. Lee, Choi & S. K. Kim, 2021 – Korea
- Pholcus pojeonensis Kim & Yoo, 2008 – Korea
- Pholcus ponticus Thorell, 1875 – Romania, Bulgaria to China
- Pholcus punu Huber, 2014 – Gabon
- Pholcus puranappui Huber, 2019 – Sri Lanka
- Pholcus pyeongchangensis Seo, 2018 – Korea
- Pholcus qiaojia J. L. Li, S. Q. Li & Yao, 2025 – China
- Pholcus qin S. Li & Yao, 2025 – China
- Pholcus qingchengensis Y. Q. Gao, J. C. Gao & Zhu, 2002 – China
- Pholcus qinghaiensis Song & Zhu, 1999 – China
- Pholcus qingyunensis Yao & Li, 2016 – China
- Pholcus rawiriae Huber, 2014 – Gabon
- Pholcus reevesi Huber, 2011 – United States
- Pholcus roquensis Wunderlich, 1992 – Canary Islands
- Pholcus ruteng Huber, 2011 – Indonesia (Flores)
- Pholcus saaristoi Zhang & Zhu, 2009 – China
- Pholcus saidovi Yao & Li, 2017 – Tajikistan
- Pholcus sakaew Yao & Li, 2018 – Thailand
- Pholcus schawalleri Yao, Li & Jäger, 2014 – Philippines
- Pholcus seokmodoensis J. G. Lee & J. H. Lee, 2021 – Korea
- Pholcus seorakensis Seo, 2018 – Korea
- Pholcus seoulensis J. G. Lee & J. H. Lee, 2021 – Korea
- Pholcus shangluo Yang & Yao, 2024 – China
- Pholcus shangrila Zhang & Zhu, 2009 – China
- Pholcus shenshi Yao & Li, 2021 – China
- Pholcus shuangtu Yao & Li, 2012 – China
- Pholcus shuguanensis Yao & Li, 2017 – Tajikistan
- Pholcus sidorenkoi Dunin, 1994 – Russia (Europe, Central Asia), Tajikistan
- Pholcus silvai Wunderlich, 1995 – Madeira
- Pholcus simbok Huber, 2011 – Korea
- Pholcus socheunensis Paik, 1978 – Korea
- Pholcus sogdianae Brignoli, 1978 – Russia (Caucasus, South Siberia), Kazakhstan, Central Asia
- Pholcus sokkrisanensis Paik, 1978 – Korea
- Pholcus solchi J. G. Lee & J. H. Lee, 2024 – Korea
- Pholcus songi Zhang & Zhu, 2009 – China
- Pholcus songkhonensis Yao & Li, 2016 – Thailand
- Pholcus songxian Zhang & Zhu, 2009 – China
- Pholcus soukous Huber, 2011 – Congo
- Pholcus spasskyi Brignoli, 1978 – Turkey
- Pholcus spiliensis Wunderlich, 1995 – Greece (Crete)
- Pholcus spilis Zhu & Gong, 1991 – China
- Pholcus steineri Huber, 2011 – Laos
- Pholcus strandi Caporiacco, 1941 – Ethiopia
- Pholcus sublaksao Yao & Li, 2013 – Laos
- Pholcus sublingulatus Zhang & Zhu, 2009 – China
- Pholcus suboculosus Peng & Zhang, 2011 – China
- Pholcus subwuyiensis Zhang & Zhu, 2009 – China
- Pholcus suizhongicus Zhu & Song, 1999 – China
- Pholcus sumatraensis Wunderlich, 1995 – Indonesia (Sumatra)
- Pholcus suraksanensis J. G. Lee & J. H. Lee, 2021 – Korea
- Pholcus sveni Wunderlich, 1987 – Canary Islands
- Pholcus taarab Huber, 2011 – Tanzania, Malawi
- Pholcus taibaiensis Wang & Zhu, 1992 – China
- Pholcus taibeli Caporiacco, 1949 – Ethiopia
- Pholcus taishan Song & Zhu, 1999 – China
- Pholcus taita Huber, 2011 – Kenya
- Pholcus tang Yao, Li & Lu, 2022 – China
- Pholcus tangyuensis Yao & Li, 2016 – China
- Pholcus tenerifensis Wunderlich, 1987 – Canary Islands
- Pholcus thakek Huber, 2011 – Laos
- Pholcus tianmenshan Yao & Li, 2021 – China
- Pholcus tianmuensis Yao & Li, 2016 – China
- Pholcus tongi Yao & Li, 2012 – China
- Pholcus tongyaoi Wang & Yao, 2020 – China
- Pholcus triangulatus F. Zhang & J. X. Zhang, 2000 – China
- Pholcus tuoyuan Yao & Li, 2012 – China
- Pholcus turcicus Wunderlich, 1980 – Turkey
- Pholcus tuyan Yao & Li, 2012 – China
- Pholcus twa Huber, 2011 – East Africa
- Pholcus uiseongensis Seo, 2018 – Korea
- Pholcus uksuensis Kim & Ye, 2014 – Korea
- Pholcus umphang Yao & Li, 2018 – Thailand
- Pholcus unaksanensis J. G. Lee, Choi & S. K. Kim, 2021 – Korea
- Pholcus undatus Yao & Li, 2012 – China
- Pholcus ungyo J. G. Lee & J. H. Lee, 2024 – Korea
- Pholcus uva Huber, 2019 – Sri Lanka
- Pholcus varirata Huber, 2011 – New Guinea
- Pholcus vatovae Caporiacco, 1940 – Ethiopia
- Pholcus velitchkovskyi Kulczyński, 1913 – Ukraine, Russia (Europe, Central Asia), Iran
- Pholcus vietnamensis Yao & Li, 2017 – Vietnam
- Pholcus viveki Sen, Dhali, Saha & Raychaudhuri, 2015 – India
- Pholcus wahehe Huber, 2011 – Tanzania
- Pholcus wangi Yao & Li, 2012 – China
- Pholcus wangjiang Yao & Li, 2021 – China
- Pholcus wangtian Tong & Ji, 2010 – China
- Pholcus wangxidong Zhang & Zhu, 2009 – China
- Pholcus weinan Yang & Yao, 2024 – China
- Pholcus wenchuan J. L. Li, S. Q. Li & Yao, 2025 – China
- Pholcus wenshui Zhao, Li & Yao, 2023 – China
- Pholcus wonju J. G. Lee & J. H. Lee, 2024 – Korea
- Pholcus woongil Huber, 2011 – Korea
- Pholcus worak Jang, Bae, Lee, Yoo & Kim, 2023 – Korea
- Pholcus wuling Tong & Li, 2010 – China
- Pholcus wuyiensis Zhu & Gong, 1991 – China
- Pholcus xiangfen Zhao, Li & Yao, 2023 – China
- Pholcus xianrendong Liu & Tong, 2015 – China
- Pholcus xiaotu Yao & Li, 2012 – China
- Pholcus xinglong Yao, Li & Lu, 2022 – China
- Pholcus xingqi Yao & Li, 2021 – China
- Pholcus xingren Chen, Zhang & Zhu, 2011 – China
- Pholcus xingyi Chen, Zhang & Zhu, 2011 – China
- Pholcus xinzhou Yao, Li & Lu, 2022 – China
- Pholcus xiuyan Zhao, Zheng & Yao, 2023 – China
- Pholcus xuanzhong Zhao, Li & Yao, 2023 – China
- Pholcus yaan J. L. Li, S. Q. Li & Yao, 2025 – China
- Pholcus yangi Zhang & Zhu, 2009 – China
- Pholcus yangpyeong Jang, Bae, Lee, Yoo & Kim, 2023 – Korea
- Pholcus yanjinensis Yao & Li, 2016 – China
- Pholcus yanqing Yao, Li & Lu, 2022 – China
- Pholcus yaoshan Yao & Li, 2021 – China
- Pholcus yeongcheon Jang, Yoo, Lee and Kim, 2026 – South Korea
- Pholcus yeoncheonensis Kim, J. H. Lee & J. G. Lee, 2015 – Korea
- Pholcus yeongheung Jang, Bae & Kim, 2025 – Korea
- Pholcus yeongwol Huber, 2011 – Korea
- Pholcus yi Yao & Li, 2012 – China
- Pholcus yichengicus Zhu, Tu & Shi, 1986 – China
- Pholcus yongin Lee, Yoo, Jang & Kim, 2025 – Korea
- Pholcus yongshun Yao & Li, 2018 – China
- Pholcus yoshikurai Irie, 1997 – Japan
- Pholcus yuantu Yao & Li, 2012 – China
- Pholcus yugong Zhang & Zhu, 2009 – China
- Pholcus yuhuangshan Yao & Li, 2021 – China
- Pholcus yuncheng Yang & Yao, 2024 – China
- Pholcus yunnanensis Yao & Li, 2012 – China
- Pholcus yuxi Yao & Li, 2018 – China
- Pholcus zham Zhang, Zhu & Song, 2006 – Nepal, China
- Pholcus zhangae Zhang & Zhu, 2009 – China
- Pholcus zhaoi Yao, Pham & Li, 2015 – Vietnam
- Pholcus zhongdongensis Yao & Li, 2016 – China
- Pholcus zhongyang Zhao, Li & Yao, 2023 – China
- Pholcus zhui Yao & Li, 2012 – China
- Pholcus zhuolu Zhang & Zhu, 2009 – China
- Pholcus zichyi Kulczyński, 1901 – Russia (Far East), China, Korea

== Identification resources ==
- Pholcus of Europe: https://araneae.nmbe.ch/specieskey/263/Pholcus
- Pholcus of North America: https://bugguide.net/node/view/9609
