= Aetana fiji =

Scientific classification
- Kingdom: Animalia
- Phylum: Arthropoda
- Subphylum: Chelicerata
- Class: Arachnida
- Order: Araneae
- Infraorder: Araneomorphae
- Family: Pholcidae
- Genus: Aetana
- Species: A. fiji

Binomial name
- Aetana fiji Huber, 2005

Species of spider

Aetana fiji is a species of Araneomorph spider in the family Pholcidae.

== Distribution ==
This species is found in Viti Levu, Fiji.

== Description ==
The male holotype measures 3.2 mm.
