= Aetana =

Scientific classification
- Domain: Eukaryota
- Kingdom: Animalia
- Phylum: Arthropoda
- Subphylum: Chelicerata
- Class: Arachnida
- Order: Araneae
- Infraorder: Araneomorphae
- Family: Pholcidae
- Genus: Aetana; Huber

Species
- see text

Diversity
- 21 species

Genus of spiders

Aetana is a genus of spiders in the family Pholcidae. It was first described in 2005 by Huber. As of May 2019, it contains 21 species, all from the Philippines and Southeast Asia.

== Species ==
Aetana comprises the following species:

- Aetana abadae Huber, 2015
- Aetana baganihan Huber, 2015
- Aetana banahaw Huber, 2015
- Aetana fiji Huber, 2005
- Aetana gaya Huber, 2015
- Aetana indah Huber, 2015
- Aetana kinabalu Huber, 2005
- Aetana kiukoki Huber, 2015
- Aetana lambir Huber, 2015
- Aetana libjo Huber, 2015
- Aetana loboc Huber, 2015
- Aetana lozadae Huber, 2015
- Aetana manansalai Huber, 2015
- Aetana mokwam Huber, 2019
- Aetana ocampoi Huber, 2015
- Aetana omayan Huber, 2005
- Aetana ondawamei Huber, 2019
- Aetana paragua Huber, 2015
- Aetana pasambai Huber, 2015
- Aetana poring Huber, 2015
- Aetana ternate Huber, 2019
