= Aetana omayan =

Scientific classification
- Kingdom: Animalia
- Phylum: Arthropoda
- Subphylum: Chelicerata
- Class: Arachnida
- Order: Araneae
- Infraorder: Araneomorphae
- Family: Pholcidae
- Genus: Aetana
- Species: A. omayan

Binomial name
- Aetana omayan Huber, 2005

Species of spider

Aetana omayan is a species of Araneomorph spider in the family Pholcidae.

== Distribution ==
This species is found in the Philippines.

== Description ==
The male holotype measures 4.25 mm (4.5 mm with clypeus).
