= Aetana kinabalu =

Scientific classification
- Kingdom: Animalia
- Phylum: Arthropoda
- Subphylum: Chelicerata
- Class: Arachnida
- Order: Araneae
- Infraorder: Araneomorphae
- Family: Pholcidae
- Genus: Aetana
- Species: A. kinabalu

Binomial name
- Aetana kinabalu Huber, 2005

Species of spider

Aetana kinabalu is a species of Araneomorph spider in the family Pholcidae.

== Distribution ==
This species is found in Sabah, Malaysia.

== Description ==
The male holotype measures 3.0 mm.
