= Aetana abadae =

Scientific classification
- Kingdom: Animalia
- Phylum: Arthropoda
- Subphylum: Chelicerata
- Class: Arachnida
- Order: Araneae
- Infraorder: Araneomorphae
- Family: Pholcidae
- Genus: Aetana
- Species: A. abadae

Binomial name
- Aetana abadae Huber, 2015

Species of spider

Aetana abadae is a species of Araneomorph spider in the family Pholcidae.

== Distribution ==
This species is found in the Philippines.
