= Stenosfemuraia =

Scientific classification
- Kingdom: Animalia
- Phylum: Arthropoda
- Subphylum: Chelicerata
- Class: Arachnida
- Order: Araneae
- Infraorder: Araneomorphae
- Family: Pholcidae
- Genus: Stenosfemuraia; González-Sponga, 1998

Type species
- S. parva González-Sponga, 1998

Species
- S. cuadrata González-Sponga, 2005 – Venezuela; S. parva González-Sponga, 1998 – Venezuela; S. pilosa (González-Sponga, 2005) – Venezuela

Synonyms
- Chichiriviche González-Sponga, 2011; Codazziella González-Sponga, 2005

Genus of spiders

Stenosfemuraia is a genus of Venezuelan cellar spiders that was first described by M. A. González-Sponga in 1998. As of June 2019 it contains only three species, found only in Venezuela: S. cuadrata, S. parva, and S. pilosa.

== See also ==
- List of Pholcidae species
