= Stenosfemuraia pilosa =

Scientific classification
- Domain: Eukaryota
- Kingdom: Animalia
- Phylum: Arthropoda
- Subphylum: Chelicerata
- Class: Arachnida
- Order: Araneae
- Infraorder: Araneomorphae
- Family: Pholcidae
- Genus: Stenosfemuraia
- Species: S. pilosa

Binomial name
- Stenosfemuraia pilosa (González-Sponga, 2005)

Synonyms
- Codazziella pilosa González-Sponga, 2005; Chichiriviche costanero González-Sponga, 2011

Species of spider

Stenosfemuraia pilosa is a species of spider in the family Pholcidae. It was first described in 2005 by González-Sponga as Codazziella pilosa. In 2017, it was transferred to Stenosfemuraia and Chichiriviche costanero was synonymized with it. The species is endemic to Venezuela.
