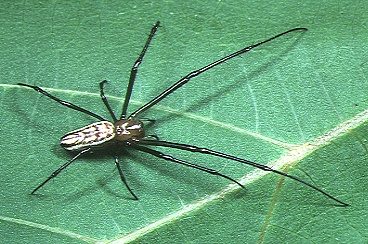

Scientific classification
- Domain: Eukaryota
- Kingdom: Animalia
- Phylum: Arthropoda
- Subphylum: Chelicerata
- Class: Arachnida
- Order: Araneae
- Infraorder: Araneomorphae
- Family: Tetragnathidae
- Genus: Leucauge
- Species: L. celebesiana

Binomial name
- Leucauge celebesiana (Walckenaer, 1842)

Synonyms
- Tetragnatha celebesiana Epeira nigro-trivittata Meta celebesiana Argyroepeira nigrotrivittata Argyroepeira celebesiana Leucauge nigrotrivittata Leucauge retracta Leucauge veterascens Leucauge tuberculata

= Leucauge celebesiana =

Species of spider

Leucauge celebesiana, commonly called the black-striped orchard spider, is a species of spider belonging to the family Tetragnathidae. It is found from India to China, Japan, Sulawesi and New Guinea.

Like many of its congeners, this is a colourful and distinctive spider. It has a body length (excluding legs) of 13 mm (0.51 in). The abdomen is white with yellow-green sides with black stripes separating the white from the coloured flanks. Another black stripe runs right down the middle. This species constructs a web inclined at 45° and several individuals often build these webs close together.

Leucauge subblanda is a similar spider found in Japan.
