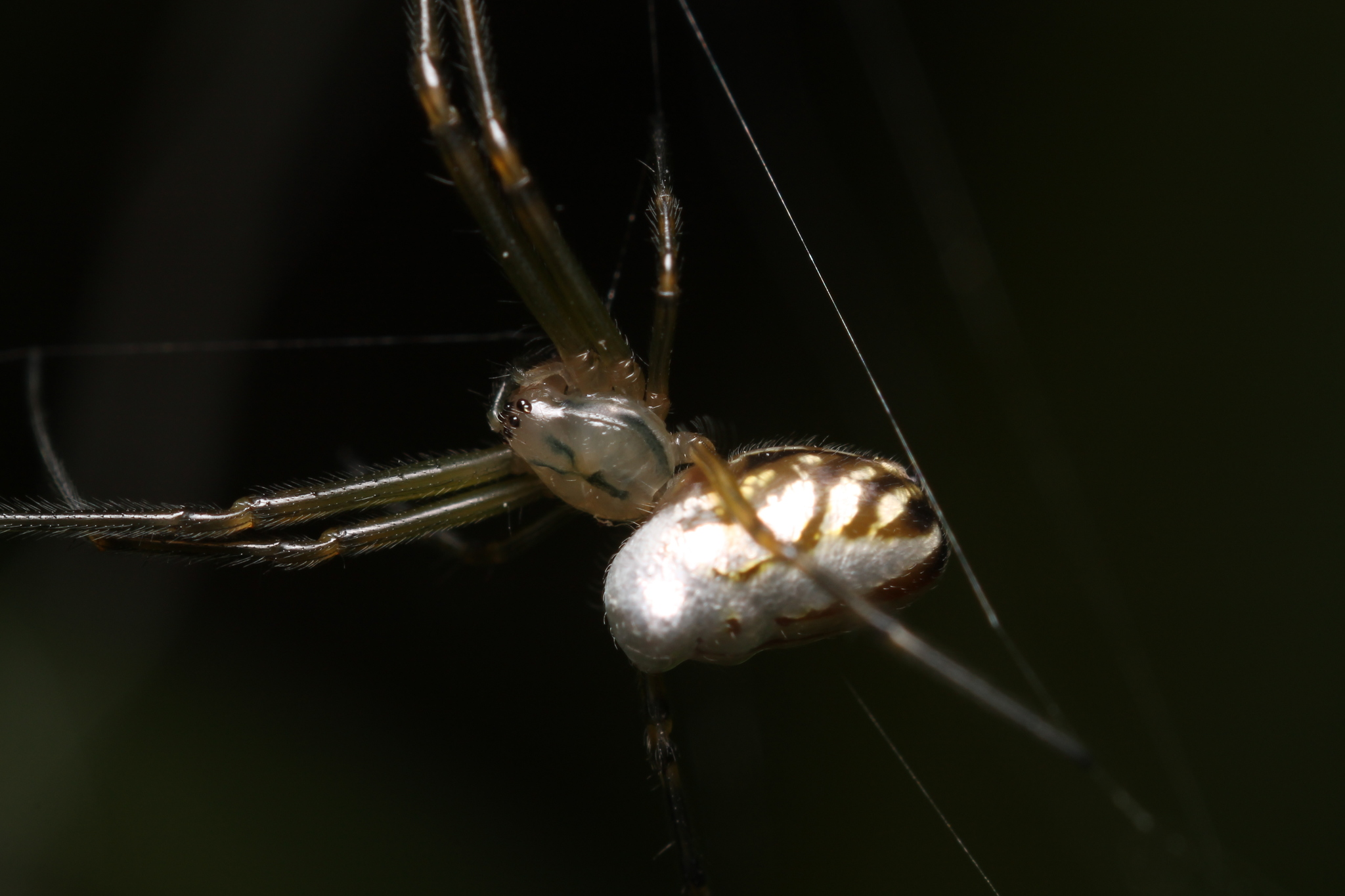

Conservation status
- Not Threatened (NZ TCS)

Scientific classification
- Kingdom: Animalia
- Phylum: Arthropoda
- Subphylum: Chelicerata
- Class: Arachnida
- Order: Araneae
- Infraorder: Araneomorphae
- Family: Tetragnathidae
- Genus: Leucauge
- Species: L. dromedaria

Binomial name
- Leucauge dromedaria (Thorell, 1842)

Synonyms
- Meta granulata; Meta dromedaria; Nephila argentatum

= Leucauge dromedaria =

Humped silver orb spider

Species of spider

Leucauge dromedaria, the humped silver orb spider, is one of the long-jawed orb weaver spiders. A medium to large sized orb weaving spider, with a body length up to 15 mm long (female). Male to 6 mm. This species has a second pair of "humps" on the abdomen. Found in Australia, some south Pacific Islands and New Zealand.

== Taxonomy ==
This species was described as Meta granulata in 1842 by Tamerlan Thorell. It was most recently revised in 1917, in which it was moved to the Leucauge genus.

== Distribution ==
This species is known from New Zealand, Australia and some Pacific Islands.

== Conservation status ==
Under the New Zealand Threat Classification System, this species is listed as "Not Threatened" with the qualifier of "Secure Overseas".
