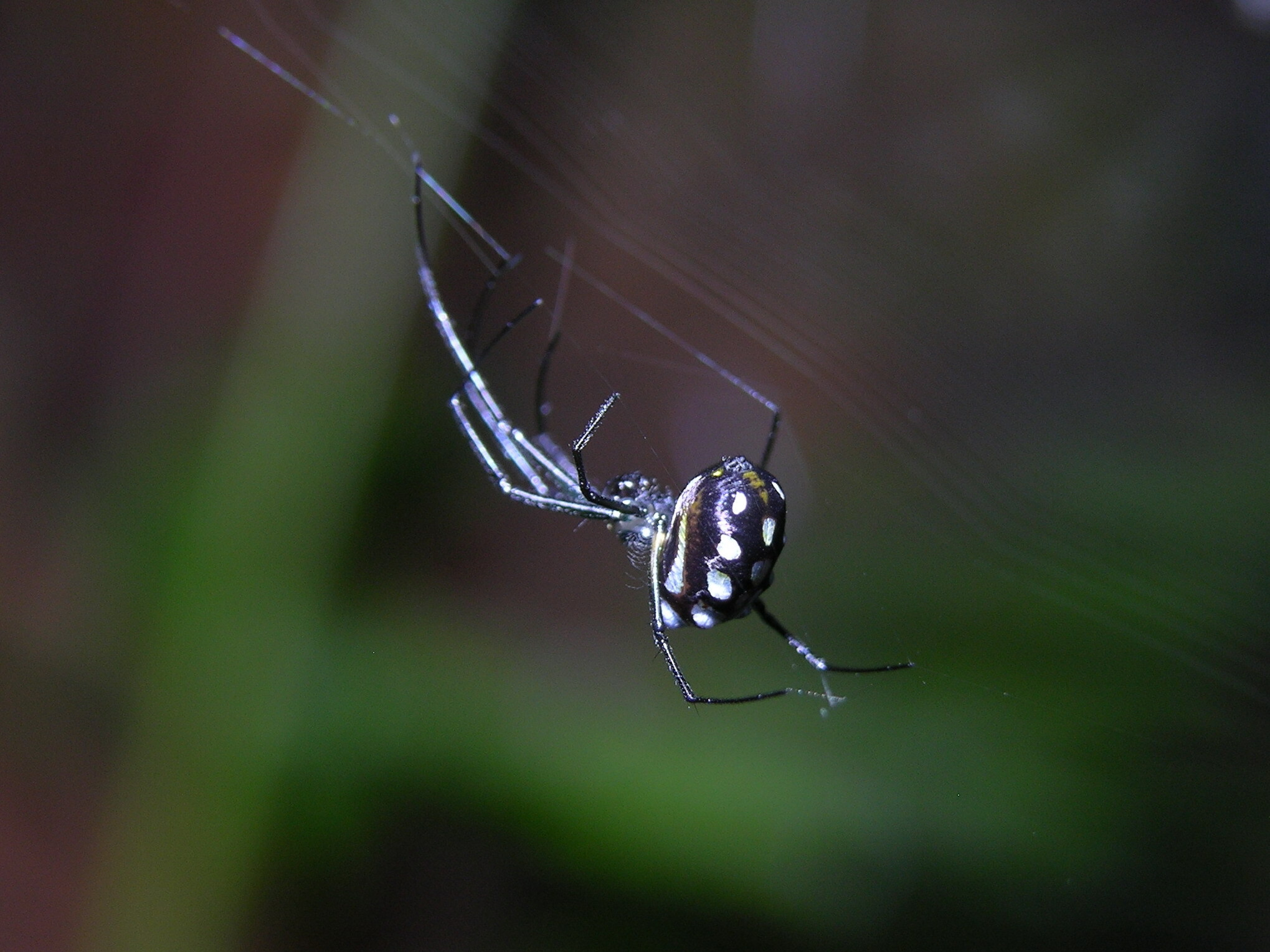
- female from Thailand

Scientific classification
- Kingdom: Animalia
- Phylum: Arthropoda
- Subphylum: Chelicerata
- Class: Arachnida
- Order: Araneae
- Infraorder: Araneomorphae
- Family: Tetragnathidae
- Genus: Leucauge
- Species: L. argentina

Binomial name
- Leucauge argentina (van Hasselt, 1882)

Synonyms
- Theridion argentinum van Hasselt, 1882; Argyroepeira argentina (van Hasselt, 1882)

= Leucauge argentina =

Species of spider

Leucauge argentina is a species of long-jawed orb weaver in the family Tetragnathidae. It was first described by van Hasselt in 1882 as Theridion argentinum from Sumatra, Indonesia.

== Distribution ==
L. argentina is found across Southeast Asia, including Thailand, Singapore, Indonesia (Sumatra), the Philippines, and Taiwan. The species was first recorded from Taiwan by Tso and Tanikawa in 2000.

== Description ==
Based on specimens from Taiwan, females are larger than males. Females have a total body length of approximately 4.34 mm, while males measure about 2.60 mm. The carapace is yellowish with a darker head region, and the legs are brown without distinct banding patterns. The abdomen displays silver speckles and black markings.

The carapace length to width ratio is about 1.30 in females and 1.25 in males. Female specimens have a distinctive epigynum structure, while males possess characteristic palpal features used for identification.

== Habitat ==
L. argentina constructs orb webs and is associated with agricultural areas, particularly rice fields in Southeast Asia.
