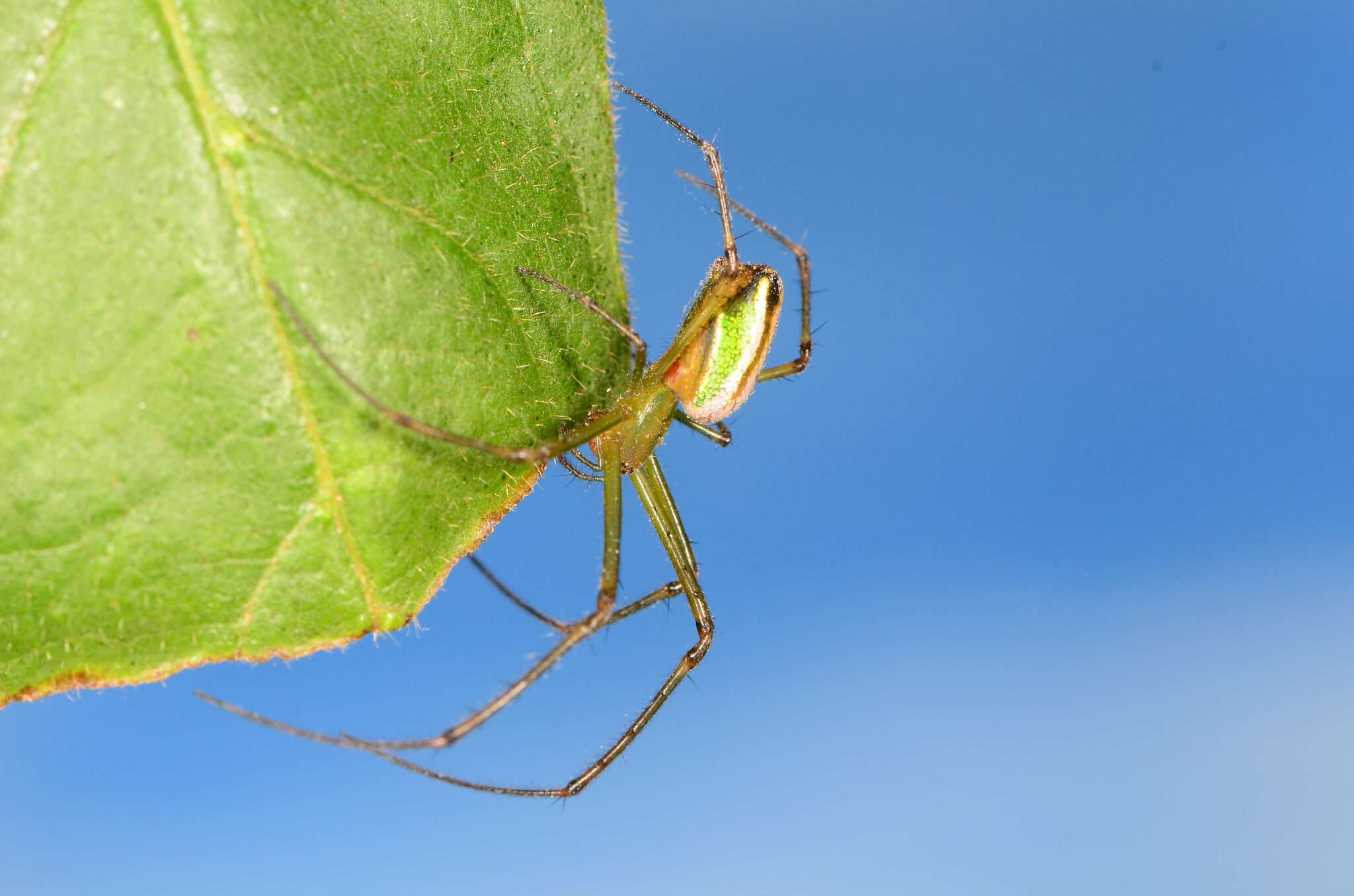
- female
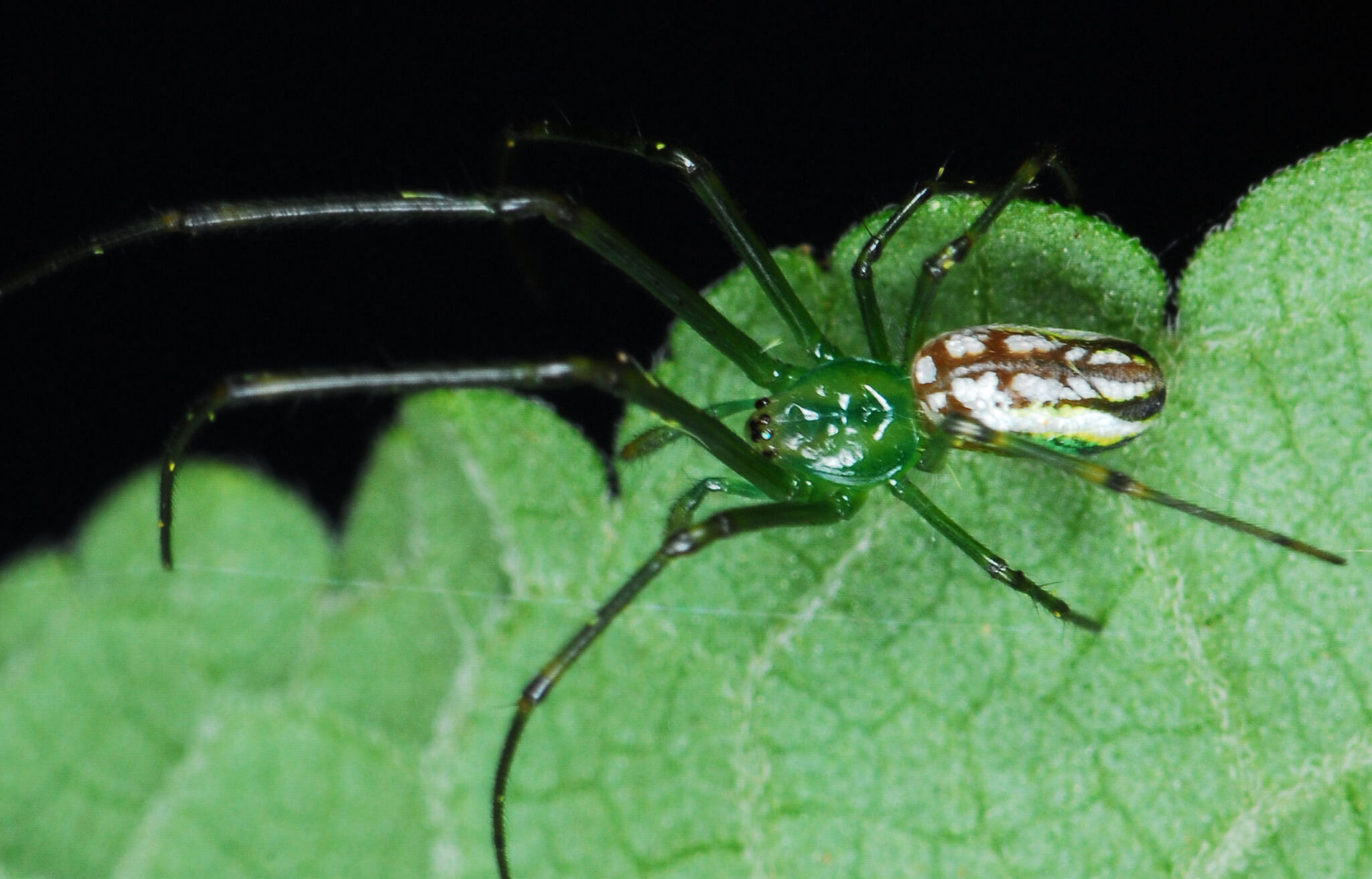
- female

Scientific classification
- Kingdom: Animalia
- Phylum: Arthropoda
- Subphylum: Chelicerata
- Class: Arachnida
- Order: Araneae
- Infraorder: Araneomorphae
- Family: Tetragnathidae
- Genus: Leucauge
- Species: L. auronotum

Binomial name
- Leucauge auronotum Strand, 1907

= Leucauge auronotum =

Auronotum Silver Vlei Spider

Species of spider

Leucauge auronotum is a species of spider in the family Tetragnathidae. It is endemic to South Africa and is commonly known as the auronotum silver vlei spider.

== Distribution ==
Leucauge auronotum is found in the South African provinces of Free State, Gauteng, KwaZulu-Natal, Limpopo, Mpumalanga and Western Cape. Notable locations include Giant's Castle Nature Reserve, Lekgalameetse Nature Reserve, Kruger National Park, and Bontebok National Park.

== Habitat and ecology ==
The species builds large orb-webs, usually near water or in shaded damp areas. They are active during the day, hanging head down in their webs. The plane of the web varies from slightly horizontal to 45 degrees.

The species has been sampled from Grassland and Savanna biomes at altitudes ranging from 63 to 1,842 m.

== Description ==
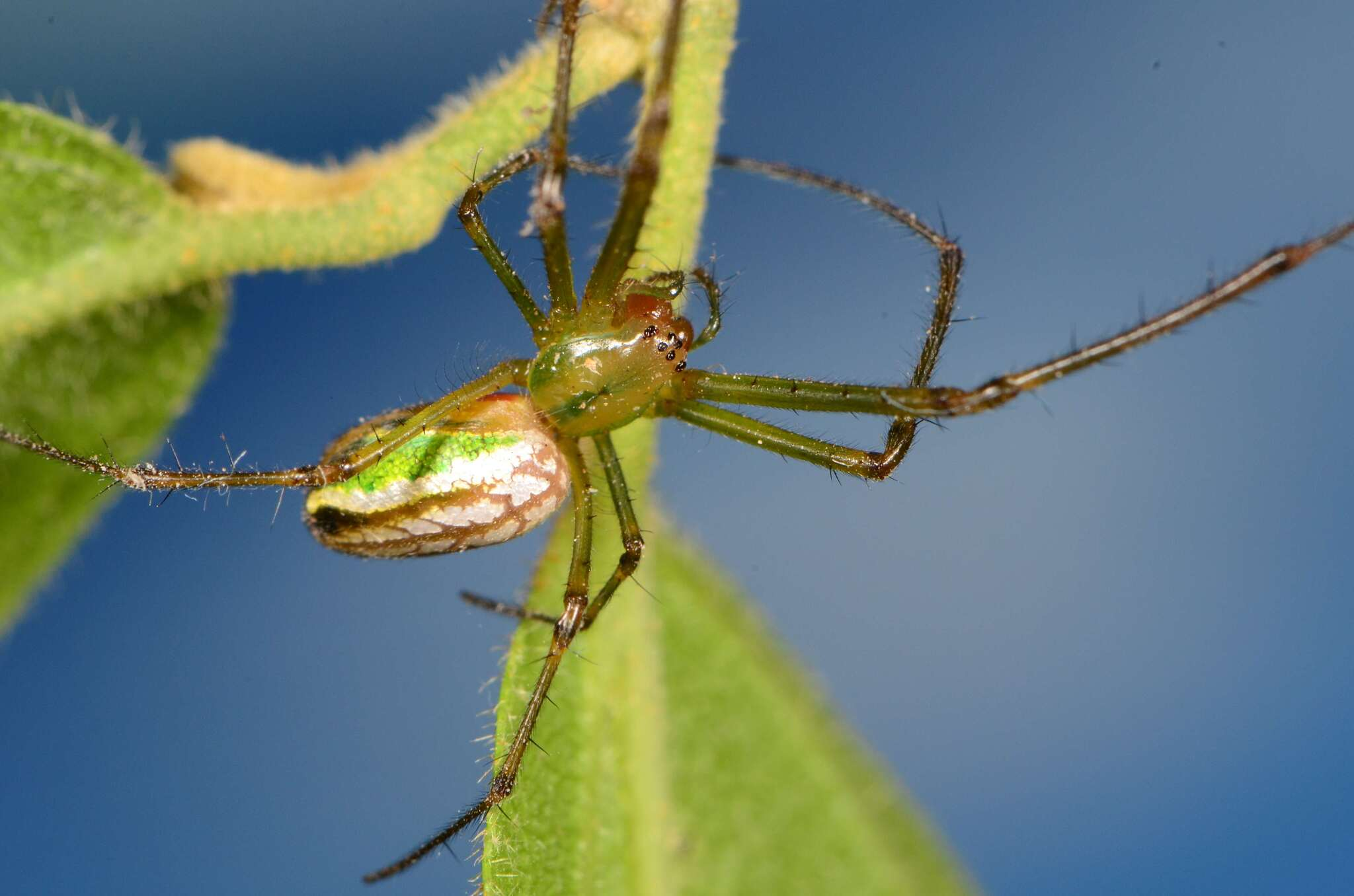
female

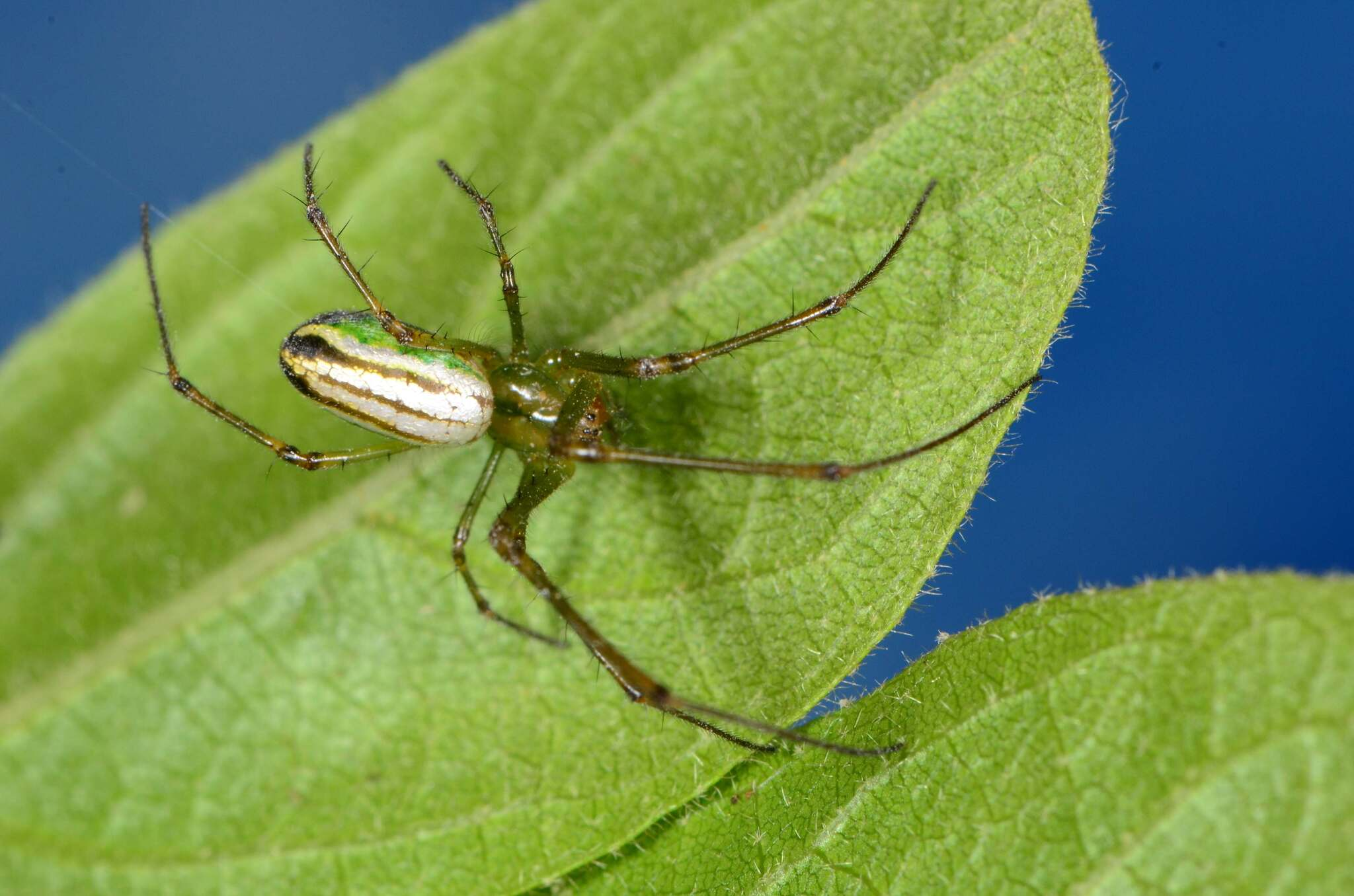
female

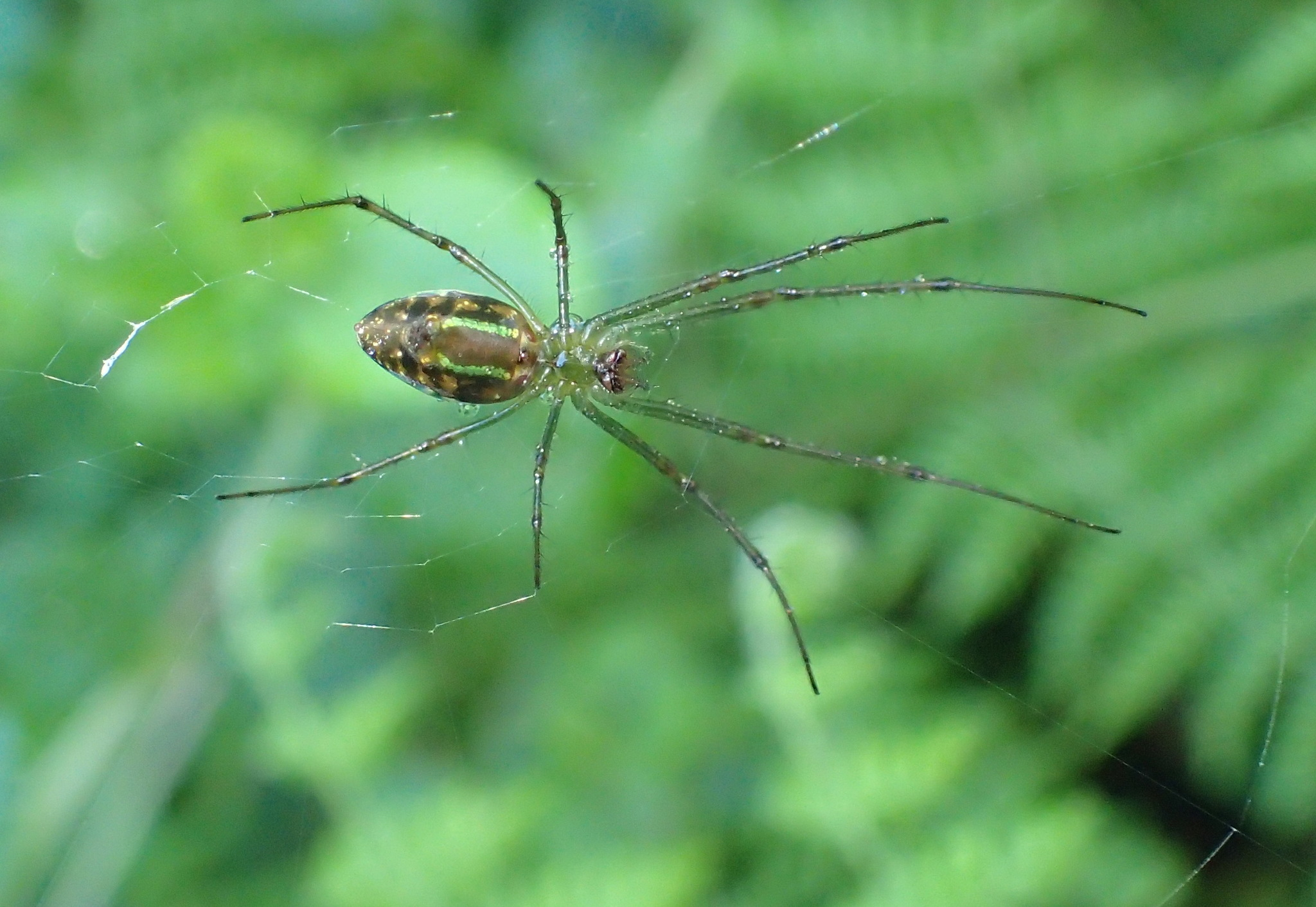

The species is medium-sized with an elongate abdomen with green bands on a white background with a blunt posterior end.

The species, which is only known from females, resembles L. festiva but is less brightly coloured. The epigyne has a scape.

== Conservation ==
Leucauge auronotum is listed as Least Concern by the South African National Biodiversity Institute. Although presently known only from females, the species has a wide geographical range. It is protected in Giant's Castle Nature Reserve, Lekgalameetse Nature Reserve, Kruger National Park, and Bontebok National Park.

== Taxonomy ==
The species was originally described by Embrik Strand in 1907 with the type locality given only as Cape. Nentwig and colleagues listed the species as a nomen dubium in 2020, but it was removed from nomen dubium status by Dippenaar-Schoeman and colleagues in 2020.
