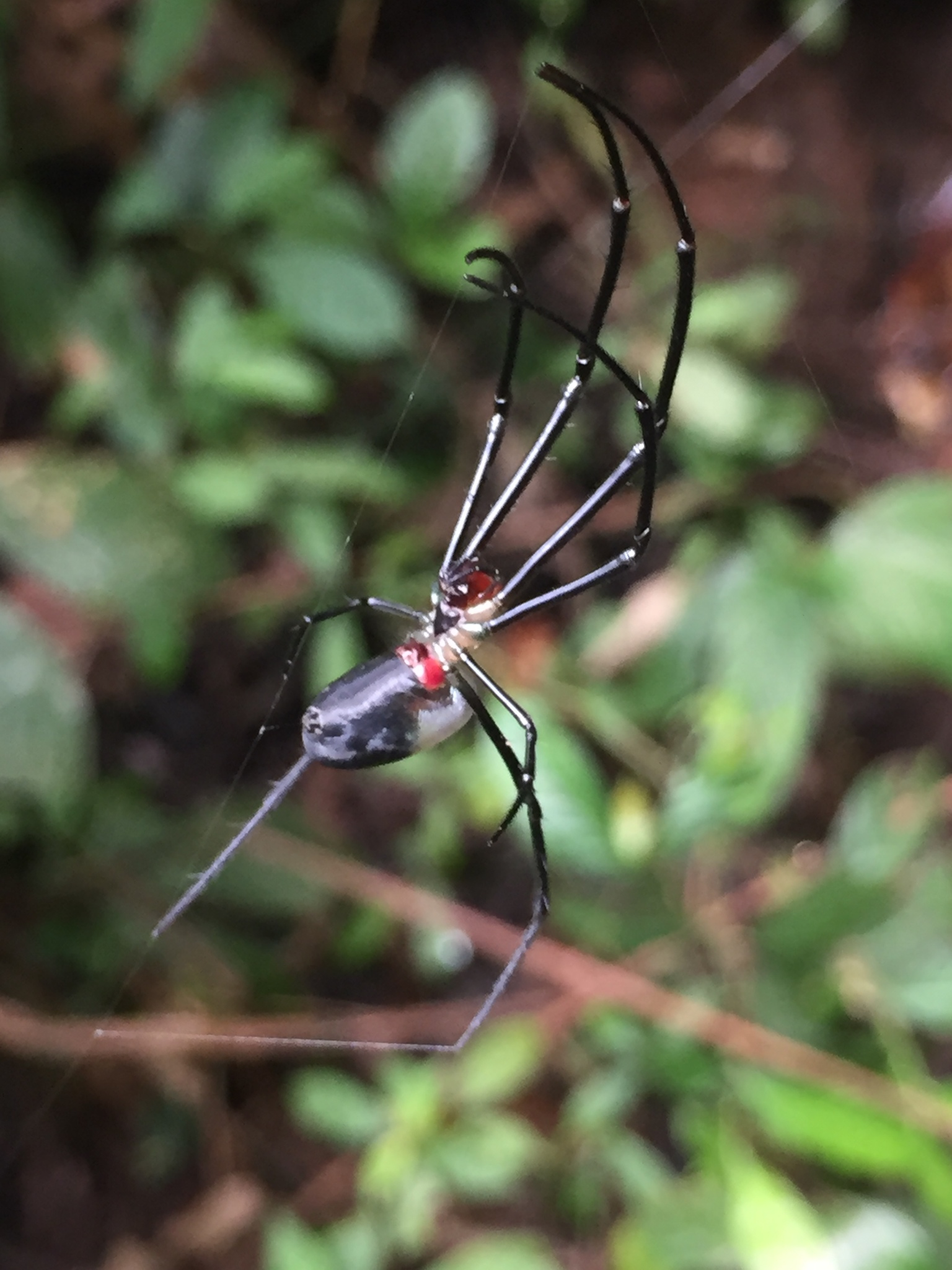
- female from Ecuador

Scientific classification
- Kingdom: Animalia
- Phylum: Arthropoda
- Subphylum: Chelicerata
- Class: Arachnida
- Order: Araneae
- Infraorder: Araneomorphae
- Family: Tetragnathidae
- Genus: Leucauge
- Species: L. behemoth

Binomial name
- Leucauge behemoth Ferreira-Sousa, Venticinque, Motta & Brescovit, 2023

= Leucauge behemoth =

Species of spider

Leucauge behemoth is a species of orb-weaver spider in the family Tetragnathidae. It is found in Brazil, Colombia, Ecuador, and Peru.

== Description ==
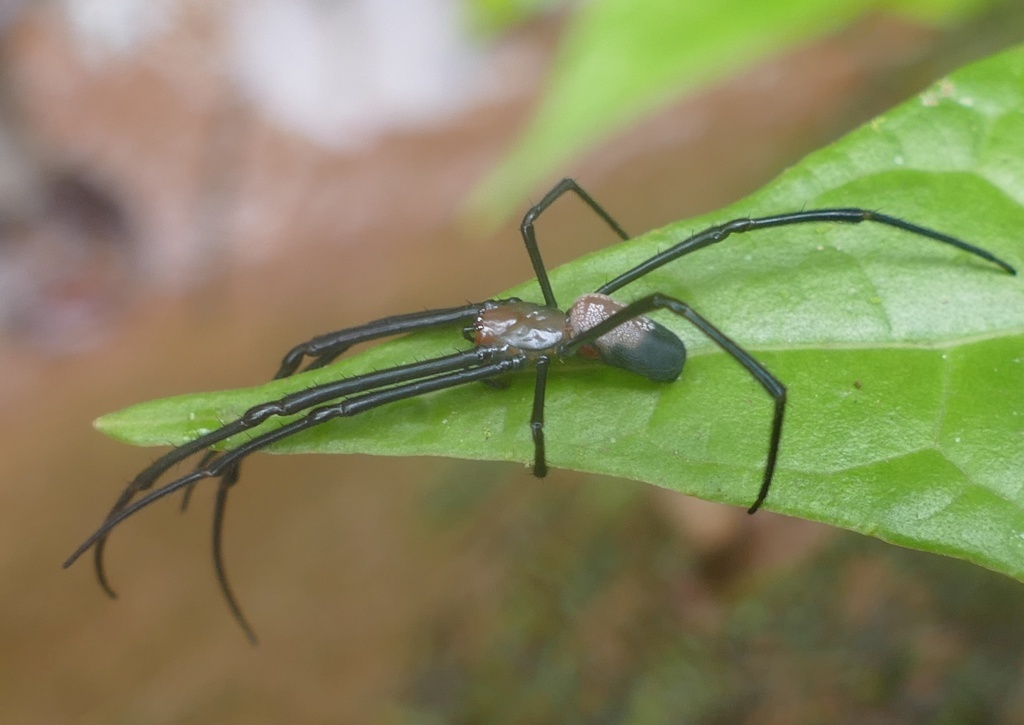
female from Ecuador

Leucauge behemoth is notable for its large size compared to other Neotropical species in the genus, with females measuring 8.8 to 11.9 mm in total length. The species has a distinctive coloration with the anterior half of the abdomen covered in silver guanine patches and the posterior half black with two median parallel lines of guanine dots. Living specimens display a brownish orange cephalic region, green thoracic region, and bright red booklung covers.

Males can be distinguished from the closely related Leucauge argyra by their longer paracymbium and lack of a dorsobasal process on the palp. Females differ from L. argyra by having a rounded rather than conical ventral process on the epigynum, and unlike most Leucauge species, females lack an anterior hood on the epigynum.

== Distribution ==
L. behemoth has been recorded from the Amazon rainforest region across four South American countries. In Brazil, it has been found in the states of Amazonas, Acre, and Mato Grosso. The species also occurs in Colombia (Putumayo Department), Ecuador (Napo Province), and Peru (Loreto Region).

== Behavior ==
Leucauge behemoth is the first species in its genus documented to exhibit complex colonial behavior with generation overlap. Colonies typically contain 3 to 22 individuals of various ages and show vertical stratification, with spiders of different sizes occupying different heights within the colony. Small spiders under 2 mm do not build individual orb webs but live on the supporting threads of larger colony members' webs. Larger individuals build webs at different vertical levels, with the largest spiders (9-11 mm) occupying the intermediate and higher parts of colonies.

The colonies are commonly found along stretches of streams with turbulent waters, possibly related to increased flying insect prey availability. When disturbed, colony members exhibit coordinated escape behavior, fleeing in groups to surrounding vegetation and returning after 10-20 minutes.

== Etymology ==
The species name "behemoth" is derived from the mythological beast and references the remarkable large size of this species compared to other Leucauge species.
