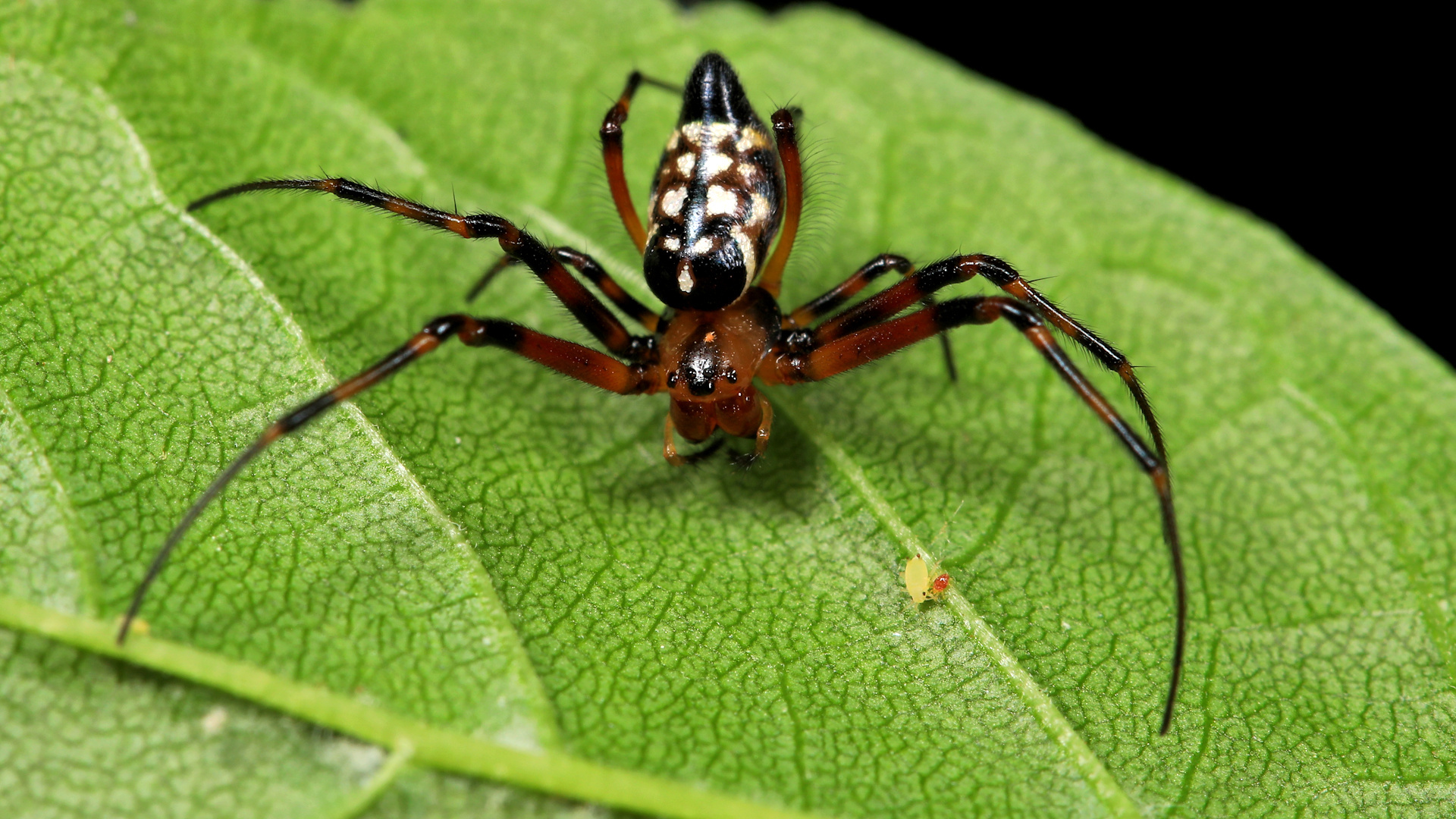

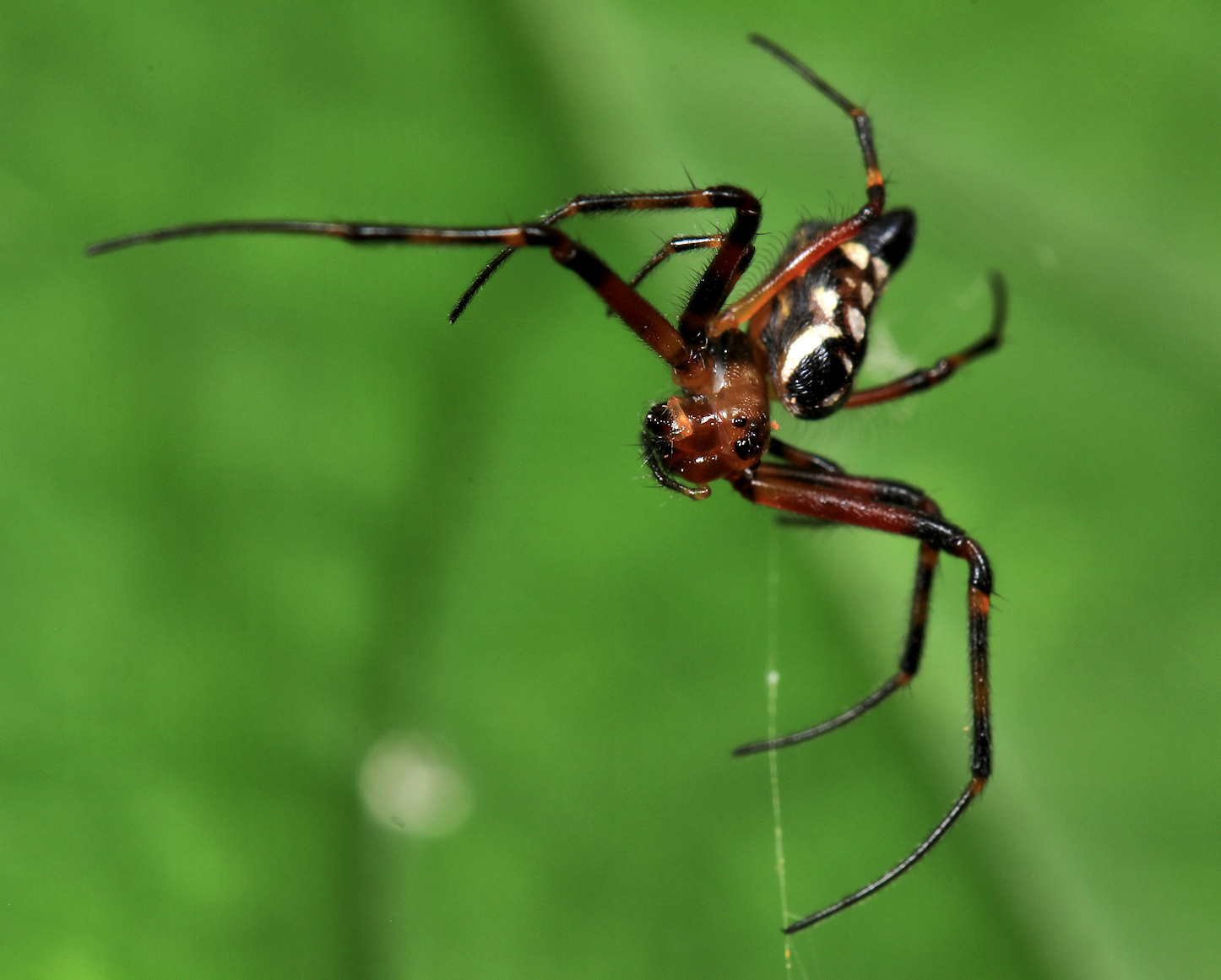

Scientific classification
- Kingdom: Animalia
- Phylum: Arthropoda
- Subphylum: Chelicerata
- Class: Arachnida
- Order: Araneae
- Infraorder: Araneomorphae
- Family: Tetragnathidae
- Genus: Leucauge
- Species: L. medjensis

Binomial name
- Leucauge medjensis Lessert, 1930

= Leucauge medjensis =

Medjensis Silver Vlei Spider

Species of spider

Leucauge medjensis is a species of spider in the family Tetragnathidae. It is commonly known as the medjensis silver vlei spider.

== Distribution ==
Leucauge medjensis is found in Democratic Republic of the Congo, Tanzania, and South Africa.

In South Africa, the species is recorded from the provinces Eastern Cape, KwaZulu-Natal, Limpopo, and Mpumalanga.

== Habitat and ecology ==
The species makes orb-webs in vegetation and has been sampled from Forest, Indian Ocean Coastal Belt, Grassland, Savanna, and Thicket biomes at altitudes ranging from 29 to 1,297 m. It has also been recorded from citrus orchards.

== Description ==
The species is known only from females. It is small with a round oval abdomen. The abdomen has black spots on the shoulders and the posterior end has a tail.

== Conservation ==
Leucauge medjensis is listed as Least Concern by the South African National Biodiversity Institute due to its wide geographical range. The species is protected in Ndumo Game Reserve.

== Taxonomy ==
The species was originally described by Roger de Lessert in 1930 from what is now the Democratic Republic of the Congo.
