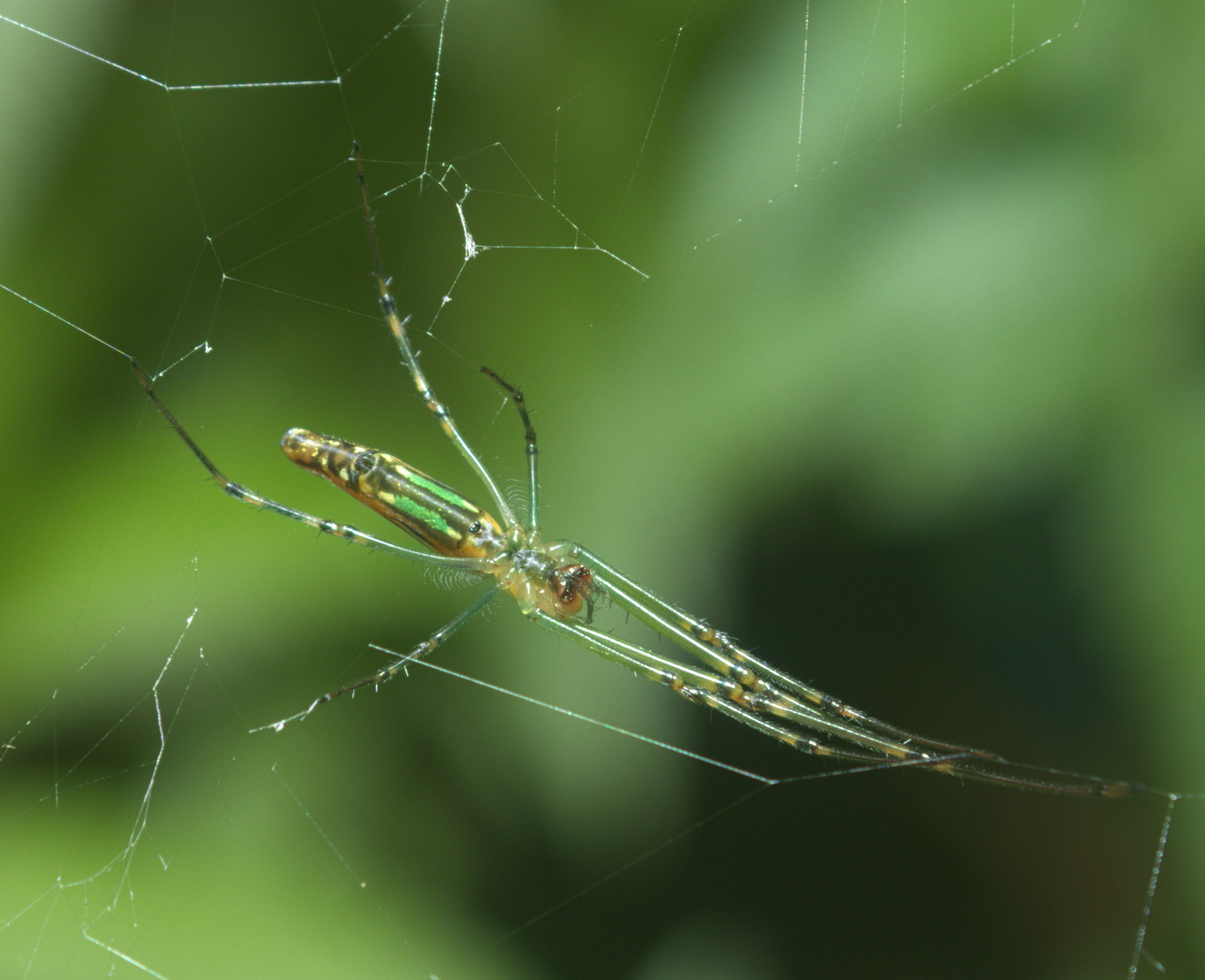
- from Hong Kong

Scientific classification
- Kingdom: Animalia
- Phylum: Arthropoda
- Subphylum: Chelicerata
- Class: Arachnida
- Order: Araneae
- Infraorder: Araneomorphae
- Family: Tetragnathidae
- Genus: Leucauge
- Species: L. tanikawai

Binomial name
- Leucauge tanikawai Zhu, Song & Zhang, 2003

Synonyms
- Leucauge talagangiba Barrion, Barrion-Dupo & Heong, 2013

= Leucauge tanikawai =

Species of spider

Leucauge tanikawai is a species of long-jawed orb weaver in the family Tetragnathidae. It was first described in 2003 from specimens collected in Hainan and Yunnan provinces of China.

== Taxonomy ==
The species was originally described by Zhu, Song & Zhang in 2003 based on specimens from Jianfengling and Bawangling in Hainan, as well as from Xishuangbanna in Yunnan. In 2013, Leucauge talagangiba was described by Barrion and colleagues from the same region. However, in 2023, Lin and colleagues synonymized L. talagangiba with L. tanikawai, confirming they represent the same species.

The species name honors Japanese arachnologist Dr. Akio Tanikawa for his contributions to spider taxonomy.

== Distribution ==
L. tanikawai is known from southern China, specifically from Hainan Island (Jianfengling and Bawangling) and Yunnan Province (Xishuangbanna).

== Description ==
Females of L. tanikawai measure 8.88–11.00 mm in total body length. The carapace is pale yellowish-brown with fine brownish margins lined with short, fine bristles. The abdomen is triangular and silvery-white with a distinctive tail-like posterior extension that projects beyond the spinnerets.

The dorsal surface of the abdomen features three dark brownish longitudinal stripes that are connected only at the front end. The central stripe has two pairs of branches in the middle section and widens at the tail, extending to the tip of the abdomen. The lateral stripes merge with the ends of the second pair of branches but remain separate from the central stripe. Each side of the abdomen has two dark brownish longitudinal stripes that connect at the posterior end, with three circular silvery-white spots arranged obliquely near the rear margin.

Males are smaller, measuring 4.59–6.21 mm in total body length. They have a more elongated, cylindrical abdomen without prominent shoulder elevations or black spots. The dorsal stripes are pale yellowish-brown, and the tail is shorter and broader than in females.

The species can be distinguished from the similar Leucauge decorata by the position of the median septum in the female epigynum and the shape of the male palpal conductor.
