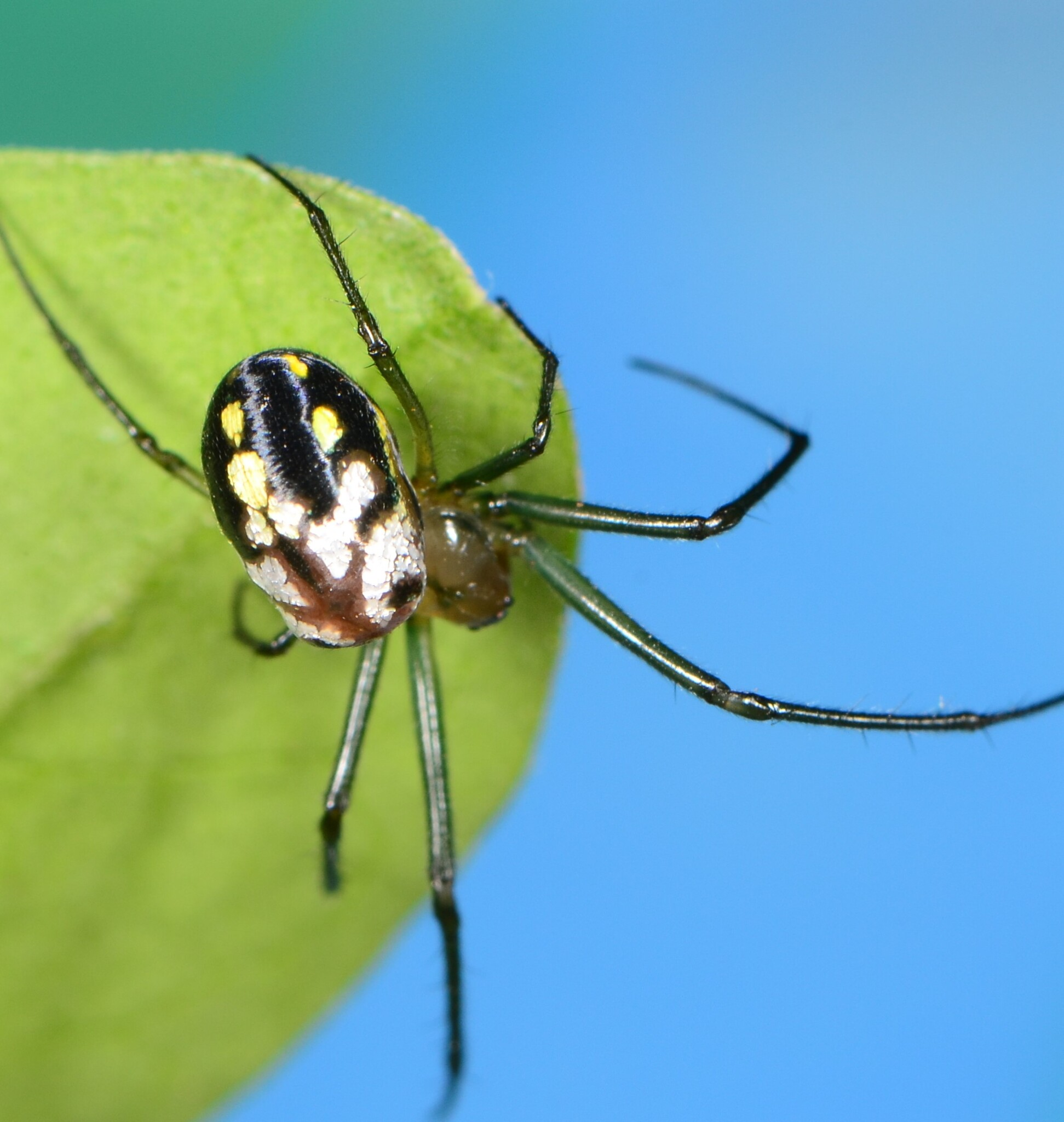
- female
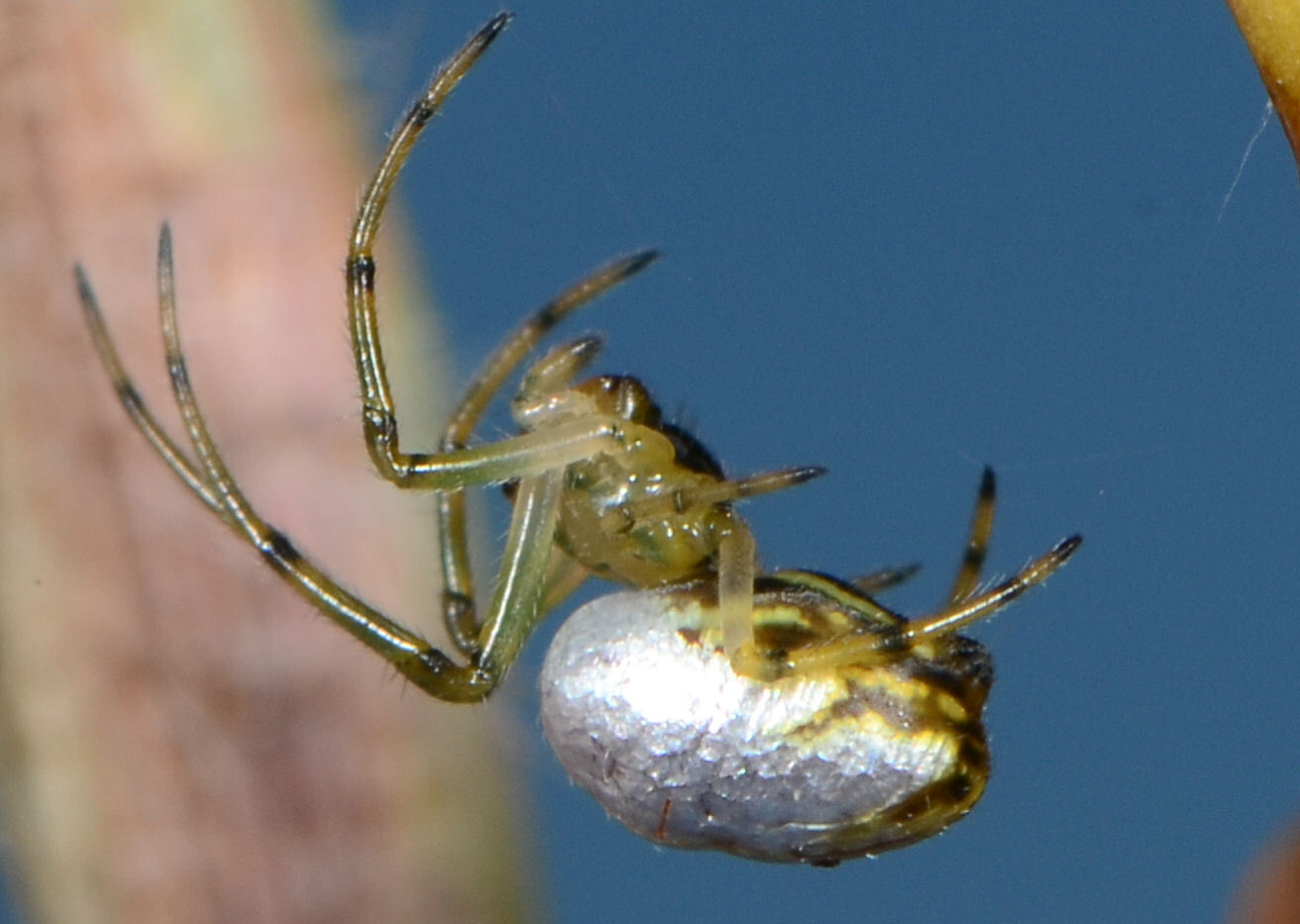
- female

Scientific classification
- Kingdom: Animalia
- Phylum: Arthropoda
- Subphylum: Chelicerata
- Class: Arachnida
- Order: Araneae
- Infraorder: Araneomorphae
- Family: Tetragnathidae
- Genus: Leucauge
- Species: L. argyrescens

Binomial name
- Leucauge argyrescens Benoit, 1978

Synonyms
- Leucauge russellsmithi Locket, 1980

= Leucauge argyrescens =

Species of spider

Leucauge argyrescens is a species of spider in the family Tetragnathidae.

== Distribution ==
Leucauge argyrescens is found in Comoros, Seychelles, Eswatini, and South Africa.

In South Africa, the species is recorded from Eastern Cape, Gauteng, KwaZulu-Natal, Limpopo, Mpumalanga, and Western Cape. Notable locations include Addo Elephant National Park, Diepwalle Forest Station, and various forest sites across the provinces.

== Habitat and ecology ==
This small spider species resides in orb-webs built on low bushes and plants near ground level. The species has been sampled sweeping vegetation from the Forest, Savanna and Thicket biomes at altitudes ranging from 19 to 1,327 m.

== Description ==
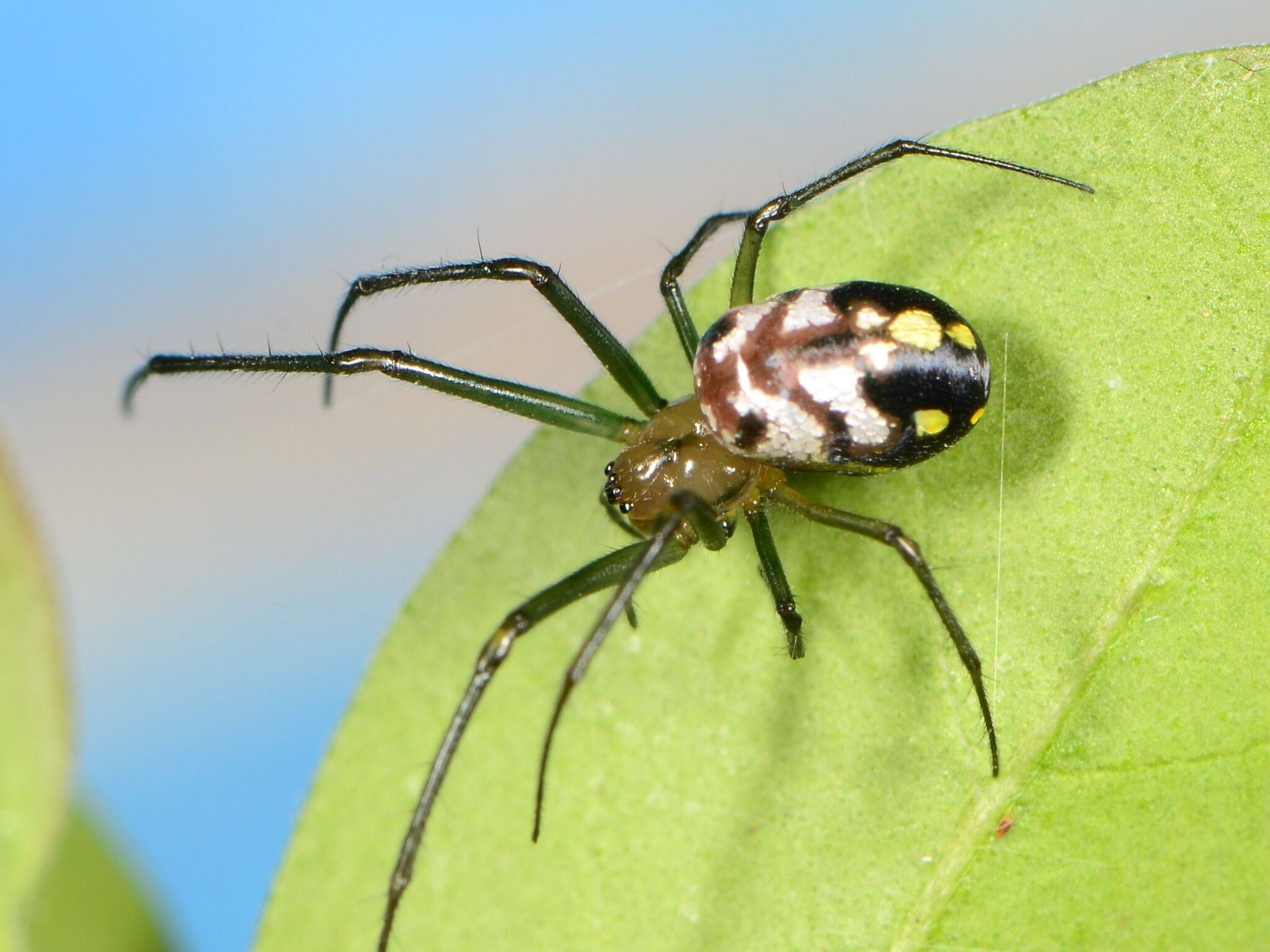

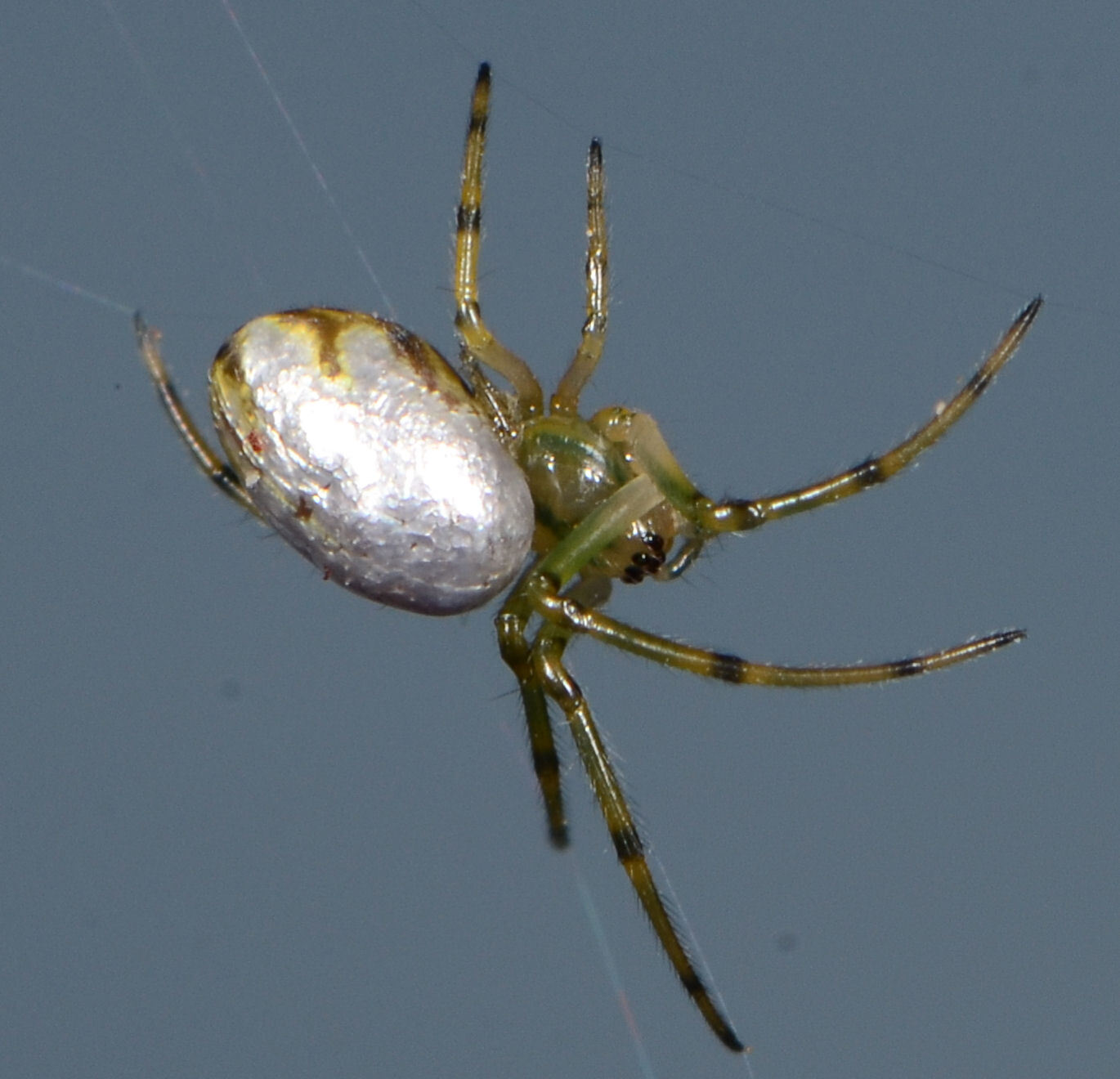

== Conservation ==
Leucauge argyrescens is listed as Least Concern by the South African National Biodiversity Institute due to its wide geographical range. The species is protected in several forest stations and in Londolozi Game Reserve.

== Taxonomy ==
The species was originally described by Pierre Benoit in 1978 from the Seychelles. Saaristo in 2003 synonymized Leucauge russellsmithi with L. argyrescens.
