= Leucauge ditissima =

Scientific classification
- Kingdom: Animalia
- Phylum: Arthropoda
- Subphylum: Chelicerata
- Class: Arachnida
- Order: Araneae
- Infraorder: Araneomorphae
- Family: Tetragnathidae
- Genus: Leucauge
- Species: L. ditissima

Binomial name
- Leucauge ditissima (Thorell, 1887)

Species of spider

Leucauge ditissima, is a species of spider of the genus Leucauge. It is found in Sri Lanka and Myanmar.
