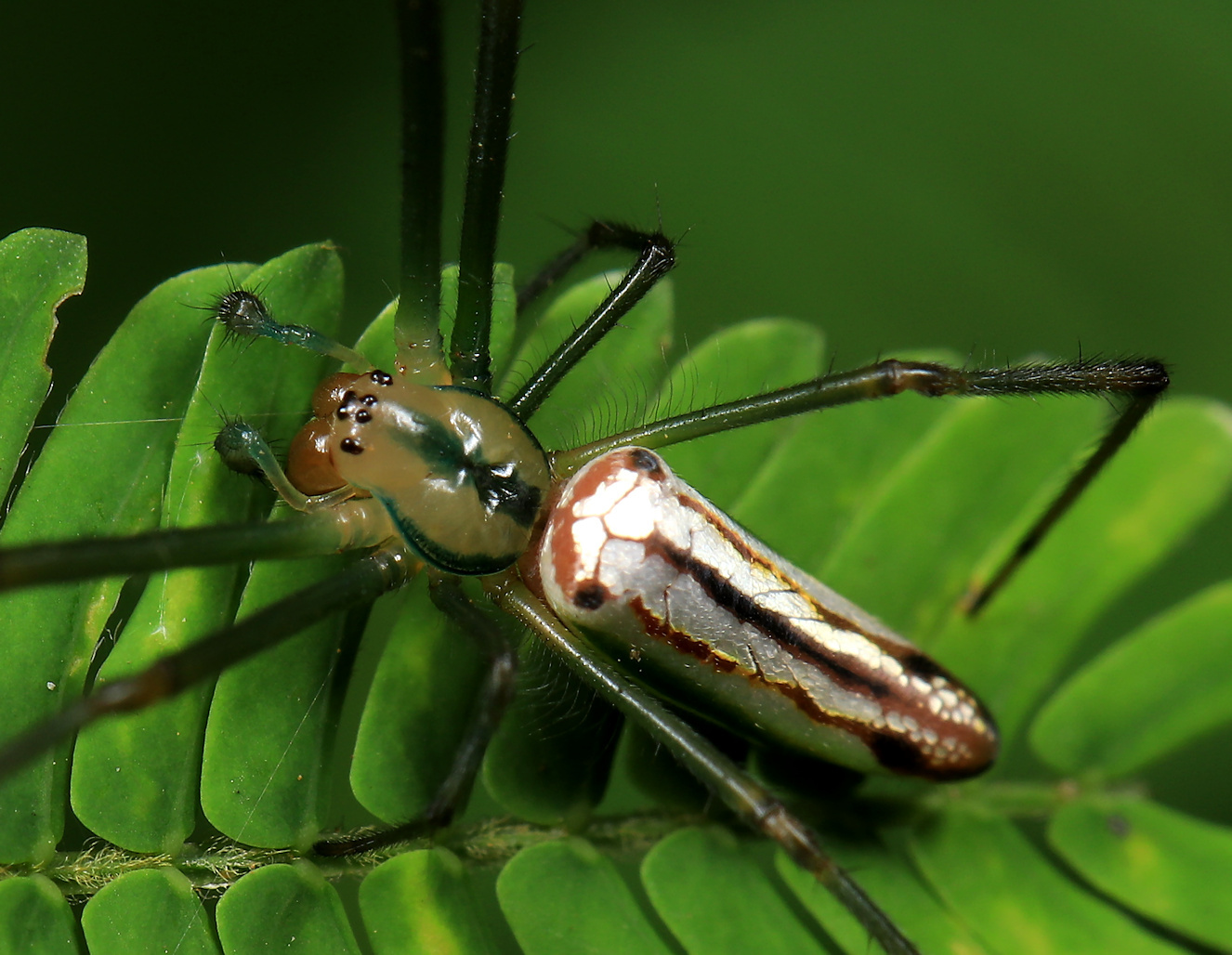
- female
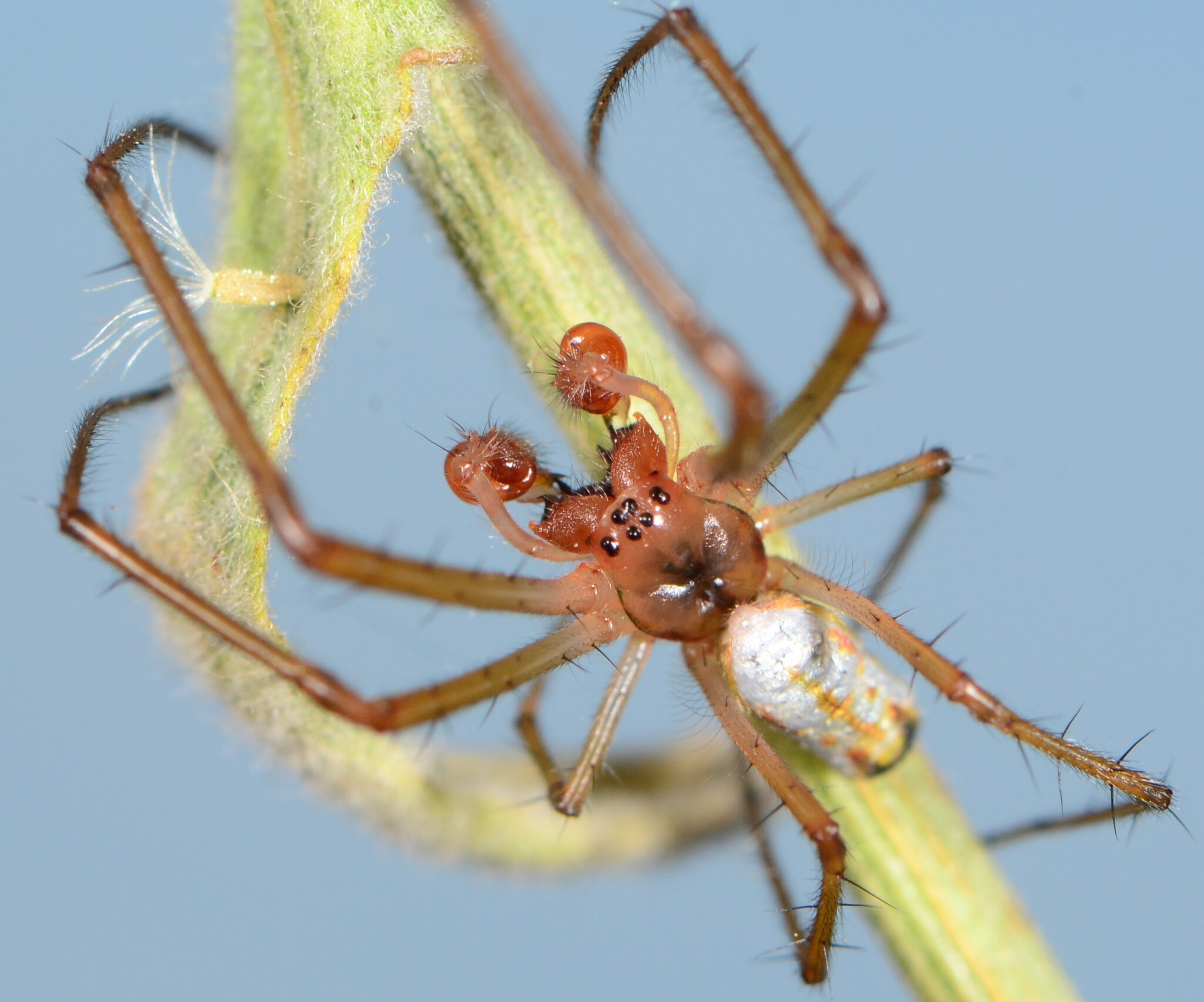
- male

Scientific classification
- Kingdom: Animalia
- Phylum: Arthropoda
- Subphylum: Chelicerata
- Class: Arachnida
- Order: Araneae
- Infraorder: Araneomorphae
- Family: Tetragnathidae
- Genus: Leucauge
- Species: L. levanderi

Binomial name
- Leucauge levanderi (Kulczyński, 1901)

Synonyms
- Argyroepeira levanderii Kulczyński, 1901

= Leucauge levanderi =

Levander Silver Vlei Spider

Species of spider

Leucauge levanderi is a species of spider in the family Tetragnathidae. It is commonly known as the Levander silver vlei spider.

== Distribution ==
Leucauge levanderi is found in Ethiopia, Congo Republic, and South Africa.

In South Africa, the species is recorded from the provinces Eastern Cape, Gauteng, KwaZulu-Natal, Limpopo, Mpumalanga, and Western Cape.

== Habitat and ecology ==
The species makes orb-webs in the Fynbos, Forest, Indian Ocean Coastal Belt, Grassland, Savanna, and Thicket biomes at altitudes ranging from 15 to 1,871 m.

== Description ==
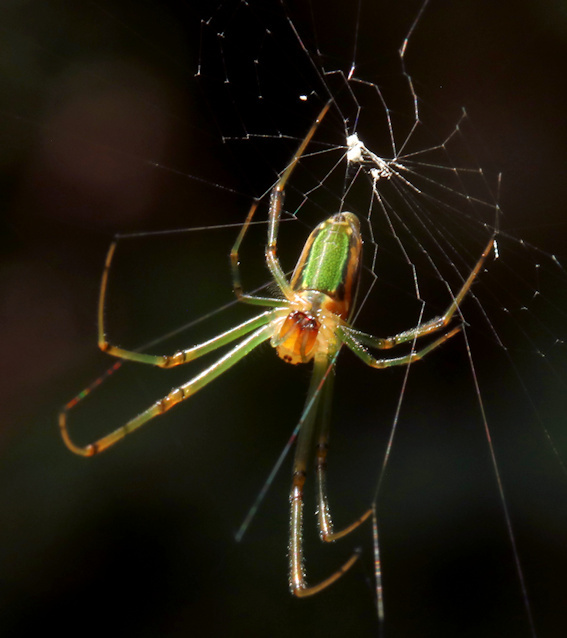
female

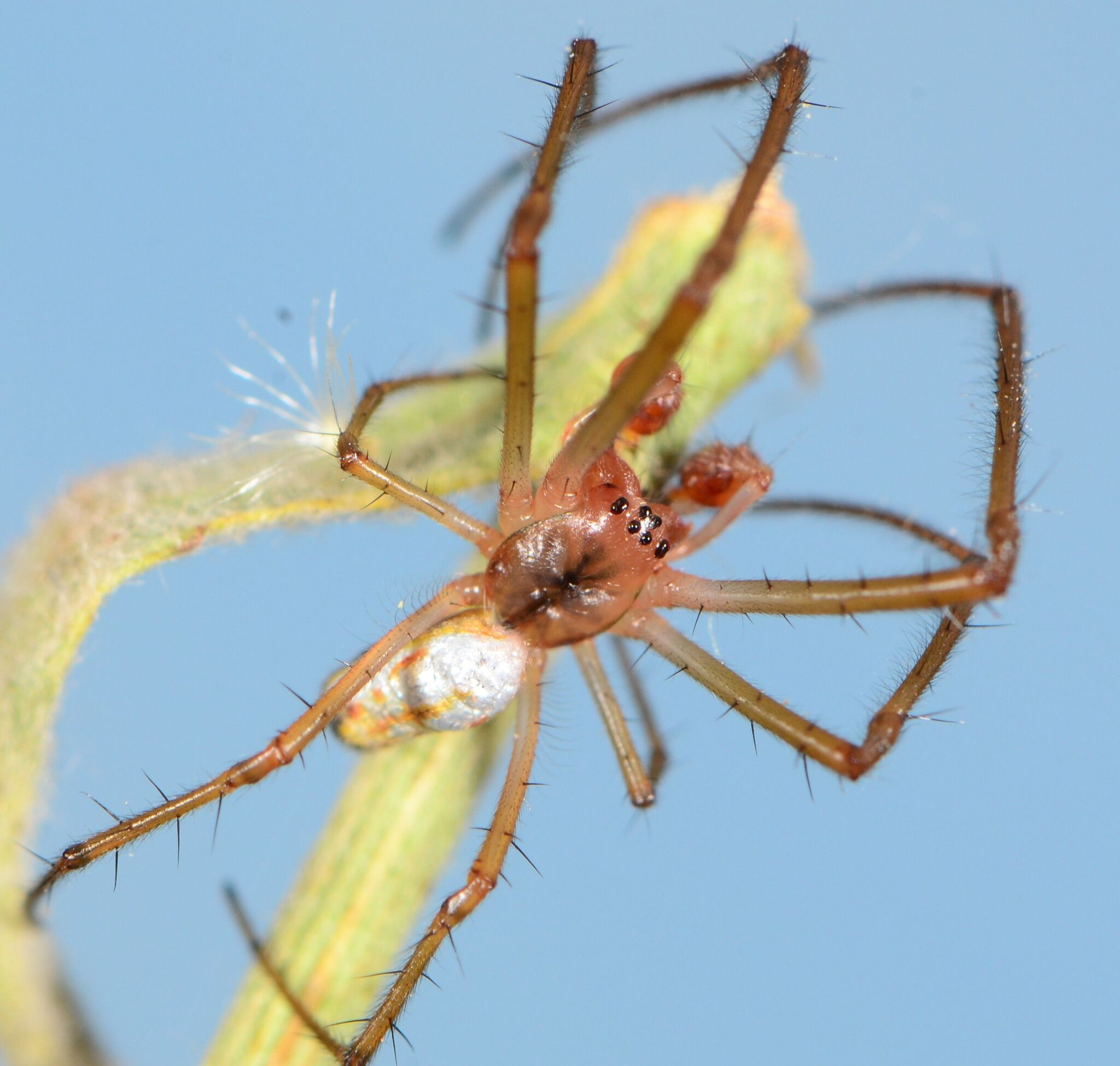
male

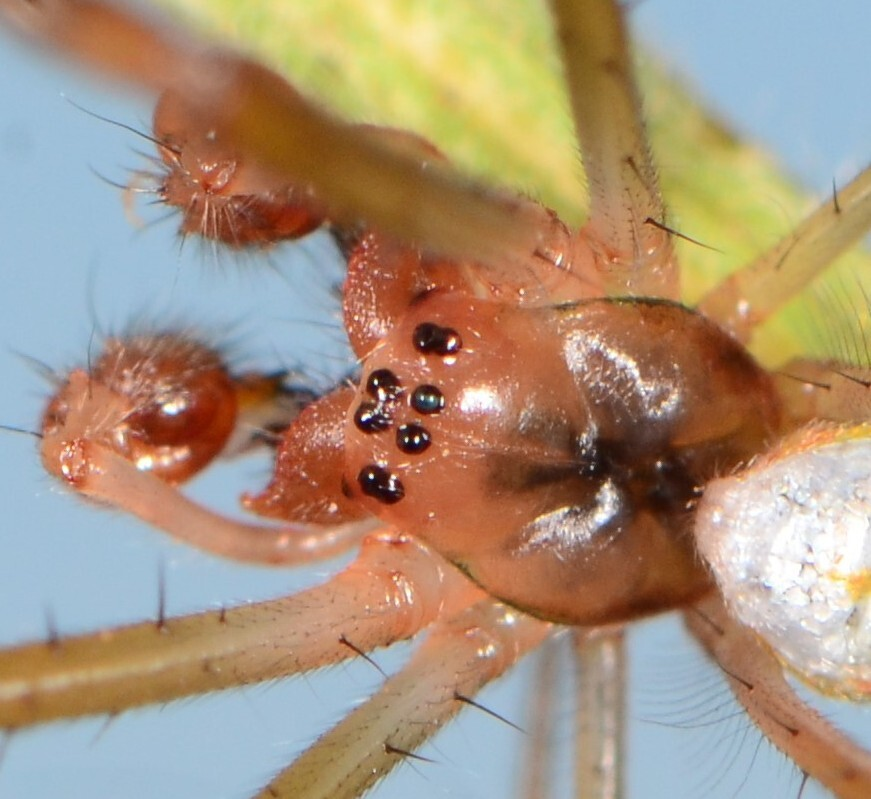
male

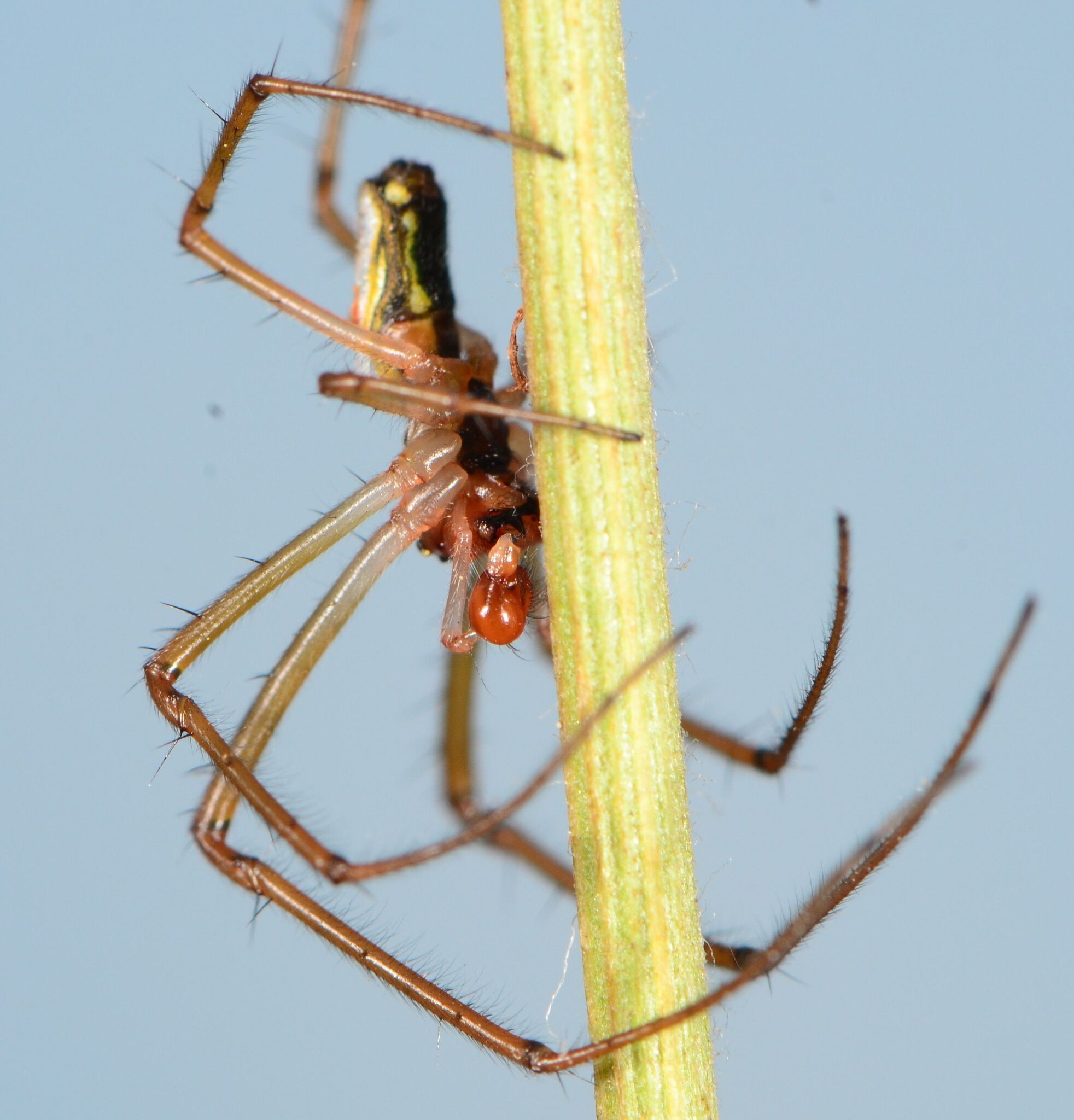
male

The species is medium-sized with an elongate abdomen. The posterior end has a tip extending slightly past the spinnerets. The abdomen displays bright colours.

The epigyne has a keyhole shape. Male chelicerae have tubercles.

== Conservation ==
Leucauge levanderi is listed as Least Concern by the South African National Biodiversity Institute due to its wide geographical range. The species is protected in several areas including Addo Elephant National Park, Garden Route National Park, Blouberg Nature Reserve, Lajuma Mountain Retreat, Lekgalameetse Nature Reserve, and De Hoop Nature Reserve.

== Etymology ==
The species is named after Kaarlo Mainio Levander, a Finnish zoologist.

== Taxonomy ==
The species was originally described by Władysław Kulczyński in 1901 from Ethiopia as Argyroepeira levanderii.
