= Leucauge argenteanigra =

Scientific classification
- Domain: Eukaryota
- Kingdom: Animalia
- Phylum: Arthropoda
- Subphylum: Chelicerata
- Class: Arachnida
- Order: Araneae
- Infraorder: Araneomorphae
- Family: Tetragnathidae
- Genus: Leucauge
- Species: L. argenteanigra

Binomial name
- Leucauge argenteanigra (Karsch, 1884)

Synonyms
- Meta argenteanigra Karsch, 1884

Species of spider

Leucauge argenteanigra is an endemic long-jawed orb weaving spider species of the family Tetragnathidae that lives on São Tomé Island. It was first described in 1884 by Ferdinand Karsch as Meta argenteanigra.
