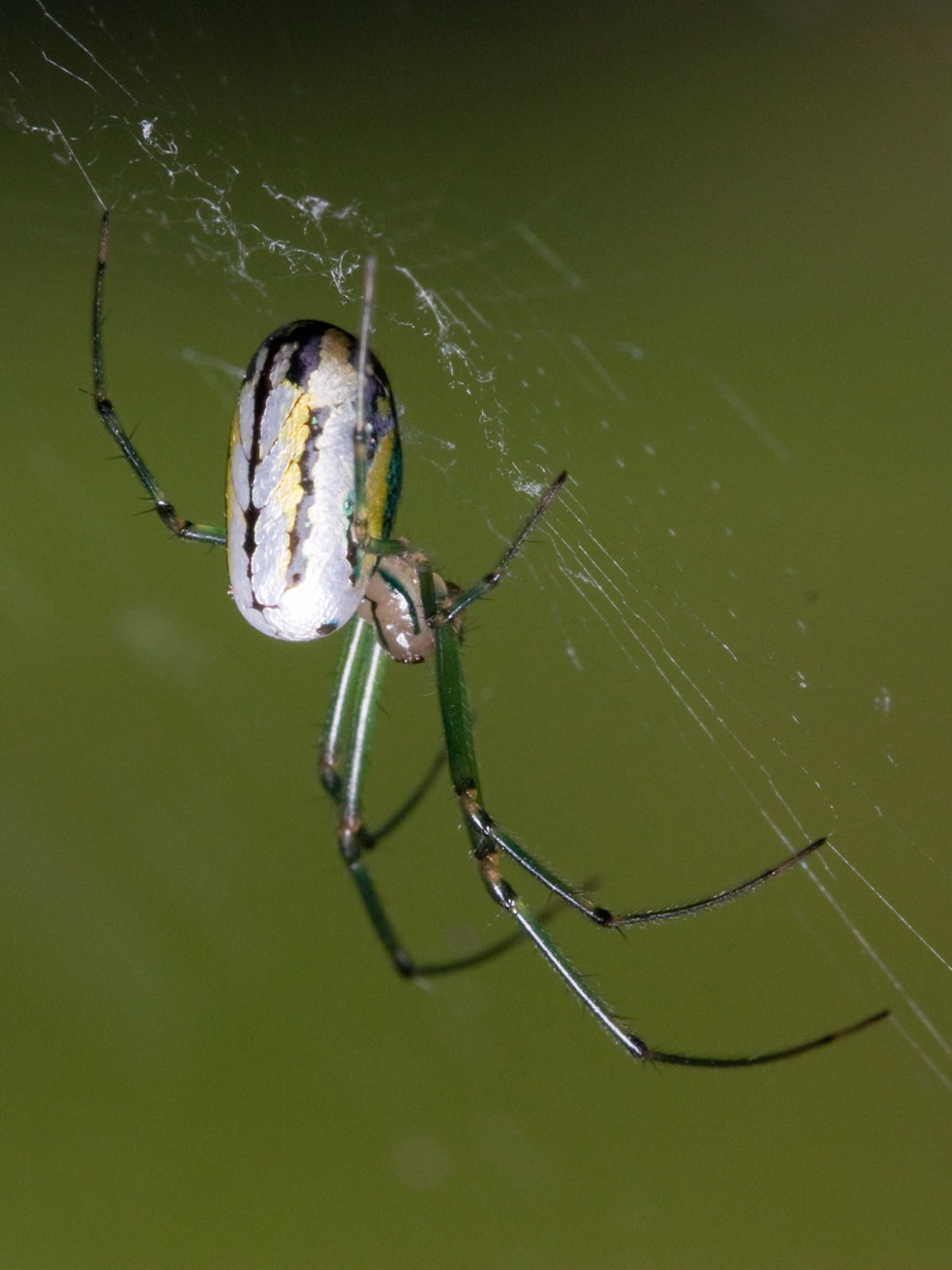
- Leucauge venusta (orchard spider)
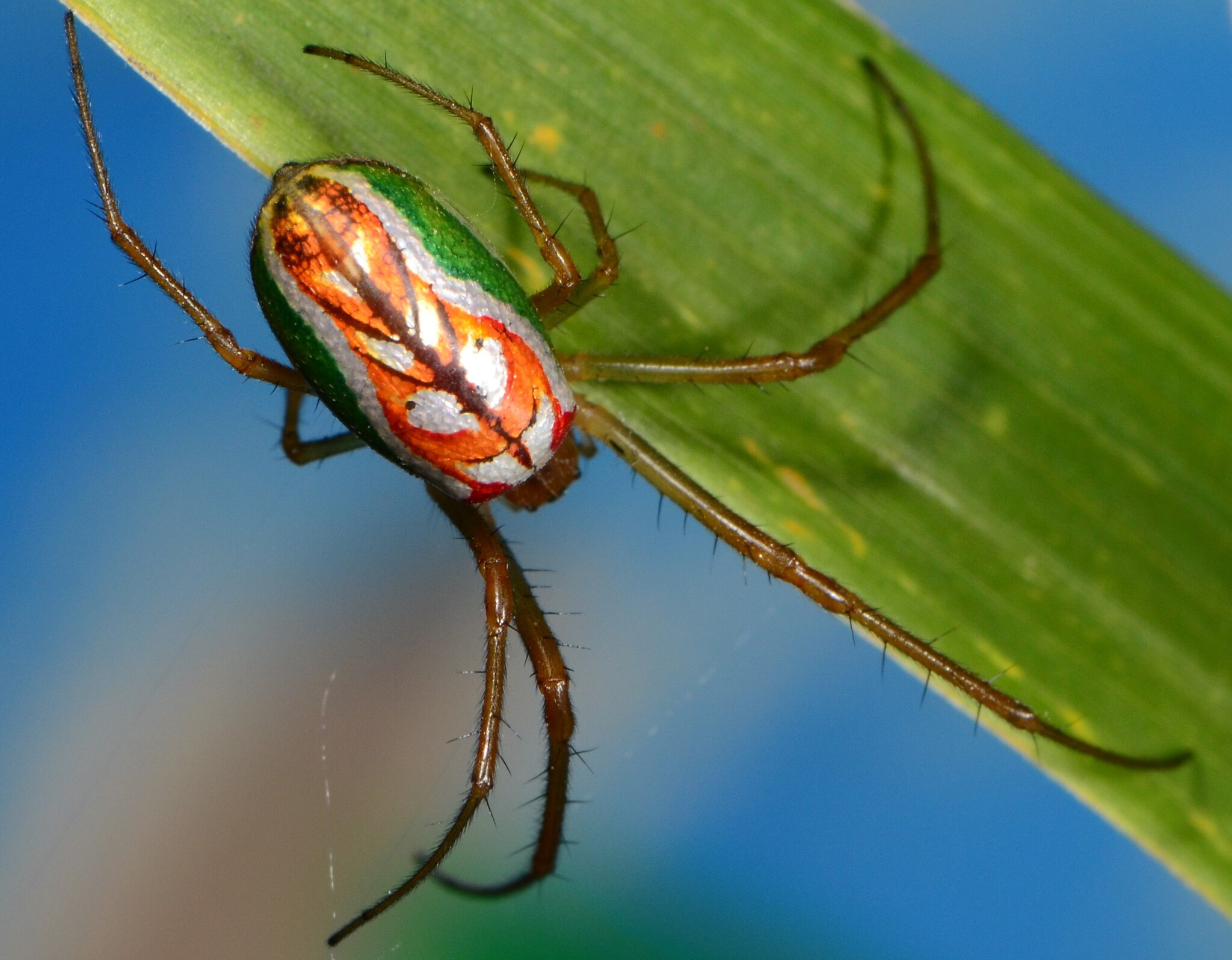
- Leucauge festiva

Scientific classification
- Kingdom: Animalia
- Phylum: Arthropoda
- Subphylum: Chelicerata
- Class: Arachnida
- Order: Araneae
- Infraorder: Araneomorphae
- Family: Tetragnathidae
- Genus: Leucauge; White, 1841

Diversity
- 167 species

Synonyms
- Alcimosphenus Simon, 1895; Mecynometa Simon, 1894; Opadometa Archer, 1951; Opas O. Pickard-Cambridge, 1896; Plesiometa F. O. Pickard-Cambridge, 1903

= Leucauge =

Genus of arachnids (long-jawed orb weaver spiders)

Leucauge is a spider genus of long-jawed orb weavers, with over 160 species and fully pantropical distribution.

== Description ==
The body and leg shapes and the silver, black and yellow markings of Leucauge females make identification of the genus relatively easy. They have two rows of long, slender curved hairs on the femurs of the fourth leg. In most cases the web is slanted rather than vertical and the spider rests in the middle of the web with its underside facing upwards.

=== Detailed description ===
Leucauge species have a total body size of 10-20 mm.

The carapace is slightly longer than wide. There are eight eyes arranged in two rows with lateral eyes contiguous. The chelicerae are variable, being short and stout in some species or long and well developed with rows of large teeth in males. The endites are parallel and the sternum is longer than wide.

The abdomen is variable, being elongated and cylindrical in some species and extending caudally beyond the spinnerets. The abdomen displays distinct green, silver, white and bronze patterns. The spinnerets are unmodified with anterior and posterior pairs similar in size.

The legs have three claws and are long and slender. The posterior femora have a double fringe of trichobothria on the prolateral surface of the basal half.

== Life style ==
Leucauge species spin large orb-webs both in the morning and during the day, sometimes reusing the frame and anchor lines. The inclination of the webs varies from vertical to horizontal but is most often at a sharp angle to the ground. The hub is open with clear, widely spaced viscid spirals.

Sometimes webs have more than one occupant, with as many as three spiders sharing a single web, each using a part of it. They are frequently found in damp places such as marshes or rainforest but are not restricted to damp areas.

== Name ==
Greek λευκός (leukos) means "white", while αὐγή (augḗ) means "dawn," so called because Leucauge spiders build their first web before dawn.

== Taxonomy ==
The genus was first documented in Scottish zoologist Adam White's 1841 Description of new or little known Arachnida. Charles Darwin had suggested the name of the genus and collected the first specimen in May 1832, later named L. argyrobapta.

A vague description and the loss of the only specimen left the genus ill-defined. Leucauge developed into something of a wastebasket taxon containing 300 loosely related species, until research in the year 2010 resolved L. argyrobapta as a synonym of the quite common L. venusta and allowed revision and reclassing of the genus. However, a 2018 paper restored Leucauge argyrobapta as a separate species.

== Species ==
The World Spider Catalog accepted 174 species and eight subspecies in the genus as of October 2025.

This number includes:

- Leucauge argyra
- Leucauge argyrobapta
- Leucauge celebesiana
- Leucauge decorata
- Leucauge digna (worthy orb-weaver) – Saint Helena
- Leucauge dromedaria (silver orb-weaver, horizontal orb-weaver)
- Leucauge mabelae
- Leucauge mariana
- Leucauge subblanda
- Leucauge subgemmea
- Leucauge tessellata
- Leucauge undulata
- Leucauge venusta (orchard spider, orchard orb-weaver)

Complete list
- Leucauge abyssinica Strand, 1907 – Ethiopia
- Leucauge acuminata (O. Pickard-Cambridge, 1889) – Mexico, Central America
- Leucauge albomaculata (Thorell, 1899) – Cameroon
- Leucauge amanica Strand, 1907 – East Africa
- Leucauge analis (Thorell, 1899) – Cameroon, Equatorial Guinea
- Leucauge annulipedella Strand, 1911 – Indonesia (Kei Is.)
- Leucauge apicata (Thorell, 1899) – Cameroon
- Leucauge arbitrariana Strand, 1913 – Papua New Guinea (Bismarck Arch.)
- Leucauge argentea (Keyserling, 1865) – Mexico, Costa Rica (Cocos Is.), Colombia
- Leucauge argenteanigra (Karsch, 1884) – São Tomé and Príncipe
- Leucauge argentina (van Hasselt, 1882) – Singapore, Indonesia (Sumatra), Philippines, Taiwan
  - L. a. nigriceps (Thorell, 1890) – Malaysia
- Leucauge argyra (Walckenaer, 1841) – USA to Brazil, Galapagos
- Leucauge argyrescens Benoit, 1978 – South Africa, Eswatini, Comoros, Seychelles
- Leucauge argyrobapta (White, 1841) – USA to Brazil (type species)
- Leucauge argyrosticta (Simon, 1907) – West Africa, DR Congo
- Leucauge atrostricta Badcock, 1932 – Paraguay
- Leucauge aureosignata (Lenz, 1891) – Madagascar
- Leucauge aurocincta (Thorell, 1877) – Indonesia (Sulawesi, Ambon)
- Leucauge auronotum Strand, 1907 – South Africa
- Leucauge aurostriata (O. Pickard-Cambridge, 1897) – Mexico, Panama
- Leucauge badiensis Roewer, 1961 – Senegal
- Leucauge beata (Pocock, 1901) – India
- Leucauge behemoth Ferreira-Sousa, Venticinque, Motta & Brescovit, 2023 – Colombia, Ecuador, Peru, Brazil
- Leucauge bituberculata Baert, 1987 – Galapagos
- Leucauge blanda (L. Koch, 1878) – Russia (Far East), China, Korea, Taiwan, Japan
- Leucauge bontoc Barrion & Litsinger, 1995 – Philippines
- Leucauge branicki (Taczanowski, 1874) – Ecuador, Guyana, Brazil
- Leucauge brevitibialis Tullgren, 1910 – East Africa
- Leucauge cabindae (Brito Capello, 1866) – West Africa
- Leucauge camelina Caporiacco, 1940 – Ethiopia
- Leucauge camerunensis Strand, 1907 – Cameroon
- Leucauge capelloi Simon, 1903 – Equatorial Guinea
- Leucauge caucaensis Strand, 1908 – Colombia
- Leucauge caudacuta (Taczanowski, 1873) – Peru, Guyana
- Leucauge caudata Hogg, 1914 – New Guinea
- Leucauge caudata (Mello-Leitão, 1944) – Brazil
- Leucauge celebesiana (Walckenaer, 1841) – Russia (Far East), Korea, India to China, Vietnam, Laos, Japan, Indonesia (Sulawesi), New Guinea
- Leucauge clarki Locket, 1968 – Angola
- Leucauge comorensis Schmidt & Krause, 1993 – Comoros
- Leucauge conifera Hogg, 1919 – Indonesia (Sumatra)
- Leucauge cordivittata Strand, 1911 – Indonesia (Kei Is.)
- Leucauge crucinota (Bösenberg & Strand, 1906) – China, Japan
- Leucauge curta (O. Pickard-Cambridge, 1889) – Panama
- Leucauge decorata (Blackwall, 1864) – Tanzania, Botswana, Mozambique, South Africa, Comoros, Pakistan, India, Nepal, Bangladesh, China, Japan, Thailand, Philippines, Indonesia, Papua New Guinea, Australia
  - L. d. nigricauda Schenkel, 1944 – Timor
- Leucauge digna (O. Pickard-Cambridge, 1870) – St. Helena
- Leucauge ditissima (Thorell, 1887) – Sri Lanka, Myanmar
- Leucauge dorsotuberculata Tikader, 1982 – India
- Leucauge dromedaria (Thorell, 1881) – Australia, New Zealand
- Leucauge emertoni (Thorell, 1890) – Indonesia (Nias Is.)
- Leucauge eua Strand, 1911 – Tonga
- Leucauge fasciiventris Kulczyński, 1911 – New Guinea
- Leucauge fastigata (Simon, 1877) – India to Philippines, Indonesia (Sulawesi)
  - L. f. korinchica (Hogg, 1919) – Indonesia (Sumatra)
- Leucauge festiva (Blackwall, 1866) – Ethiopia, Sudan, Kenya, Tanzania, Equatorial Africa, Namibia, South Africa, Eswatini, Madagascar
- Leucauge fibulata (Thorell, 1893) – Singapore
- Leucauge fishoekensis Strand, 1909 – South Africa
- Leucauge formosa (Blackwall, 1863) – Brazil, Argentina
  - L. f. pozonae Schenkel, 1953 – Venezuela
- Leucauge fragilis (O. Pickard-Cambridge, 1889) – Guatemala, Costa Rica
- Leucauge frequens Tullgren, 1910 – East Africa
- Leucauge funebris Mello-Leitão, 1930 – Brazil, French Guiana
- Leucauge gemminipunctata Chamberlin & Ivie, 1936 – Panama, Brazil
- Leucauge gibbosa (Schmidt & Krause, 1993) – Comoros
- Leucauge globosa (O. Pickard-Cambridge, 1889) – Guatemala to Brazil
- Leucauge granulata (Walckenaer, 1841) – India, Sri Lanka, China, Indonesia, (Sunda Is.), French Polynesia
  - L. g. marginata Kulczyński, 1911 – New Guinea
  - L. g. rimitara Strand, 1911 – French Polynesia (Rimitara)
- Leucauge grata (Guérin, 1838) – Japan, Laos, Indonesia, Papua New Guinea, Solomon Islands
- Leucauge hasselti (Thorell, 1890) – Indonesia (Sumatra)
- Leucauge hebridisiana Berland, 1938 – Vanuatu
- Leucauge henryi Mello-Leitão, 1940 – Brazil
- Leucauge idonea (O. Pickard-Cambridge, 1889) – Guatemala to Brazil
- Leucauge ilatele Marples, 1955 – Samoa
- Leucauge insularis (Keyserling, 1865) – Australia (Lord Howe Is.), Samoa
- Leucauge iraray Barrion & Litsinger, 1995 – Philippines
- Leucauge isabela Roewer, 1942 – Equatorial Guinea (Bioko)
- Leucauge japonica (Thorell, 1881) – Japan
- Leucauge kibonotensis Tullgren, 1910 – East Africa
- Leucauge kuchingensis (Dzulhelmi & Suriyanti, 2015) – Borneo
- Leucauge lechei Strand, 1908 – Madagascar
- Leucauge lehmannella Strand, 1908 – Colombia
- Leucauge leprosa (Thorell, 1895) – Myanmar
- Leucauge levanderi (Kulczyński, 1901) – Ethiopia, Congo, South Africa
- Leucauge licina (Simon, 1895) – Caribbean
- Leucauge linyphia Simon, 1903 – Equatorial Guinea
- Leucauge liui Zhu, Song & Zhang, 2003 – China (Hainan), Taiwan
- Leucauge loltuna Chamberlin & Ivie, 1938 – Mexico
- Leucauge lombokiana Strand, 1913 – Indonesia (Lombok, Banda Is.)
- Leucauge longimana (Keyserling, 1881) – Peru
- Leucauge longipes F. O. Pickard-Cambridge, 1903 – Mexico
- Leucauge longula (Thorell, 1878) – Myanmar, Indonesia, (Sumatra)
- Leucauge lugens (O. Pickard-Cambridge, 1896) – Mexico, Panama
- Leucauge macrochoera (Thorell, 1895) – Myanmar, Indonesia (Sumatra)
  - L. m. tenasserimensis (Thorell, 1895) – Myanmar
- Leucauge mahabascapea Barrion & Litsinger, 1995 – Philippines
- Leucauge mahurica Strand, 1913 – Papua New Guinea (Bismarck Arch.)
- Leucauge malkini Chrysanthus, 1975 – Solomon Islands
- Leucauge mammilla Zhu, Song & Zhang, 2003 – China
- Leucauge margaritata (Thorell, 1899) – Cameroon
- Leucauge mariana (Taczanowski, 1881) – Mexico, Hispaniola to Peru
- Leucauge medjensis Lessert, 1930 – DR Congo, Tanzania, South Africa
- Leucauge melanoleuca (Mello-Leitão, 1944) – Brazil
- Leucauge mendanai Berland, 1933 – French Polynesia (Marquesas Is.)
- Leucauge meruensis Tullgren, 1910 – Tanzania
  - L. m. karagonis Strand, 1913 – Ruanda
- Leucauge mesomelas (O. Pickard-Cambridge, 1894) – Mexico
- Leucauge moerens (O. Pickard-Cambridge, 1896) – Mexico, Central America, Puerto Rico
- Leucauge moheliensis Schmidt & Krause, 1993 – Comoros
- Leucauge nagashimai Ono, 2011 – Japan
- Leucauge nanshan Zhu, Song & Zhang, 2003 – China (Hainan)
- Leucauge nicobarica (Thorell, 1891) – India (Nicobar Is.)
- Leucauge nigricauda Simon, 1903 – Guinea-Bissau, Equatorial Guinea
- Leucauge nigrocincta Simon, 1903 – West Africa, São Tomé and Príncipe, Equatorial Guinea (Bioko)
- Leucauge nigrotarsalis (Doleschall, 1859) – Indonesia (Ambon)
- Leucauge obscurella Strand, 1913 – Central Africa
- Leucauge opiparis Simon, 1907 – São Tomé and Príncipe
- Leucauge papuana Kulczyński, 1911 – New Guinea
- Leucauge paranensis (Mello-Leitão, 1937) – Brazil
- Leucauge parangscipinia Barrion & Litsinger, 1995 – Philippines
- Leucauge pinarensis (Franganillo, 1930) – Cuba
- Leucauge polita (Keyserling, 1893) – Mexico, Guatemala
- Leucauge popayanensis Strand, 1908 – Colombia
- Leucauge prodiga (L. Koch, 1872) – Samoa
- Leucauge pulcherrima (Keyserling, 1865) – Colombia, French Guiana
- Leucauge pusilla (Thorell, 1878) – Myanmar (Table Is.), Indonesia (Ambon)
- Leucauge quadrifasciata (Thorell, 1890) – Indonesia (Nias Is.), Malaysia
- Leucauge quadripenicillata (van Hasselt, 1893) – Indonesia (Sumatra)
- Leucauge regnyi (Simon, 1898) – Caribbean
- Leucauge reimoseri Strand, 1936 – Central Africa
- Leucauge roseosignata Mello-Leitão, 1943 – Brazil
- Leucauge rubripleura (Mello-Leitão, 1947) – Brazil
- Leucauge rubromaculata Benjamin, 2024 – Sri Lanka
- Leucauge rubrotrivittata Simon, 1906 – India
- Leucauge ruwenzorensis Strand, 1913 – Central Africa
- Leucauge sabahan Dzulhelmi, 2016 – Malaysia (Borneo)
- Leucauge saphes Chamberlin & Ivie, 1936 – Panama
- Leucauge sarawakensis (Dzulhelmi & Suriyanti, 2015) – Malaysia (Borneo), Brunei
- Leucauge scalaris (Thorell, 1890) – Indonesia (Sumatra)
- Leucauge semiventris Strand, 1908 – Colombia
- Leucauge senegalensis Roewer, 1961 – Senegal
- Leucauge severa (Keyserling, 1893) – Brazil
- Leucauge signiventris Strand, 1913 – Central Africa
- Leucauge simplex F. O. Pickard-Cambridge, 1903 – Mexico
- Leucauge soeensis Schenkel, 1944 – Timor
- Leucauge speciosissima (Keyserling, 1881) – Peru
- Leucauge spiculosa Bryant, 1940 – Cuba
- Leucauge splendens (Blackwall, 1863) – Brazil
- Leucauge stictopyga (Thorell, 1890) – Indonesia (Sumatra)
- Leucauge striatipes (Bradley, 1876) – Australia
- Leucauge subadulta Strand, 1906 – Japan
- Leucauge subblanda Bösenberg & Strand, 1906 – Russia (Far East), China, Korea, Taiwan, Japan
- Leucauge subgemmea Bösenberg & Strand, 1906 – Russia (Far East), China, Korea, Japan
- Leucauge superba (Thorell, 1890) – Indonesia (Nias Is., Sumatra)
- Leucauge synthetica Chamberlin & Ivie, 1936 – Panama
- Leucauge taczanowskii (Marx, 1893) – French Guiana
- Leucauge taiwanica Yoshida, 2009 – Taiwan
- Leucauge tanikawai Zhu, Song & Zhang, 2003 – China
- Leucauge tellervo Strand, 1913 – Central Africa
- Leucauge tengchongensis Wan & Peng, 2013 – China
- Leucauge tessellata (Thorell, 1887) – India to China, Thailand, Vietnam, Laos, Taiwan, Indonesia (Moluccas)
- Leucauge thomeensis Kraus, 1960 – São Tomé and Príncipe, Botswana, South Africa
- Leucauge tredecimguttata (Simon, 1877) – Philippines
- Leucauge trilineata (Mello-Leitão, 1940) – Brazil
- Leucauge tristicta (Thorell, 1891) – India (Nicobar Is.)
- Leucauge tupaqamaru Archer, 1971 – Peru
- Leucauge turbida (Keyserling, 1893) – Brazil
- Leucauge uberta (Keyserling, 1893) – Brazil
- Leucauge undulata (Vinson, 1863) – Ethiopia, East Africa, Madagascar, Mauritius (Rodriguez)
- Leucauge ungulata (Karsch, 1879) – West, East Africa, Equatorial Guinea (Bioko), São Tomé and Príncipe
- Leucauge venusta (Walckenaer, 1841) – Canada, United States
- Leucauge vibrabunda (Simon, 1896) – Indonesia (Java)
- Leucauge virginis (Strand, 1911) – Indonesia (Aru Is.)
- Leucauge viridecolorata Strand, 1916 – Jamaica
- Leucauge volupis (Keyserling, 1893) – Brazil, Paraguay, Argentina
- Leucauge wangi Zhu, Song & Zhang, 2003 – China
- Leucauge wokamara Strand, 1911 – Indonesia (Aru Is.)
- Leucauge wulingensis Song & Zhu, 1992 – China
- Leucauge xiaoen Zhu, Song & Zhang, 2003 – China
- Leucauge xiuying Zhu, Song & Zhang, 2003 – China, Laos
- Leucauge zizhong Zhu, Song & Zhang, 2003 – China, Laos

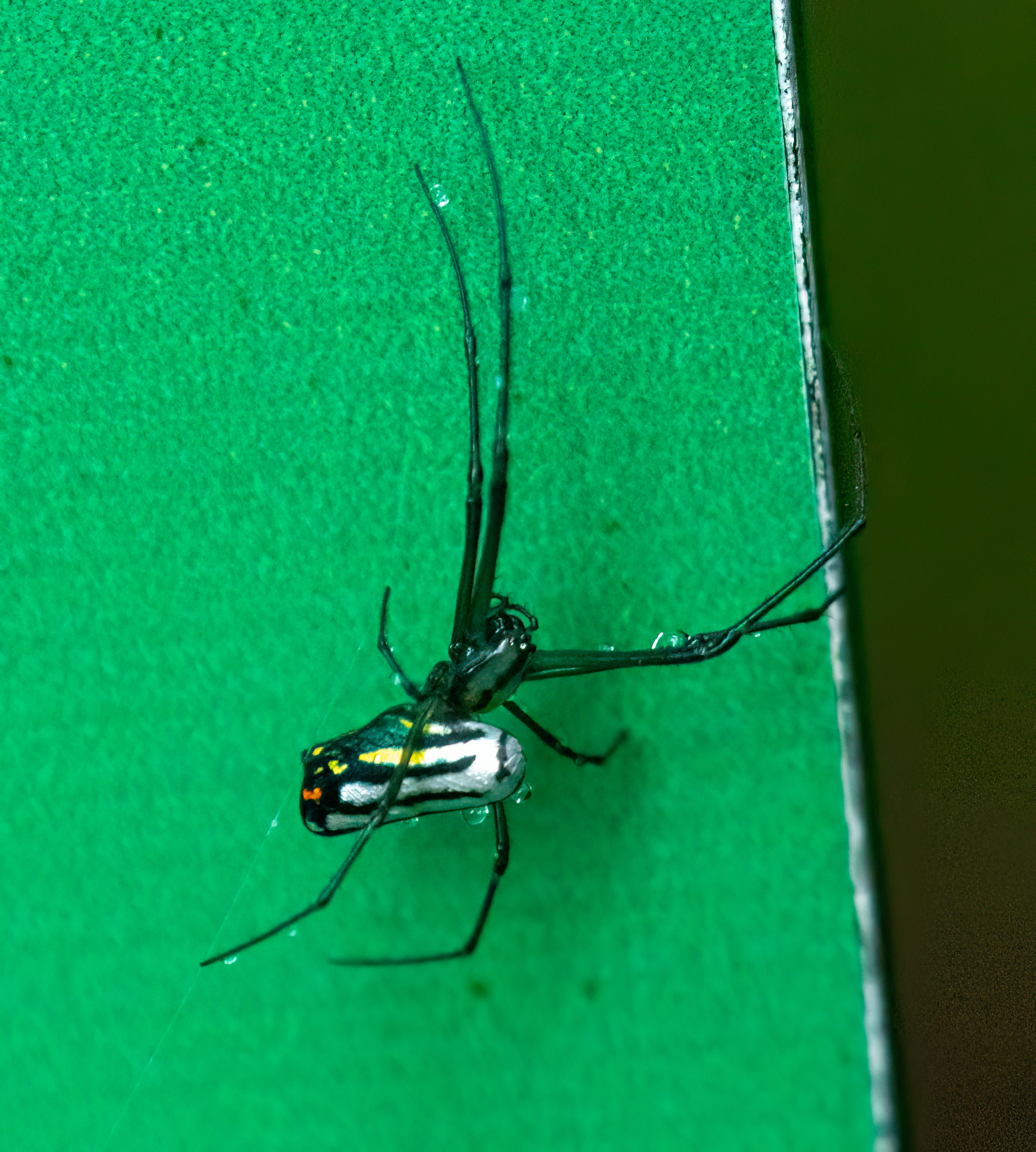
Leucauge argyra in Costa Rica

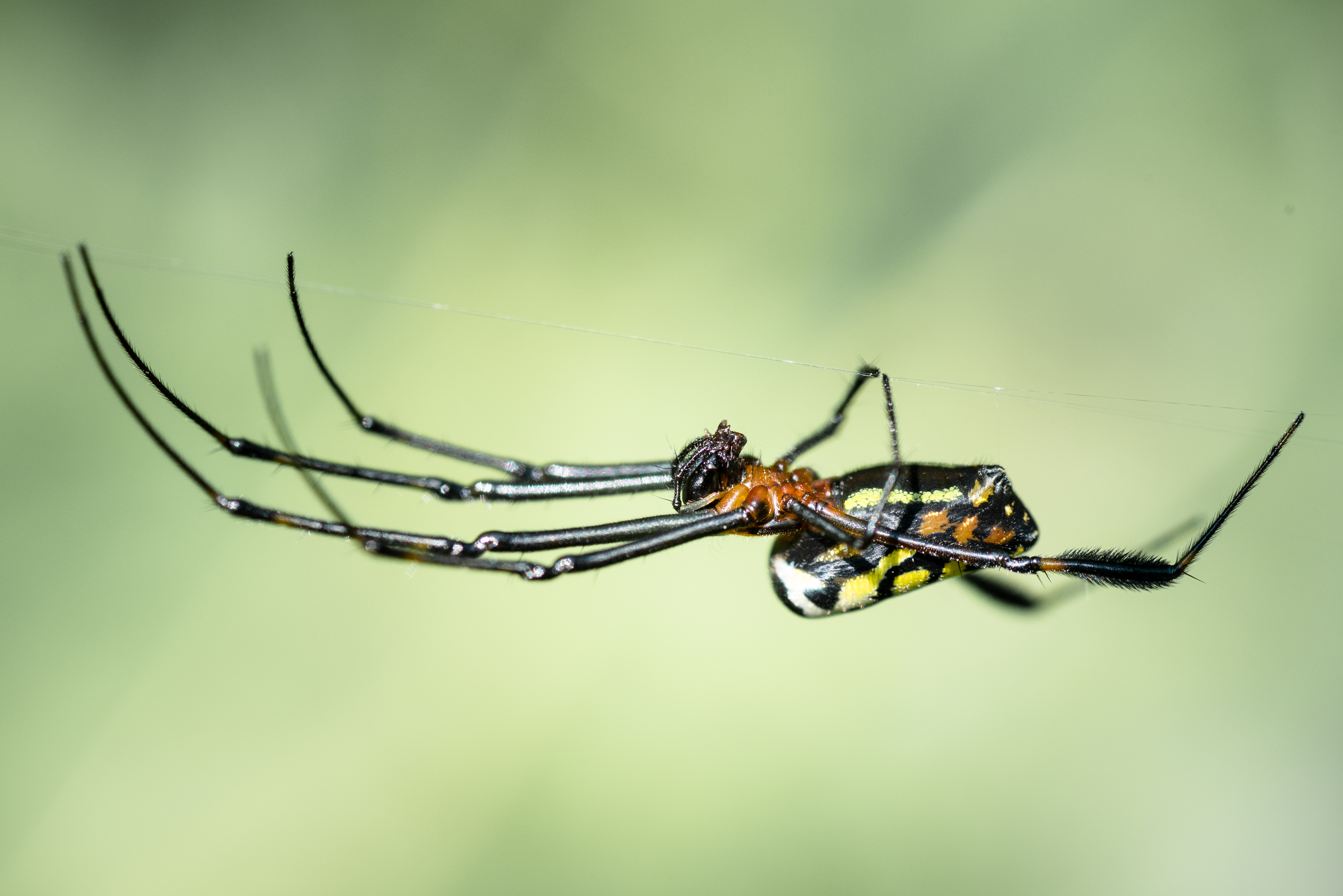
L. sp., Kaeng Krachan National Park, Thailand

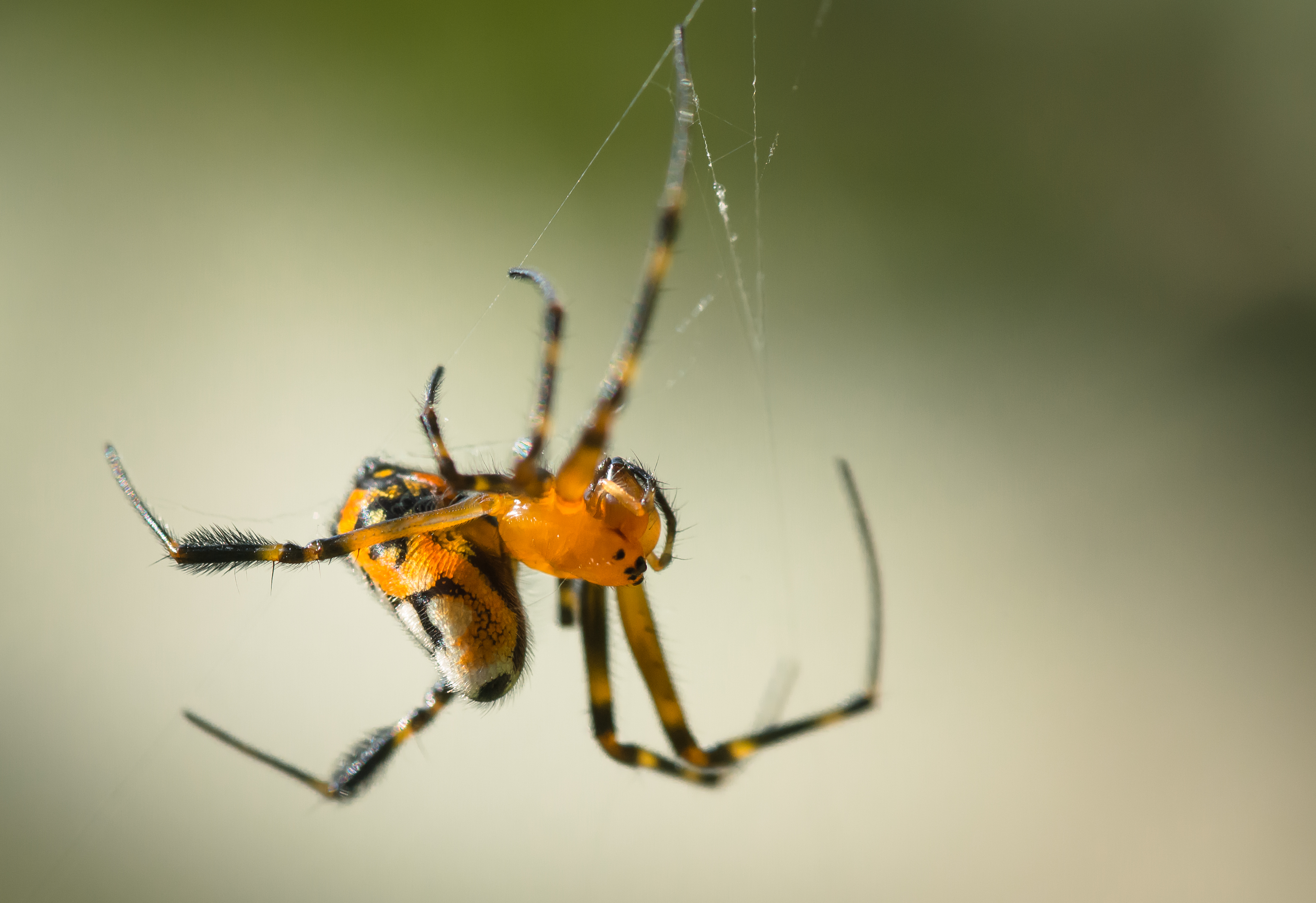
L. sp., Kaeng Krachan National Park, Thailand

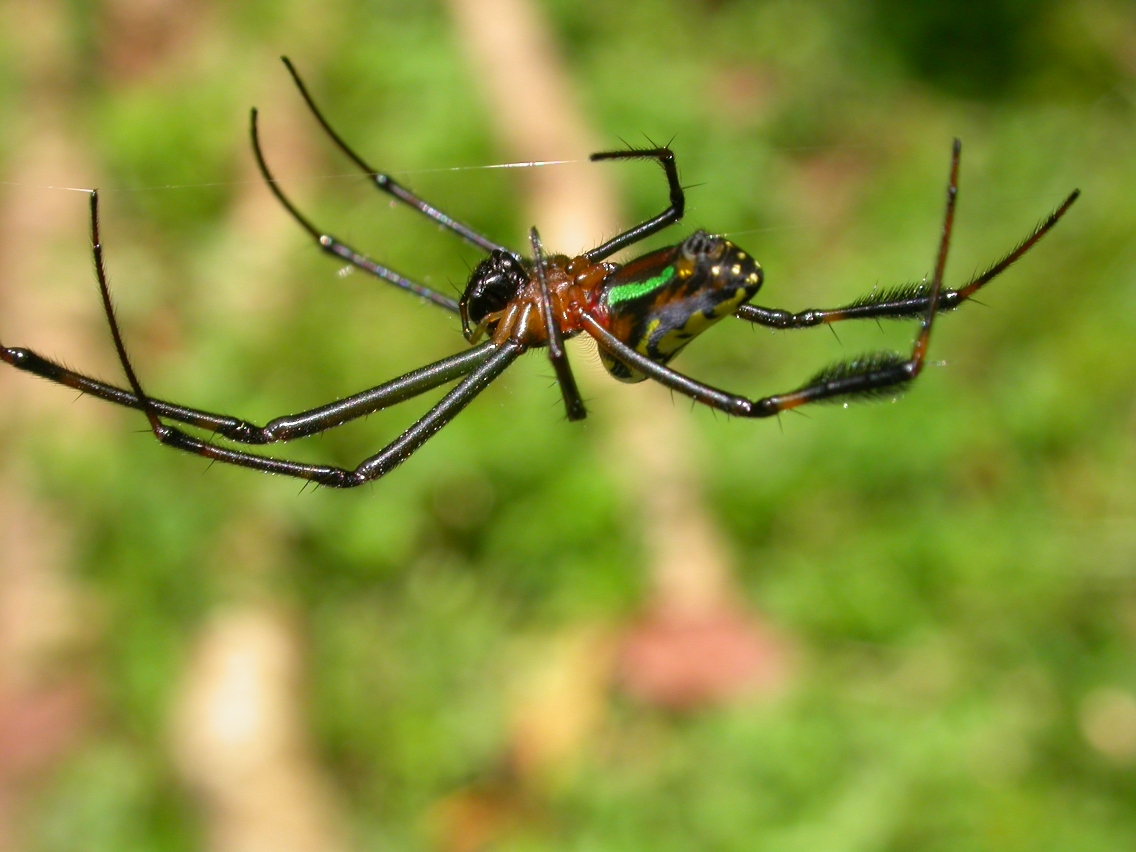
L. tessellata or related species

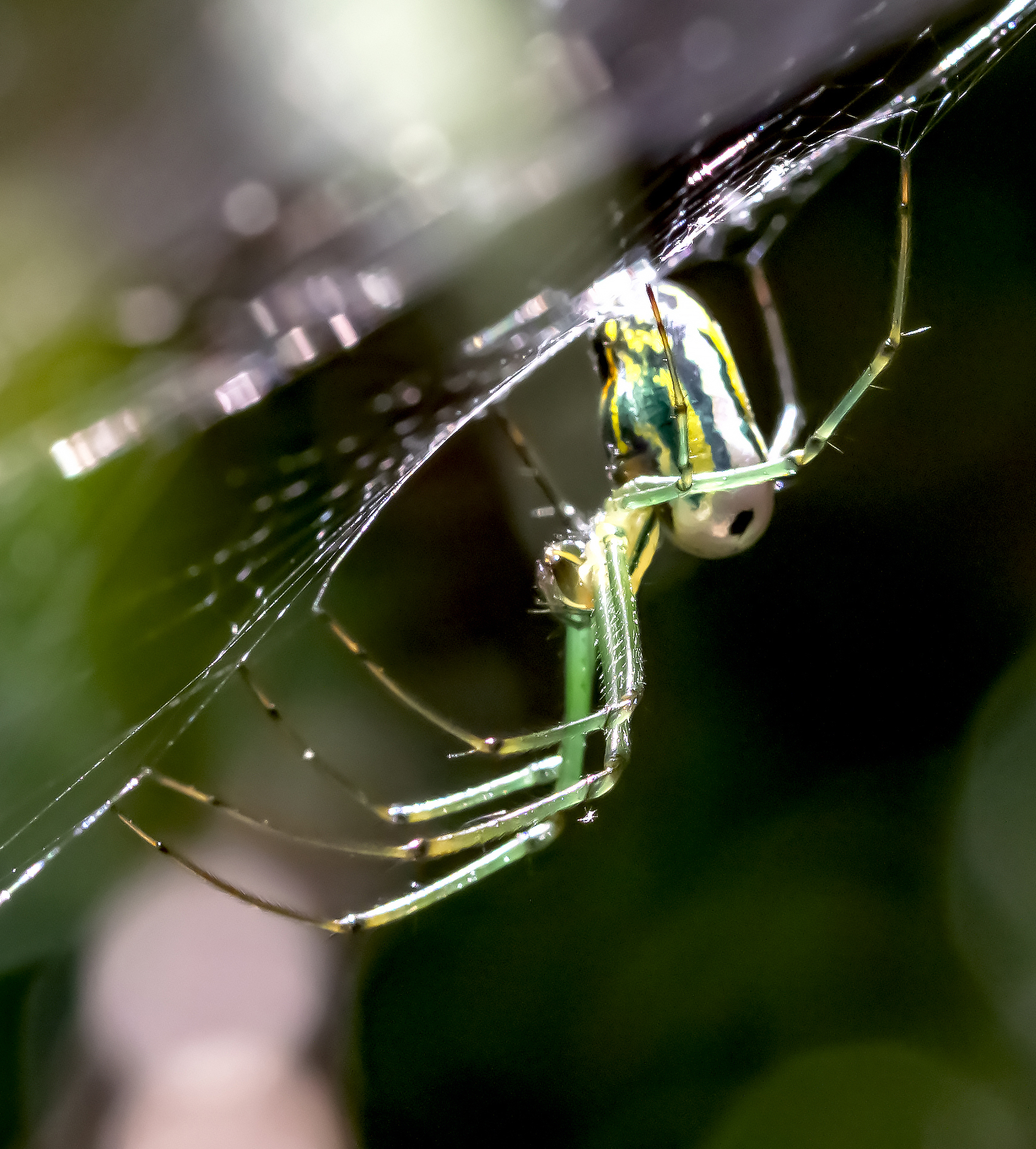
L venusta

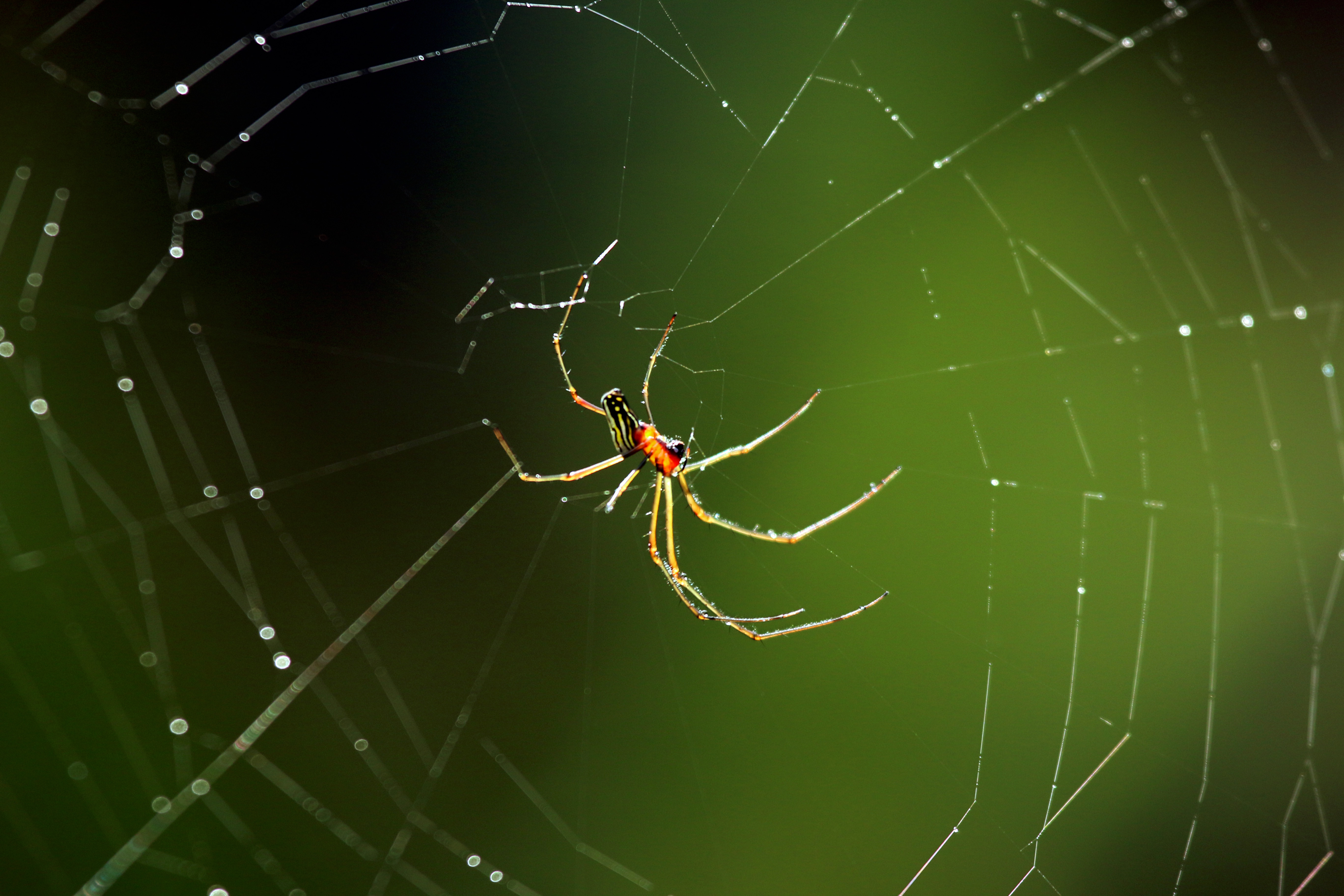
Mabel orchard spider, L. mabelae, Jamaica

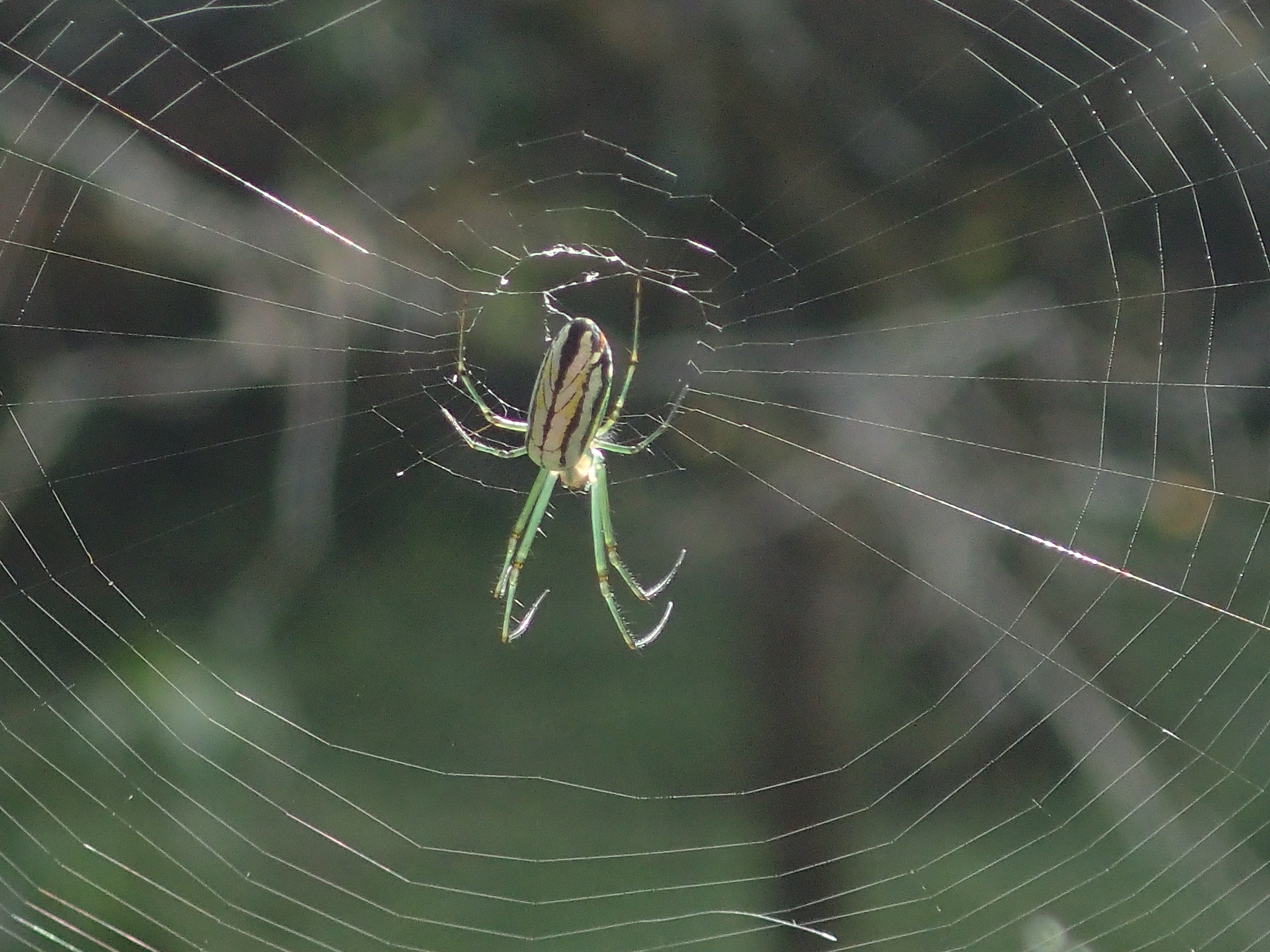
Dorsal view of a mature female Leucauge mariana
