= Leucauge thomeensis =

Thomeensis Silver Vlei Spider

Scientific classification
- Kingdom: Animalia
- Phylum: Arthropoda
- Subphylum: Chelicerata
- Class: Arachnida
- Order: Araneae
- Infraorder: Araneomorphae
- Family: Tetragnathidae
- Genus: Leucauge
- Species: L. thomeensis

Binomial name
- Leucauge thomeensis Kraus, 1960

Species of spider

Leucauge thomeensis is a species of spider in the family Tetragnathidae. a group commonly known as long-jawed orb-weavers due to their elongated chelicerae and web-building behavior. It is an African species native to southern Africa. It is commonly known as the thomeensis silver vlei spider.

== Distribution ==
Leucauge thomeensis is found in São Tomé and Príncipe, Botswana, and South Africa.

In South Africa, the species is recorded only from the Eastern Cape, specifically from Jeffrey's Bay, Thyspunt, Storms River, and Addo Elephant National Park.

== Habitat and ecology ==
The species makes orb-webs low in grass and has been sampled from the Fynbos and Thicket biomes.

== Description ==
Known only from males.

== Conservation ==
Leucauge thomeensis is listed as Least Concern by the South African National Biodiversity Institute. The species is protected in Addo Elephant National Park.

== Taxonomy ==
The species was originally described by Otto Kraus in 1960 from São Tomé. The presence of the species in southern Africa still needs to be confirmed.
