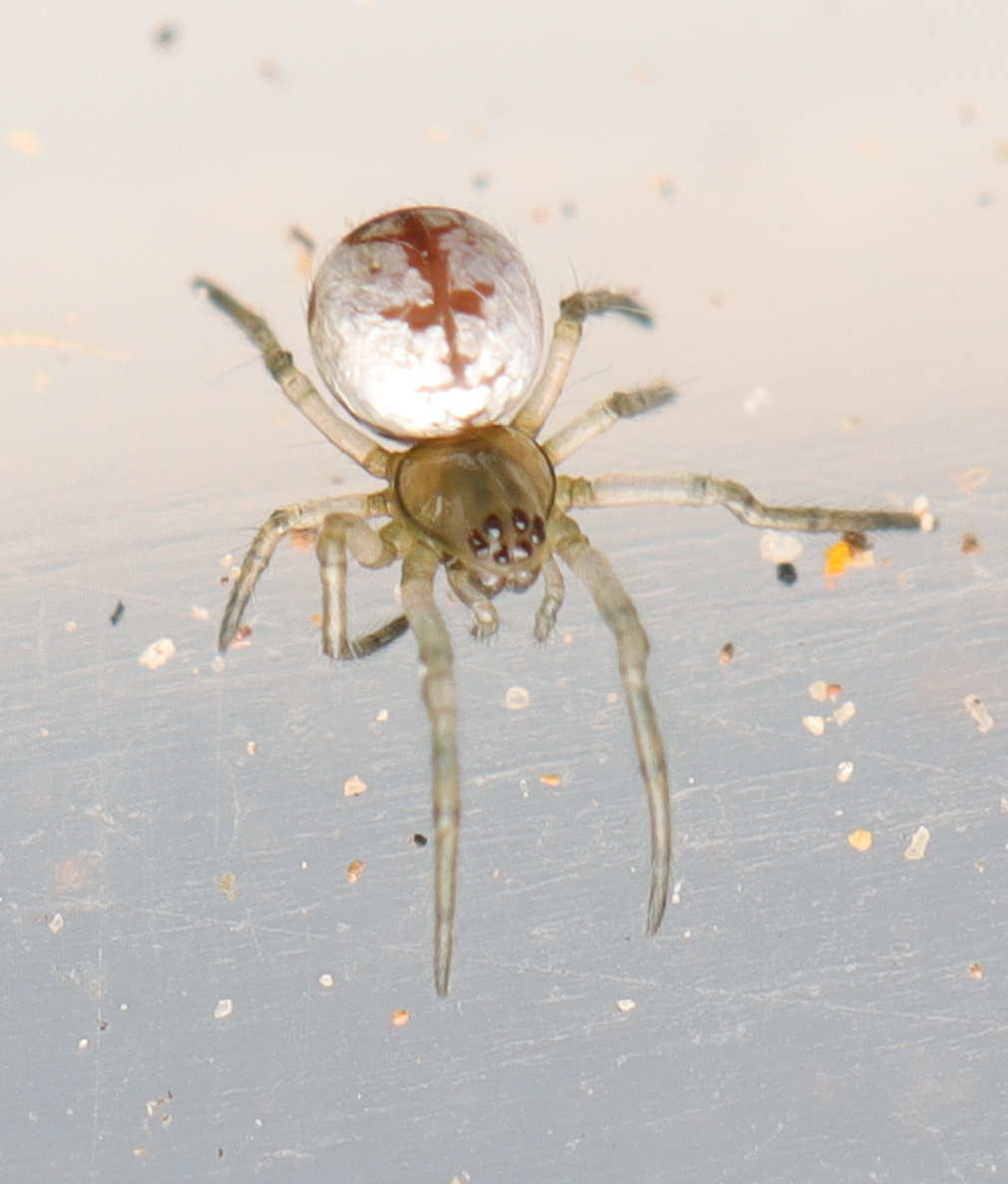

Scientific classification
- Kingdom: Animalia
- Phylum: Arthropoda
- Subphylum: Chelicerata
- Class: Arachnida
- Order: Araneae
- Infraorder: Araneomorphae
- Family: Tetragnathidae
- Genus: Leucauge
- Species: L. fishoekensis

Binomial name
- Leucauge fishoekensis Strand, 1909

= Leucauge fishoekensis =

Fishoek's Silver Vlei Spider

Species of spider

Leucauge fishoekensis is a species of spider in the family Tetragnathidae. It is endemic to South Africa and is commonly known as Fishoek's silver vlei spider.

== Distribution ==
Leucauge fishoekensis is known only from Fish Hoek in the Western Cape.

== Habitat and ecology ==
The species is an orb-web dweller sampled from the Fynbos biome at an altitude of 60 m. The species range is very small.

== Conservation ==
Leucauge fishoekensis is listed as Data Deficient by the South African National Biodiversity Institute for taxonomic reasons. Too little is known about the location, habitat and threats for an assessment to be made. Threats to the species are unknown.

== Taxonomy ==
The species was described by Embrik Strand in 1909 from Fish Hoek based on a juvenile specimen only 2 mm in length. The description is not illustrated. Strand stated that it is possibly only a juvenile of a known species.
