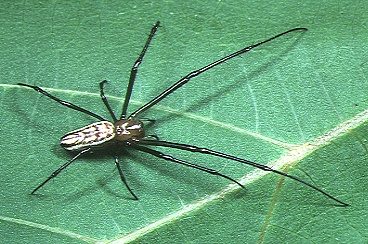

Scientific classification
- Kingdom: Animalia
- Phylum: Arthropoda
- Subphylum: Chelicerata
- Class: Arachnida
- Order: Araneae
- Infraorder: Araneomorphae
- Family: Tetragnathidae
- Genus: Leucauge
- Species: L. subblanda

Binomial name
- Leucauge subblanda (Walckenaer, 1842)

= Leucauge subblanda =

Species of spider

Leucauge subblanda is one of several species of orchard spider found in Russia (Far East), China, Korea, Taiwan, and Japan.
