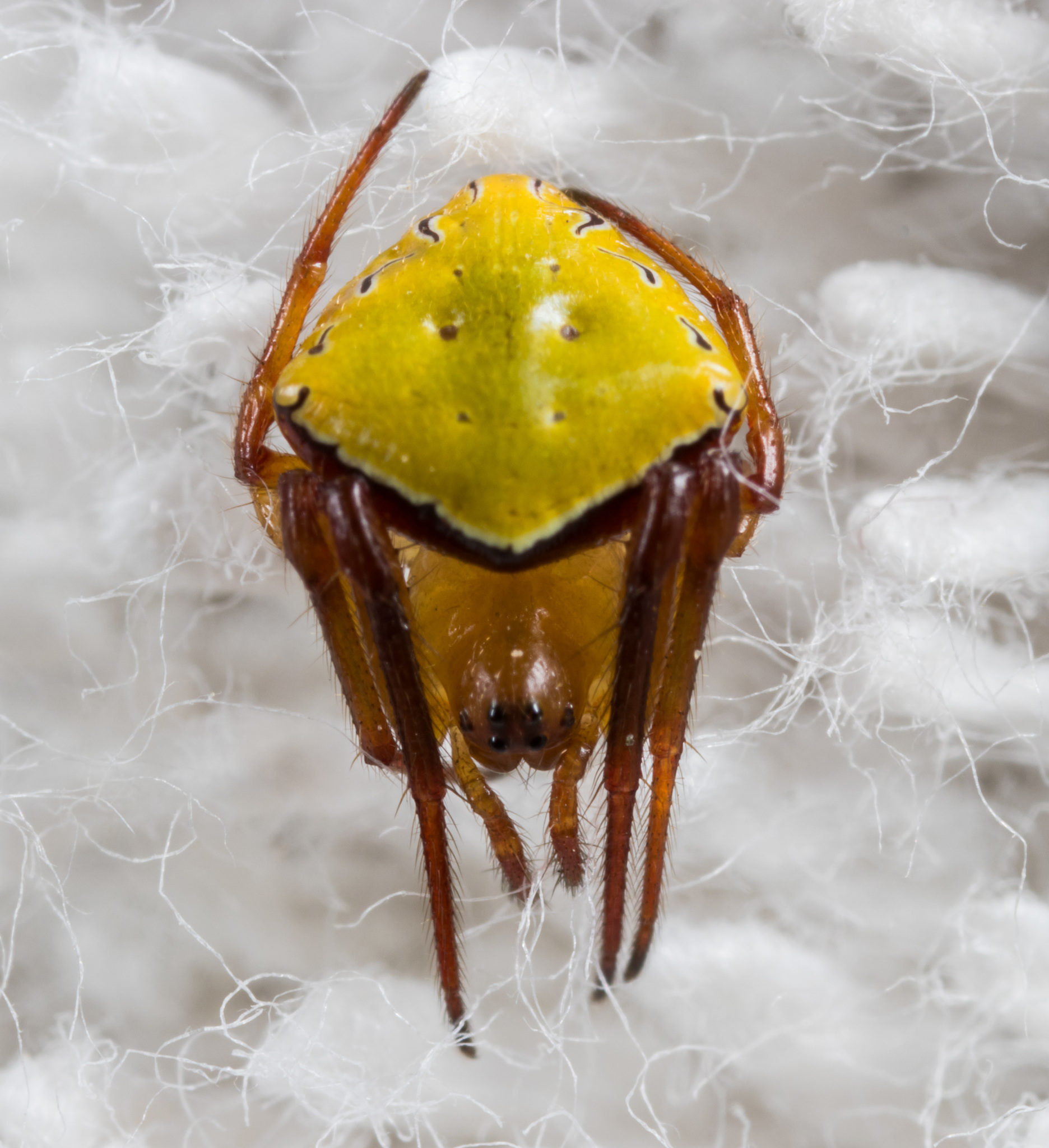
- female L. viridiventris

Scientific classification
- Kingdom: Animalia
- Phylum: Arthropoda
- Subphylum: Chelicerata
- Class: Arachnida
- Order: Araneae
- Infraorder: Araneomorphae
- Family: Araneidae
- Subfamily: Cyrtophorinae
- Genus: Leviaraneus; Tanikawa & Petcharad, 2023

Type species
- Leviaraneus viridiventris (Yaginuma, 1969)

Diversity
- 3 species

= Leviaraneus =

Genus of spiders

Leviaraneus is a genus of orb-weaver spiders in the family Araneidae. The genus was established in 2023 by Akio Tanikawa and Booppa Petcharad based on molecular phylogenetic analysis and morphological characters that distinguish these species from the genus Araneus. The genus is distributed across Asia, with species found in Japan, China, Taiwan, India, and Thailand, as well as Indonesia and Australia.

== Etymology ==
The generic name Leviaraneus is coined from the surname "Levi" and Araneus, honoring the late Dr. Herbert W. Levi for his contributions to spider taxonomy.

== Description ==
Leviaraneus spiders are small orb-weavers characterized by their broad, often green opisthosoma. The genus can be distinguished from related genera by several morphological features.

Key diagnostic features include the female abdomen being as long as wide or slightly wider than long, versus longer than wide in Aoaraneus and Bijoaraneus. Males have a single macroseta on the palpal patella, compared to two in related genera. The embolus is filiform, long, and S-shaped, contrasting with the short and stout embolus in Aoaraneus and Bijoaraneus. Unlike these related genera, Leviaraneus males lack a ventral hook on coxa I and a dorsal groove on femur II.

The male cephalothorax is longer than wide with the thoracic part surrounded by setae. The median fovea forms an I-shaped longitudinal line. Males possess distinctive palpal features including a basal tubercle on the femur, a single macroseta on the tibia, and a filiform embolus wrapped by the conductor. The male endite bears a lateral tooth, and coxa I has a prolateral tubercle.

Females have a broader abdomen and an epigyne that either lacks a scape or has a tongue-shaped scape.

== Phylogeny ==
Molecular phylogenetic analysis using five genes revealed that Leviaraneus forms a well-supported monophyletic clade distinct from Araneus. The genus is sister to a clade containing Aoaraneus and Bijoaraneus, with Eriovixia being sister to this larger group. These results confirmed that the species previously placed in Araneus belonged to a separate evolutionary lineage requiring generic recognition.

== Distribution and habitat ==
The genus is distributed across Asia, with species recorded from Japan, China, Taiwan, India, and Thailand, as well as Indonesia and Australia. The spiders construct typical orb webs and are found in various terrestrial habitats across their range.

== Species ==
As of November 2026, the genus contains three species:

- Leviaraneus halabala Tanikawa & Petcharad, 2023 – Thailand
- Leviaraneus noegeatus (Thorell, 1895) – India, China, Thailand
- Leviaraneus viridiventris (Yaginuma, 1969) – India, China, Taiwan, Japan (type species)
