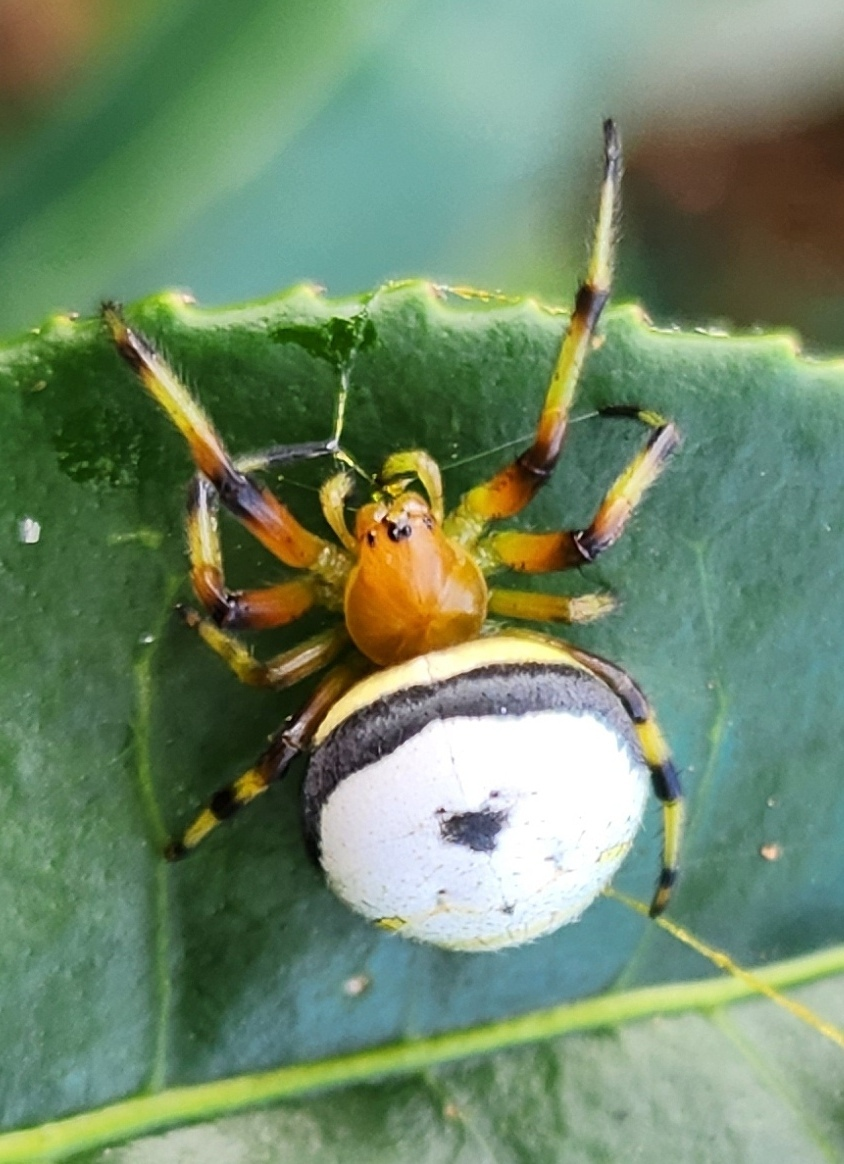
- female from Taiwan

Scientific classification
- Kingdom: Animalia
- Phylum: Arthropoda
- Subphylum: Chelicerata
- Class: Arachnida
- Order: Araneae
- Infraorder: Araneomorphae
- Family: Araneidae
- Genus: Bijoaraneus
- Species: B. komachi

Binomial name
- Bijoaraneus komachi Tanikawa, Yamasaki & Petcharad, 2021

Synonyms
- Aranea mitifica Bösenberg & Strand, 1906; Araneus mitificus Saito, 1939; Afraranea mitifica Yaginuma & Archer, 1959

= Bijoaraneus komachi =

Species of spider

Bijoaraneus komachi is a species of orb-weaver spider in the genus Bijoaraneus. It is endemic to Japan and Korea. The species was described in 2021 and had previously been misidentified as Bijoaraneus mitificus by many authors.

== Etymology ==
The specific epithet komachi is derived from the Japanese word "komachi" meaning "a beautiful lady".

== Distribution ==
B. komachi has been recorded from Japan (including Honshu and Kyushu) and Korea. Specimens have been collected from various Japanese prefectures including Ibaraki, Chiba, Tokyo, Kanagawa, Shizuoka, and Aichi.

== Description ==
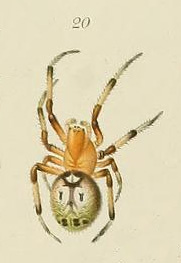
Drawing of female from Bösenberg & Strand (1906)

Bijoaraneus komachi is a medium-sized orb-weaver spider that exhibits sexual dimorphism. Females are larger than males, with body lengths ranging from 7.70 to 11.60 mm, while males measure 5.60-6.50 mm in body length.

When alive, the carapace is greenish orange in color. The opisthosoma is whitish green dorsally with black markings and green ventrally. The legs are greenish orange with dark annulation, and the sternum is green.

The species can be distinguished from the closely related B. mitificus by several characteristics. In females, the epigyne appears snowman-shaped in posterior view, contrasting with the inverted triangular appearance of B. mitificus. In males, the median apophysis of the palpal organ is vertically elongated in prolateral view, and the embolus is straight, unlike the horizontally elongated median apophysis and apically bent embolus of B. mitificus.
