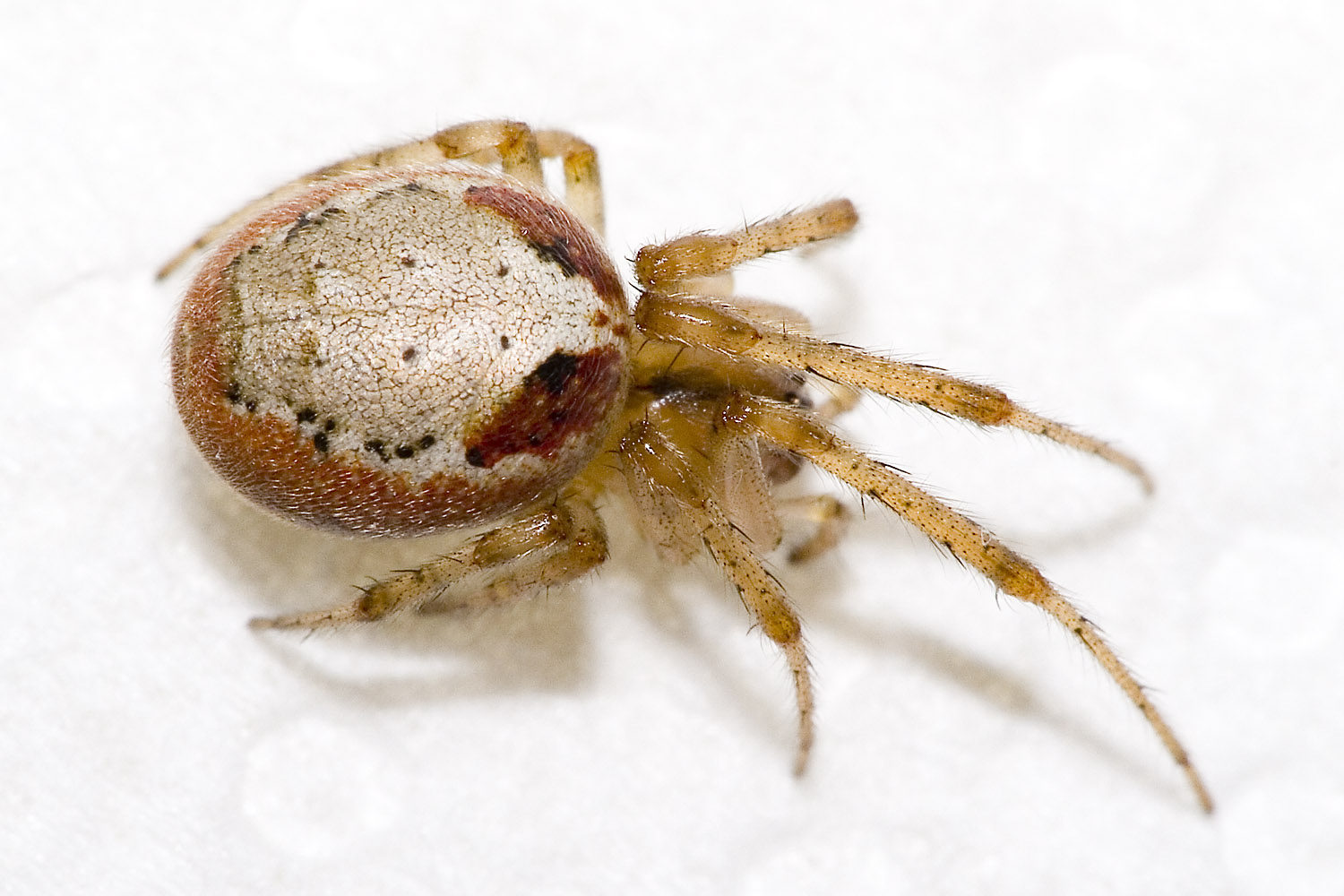

Scientific classification
- Kingdom: Animalia
- Phylum: Arthropoda
- Subphylum: Chelicerata
- Class: Arachnida
- Order: Araneae
- Infraorder: Araneomorphae
- Family: Araneidae
- Genus: Zygiella
- Species: Z. atrica

Binomial name
- Zygiella atrica (C. L. Koch), 1845
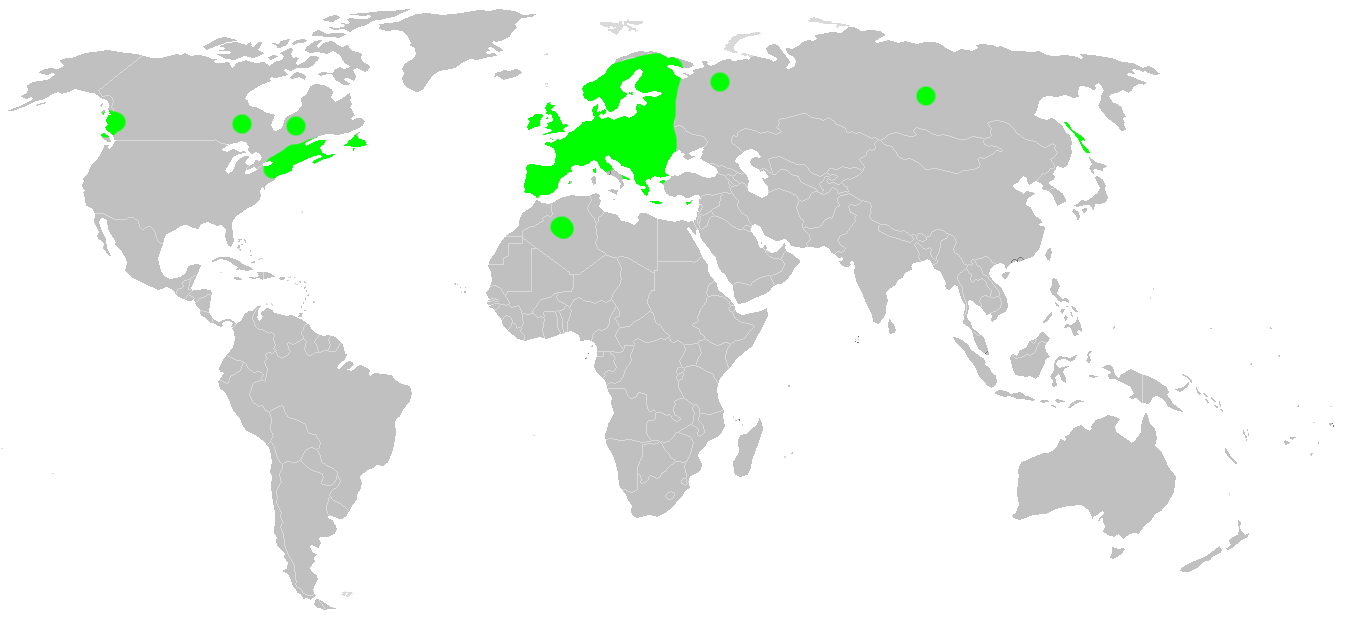

= Zygiella atrica =

Species of spider

Zygiella atrica is a species of spider.

Like other Zygiella species, it builds an orb web with two missing sectors, and a signalling thread in the center of those, leading to its hideout, whereas young spiders build a complete web.

Unlike Z. x-notata, this spider is found away from houses, on bushes and rocky sites away from human habitation. It is also more brown. Its eggs are lethal to mice.
