= Zygiella dispar =

Scientific classification
- Domain: Eukaryota
- Kingdom: Animalia
- Phylum: Arthropoda
- Subphylum: Chelicerata
- Class: Arachnida
- Order: Araneae
- Infraorder: Araneomorphae
- Family: Araneidae
- Genus: Zygiella
- Species: Z. dispar

Binomial name
- Zygiella dispar (Kulczyński, 1885)

Species of spider

Zygiella dispar is a species of orb weaver in the family of spiders known as Araneidae.

In 2015, the genus Parazygiella was determined to be a taxonomic synonym of Zygiella, so Parazygiella dispar and the other species of Parazygiella were moved to the genus Zygiella.
