= Bijoaraneus postilena =

Scientific classification
- Kingdom: Animalia
- Phylum: Arthropoda
- Subphylum: Chelicerata
- Class: Arachnida
- Order: Araneae
- Infraorder: Araneomorphae
- Family: Araneidae
- Genus: Bijoaraneus
- Species: B. postilena

Binomial name
- Bijoaraneus postilena (Thorell, 1878)

Synonyms
- Epeira postilena Thorell, 1878; Araneus postilena (Thorell, 1878)

Species of spider

Bijoaraneus postilena is a species of spider in the family Araneidae (orb weavers). It is found in Thailand and Indonesia (including Sumatra, Java, and Ambon) as well as New Guinea.

The species name postilena was given by Thorell without explanation of its etymology.

== Taxonomy ==
The species was originally described by Tamerlan Thorell in 1878 as Epeira postilena based on specimens from Ambon Island. It was later transferred to the genus Araneus by Eugène Simon in 1895, before being moved to the newly established genus Bijoaraneus by Tanikawa, Yamasaki & Petcharad in 2021.

== Distribution ==
B. postilena has been recorded from Thailand and Indonesia. In Thailand, specimens have been collected from multiple provinces including Ubon Ratchathani, Sa Kaeo, Prachin Buri, Trang, and Songkhla. The species is also known from several Indonesian islands including Sumatra, Java, and Ambon, as well as New Guinea.

== Description ==
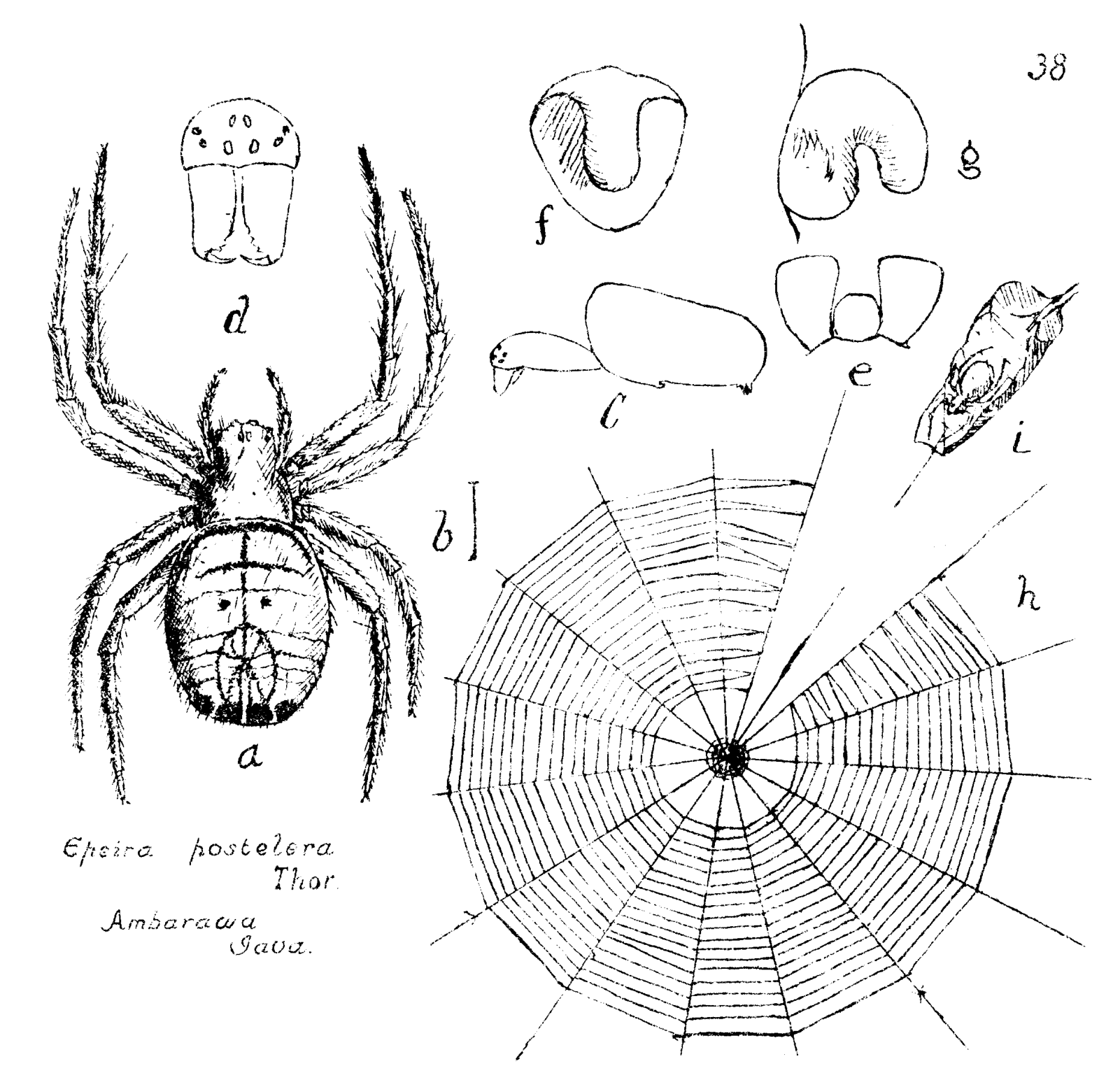
Drawings of spider and web from Workman (1896)

The female has a body length of approximately 5.1 mm, while males are smaller at about 3.6 mm. The cephalothorax is about 2.0 mm long and 1.7 mm wide in females, and 1.8 mm long and 1.45 mm wide in males.

In life, the spider displays striking coloration with a greenish orange cephalothorax and legs that show weak banding patterns. The opisthosoma is whitish green dorsally with distinctive black markings, while the ventral surface is green. This coloration likely provides camouflage when the spider rests among foliage.

The female can be distinguished from related species by the inverted triangular shape of the epigynal scape when viewed ventrally. Males are characterized by a sideways-protruding median apophysis on the palpal bulb, which differs from the shorter, non-protruding apophyses of closely related species.

== Behavior and ecology ==
B. postilena constructs a distinctive web behavior described by early observers. The spider builds a perpendicular snare approximately 3 in (76 mm) in diameter with a free segment and a trap line leading to a nest constructed in a twisted leaf about 1.5 in (38 mm) long, which is bound together with silk. The spider typically sits in the nest with its back facing downwards, holding onto the threads of the web structure.
