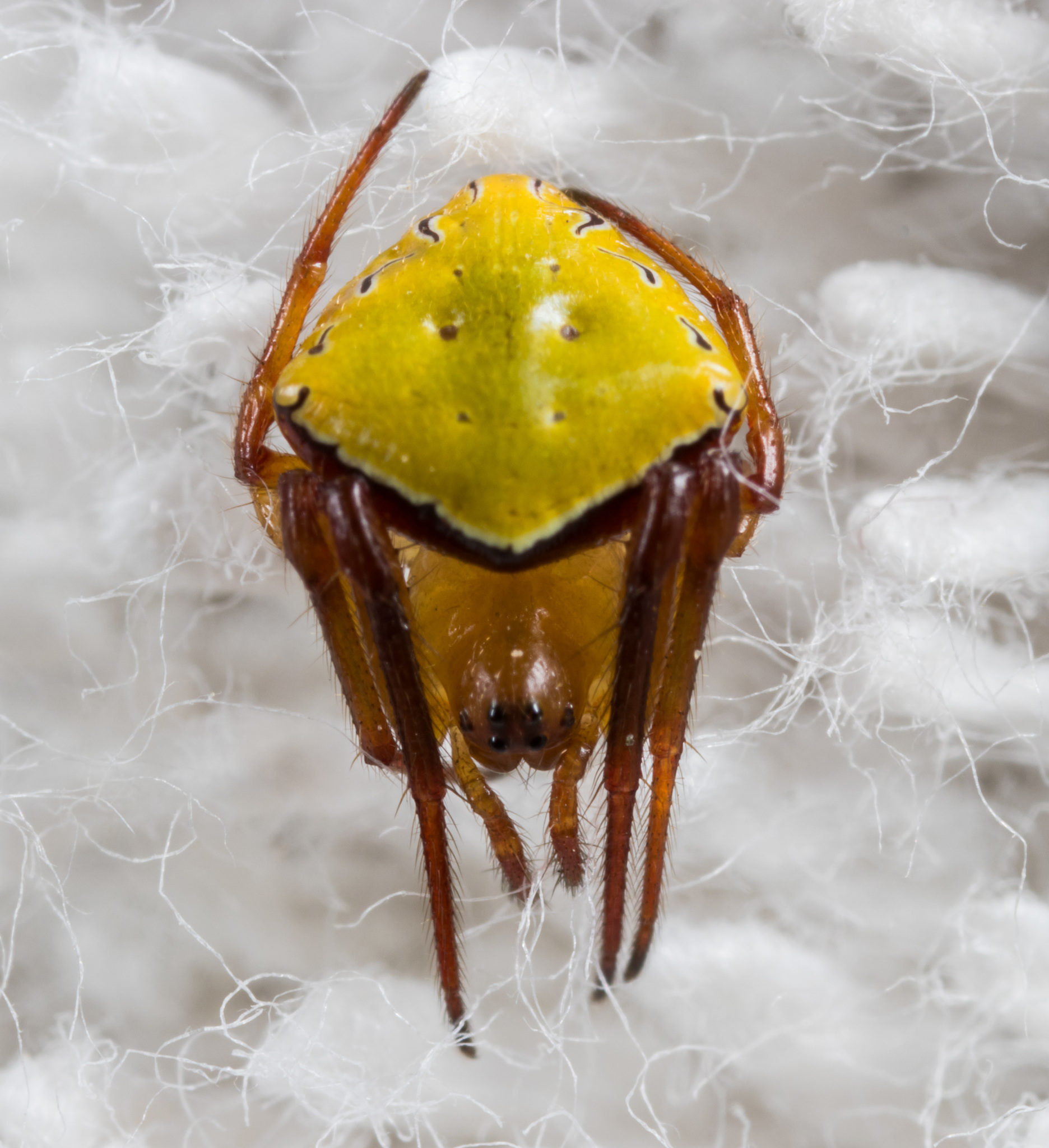
- female from Hong Kong

Scientific classification
- Kingdom: Animalia
- Phylum: Arthropoda
- Subphylum: Chelicerata
- Class: Arachnida
- Order: Araneae
- Infraorder: Araneomorphae
- Family: Araneidae
- Genus: Leviaraneus
- Species: L. viridiventris

Binomial name
- Leviaraneus viridiventris (Yaginuma, 1969)

Synonyms
- Araneus viridiventris Yaginuma, 1969

= Leviaraneus viridiventris =

Species of spider

Leviaraneus viridiventris is a species of orb-weaver spider in the genus Leviaraneus. It was originally described as Araneus viridiventris by Takeo Yaginuma in 1969, and was transferred to the newly established genus Leviaraneus in 2023 following molecular phylogenetic analysis.

The species is distributed across East and South Asia, including Japan, China, Taiwan, and India.

== Taxonomy ==
The species was originally described by Takeo Yaginuma in 1969 as Araneus viridiventris based on specimens from the Goto Islands in Nagasaki Prefecture, Japan. In 2023, Akio Tanikawa and Booppa Petcharad established the new genus Leviaraneus and transferred this species to it based on morphological differences from the type species of Araneus and molecular phylogenetic analysis using five gene sequences.

== Distribution ==
L. viridiventris has been recorded from Japan (including the main islands and Okinawa), China, Taiwan, and India. In Japan, it has been found from Tokyo to Kagoshima Prefecture and the Ryukyu Islands.

== Description ==
L. viridiventris is a small orb-weaver spider with distinctive green coloration. Males have a body length of 3.08–3.44 mm, while females are larger at 3.88–5.44 mm.

The cephalothorax is brown and pear-shaped, slightly longer than wide. The opisthosoma is uniformly yellowish green without markings, which distinguishes it from the closely related L. noegeatus. In living specimens, the abdomen appears fresh green, though this fades to grayish white in preserved specimens.

Males can be distinguished by their pedipalp structure, which has a single long bristle (macroseta) on the patella, and an elongated, S-shaped embolus that is wrapped by the conductor. Females lack a scape on the epigyne, and the spermathecae are almost touching.

== Habitat ==
The species constructs typical orb webs and has been observed making large horizontal orb webs.
