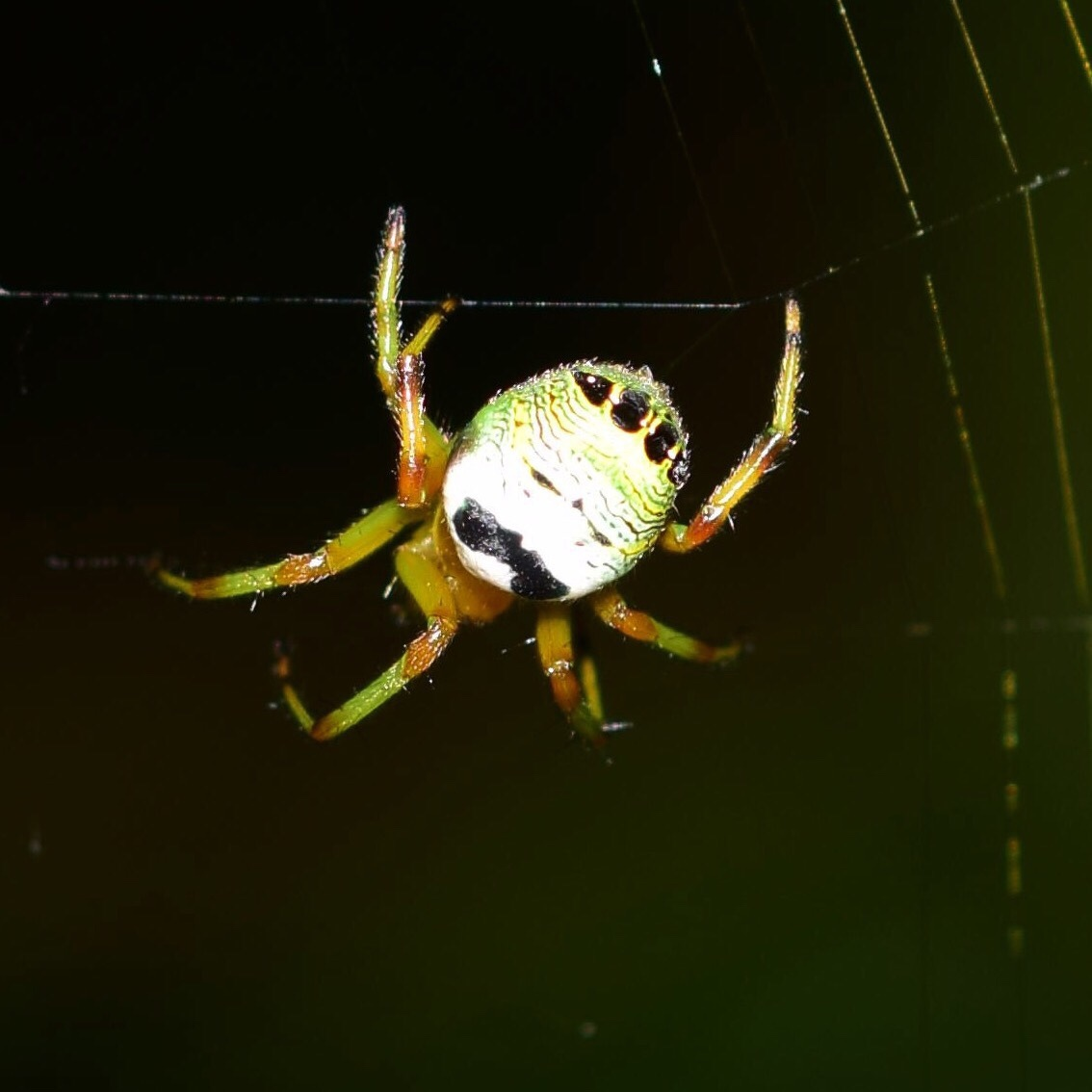
- female from South Africa

Scientific classification
- Kingdom: Animalia
- Phylum: Arthropoda
- Subphylum: Chelicerata
- Class: Arachnida
- Order: Araneae
- Infraorder: Araneomorphae
- Family: Araneidae
- Genus: Bijoaraneus
- Species: B. legonensis

Binomial name
- Bijoaraneus legonensis (Grasshoff & Edmunds, 1979)

Synonyms
- Araneus legonensis Grasshoff & Edmunds, 1979

= Bijoaraneus legonensis =

Bum-eyed Spider

Species of spider

Bijoaraneus legonensis is a species of orb-weaver spider in the family Araneidae. It is found in Ghana, South Africa, and Thailand.

== Distribution ==
B. legonensis has been recorded from Ghana (the type locality), South Africa, and Thailand. Despite the considerable geographic distance between Ghana and Thailand, the species shows only slight morphological variation that may represent geographical variation rather than distinct populations.

== Habitat and ecology ==
This species constructs a free sector web.

== Etymology ==
The species name legonensis refers to Legon, Ghana, where the University of Ghana is located and where the original specimens were collected.

== Taxonomy ==
B. legonensis was originally described as Araneus legonensis by Manfred Grasshoff and J. Edmunds in 1979. The species was transferred to the newly established genus Bijoaraneus in 2021 by Tanikawa, Yamasaki & Petcharad.

== Description ==
B. legonensis exhibits typical characteristics of the genus Bijoaraneus. Based on specimens from Thailand, females measure 6.40 mm in body length while males are smaller at 3.64 mm. The cephalothorax is 2.64 mm long and 2.20 mm wide in females, compared to 2.05 mm long and 1.70 mm wide in males.

Living specimens display a distinctive coloration: the carapace is brown with a green tint, the abdomen varies from pale white dorsally to bottle green ventrally, and is decorated with four dark spots on the posterior edge of the abdomen. When threatened, the spider tilts its abdomen upwards, showing the row of dark spots.{cn}

The species can be distinguished from the closely related B. mitificus by several morphological features. The epigyne has both sides almost parallel in ventral and posterior view, unlike the double-humped, heart-shaped appearance in B. mitificus. The male pedipalp has a median apophysis that appears as an inverted triangle in prolateral view.
