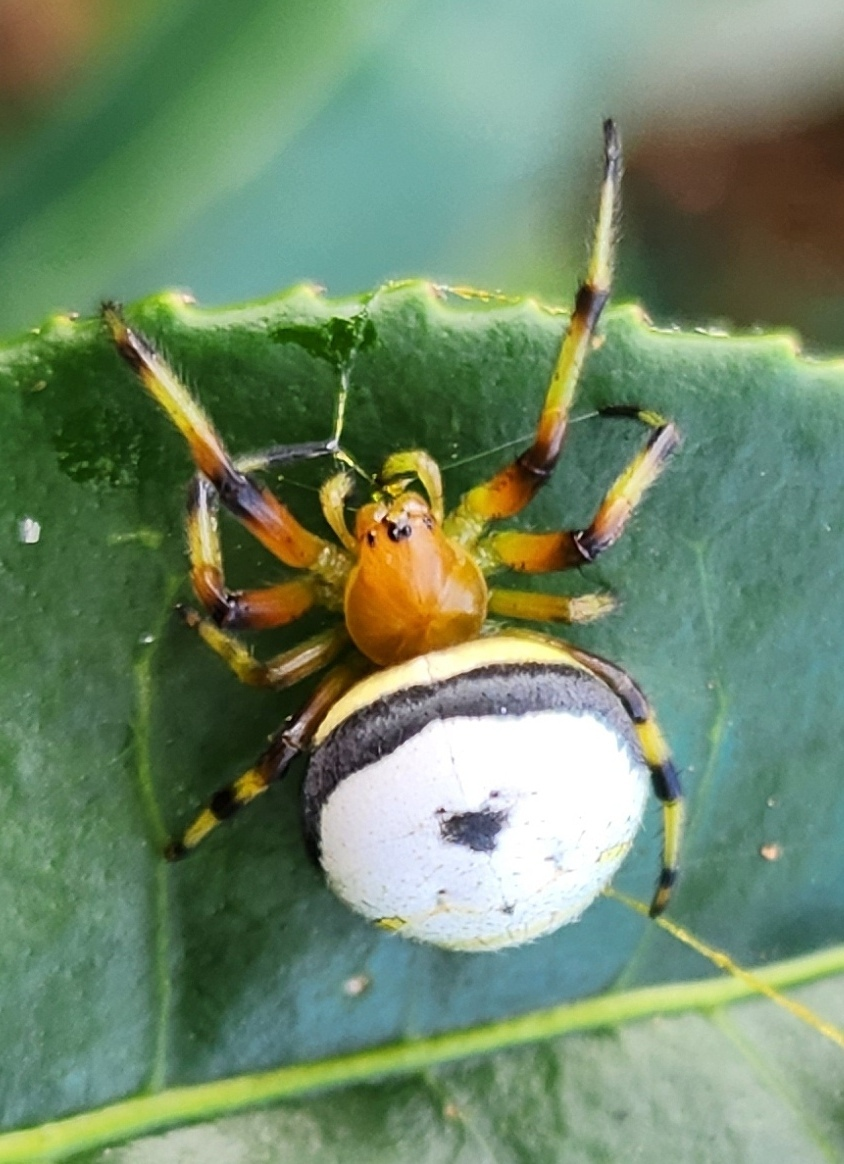
- B. komachi from Taiwan

Scientific classification
- Kingdom: Animalia
- Phylum: Arthropoda
- Subphylum: Chelicerata
- Class: Arachnida
- Order: Araneae
- Infraorder: Araneomorphae
- Family: Araneidae
- Genus: Bijoaraneus; Tanikawa, Yamasaki & Petcharad, 2021

Type species
- Epeira mitifica Simon, 1886

Species
- Bijoaraneus komachi; Bijoaraneus legonensis; Bijoaraneus mitificus; Bijoaraneus postilena; Bijoaraneus praesignis

= Bijoaraneus =

Genus of orb-weaver spiders

Bijoaraneus is a genus of orb-weaver spiders in the family Araneidae. The genus was established in 2021 by Tanikawa, Yamasaki & Petcharad when they recognized that several species previously placed in Araneus formed a distinct evolutionary lineage. As of September 2025, it contained five species distributed across Asia, Africa, and Australia.

== Etymology ==
The genus name Bijoaraneus is derived from the Japanese word 美女 "bijo" meaning "beautiful lady" combined with Araneus.

== Description ==
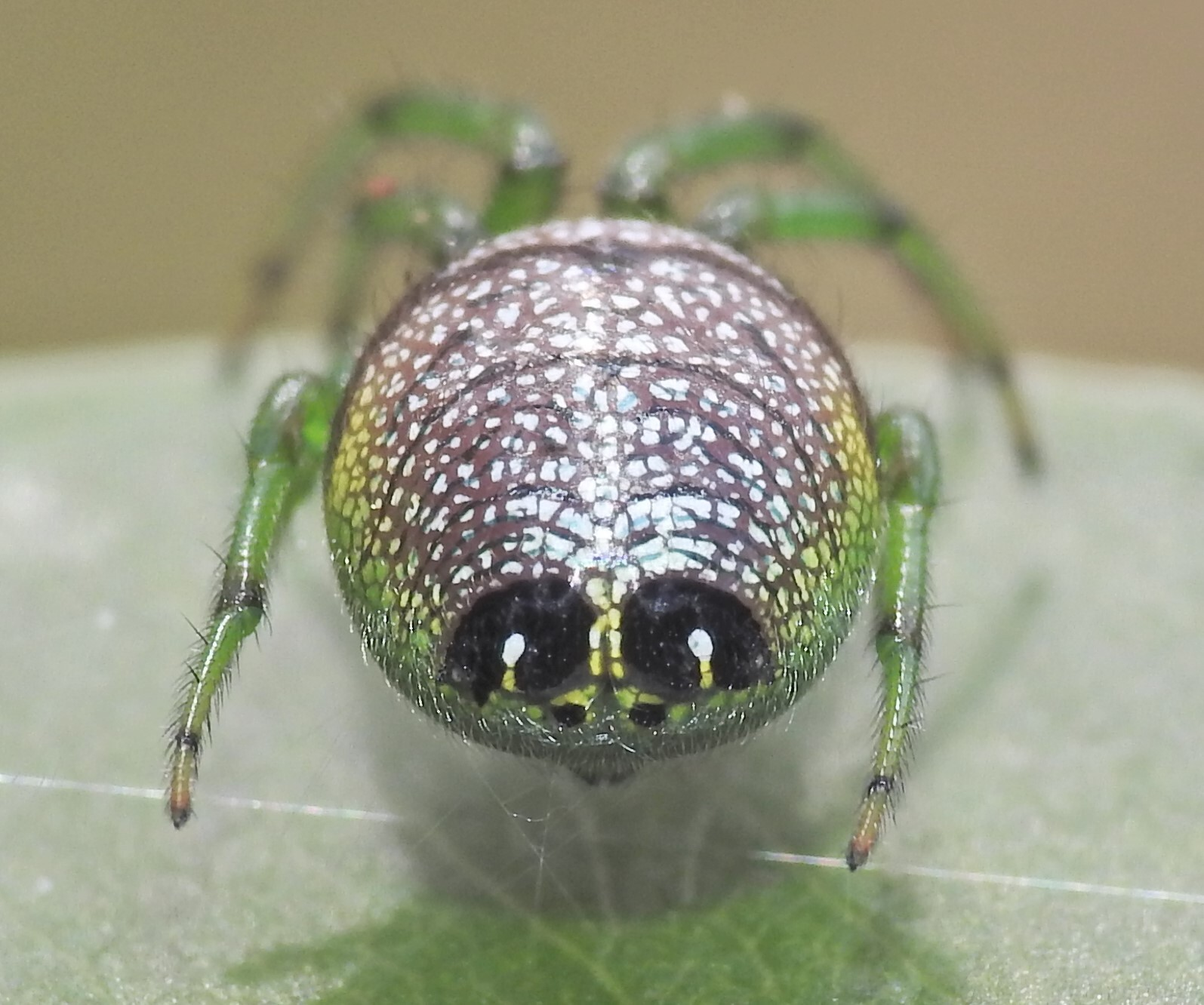
B. praesignis from behind

Bijoaraneus spiders share several distinctive characteristics that distinguish them from other orb-weavers. The median ocular area is wider anteriorly than posteriorly. In males, the palpal femur has a basal tubercle and the tibia bears two macrosetae. Males also possess a lateral tooth on the endite, a ventral hook on coxa I along with a dorsal tubercle, and femur II has both a groove and a row of ventral spines.

The opisthosoma is oval-shaped and longer than wide. Females have distinctive epigynes with short, well-sclerotized, inflexible scapes, without differentiation between the median plate and lateral lamella. Male palps lack a terminal apophysis, or when present, it is small and does not reach the conductor.

== Behavior ==
Like many orb-weavers, Bijoaraneus species construct circular webs, but with a distinctive missing sector - a free zone where no spiral threads are present. The silk is yellow in color. These spiders build their webs with a signal line that leads to a retreat constructed from a living leaf bound with silk, where the spider waits to detect prey. When prey becomes entangled in the web, vibrations travel along the signal line to alert the spider, which then rushes out to capture the prey.

== Distribution and habitat ==
The genus has a broad distribution across the Old World. Species are found in Asia (including Japan, Korea, China, India, Thailand, and the Philippines), parts of Africa (Ghana and South Africa), and Australia. They typically inhabit gardens, forests, and areas with abundant vegetation where they can build their webs and find suitable retreat sites among leaves.

== Species ==
As of November 2026, the genus contains five recognized species:

- Bijoaraneus komachi Tanikawa, Yamasaki & Petcharad, 2021 – Japan, Korea
- Bijoaraneus legonensis (Grasshoff & Edmunds, 1979) – Ghana, South Africa, Thailand
- Bijoaraneus mitificus (Simon, 1886) – Pakistan, India, Bangladesh, China, Taiwan, Thailand, Cambodia, Singapore, Philippines, New Guinea
- Bijoaraneus postilena (Thorell, 1878) – Thailand, Indonesia, New Guinea
- Bijoaraneus praesignis (L. Koch, 1872) – Australia

== Taxonomy ==
The genus was established in 2021 when Tanikawa, Yamasaki & Petcharad conducted a phylogenetic analysis of orb-weaver spiders and recognized that several species previously assigned to the large genus Araneus formed a distinct clade. The type species is Epeira mitifica Simon, 1886, now known as Bijoaraneus mitificus.

Prior to 2021, species now placed in Bijoaraneus had been assigned to various genera including Epeira, Araneus, Zilla, and Zygiella by different authors over more than a century. The establishment of Bijoaraneus helped resolve the taxonomic confusion surrounding these species and provided a clearer understanding of their evolutionary relationships.
