= Zygiella carpenteri =

Scientific classification
- Kingdom: Animalia
- Phylum: Arthropoda
- Subphylum: Chelicerata
- Class: Arachnida
- Order: Araneae
- Infraorder: Araneomorphae
- Family: Araneidae
- Genus: Zygiella
- Species: Z. carpenteri

Binomial name
- Zygiella carpenteri (Archer, 1951)

Species of spider

Zygiella carpenteri is a species of orb weaver in the spider family Araneidae.

In 2015, the genus Parazygiella was determined to be a taxonomic synonym of Zygiella, so Parazygiella carpenteri and the other species of Parazygiella were moved to the genus Zygiella.
