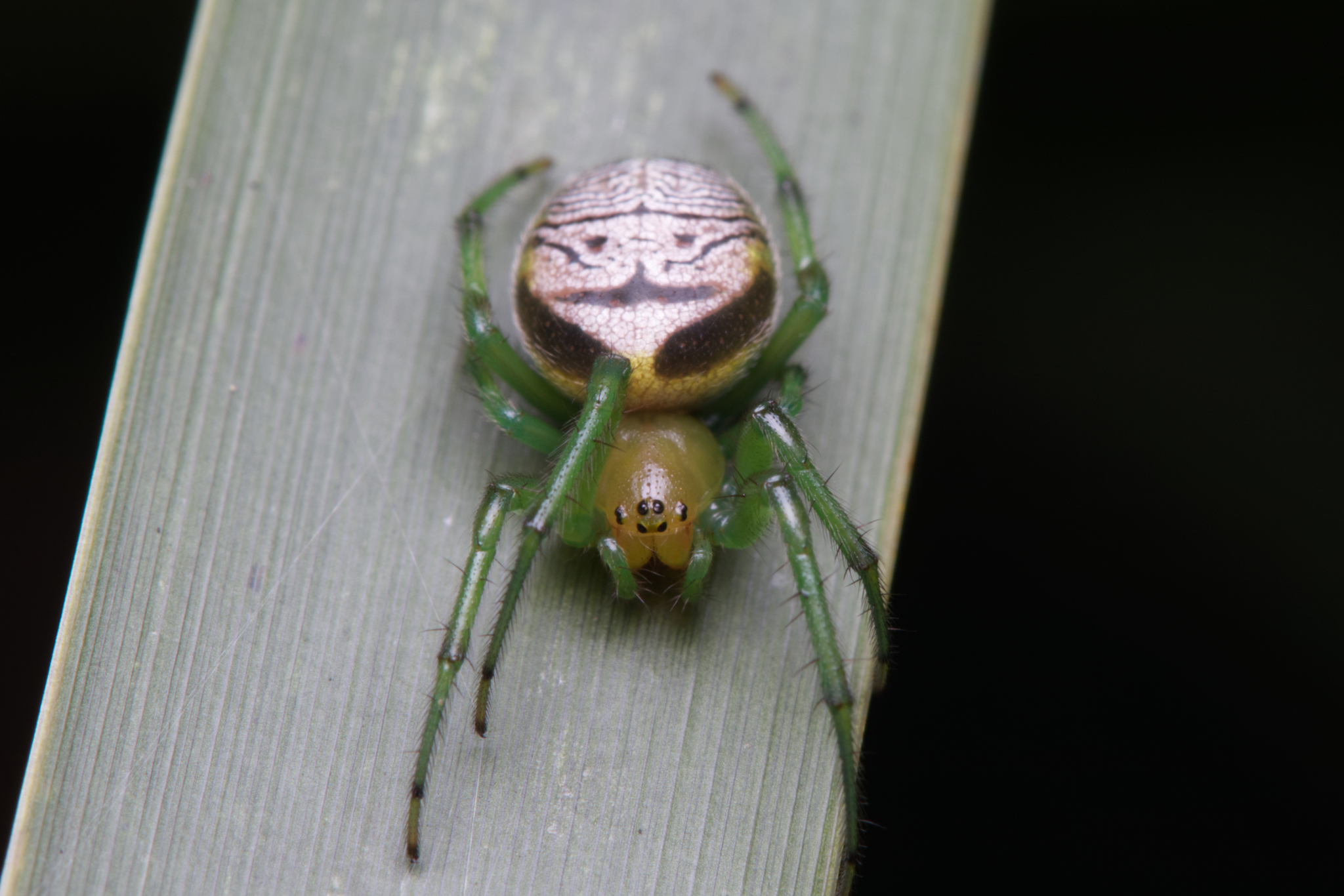
- female from Australia

Scientific classification
- Kingdom: Animalia
- Phylum: Arthropoda
- Subphylum: Chelicerata
- Class: Arachnida
- Order: Araneae
- Infraorder: Araneomorphae
- Family: Araneidae
- Genus: Bijoaraneus
- Species: B. praesignis

Binomial name
- Bijoaraneus praesignis (L. Koch, 1872)

Synonyms
- Epeira praesignis L. Koch, 1872

= Bijoaraneus praesignis =

Outstanding Orbweaver

Species of spider

Bijoaraneus praesignis is a species of orb-weaver spider in the family Araneidae. It is endemic to Queensland, Australia, where it is widespread and common in well-vegetated areas.

== Etymology ==
The species name praesignis is Latin meaning "distinguished" or "notable".

== Taxonomy ==
Bijoaraneus praesignis was originally described as Epeira praesignis by Ludwig Koch in 1872 based on a female holotype from Queensland, Australia. The species was later transferred to the genus Araneus and remained there until 2021, when it was moved to the newly established genus Bijoaraneus by Tanikawa, Yamasaki & Petcharad based on phylogenetic analysis.

== Distribution ==
B. praesignis is found in Queensland, Australia. The Atlas of Living Australia shows a record from New South Wales.

== Habitat ==
This species builds small orb webs in green shrubs at night and during the day hides in a retreat formed by binding a curved green leaf with silk.

== Description ==
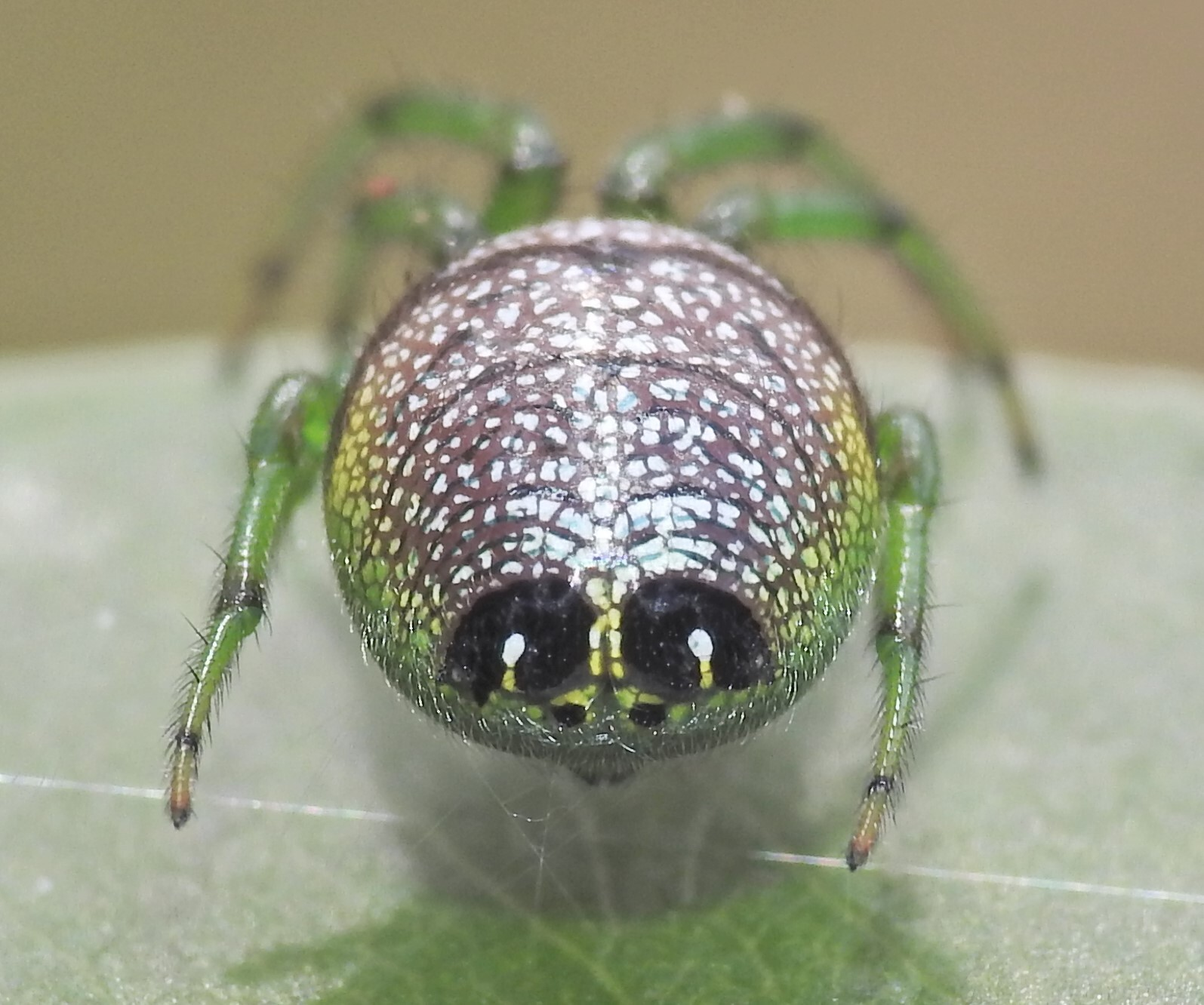
female from behind

Based on Koch's original description, the female has a dirty brownish-yellow cephalothorax, with brown chelicerae tips and black leg segments at the ends of the metatarsi and tarsi. The body length of adult females reaches up to 8 mm, while males are about 6 mm. The opisthosoma is yellow-brown at the front edge with yellowish-white markings on the sides and small yellow spots on the underside. The species has bold black blobs on the rear of the abdomen, perhaps mimicking eyes, which may represent a form of Batesian mimicry to appear more threatening than it actually is.

The epigyne is brown. The species exhibits the distinctive two large transverse black oval spots before the rear edge of the abdomen, which show some white dots in the middle, bordered on both sides by two fine black curved lines.

== Behaviour ==
B. praesignis shelters during the day in a silk-bound retreat made in a non-fully-closed leaf nearby, where its web is erected at night. The retreat formed by binding a curved leaf is probably also used for rearing young from eggs. Its food is night-flying insects and other invertebrates. Like most spiders, it is harmless to humans and can be handled by people without medical consequences, although allergic reactions may be possible.

== Cultural significance ==
In 2014, Carly Brooke Martinetti gave it the common name "Alien Butt Spider" by which it became internationally known. Due to its memorable common name and distinctive appearance, photographs of this spider have appeared in many online blogs and galleries.

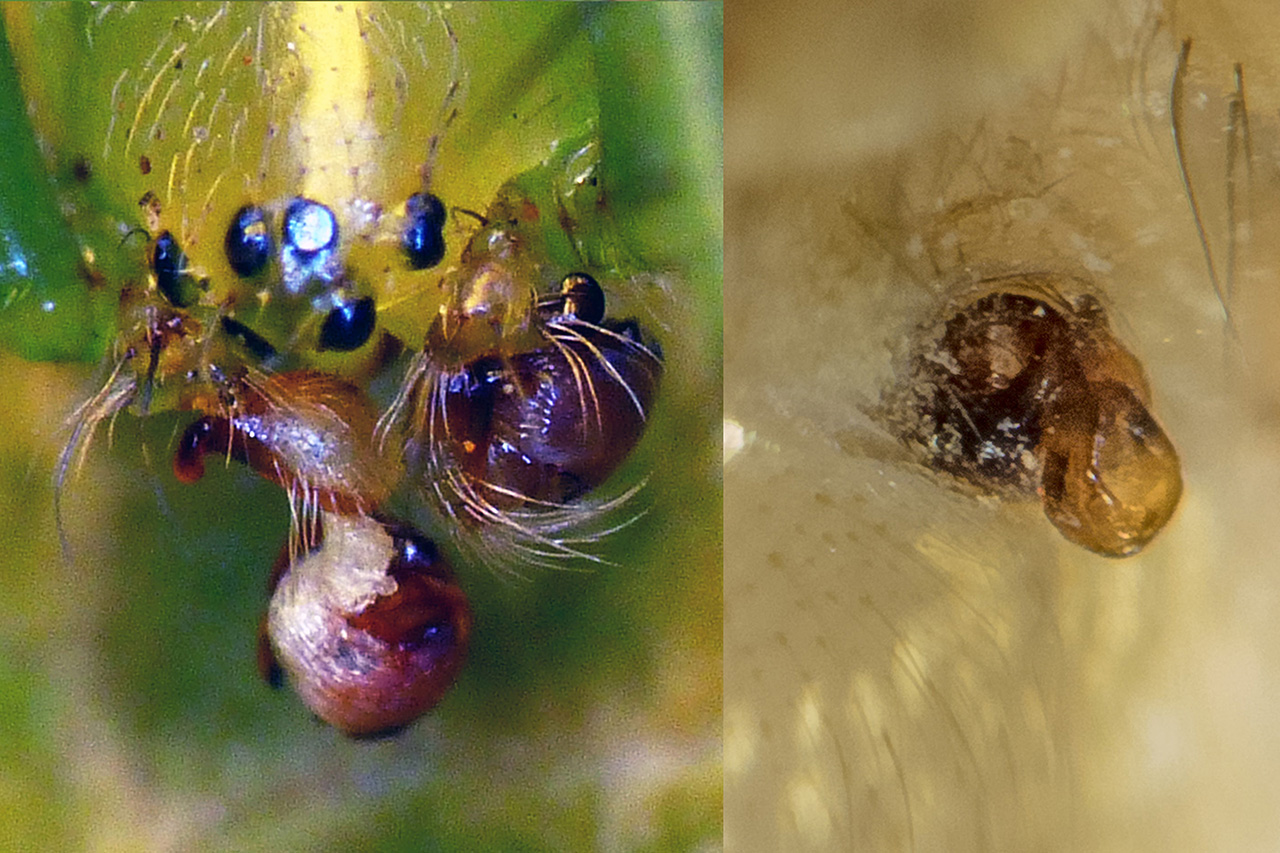
Araneus praesignis genitalia, left male, right female

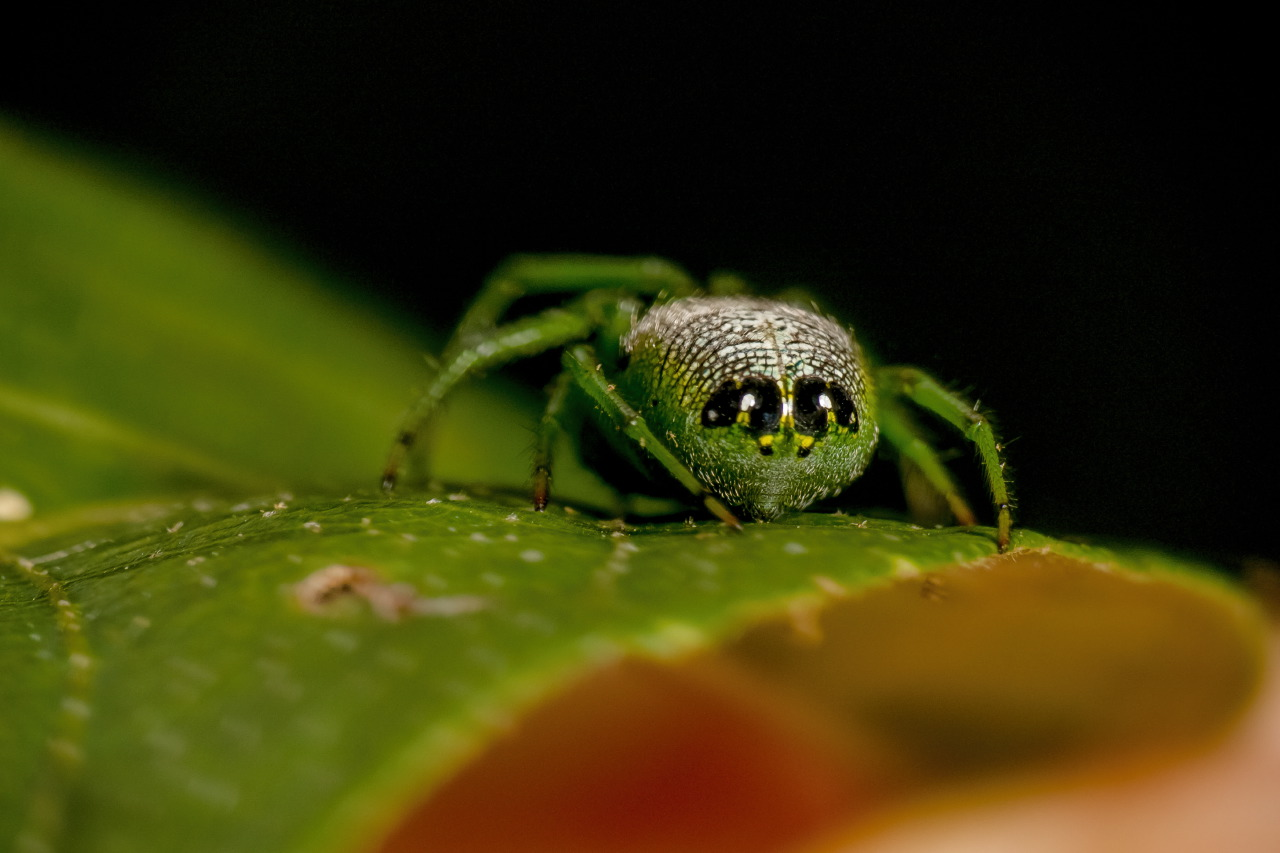
On a leaf of Mallotus claoxyloides, showing butt

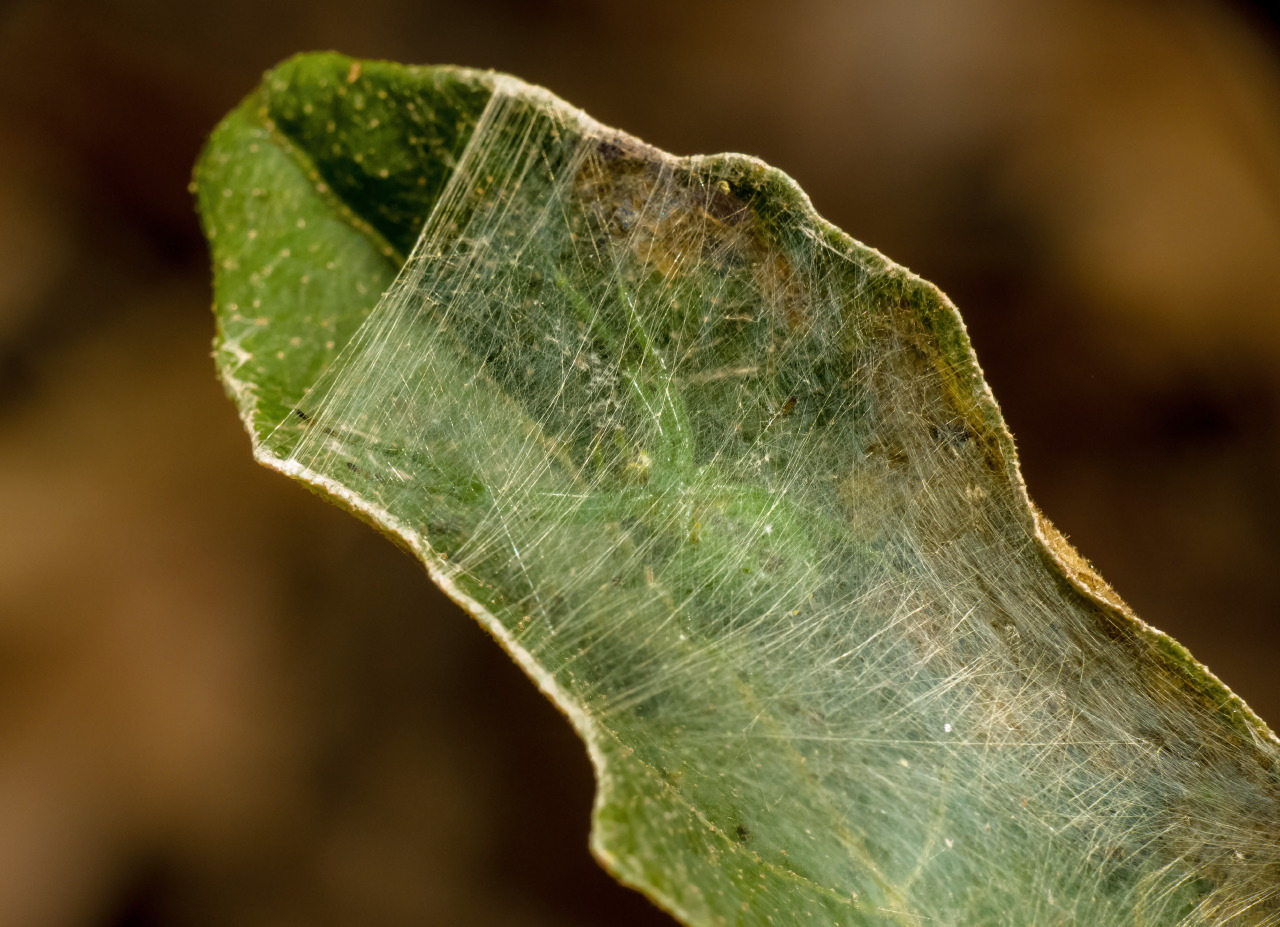
In curved leaf retreat

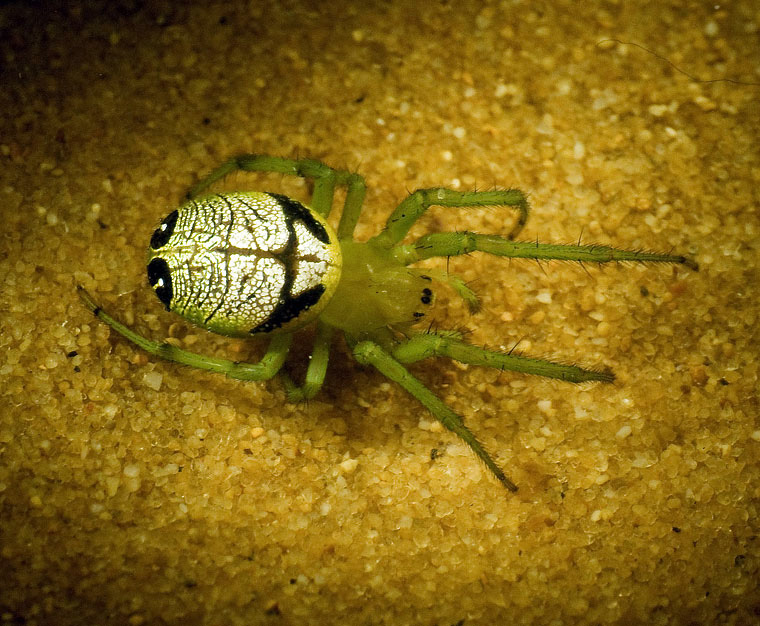
In ethanol, from above

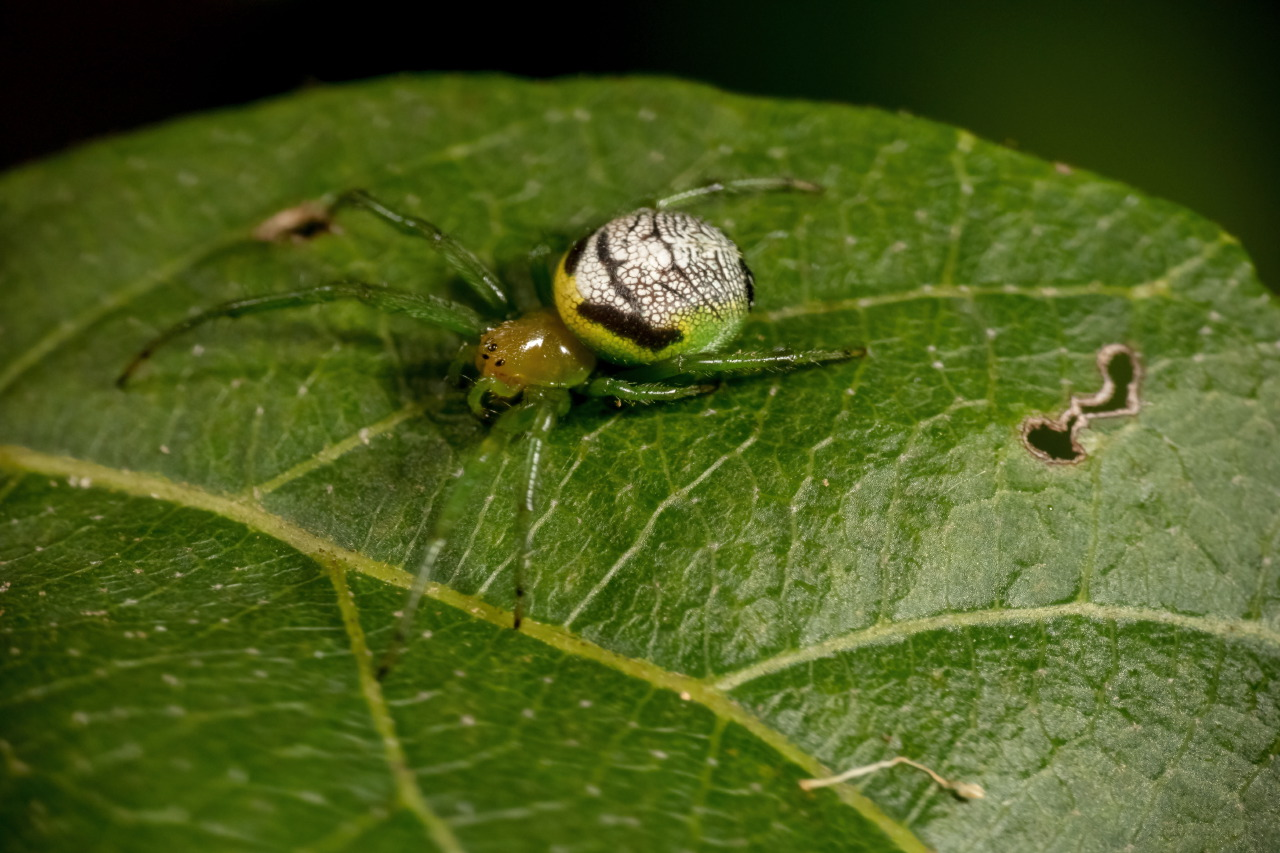
Oblique view, facing
