= Zygiella nearctica =

Scientific classification
- Kingdom: Animalia
- Phylum: Arthropoda
- Subphylum: Chelicerata
- Class: Arachnida
- Order: Araneae
- Infraorder: Araneomorphae
- Family: Araneidae
- Genus: Zygiella
- Species: Z. nearctica

Binomial name
- Zygiella nearctica Gertsch, 1964

Species of spider

Zygiella nearctica is a species of orb weaver in the spider family Araneidae. It is found in Canada and the United States.
