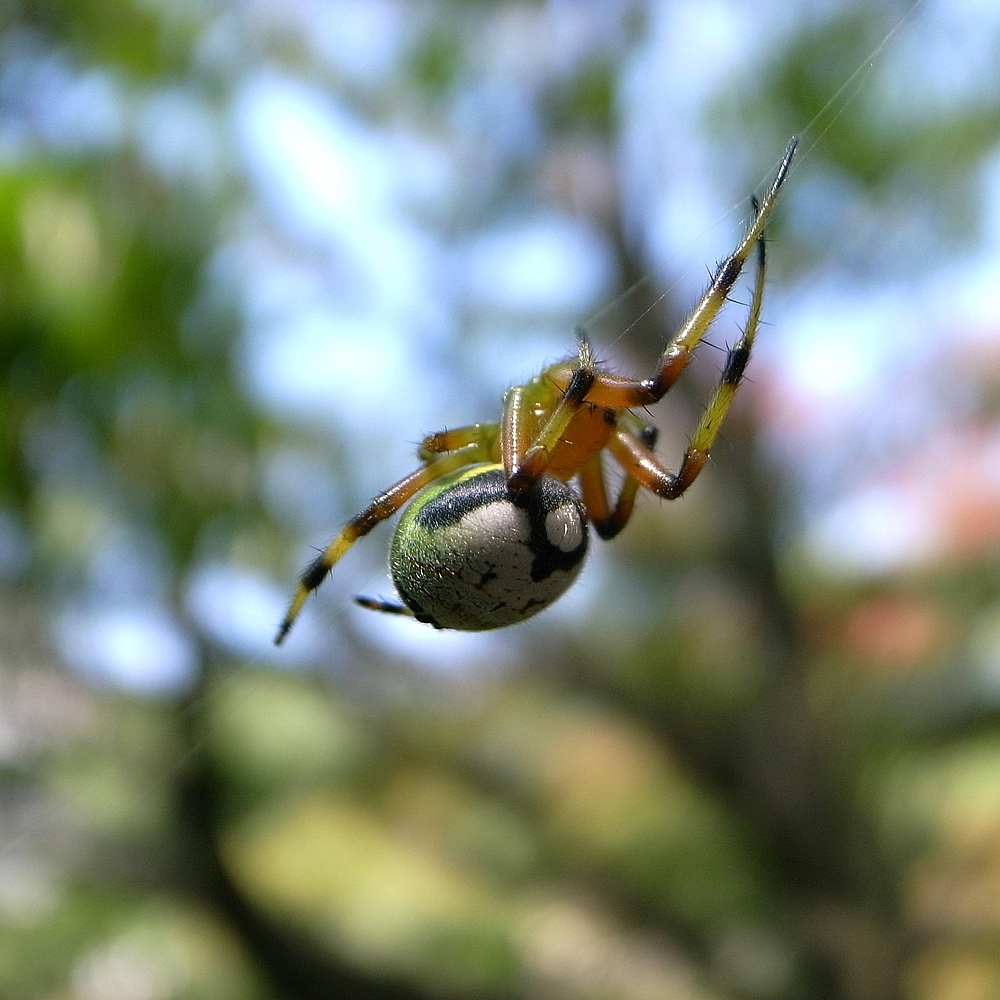
- Female from Hainan, China

Scientific classification
- Kingdom: Animalia
- Phylum: Arthropoda
- Subphylum: Chelicerata
- Class: Arachnida
- Order: Araneae
- Infraorder: Araneomorphae
- Family: Araneidae
- Genus: Bijoaraneus
- Species: B. mitificus

Binomial name
- Bijoaraneus mitificus (Simon, 1886)

Synonyms
- Afraranea mitifica Yaginuma & Archer, 1959; Aranea mitifica Bösenberg & Strand, 1906; Araneus mitifica Tikader, 1963; Araneus nawazi Dyal, 1935; Araneus nawazi Levi, 1974; Epeira mitifica Simon, 1886; Zilla nawazi Dyal, 1935; Zygiella nawazi Roewer, 1942

= Bijoaraneus mitificus =

Kidney garden spider

Species of spider

Bijoaraneus mitificus, synonym Araneus mitificus, commonly known as the kidney garden spider or pale orb weaver, is a species of orb-weaver spider found in South, East, and Southeast Asia.

== Taxonomy ==
The species was originally described in 1886 as Epeira mitifica by the French arachnologist Eugène Simon. It was subsequently transferred to the genus Araneus by Simon in 1909, where it remained until its transfer to the newly established genus Bijoaraneus in 2021.

The genus name Bijoaraneus is derived from the Japanese word "bijo" meaning "beautiful lady" combined with Araneus. The genus is distinguished by several morphological characteristics including the median ocular area being wider anteriorly than posteriorly, the male palpal femur having a basal tubercle, and the epigynal scape being short, well-sclerotized, and inflexible.

== Description ==
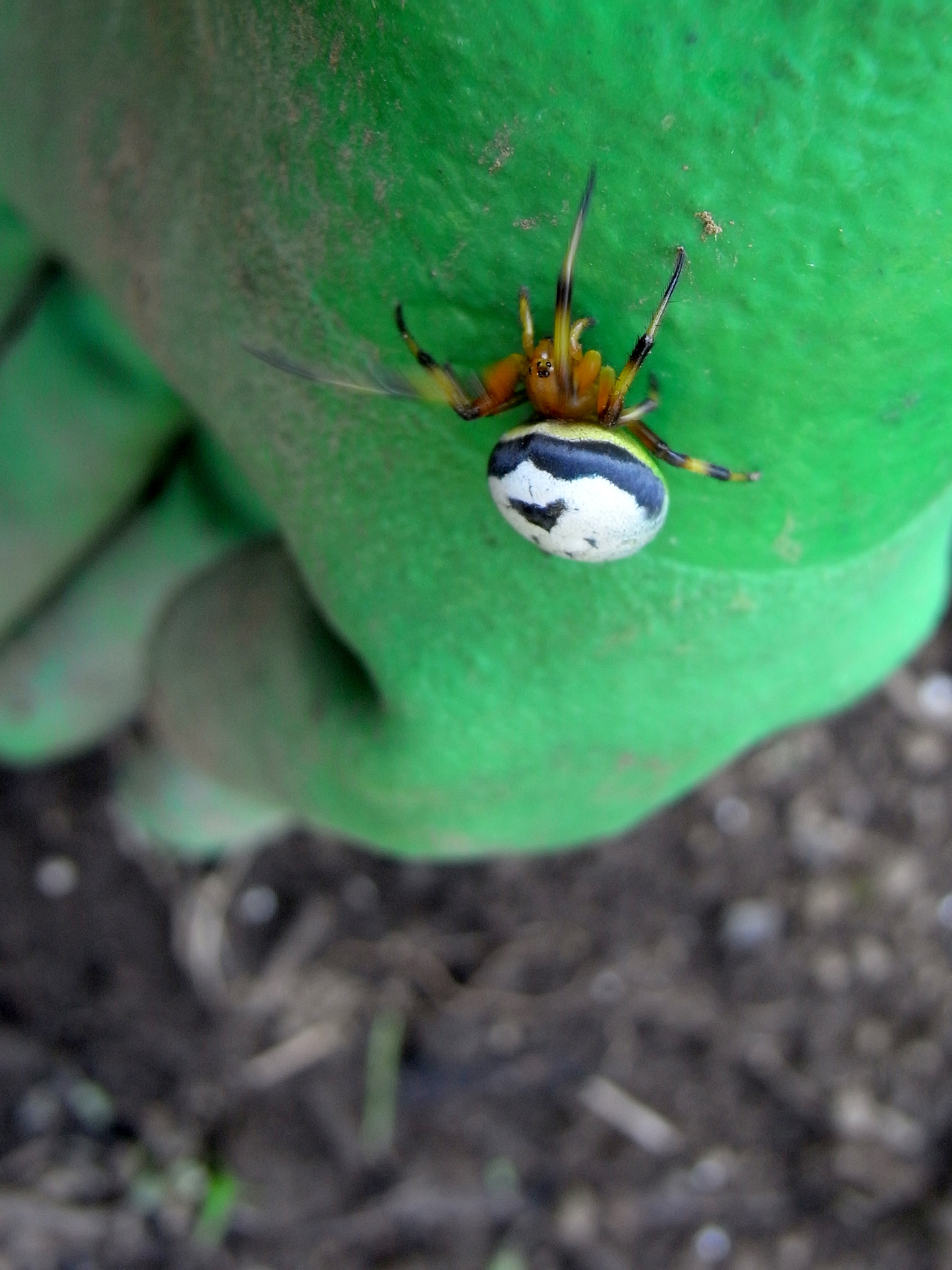
Climbing up a gloved human hand in Kamakura, Kanagawa, Japan

Bijoaraneus mitificus are small spiders and exhibit sexual dimorphism. The females grow up to 6 to 9 mm (0.24 to 0.35 in). Males are smaller, reaching only 3 to 5 mm (0.12 to 0.20 in), and are generally less colorful than the females.

Their abdomens are globular and covered with fine hair. They slope abruptly from the mid-region to the posterior. Two small but distinct tubercles are present at the rear end. The dorsal surface is covered with white and black patterns that can vary considerably. The front edge usually has a wide black band. In the upper center is a characteristic large kidney-shaped marking (which can sometimes be a faint vertical line or V-shaped), from which it derives its common name Kidney Garden Spider. Immediately below it are two small but prominent black pits (fovea). At the posterior half is a series of faint transverse ridges. The markings on the back of the spider can resemble a human face if viewed from the front.

The ventral side of the abdomen is a uniform green. The epigynes of the females have unwrinkled, very short and thick scapes.

The cephalothorax is reddish, yellowish, or green in color. It is narrower at the front than at the back and also covered with fine pubescence. The sternum is heart-shaped, narrowing towards the back. It is covered with long, black, spine-like hairs. They have eight eyes arranged in two recurved rows. The front row of eyes are larger and more recurved than the back row. Dark rings encircle the pair of central back eyes and the lateral eyes are close together and mounted on black tubercles.

The labium is wider than it is long and yellowish. The maxillae have almost square shapes and have distinct tufts of hair at the tips (scopulae). The chelicerae and pedipalps are also yellowish to brownish in color.

The legs are moderately strong and long. They are reddish, yellowish, pale green, to brownish in color. The distal ends of the leg segments have transverse bands dark brown in color. They are covered with long black spines and fine hairs. Its leg formula is 1-2-4-3, with the first pair the longest, and the third pair the shortest.

== Distribution and habitat ==
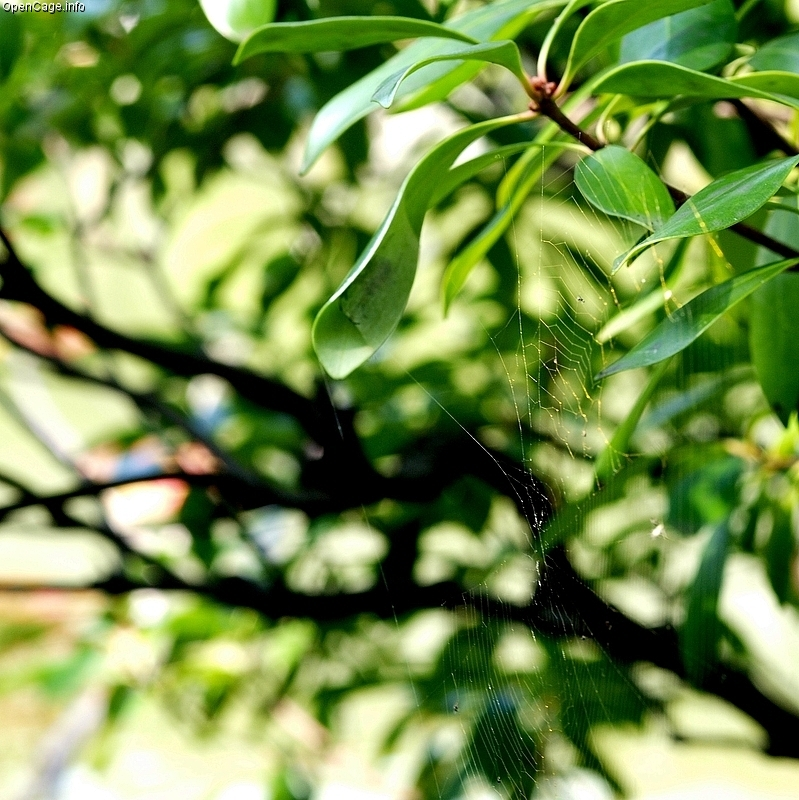
Resting in its sanctuary in Chūō-ku, Kobe, Japan. Note the missing segment on its web.

Bijoaraneus mitificus are found in South, East, and Southeast Asia; west from Pakistan and India, north towards China and Japan, and south towards the Philippines, Papua New Guinea and Australia.

They are common in gardens and low vegetation. They often build their orb webs among bushes.

== Behavior ==
Bijoaraneus mitificus builds orb webs that are characteristically missing a section. The spider does not rest on the center of the web, but instead builds a silk-lined sanctuary in a leaf at the margins. The leaf is bent at the edges and roofed with a mesh of silk. If a prey animal becomes entangled in the web, the vibrations from its struggle travel to the center of the web, then along a single long strand of silk (the signal line) positioned in the empty section. The strand is linked to the hidden spider. Once the spider feels the signal line vibrate, it will rush out to capture the prey.

Males also build orb webs, often near the webs of females. Their orb webs are usually smaller.

== See also ==
- Zygiella x-notata
- Araneus quadratus
- Araneus diadematus
- Orb-weaver spider
