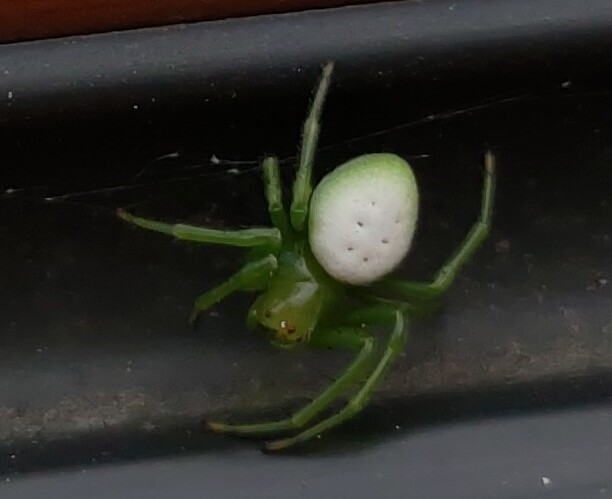
- A. pentagrammicus
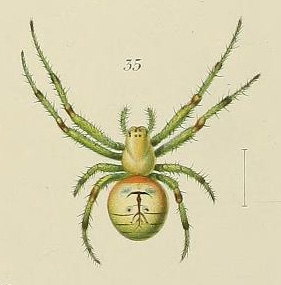
- female A. pentagrammicus

Scientific classification
- Kingdom: Animalia
- Phylum: Arthropoda
- Subphylum: Chelicerata
- Class: Arachnida
- Order: Araneae
- Infraorder: Araneomorphae
- Family: Araneidae
- Genus: Aoaraneus; Tanikawa, Yamasaki & Petcharad, 2021

Type species
- Miranda pentagrammica Karsch, 1879

Species
- 3, see text

= Aoaraneus =

Genus of spiders

Aoaraneus is a genus of spiders in the family Araneidae.

== Distribution ==
Aoaraneus is distributed across East Asia, with records from Korea, Japan, Hainan province in China, and Taiwan.

== Etymology ==
The genus name is a combination of the Japanese 青 (あお, ao) meaning "blue or green", and the genus Araneus.

== Taxonomy ==
All species in this genus were transferred from Araneus.

== Species ==
As of November 2026, this genus includes three species:

- Aoaraneus amabilis (Tanikawa, 2001) – Japan (Ryukyu Islands)
- Aoaraneus octumaculalus (Han & Zhu, 2010) – China (Hainan)
- Aoaraneus pentagrammicus (Karsch, 1879) – Korea, Japan, China, Taiwan (type species)
