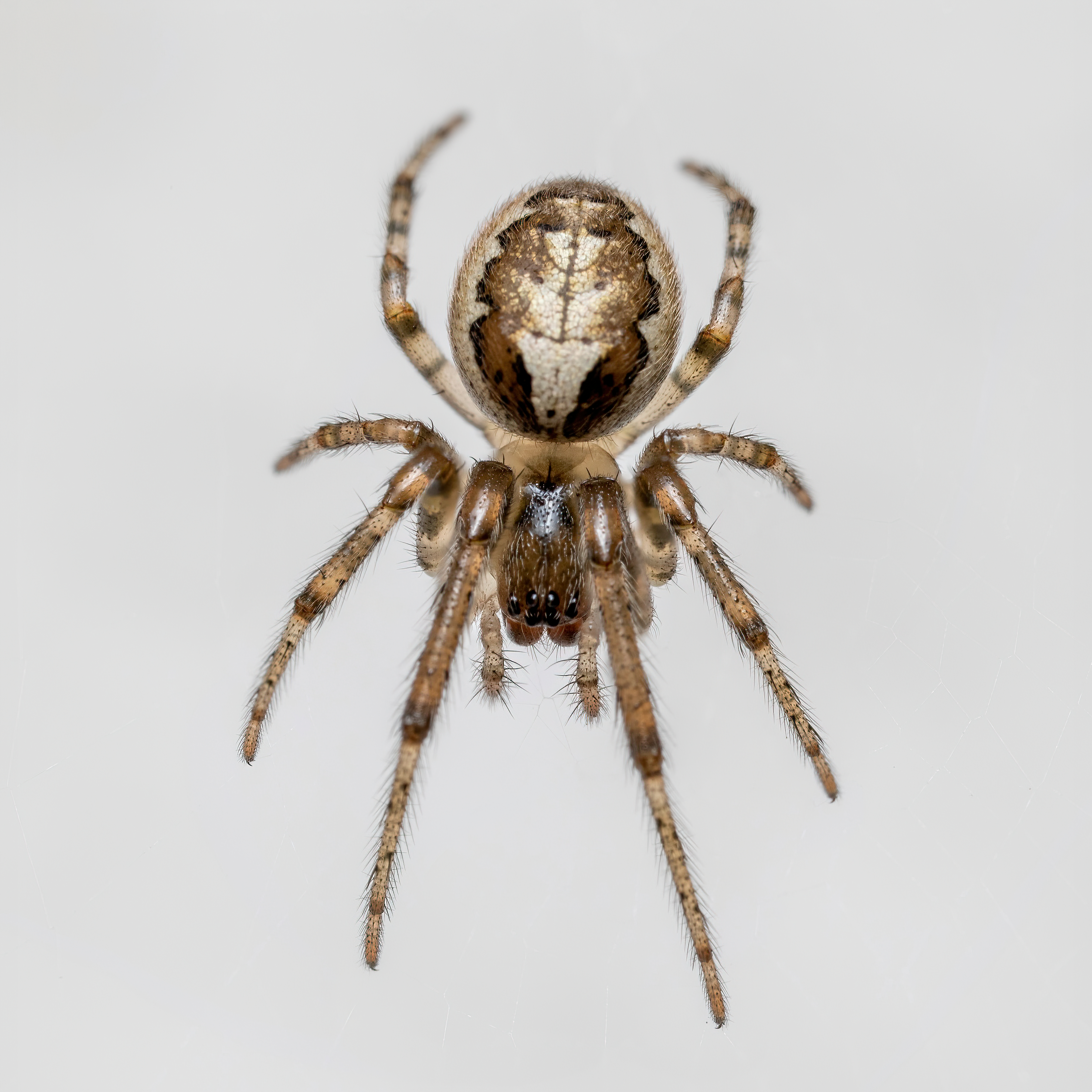
- Adult female Zygiella x-notata

Scientific classification
- Kingdom: Animalia
- Phylum: Arthropoda
- Subphylum: Chelicerata
- Class: Arachnida
- Order: Araneae
- Infraorder: Araneomorphae
- Family: Araneidae
- Genus: Zygiella
- Species: Z. x-notata

Binomial name
- Zygiella x-notata (Clerck, 1757)
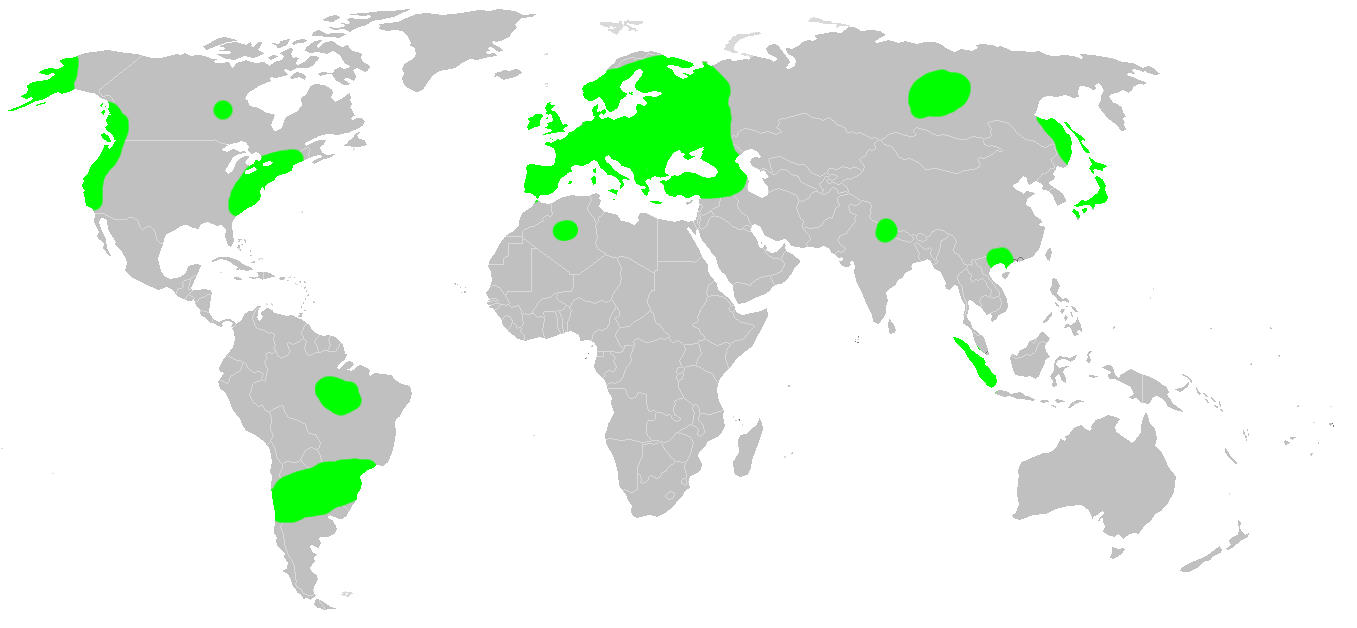
- Global distribution (green)

Synonyms
- Araneus x-notatus Clerck, 1757; Aranea litterata Olivier, 1789; Aranea calophylla Walckenaer, 1802; Zilla bösenbergi Keyserling, 1878; Zilla californica Banks, 1896; Zygiella x-notata chelata (Franganillo, 1909); Zygiella x-notata percechelata (Franganillo, 1909); Zilla gigans Franganillo, 1913; Pseudometa biologica Chamberlin, 1925; Larinia maulliniana Mello-Leitão, 1951

= Zygiella x-notata =

Species of spider

Zygiella x-notata, sometimes known as the missing sector orb weaver or the silver-sided sector spider, is a spider species in the family Araneidae. They are solitary spiders, residing in daily spun orb webs. Z. x-notata is a member of the genus Zygiella, the orb-weaving spiders. The adult female is easily recognized by the characteristic leaf-like mark on her posterior opisthosoma, caudal to the yellow-brown cephalothorax.

The webs of Zygiella x-notata spiders are known for their characteristic missing sector, lending to the common name of spider as the "missing sector orb weaver." This species is distributed widely around the world, primarily inhabiting areas of human occupancy in northern Europe.

Common prey include flying insects and other small insects. These get caught in the sticky spiral hub of the spider's orb web. Capture of prey occurs as the foreleg of Z. x-notata detects vibrations on the signal strand that connects the spider's retreat to the prey-capturing hub of the web. Webs are rebuilt daily by juvenile Zygiella x-notata and are renewed as needed by adult females. After sexual maturity, males discontinue web production in search of fecund females. After reproduction during the summer months, males die. Females produce an egg sac in late autumn and juveniles emerge in late spring. After several moults, juvenile females are ready to reproduce.

== Description ==
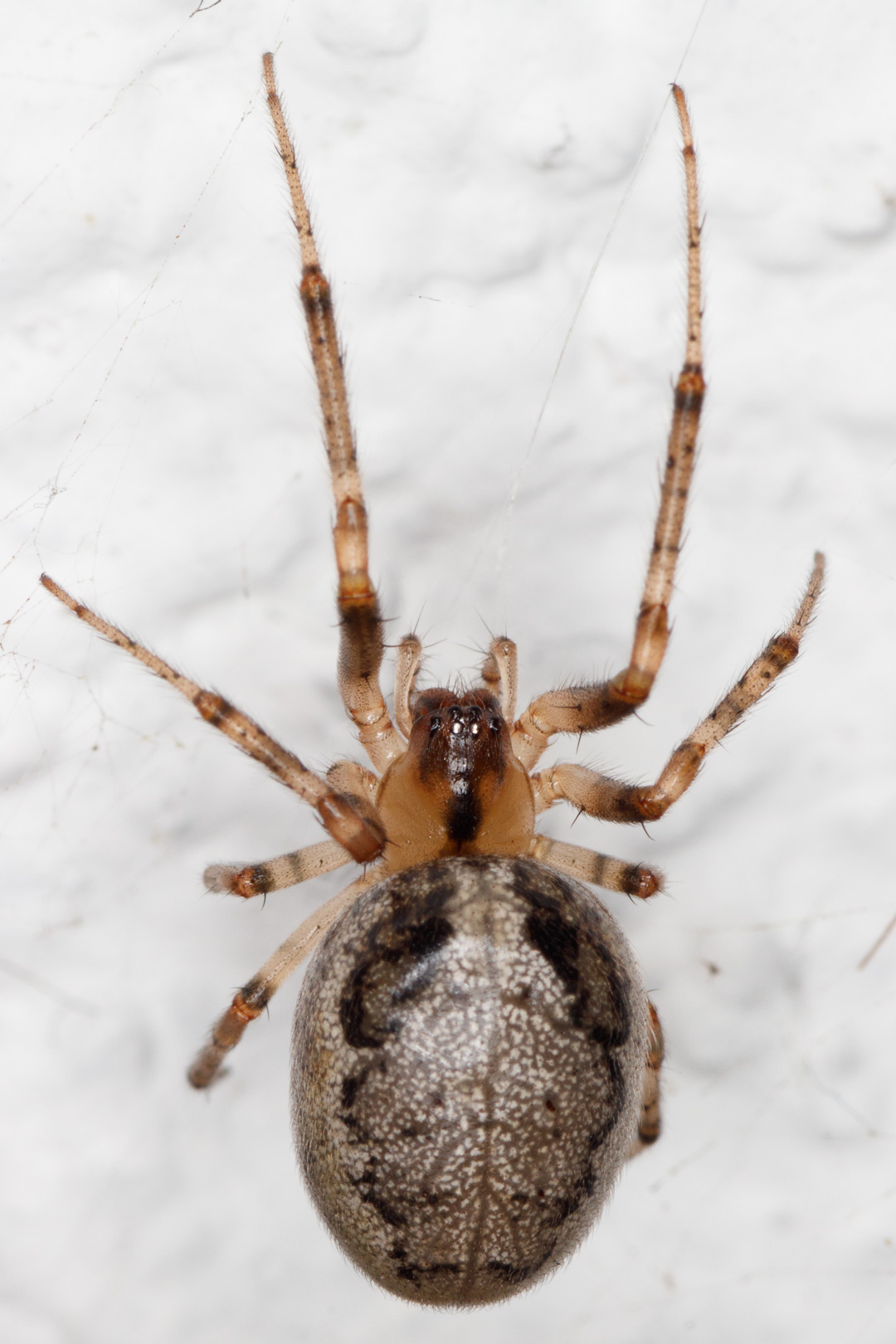
Zygiella x-notata dorsal view. The leaf-like mark on the opisthosoma is clearly seen in this image.

The adult female Zygiella x-notata has a body size of 5-11mm in length, while adult males have a body size up to 7mm. In adult females, the carapace width is 1.5 mm. The dorsal tibia of the walking legs and pedipalps contain a group of trichobothria. There is only one sensillum on the leg metatarsus. The prosoma is yellow-brown, with a leaf-like mark on the opisthosoma. The abdomen has a silvery sheen due to guanine crystals below the skin. Adult females are recognizable from their grey banded legs and pattern of dark grey waves on their dorsal side. Adult males are smaller than adult females, and display a dark dorsal exterior with dark brown legs and cephalothorax. The male abdomen is smaller and less marked with a shiny cream color than the female abdomen. In moderate climate, adults appear from July to October, sometimes even into December. In warmer regions, Z. x-notata is active all year.

== Common names ==
The common name missing sector orb weaver comes from the distinctive structure of Z. x-notata's web. Characteristically, this species is known to build a web with a missing sector containing solely a signal thread in the top half. The species has also been referred to commonly as the silver-sided sector spider.

== Taxonomy ==
Zygiella x-notata was named by Clerck in 1757, as Araneus x-notatus. The taxonomic status of the species is still considered valid.

The specific name x-notata is Latin for "having been marked with an x".

== Habitat and distribution ==
=== Habitat ===
Zygiella x-notata is common in areas inhabited by humans, including on boats and docks. They are also found on urban vegetation like bushes or shrubs. Females construct an orb-web preferentially near human settlements, and this is where they live out their adult lives.

Zygiella x-notata has been discovered on cliffs and bushes in Britain and across Europe.

=== Distribution ===
This species of orb-weaving spider natively inhabits areas of Europe, and is invasive in some coastal areas of the Americas. They can also be found in some other locations around the world. Zygiella x-notata is abundant in the west Palearctic region, and is also distributed across the Holarctic. Primarily, Z. x-notata is widespread across much of Britain, as well as Western and Central Europe. They are also common in New Zealand and are occasionally found in South Africa, Mexico Colombia, Ecuador, Panama and Honduras.

=== Web aggregations ===
As urban colonizers, Zygiella x-notata often aggregate around human settlements. Ideal locations for web building include constructions such as walls, fences, and window frames, as these provide sufficient anchors for urban web development. Because these spaces are in high demand as optimal web building sites, they are often inhabited by multiple individual Zygiella x-notata spiders, where each individual builds and resided in their own web in close proximity with other individuals. Despite their characterization as solitary spiders, the species aggregate up to 25 individual spiders per square meter near human constructions.

== Diet ==
=== Feeding ===
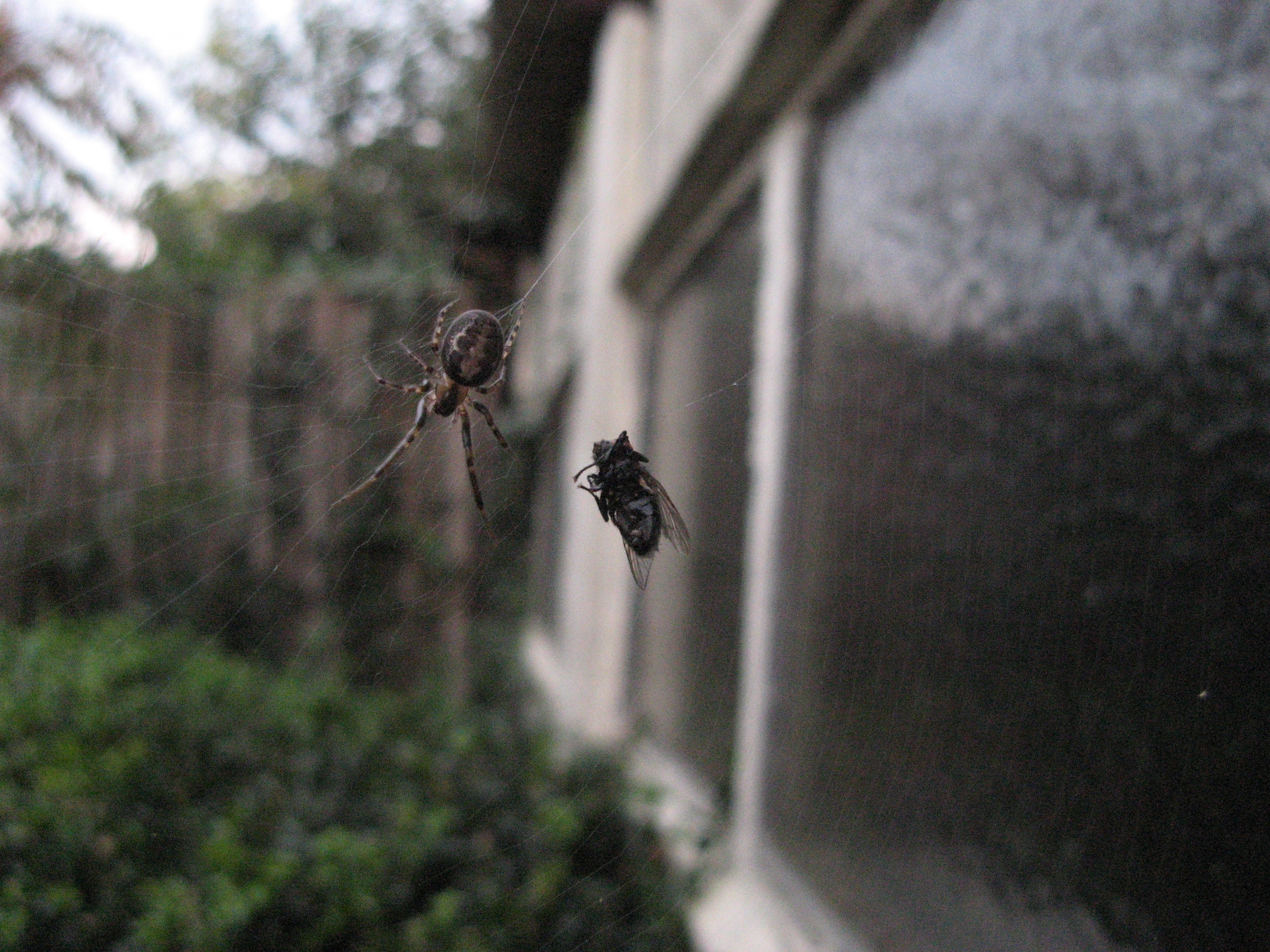
Zygiella x-notata female seen in the hub of her web in her preferential web-building habitat on a window frame. Her forelegs rest on the orb-web's signal thread that runs through the missing sector. She has caught a fly.

Juvenile zygiella x-notata characteristically build a new web each day until they reach adulthood. Adult Zygiella x-notata spin orb-webs which are used to capture and incapacitate prey. Rather than building a new web every day as juveniles do, adult female Z. x-notata build an initial web and renew it nearly every day as needed. The female spider will sit in her retreat on the web, which is attached to a signal strand in the characteristic missing orb-web sector. When prey are caught in the web, the female can thus detect its presence through vibrations in the signal strand. As these vibrations are detected, she climbs down the silken signal thread to the hub of the web where the prey has been trapped. Prey type is dependent on the spider's native habitat and geographical location, but usually consists of flying prey such as Diptera. Male Zygiella x-notata feed similarly to females as juveniles, but once they reach adulthood they no longer build webs in order to capture prey, rather focusing on successful reproduction.

==== Predatory feeding behavior ====
There are four stages of predatory behavior in Zygiella x-notata as described by Venner et al.: first, the "waiting phase" occurs, in which the spider is immobile in its retreat in the top corner of the web. A foreleg rests on the signal thread that spans from the spider's retreat to the hub of the web. Second is a "detection phase", where after prey has come into contact with the web, the spider moves toward it down the signal thread. Third is a "capture phase" in which the prey is incapacitated by the spider and subsequently moved back toward the retreat. Zygiella x-notata has been observed to bite and wrap its prey with silk during this phase as a means of incapacitation, prior to transportation to the retreat. Finally, there is an "ingestion phase" where the spider eats the prey in its retreat and removes the prey's remains from the web.

==== Vibratory signals in prey capture ====
Zygiella x-notata spiders have the capacity to detect vibratory signals in both the air and via web vibrations. When building an orb-web to initiate the prey-capture behavior, female Zygiella x-notata can detect the presence of potential prey through air-borne vibrations. This stimulates web-spinning behaviors, even prior to prey capture. Once vibratory signals are detected, female spiders engage in one of several potential behavioral response patterns: 1) at least one leg is slightly moved; 2) the spider's front legs are repeatedly lifted off the signal thread; or 3) the spider walks out of its retreat and scurries down the signal thread to the hub of the web. In a characteristic and repeatable series of events, the spider exits the hub, rushing in the direction of the source of the initial vibratory signal. Once the spider has found the source of the vibration, it touches the prey with its first pair of legs. The spider then grabs the prey using its first three pairs of legs, and bites it. Consequently, if no further vibrations (either threadborne or airborne) are detected once the spider has entered the hub of the web, Z. x-notata will actively vibrate the web to detect motionless dead prey or dirt particles hanging in the web. This "web-jerking" procedure, occurring through flexes in the spider's forelegs in contact with the web radii, is repeated until the spider finds a prey item in the web by following the anomalous vibration.

== Web ==
=== Web type ===
Zygiella x-notata spiders build an orb web in areas frequently occupied by humans. The orb web has a spiral-like appearance with radii converging to a central hub. During the early construction of the web, a nonsticky spiral is formed to later be replaced with a sticky spiral. Characteristic of the species, a "missing sector" is often present in the top half of the web that is crossed by a signal thread connecting the hub of the web to the spider's retreat. The signal thread is variable in length, reaching anywhere from 4 cm to 50 cm long.

=== Effects of prey on web-building ===
The predatory feeding behavior of the missing sector orb weaver influences changes in web construction. Web building was found to be stimulated by the presence of prey, resulting in spiders in the presence of prey to spin their webs earlier than spiders in the absence of prey. However, web building duration decreased in the presence of prey and thus web sizes were found to be smaller across the sample population. These characteristically smaller webs are spun with narrower web meshing, aiding in the quick capture of prey. Although these webs were smaller than webs built in the absence of prey, they provided a quick method to trap prey. This exemplifies Zygiella x-notata's capacity to sense changes in local prey availability. A similar study conducted by Venner et al. found that this species of orb weaving spiders changes its web building behavior in response to new information detected during prey capture. When the spiders experienced the act of capturing and consuming prey, they adapted their web construction and energy expenditure in anticipation of the next capture.

=== Web construction ===
Web construction occurs through an observable and repeatable process that becomes more organized with increasingly identical webs as the adult female spider ages. According to Anotaux et al. there are four steps to the process of web construction. First, the spider constructs an outer frame and radial threads. Second, she produces an auxiliary spiral. Third, she builds a sticky capture spiral meant to trap local prey. Finally, she remodels the center of the web – the hub – which connects to the signal thread as a prey detection device for the spider which lay in wait in her retreat.

=== Web longevity ===
Juvenile Z. x-notata spiders have been found to rebuild their webs daily in order to catch prey. Web renewal typically occur at the end of the night for both juvenile and adult spiders. Generally, the longevity of Zygiella x-notata webs is approximately one day.

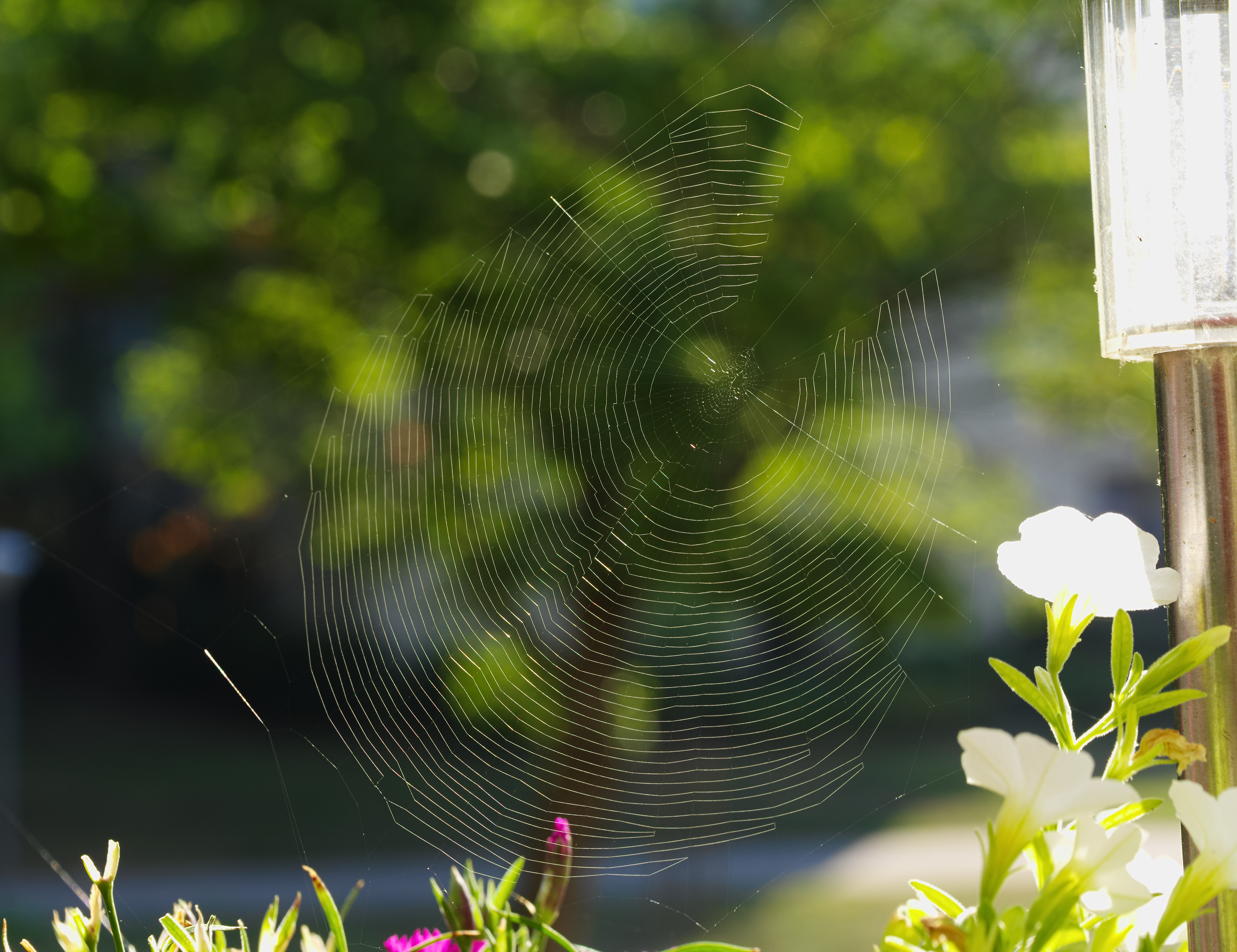
Orb web with missing sector

=== Influence of aging and experience on web construction ===
Multiple studies have shown that the composition and construction frequency of Zygiella x-notata orb webs change with increasing age and experience in the resident female. Anotaux et al. determined that older Z. x-notata spiders invest less silk in the production of their webs as compared to younger spiders in both short- and long-lived varieties. Older adult female spiders were also found to have greater variation in their orb webs than younger adult females, reflecting a decline in locomotor functioning correlated with increased web irregularity in older age. Venner et al. established a correlation between prey capture and ingestion, and web rebuilding practices among adult female Z. x-notata. Spiders who engaged in the four stages of predatory behavior and subsequently rebuilt their webs were found to invest less in the capture area of their newly built web.

=== Web anomalies ===
Spiders of the species Zygiella x-notata consider previous elements of web construction in the building of future webs. This is an imperfect process, susceptible to web building errors. Anomalies in web structure among this species have been found to result from positional modification of a spider on the radial strands of the web. When the spider's fourth leg is oriented peripherally to the web during web building, opposite the hub of the web, anomalies in web construction are common. In this position, the spider cannot detect the correct attachment position of the inner spiral to the next radial thread. Web anomalies are detrimental to spider success, as they can alter the performance of the web, including both prey capture ability and predation avoidance.

=== Characteristic missing web sector ===
Zygiella x-notata is known for its flexibility in web building with the missed sector orb webs that are woven by this species. Even though the web construction behaviors are innate, there is a characteristic flexibility in these spiders when they alter their webs according to their advantage and safety. Based on its knowledge of its retreat, Zygiella species typically leave a missing sector especially when creating webs on a door or window frame. Sometimes after building the complete webs, spiders will go back through and fill in the missing sector or they will not fill in a certain sector as per circumstances. The process of creating the missing sector involves switching direction in that region during the spiral or biting through threads to remove spirals in that section after building the full web.

== Reproduction and life cycle ==
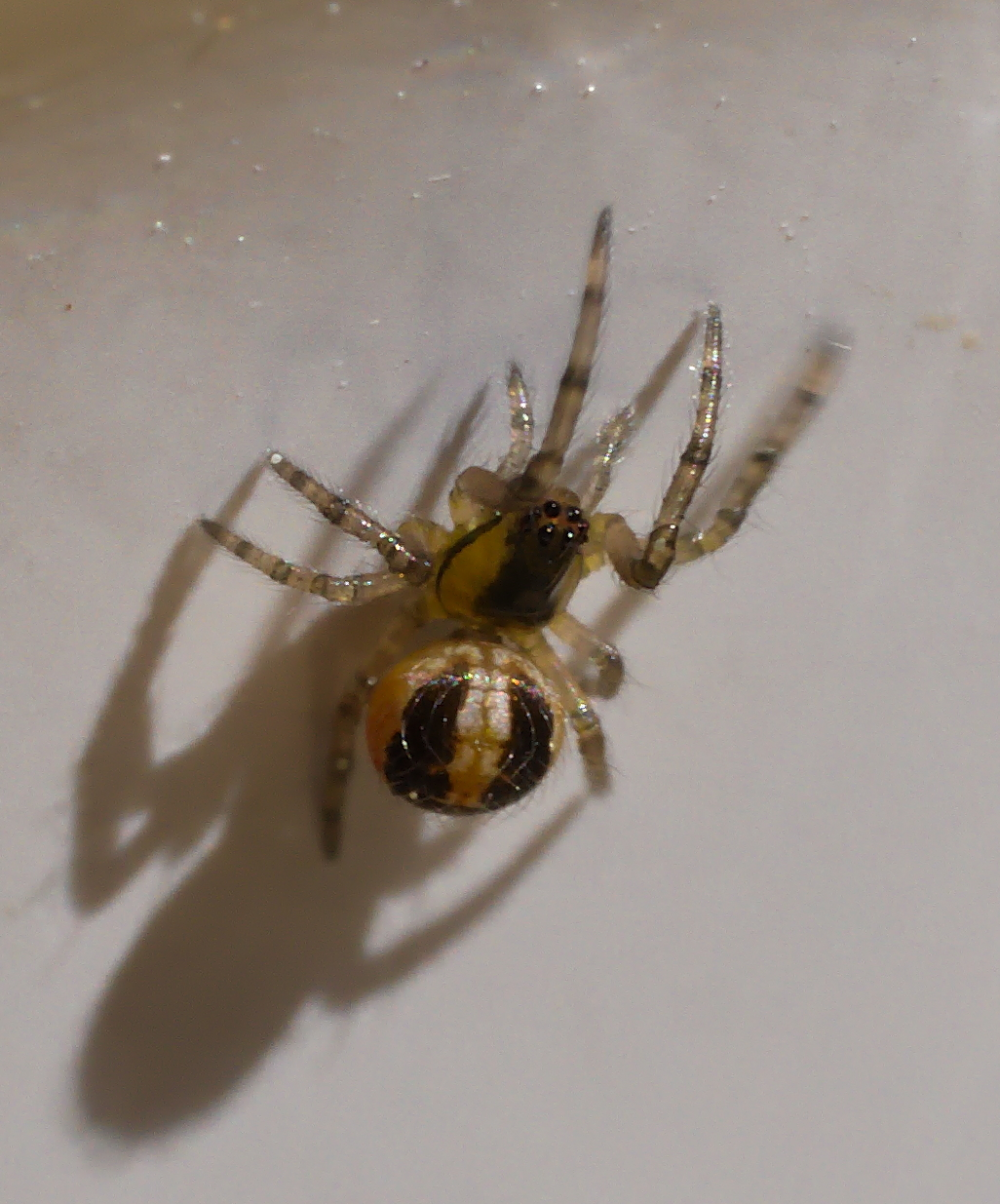
Zygiella x-notata spiderling, 1mm

=== Life cycle ===
Zygiella x-notata has an annual life cycle. Female spiders lay eggs in autumn, predominantly during the months of September and October. While males die soon after mating, surviving females protect the egg sacs over winter from Hymenopteran parasites. Egg sacs hatch in spring, and spiderlings subsequently disperse. Spiderlings reach their adult instar in August, when mating begins again, and the cycle starts anew. Once in the adult stage, female Zygiella x-notata has a life span of approximately 5–7 months.

=== Egg sacs ===
Egg sacs are used in arachnid species, providing protection to developing spiderlings against both predators and parasites. The egg sac provides spiderlings with a sufficient and sustainable embryological microclimate suited to development. Egg sacs also provide spiderlings with sufficient nutrients to survive through hatching.

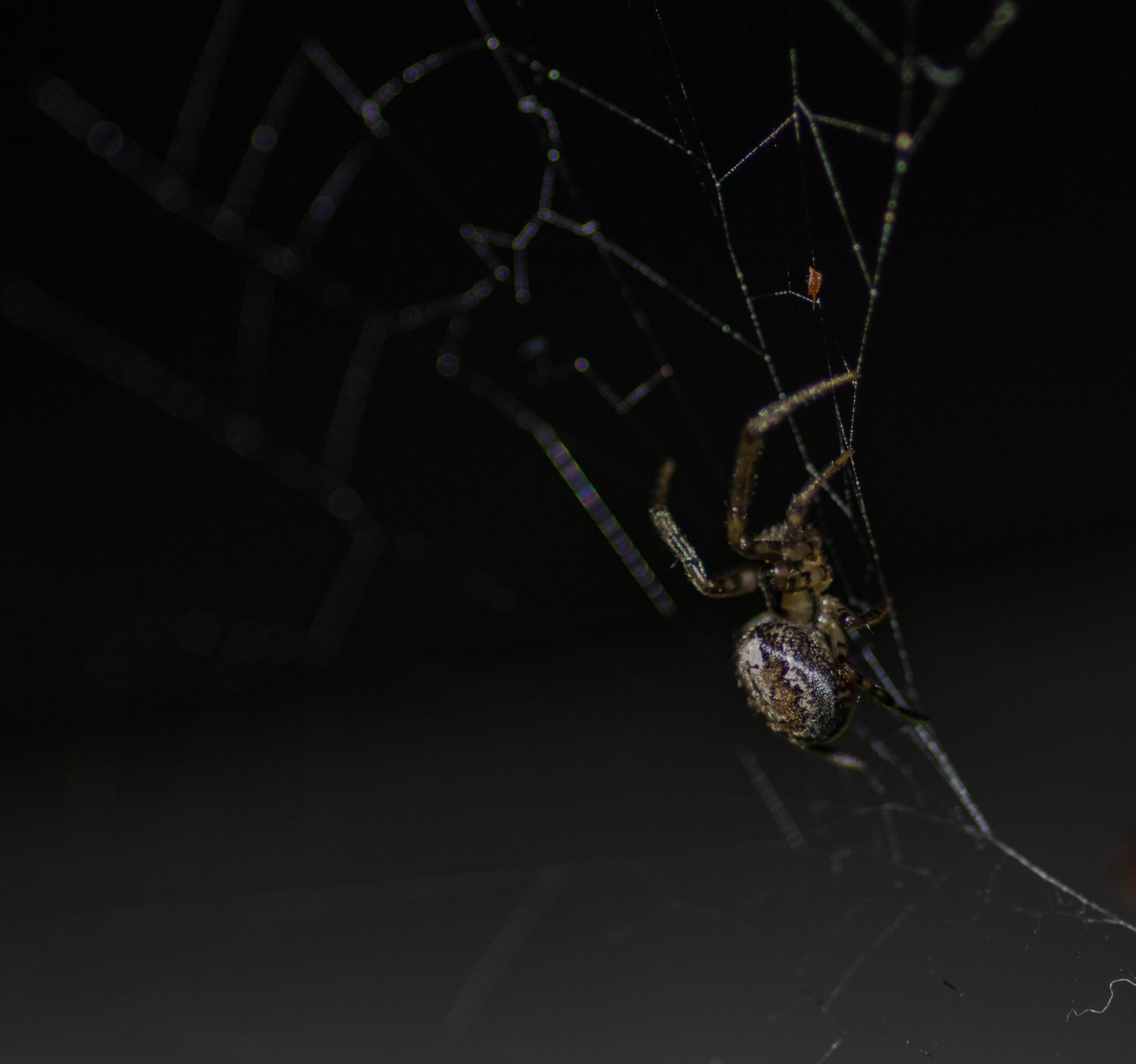
An adult female reaches about 6mm

Zygiella x-notata is an iteroparous species, with individual spiders engaging in multiple reproductive events throughout the course of their adult lifetime. Females of the species Zygiella x-notata produce egg sacs in late autumn. Spiderlings emerge in mid-to-late spring of the following year.

==== Structure ====
The egg sacs of the species Zygiella x-notata are elliptical in structure. They range from a white color to a yellow-brown color. The eggs are protected by a series of complex airy structures constructed from sequential layers of silk meshing. These layers of silk enclose and protect the eggs from predators, parasites, and the risks of premature hatching.

The structural composition of Zygiella egg sacs is similar with that of most other species belonging to the same family of orb-weaving spiders, Araneidae. The egg sacs are uniform in shape and structure, consisting of an inner basic layer, an intermediary double insulation layer, and an outer layer. These layers are in place to provide the developing spiderlings with protection from harmful external ecosystems and predators.

== Mating ==
Zygiella x-notata engage in a variety of mating behaviors, including male choosiness, mate guarding, and vibrational courtship. Female Zygiella x-notata store male sperm after mating, subsequently producing one egg sac during late autumn. Females that survive through winter sometimes produce additional egg sacs in the spring with their previous mate's stored sperm.

=== Male choosiness ===
Adult male Zygiella x-notata spiders have been found to be choosy for female mates in high competition environments. Bel-Venner et al. show that under conditions of weak intrasexual competition, males pair opportunistically with females, whereas in highly competitive environments, males selectively guard females according to their own competitive ability. This demonstrated a particular size assortative mating behavior in the differential mating preferences of Z. x-notata males, where large males frequently chose to mate with larger, more fecund females, and smaller males chose to mate with smaller females.

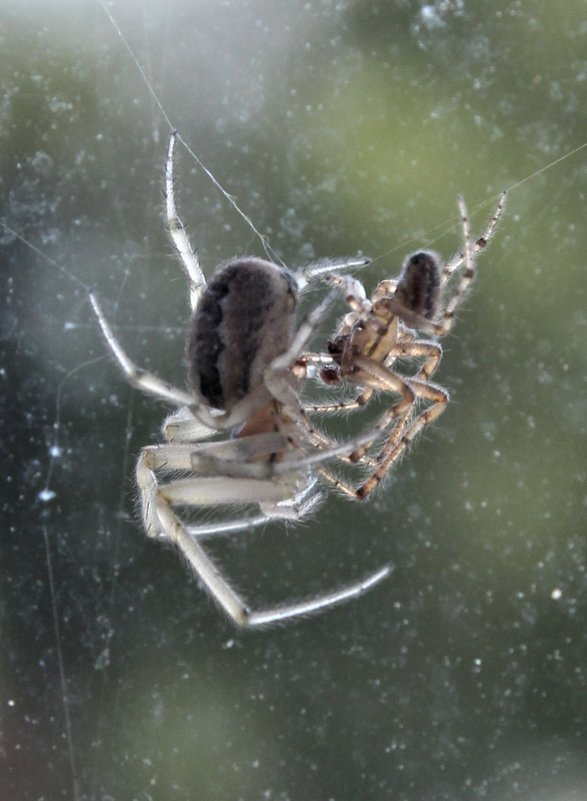
Mating Z. x-notata. The sexual dimorphism displayed is shown, as the male is significantly smaller than the female.

=== Mate guarding ===
Premoult females are a vital resource in the reproductive success of male Zygiella x-notata. Prior to copulation, male spiders try to guard a female before her final moult, when she becomes sexually receptive. By guarding the female, a male expects to be his guarded female's first copulation after becoming sexually receptive. This provides a significant reproductive benefit to the male, as mate guarding tends to lead to reproductive success.

Bel-Venner & Venner studied the precopulatory mate guarding behavior of Zygiella x-notata. They found mate guarding to be a widespread phenomenon among their population of interest, and observed strong competition between males to guard females with the frequent action of male takeover. As predicted by sexual selection theory, larger males were found to be more successful at guarding females and evicting smaller males from their guarding positions. Although there is an energetic cost to mate-guarding, males who engage in this behavior incur differential reproductive success on the basis of increased body size and competitive ability.

=== Vibrational courtship ===
The orb webs of female Zygiella x-notata spiders hang vertically under high tension conditions as two-dimensional sheets of silk. Male spiders of this species have been found to utilize the high tension of the web's silk threads to send vibrational courtship signals to the resident female. A study conducted by Tarsitano & Kirchner analyzed the vibratory patterns associated with this courtship ritual. Male Z. x-notata spiders were found to produce three types of vibrational courtship signals on the female's web. A periodic "pulling" signal, a "plucking" signal, and a "burping" signal were identified. The "pulling" and "plucking" signals are both performed by the male immediately prior to copulation as a means of arousing the resident female. These signals involve the male using his forelegs to "pull" or "pluck" a segment of silk he previously threaded into the signal strand on the female's web. The third, "burping" signal is produced by the male as he approaches the female in her retreat, and is likely used to warn the female that he is a potential mate, and not prey. This "burping" practice prevents the female from attacking the male as he begins engaging in the "pulling" and "plucking" pre-courtship signaling. The temporal patterning of these vibrational courtship signals enable the female to distinguish between a potential mate and potential prey items in her web.

== Social behavior ==
Zygiella x-notata is a species of solitary orb-weaving spiders. Apart from mating and spiderling kin-related sociality prior to dispersal, adult Z. x-notata do not interact socially with other individuals of the same species. However, the close proximity in which webs are built in their natural environments (i.e. near or on human constructions) may lead to aggressive, territorial behavior between individuals.

=== Within species aggression ===
With a growing human population, many Zygiella x-notata have adapted to living on or near human constructions in urban, suburban, and rural areas. Urban environments provide orb web building spiders, such as Zygiella x-notata, with sufficient locations in which to build their webs. However, high quality web building sites are coveted by many individuals of both the Zygiella species and other web-spinning species. In an urbanized environment, Zygiella x-notata exhibit high within-species aggression. This is in part due to the favorability of diverse, but stable, aggressiveness types in urban dwelling spiders. Aggressiveness may facilitate high density aggregations of spiders. Aggregations have been observed to consist of up to 25 individual spiders per square meter. However, high aggression rates within a population could prove costly. Increased aggression results in higher incidences of injury and death due to greater inter-individual fighting. Consequently, this aggressive typology is constrained to urban dwelling Zygiella found in web aggregations near preferential habitual spaces, indicating evolving behavioral plasticity in the species.

== Predators ==
=== Wasps ===
Wasps are active predators of spiders, particularly engaging in predation behaviors during the spiders' reproductive period. Wasp attacks by the species Vespula germanica are common in Zygiella x-notata. Male spiders and smaller females are at greater risk of predation by wasps.

==== Male preference ====
Males are located for predation by wasps more frequently than females. There are multiple reasons why this occurs. First, adult male Zygiella x-notata do not produce orb webs and thus reside on window frames or other human structures. This leaves males at a disadvantage, as they can be more easily identified by wasps. Second, the dorsal side of the male, as well as the male's legs and cephalothorax, appear significantly darker than that of the female. When placed in contrast with their residence on human settlements, the dark color of the male is easily visible and thus preferentially located by wasps. Third, male spiders engage in mate guarding behaviors. While guarding their potential female mates, males are typically located on the female's web, outside of her retreat. Here, the male is vulnerable to predation due to his increased visibility.

==== Predation avoidance ====
Due to the significant threat of predation by wasps, Zygiella x-notata has developed defensive behaviors to avoid predation threats. One tactic used by Zygiella x-notata to escape predation by wasps is jumping from webs or off human constructions. In males particularly, this survival behavior consists of jumping down the frame of a window, where he can no longer be located by the wasp. In female spiders, predation avoidance involves a tactic known as "web cleaning". Females' web cleaning behavior involves throwing prey remains out of the web after eating. If either prey or an inanimate object remain stuck on the web, the females will remove the section of web containing the prey or object, and rebuild the section of web. This behavior decreases the predation risk to females by lowering the wasp's visibility threshold. Additionally, web cleaning behaviors often occur at night to reduce the risk of potential predation. During the day, the female remains in her retreat to reduce visibility to wasps, thereby reducing predation risk.

==== Consequences of predation ====
Consequences of predation by wasps include decreased reproductive success of an individual Zygiella x-notata as a result of capture by the wasp, displacement of the spider upon jumping from the web or other structures, and prey theft by the wasp. These all pose physiological and energetic costs to the spider, occasionally resulting in physical impairment or death.

== See also ==
- Bijoaraneus mitificus
