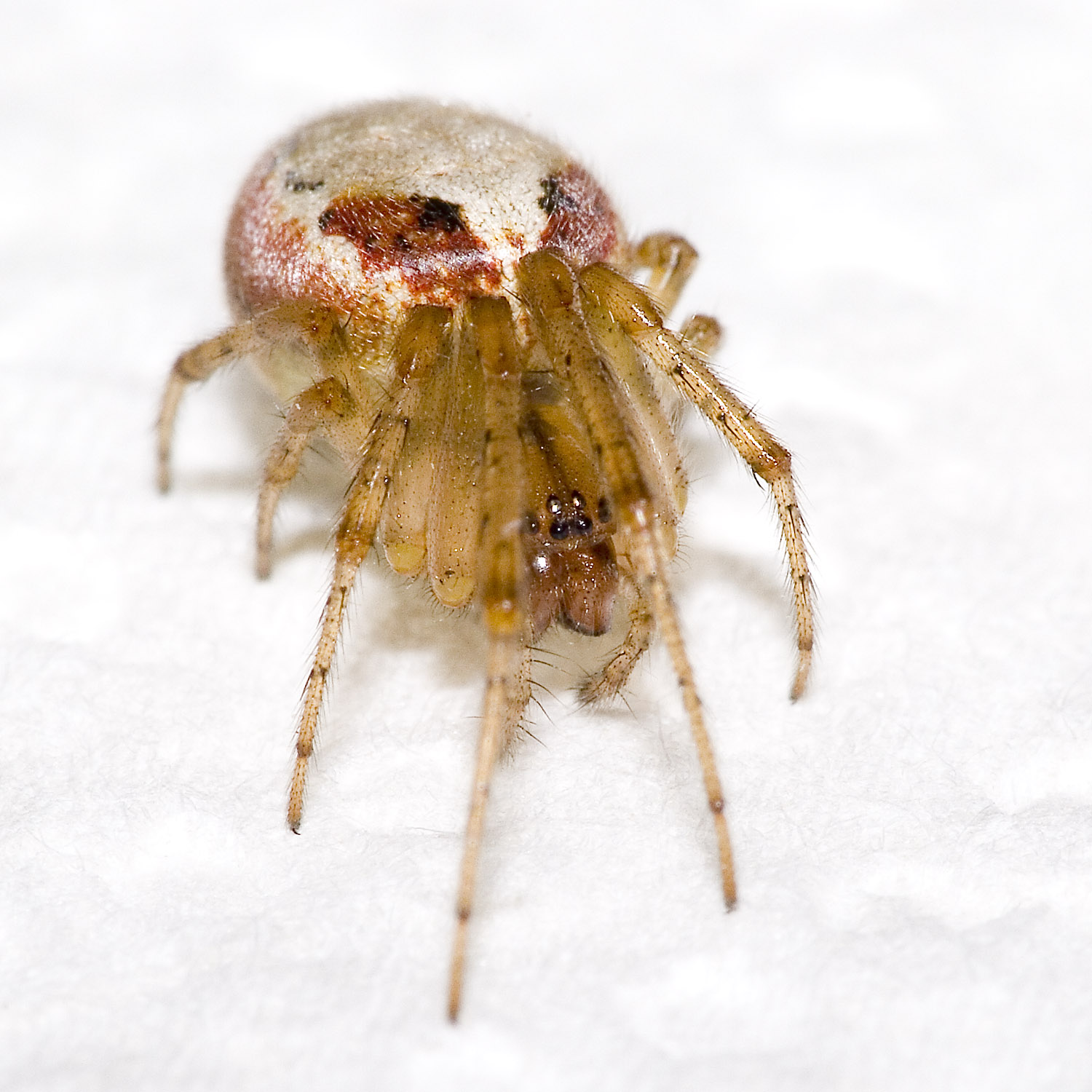
- Zygiella atrica
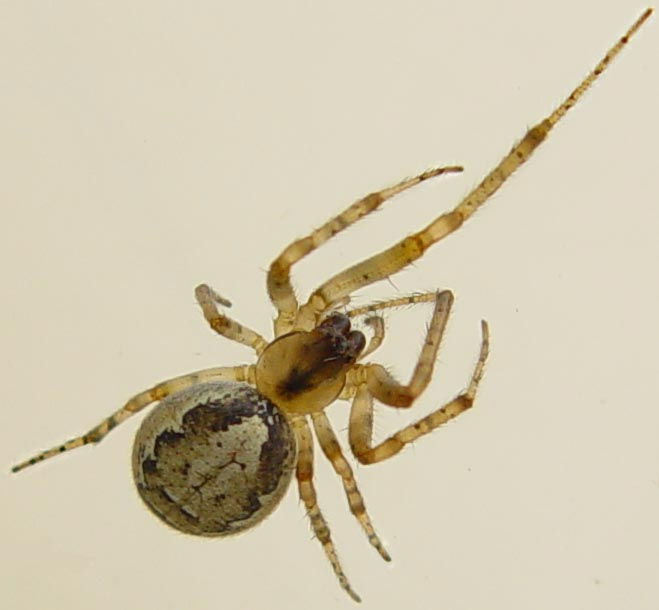
- Zygiella x-notata, female

Scientific classification
- Kingdom: Animalia
- Phylum: Arthropoda
- Subphylum: Chelicerata
- Class: Arachnida
- Order: Araneae
- Infraorder: Araneomorphae
- Family: Araneidae
- Genus: Zygiella; F. O. Pickard-Cambridge, 1902

Type species
- Z. atrica (C. L. Koch, 1845)

Species
- 11, see text

Synonyms
- Parazygiella Wunderlich, 2004

= Zygiella =

Genus of spiders

Zygiella is a genus of orb-weaver spiders that can be found globally. They are notable for their webs having a missing sector with it having only a single tread.

It was first described by F. O. Pickard-Cambridge in 1902. In 2015, Parazygiella was determined to be a taxonomic synonym of Zygiella, and its species were moved to Zygiella.

== Identification ==
Zygiella species are distinguished by the structure of the web, which has a missing sector containing a signaling thread leading to a retreat. Zygiella x-notata, a species in the Zygiella genus, is well-researched for its missing-sector web construction behaviors.

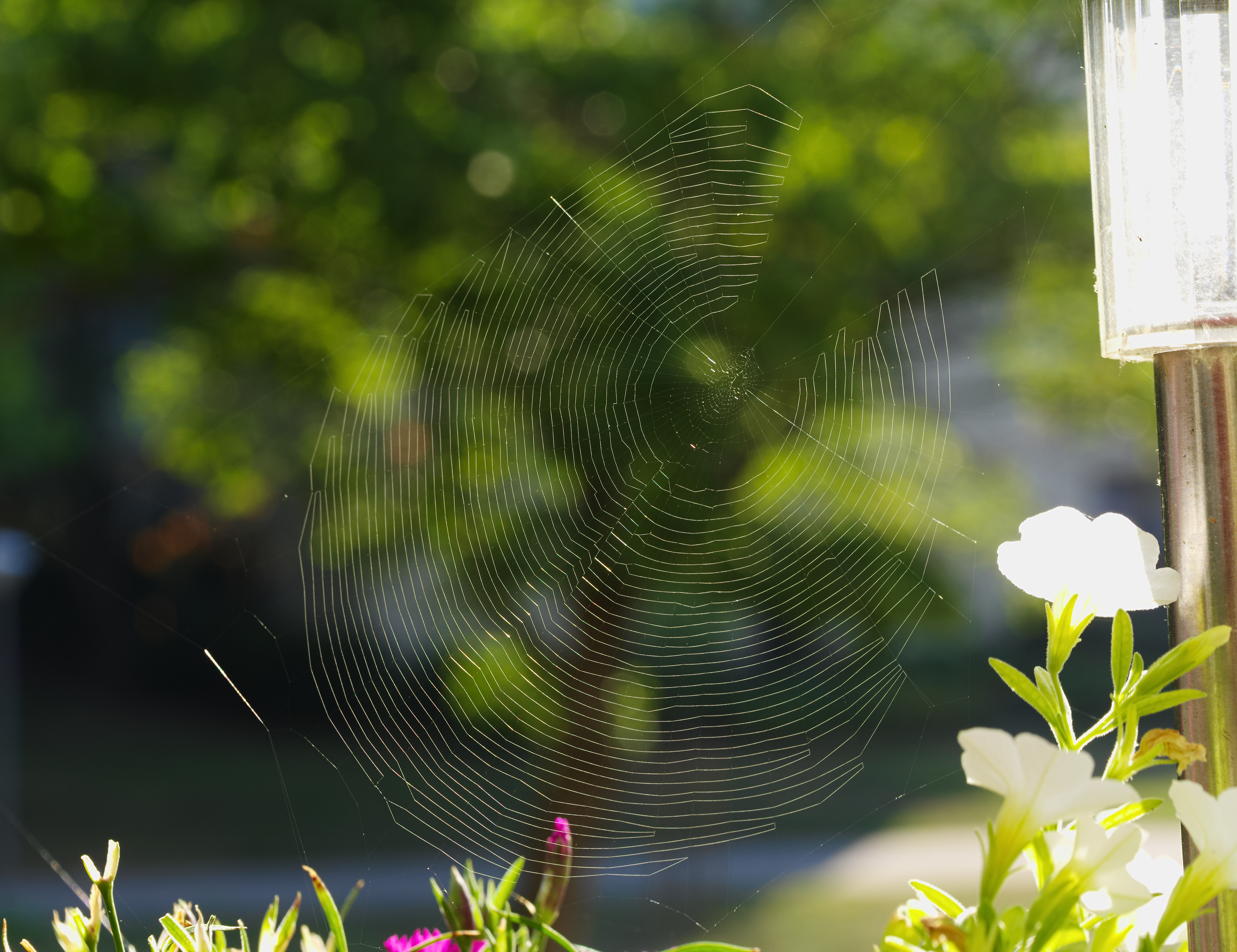
Web of Zygiella x-notata

== Species ==
As of April 2019 it contains eleven species:

- Zygiella atrica (C. L. Koch, 1845) (type) – Europe. Introduced to USA, Canada
- Zygiella calyptrata (Workman & Workman, 1894) – China, Myanmar, Malaysia
- Zygiella carpenteri Archer, 1951 – USA
- Zygiella dispar (Kulczyński, 1885) – North America, Russia (Far East), Japan
- Zygiella hiramatsui Tanikawa, 2017 – Japan
- Zygiella keyserlingi (Ausserer, 1871) – Southern Europe, Ukraine, Turkey
- Zygiella kirgisica Bakhvalov, 1974 – Kyrgyzstan
- Zygiella minima Schmidt, 1968 – Canary Is., Madeira
- Zygiella montana (C. L. Koch, 1834) – Europe, Turkey, Caucasus, Russia (Europe to Middle Siberia), Uzbekistan
- Zygiella nearctica Gertsch, 1964 – Canada, USA
- Zygiella x-notata (Clerck, 1757) – Europe, Turkey, Caucasus, Iran? Introduced to North America, Chile, Uruguay, Argentina, China, Japan, Réunion
