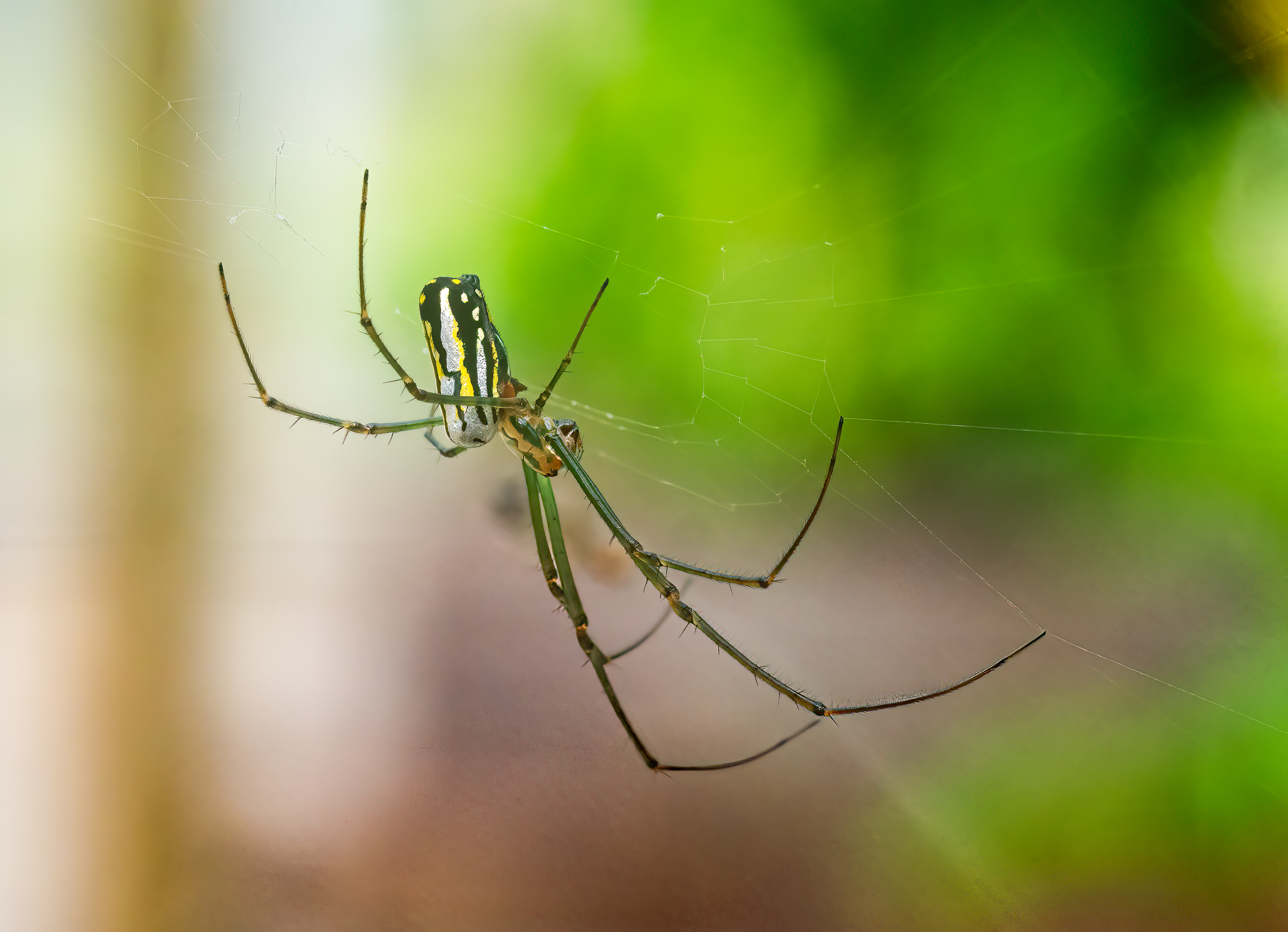
- Leucauge argyra in Costa Rica

Scientific classification
- Kingdom: Animalia
- Phylum: Arthropoda
- Subphylum: Chelicerata
- Class: Arachnida
- Order: Araneae
- Infraorder: Araneomorphae
- Family: Tetragnathidae
- Genus: Leucauge
- Species: L. argyra

Binomial name
- Leucauge argyra (Walckenaer, 1842)

Synonyms
- Tetragnatha argyra Walckenaer, 1842; Linyphia aurulenta C.L. Koch, 1845; Linyphia ornata Taczanowski, 1874; Meta argyra; Argyroepeira argyra; Argyroepeira aurulenta; Plesiometa argyra; Leucauge aurulenta

= Leucauge argyra =

Species of spider

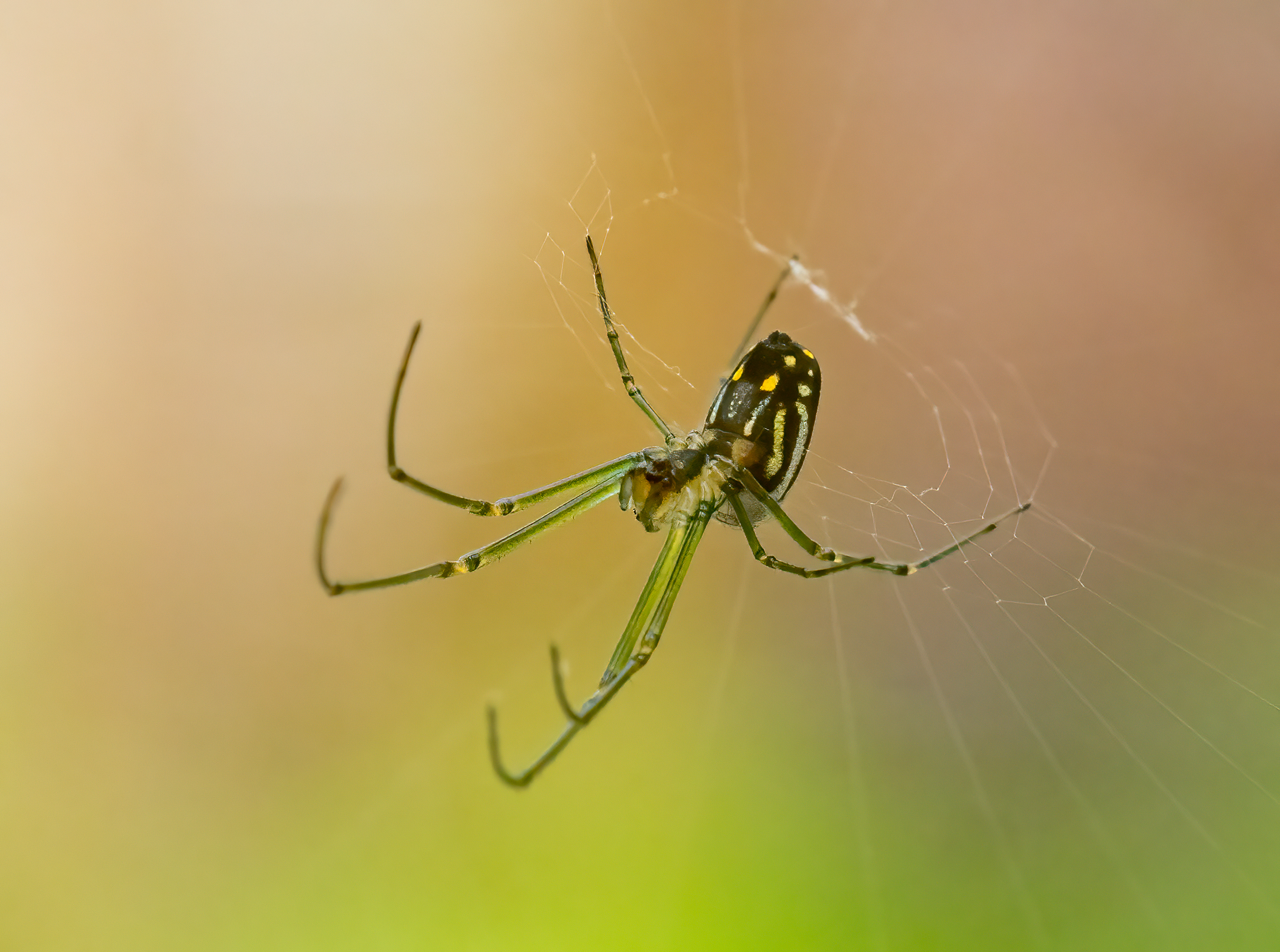
L. argyra in Costa Rica

Leucauge argyra is a spider found in North, Central and South America (from United States to Brazil and the Caribbean). Leucauge argyra (and many other Leucauge spp.) is known to be a colonial species, with spiders maintaining individual territories/orb webs within a scaffolding of shared support lines maintained by the group. Colonies of multi-generational individuals are often seen with some levels of size stratification (where larger individuals/adults occupy the highest web positions and smaller individuals/juveniles occupy lower web positions). It is known for being the host of the Hymenoepimecis argyraphaga, a Costa Rican parasitoid wasp.

== Description ==
Leucauge argyra has three lines on the abdomen that run parallel only about halfway across the abdomen, where the outer two bend inward before continuing parallel again through the rest of the abdomen. These markings can be somewhat variable, and different from L. venusta, where the abdomen has inverted V-markings.

Females have an epigyne with a ventral projection that is unique in the genus.

The web of juveniles has an upper tangle with threads connecting it to the hub and occasionally another tangle below the orb web, but these tangles are absent in webs of adults. The upper tangle consists of a few threads that cover only a narrow section across the middle of the orb.

A similar species to L. argyra is Leucauge mariana.

== Ecology ==
Leucauge argyra is known to exhibit colonial behavior, with individuals maintaining their own orb webs within a shared framework of supporting lines constructed by the group. Colonies are often multigenerational and may display a degree of size stratification, in which larger, typically adult individuals occupy higher positions in the web structure, while smaller, juvenile individuals are found in lower positions. Besides spider–plant interactions are relatively understudied and are often associated primarily with the predation of pollinators, Leucauge argyra has been reported in a relatively rare type of spider–plant interaction, in which its webs may influence herbivory on host plants. The species constructs orb webs, forming multi-layered structures within the vegetation. A study conducted in a forest understory area in Seropédica found that plants associated with webs of L. argyra exhibited lower levels of herbivory compared to plants without webs, suggesting a potential indirect protective effect against herbivores. This relationship has been interpreted as a case of facultative spider–plant mutualism, in which spiders use the plant as structural support in a prey-rich environment, while the plant may benefit from reduced foliar damage.

== Gallery ==
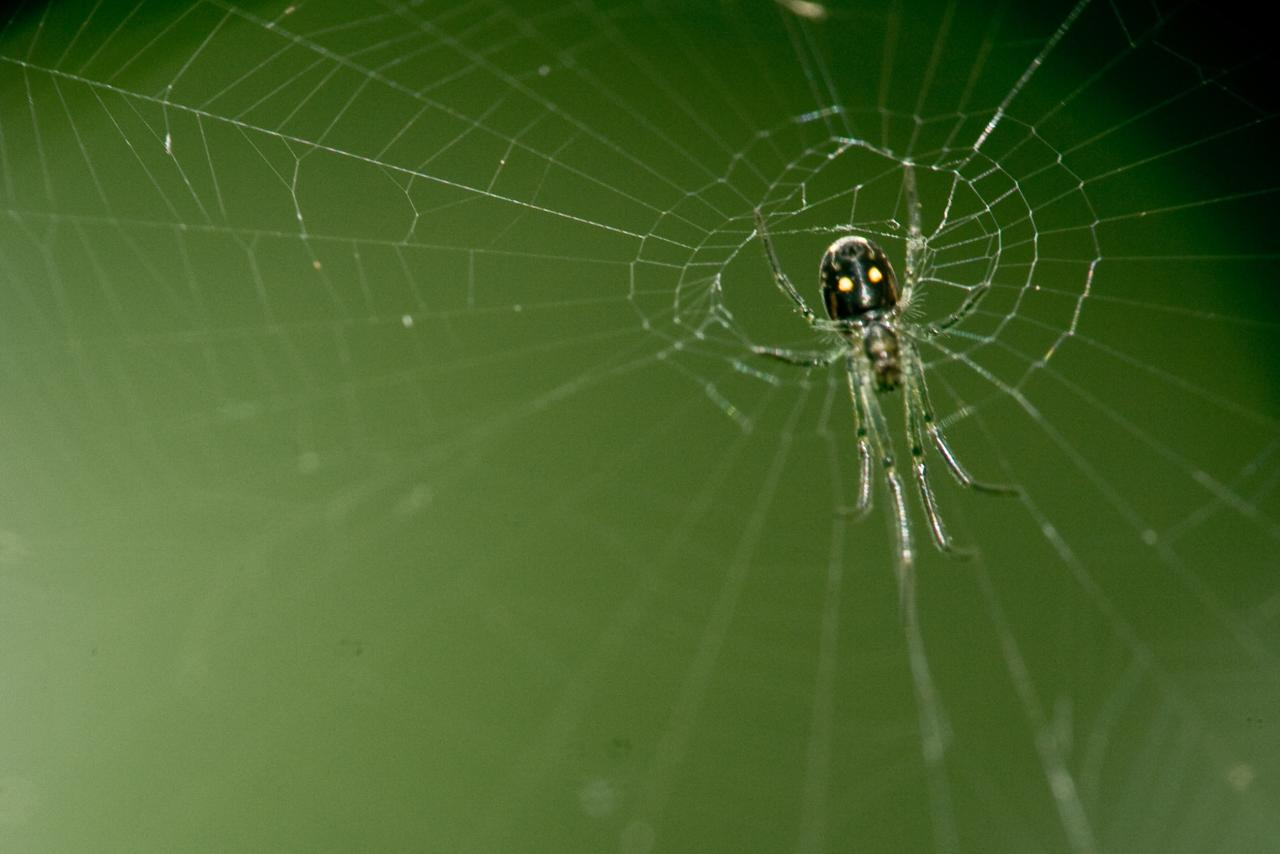
L. argyra in web

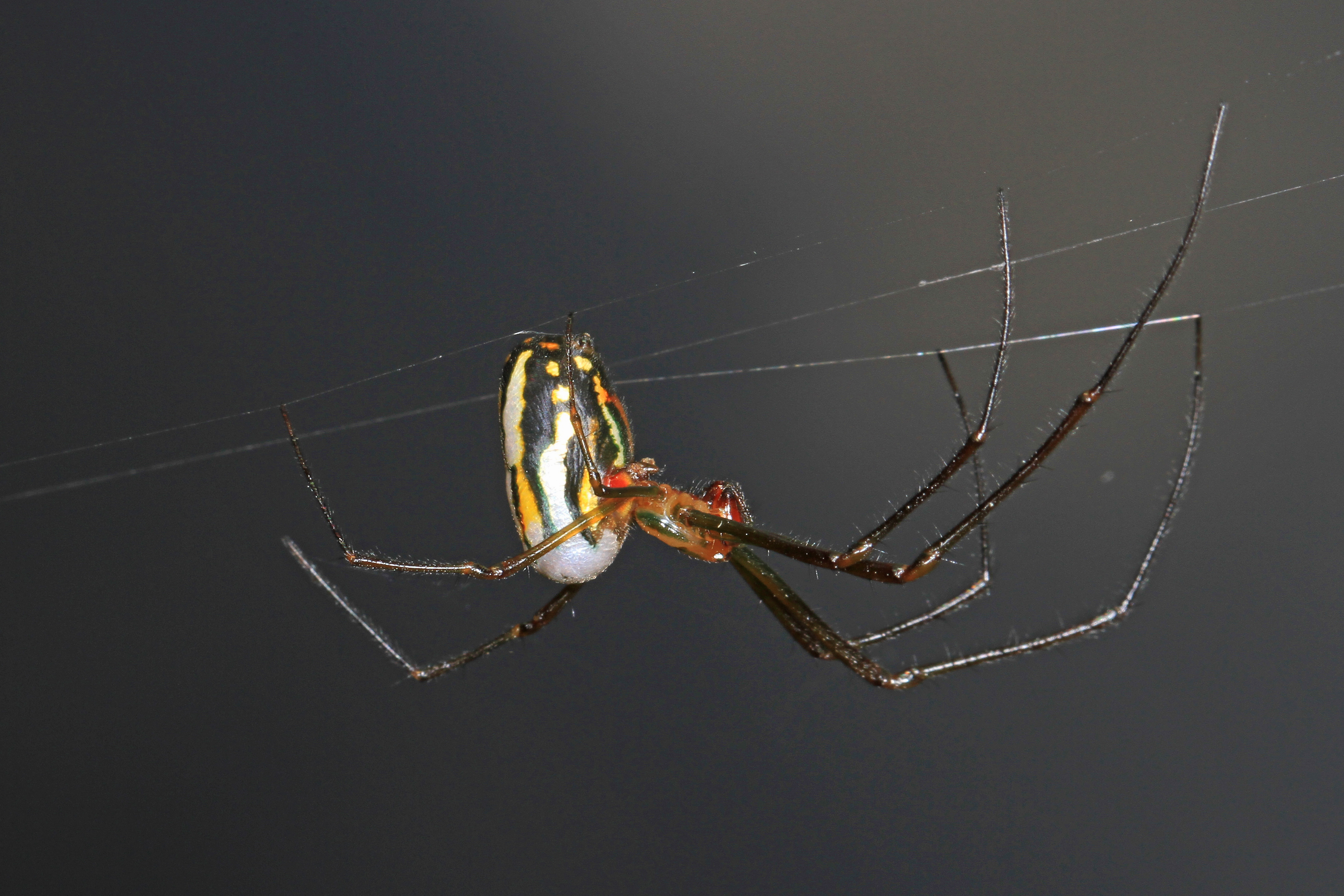
Female of L. argyra showing the projection of the epigyne (click to enlarge)

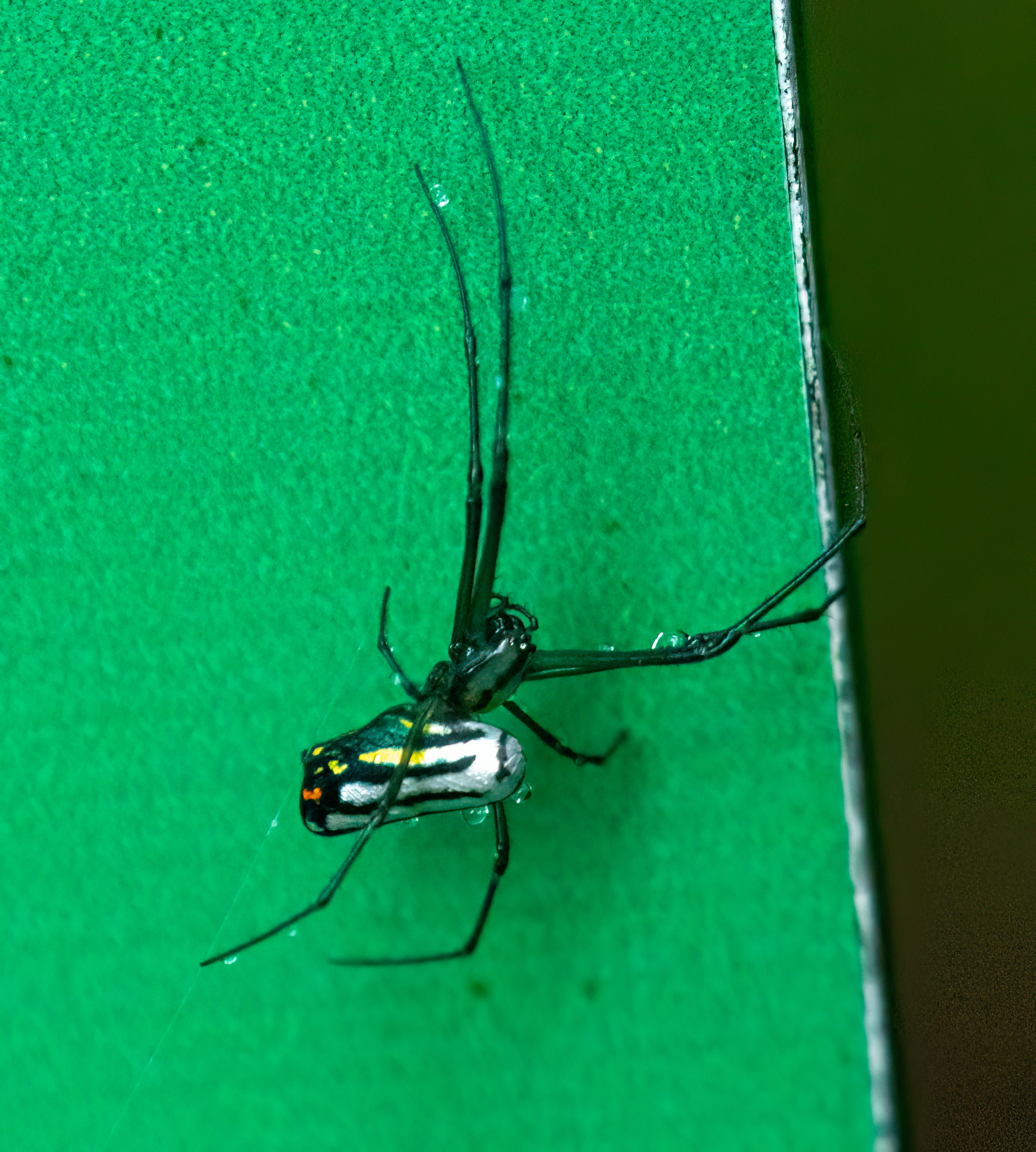
L. argyra in Costa Rica
