= Ampulex ferruginea =

Scientific classification
- Domain: Eukaryota
- Kingdom: Animalia
- Phylum: Arthropoda
- Class: Insecta
- Order: Hymenoptera
- Family: Ampulicidae
- Tribe: Ampulicini
- Genus: Ampulex
- Species: A. ferruginea

Binomial name
- Ampulex ferruginea Bradley, 1934

Species of wasp

Ampulex ferruginea is a species of cockroach wasp in the family Ampulicidae.
