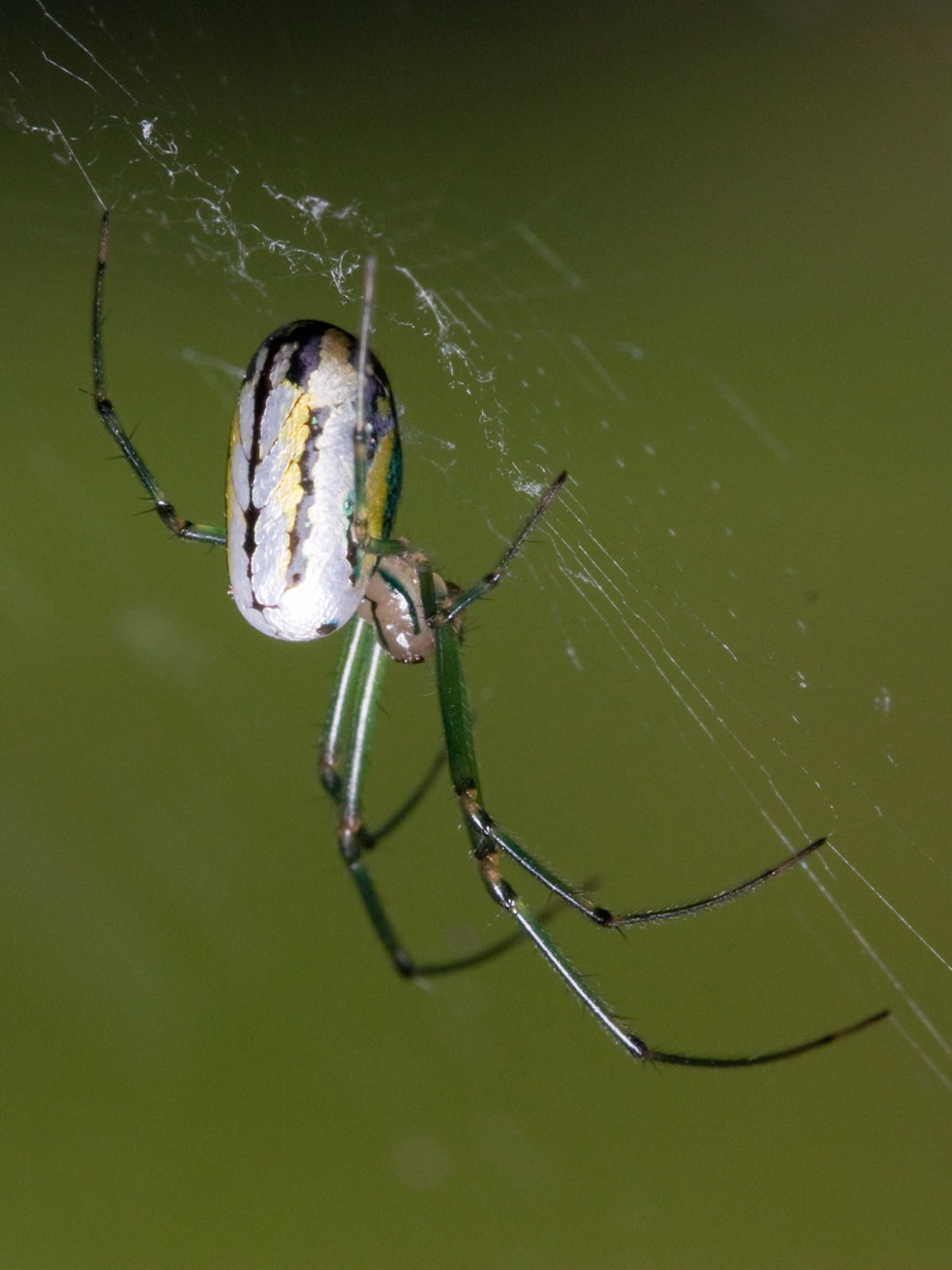
- Adult female

Scientific classification
- Domain: Eukaryota
- Kingdom: Animalia
- Phylum: Arthropoda
- Subphylum: Chelicerata
- Class: Arachnida
- Order: Araneae
- Infraorder: Araneomorphae
- Family: Tetragnathidae
- Genus: Leucauge
- Species: L. venusta

Binomial name
- Leucauge venusta (Walckenaer, 1842)

= Leucauge venusta =

Orchard spider

Species of spider

Leucauge venusta, known as the orchard orbweaver spider, is a long-jawed orbweaver spider that occurs from southern Canada to Colombia, along the East coast, reaching into the central US, also in South Asia. The web is often oriented horizontally, with the spider hanging down in the center.

It is distinctively colored, with leaf-green legs and sides (which can sometimes vary to a dark green or even orange). The underside of its thorax is spotted with yellow and black, the top is silvery with brown and black streaks. The neon yellow, orange or red spots on the rear of the abdomen are variable in size among individuals and sometimes absent.

This species is parasitised by a wasp larva which attaches itself externally at the junction of the cephalothorax and abdomen.

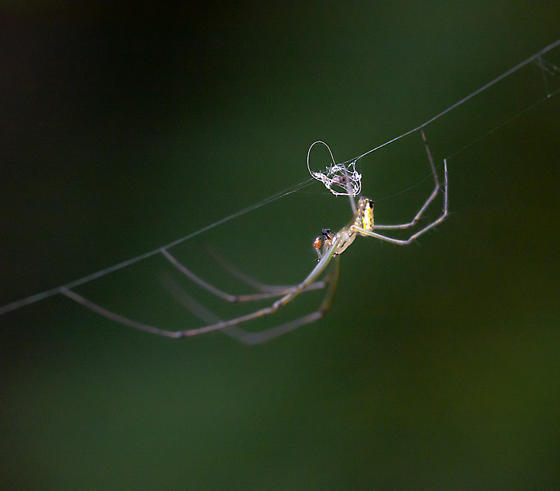
Male

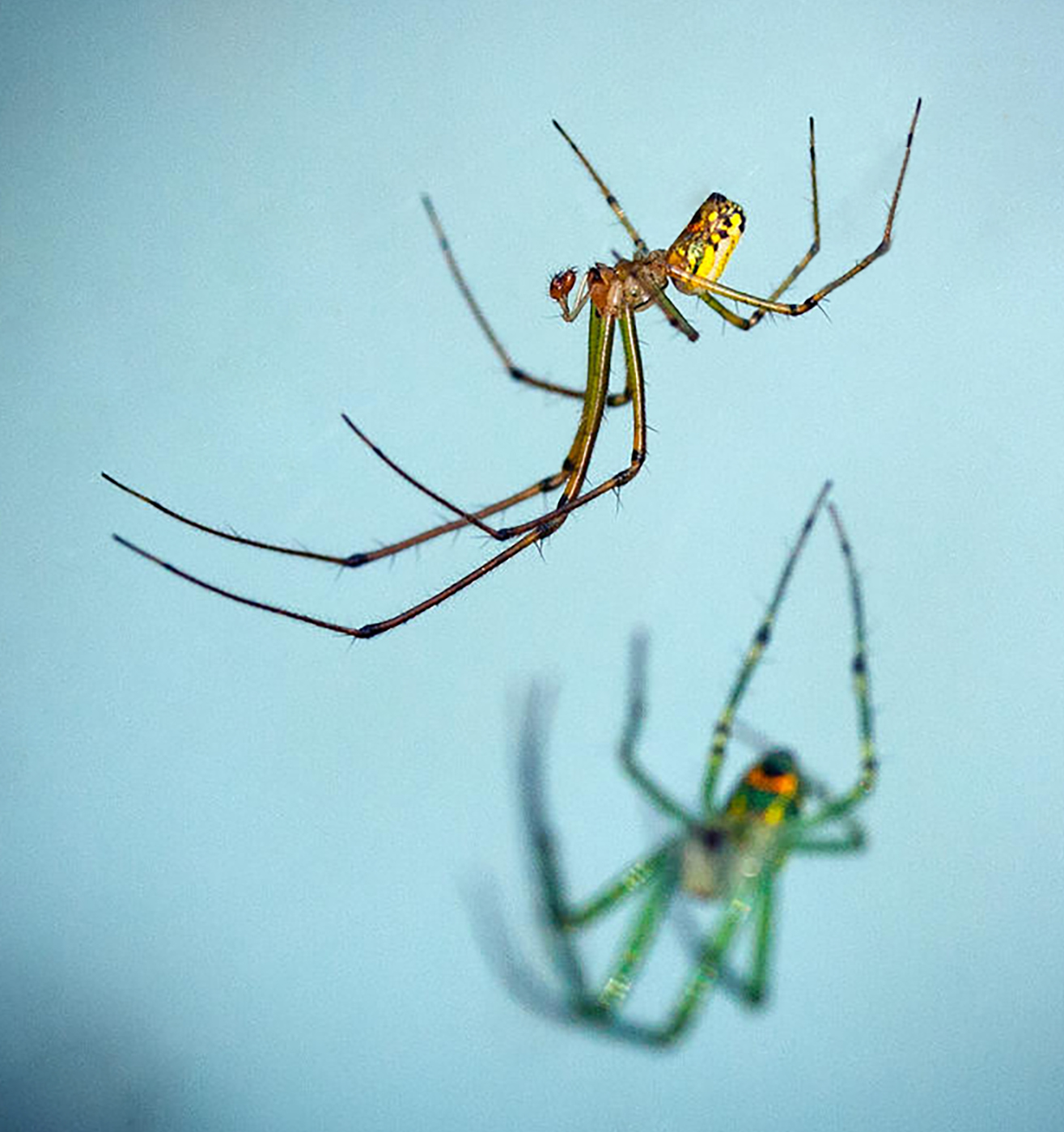
Orchard orbweaver (Leucauge venusta) male and female cohabitating

A similar species in the same genus is Leucauge mariana.

== Gallery ==
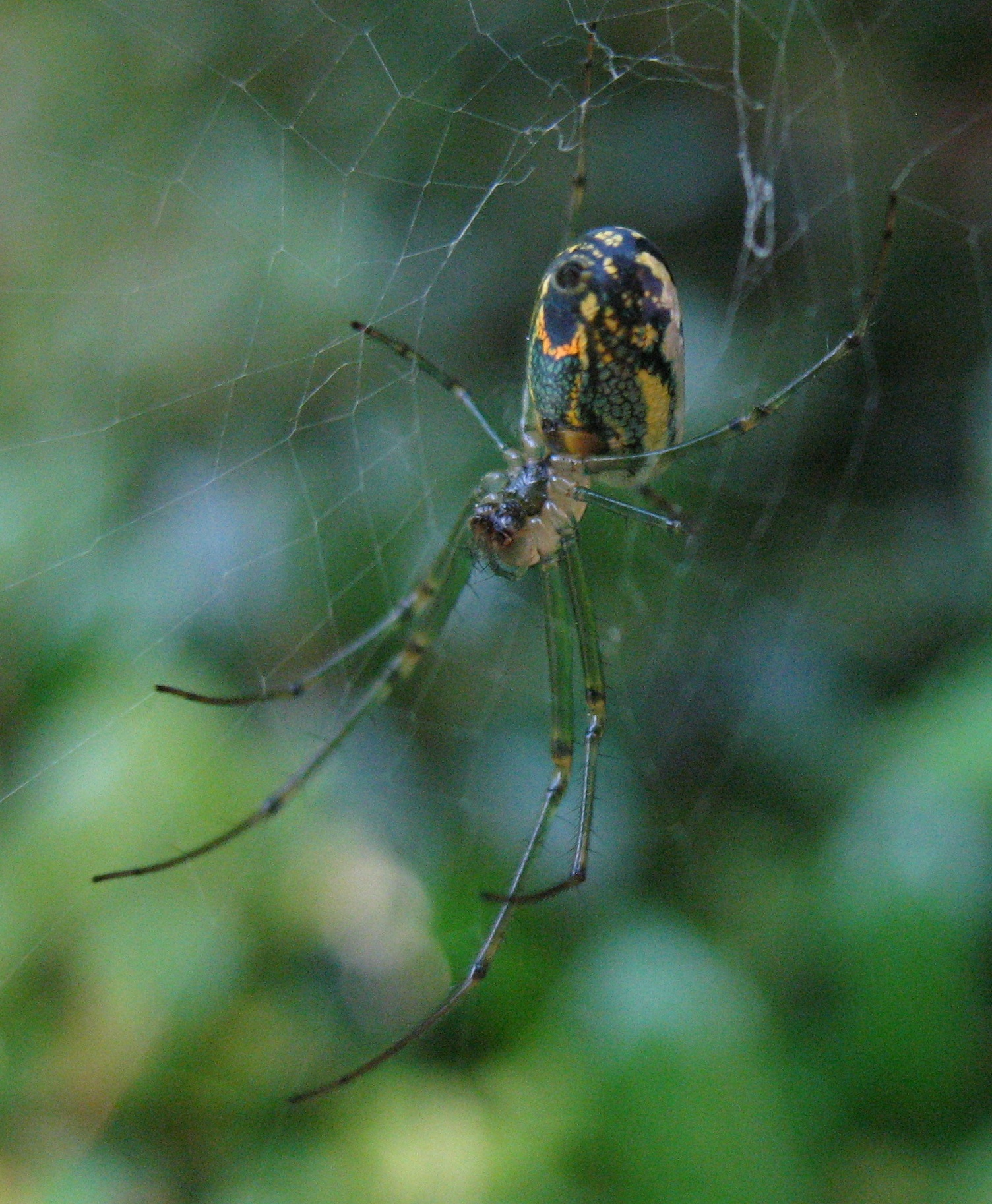

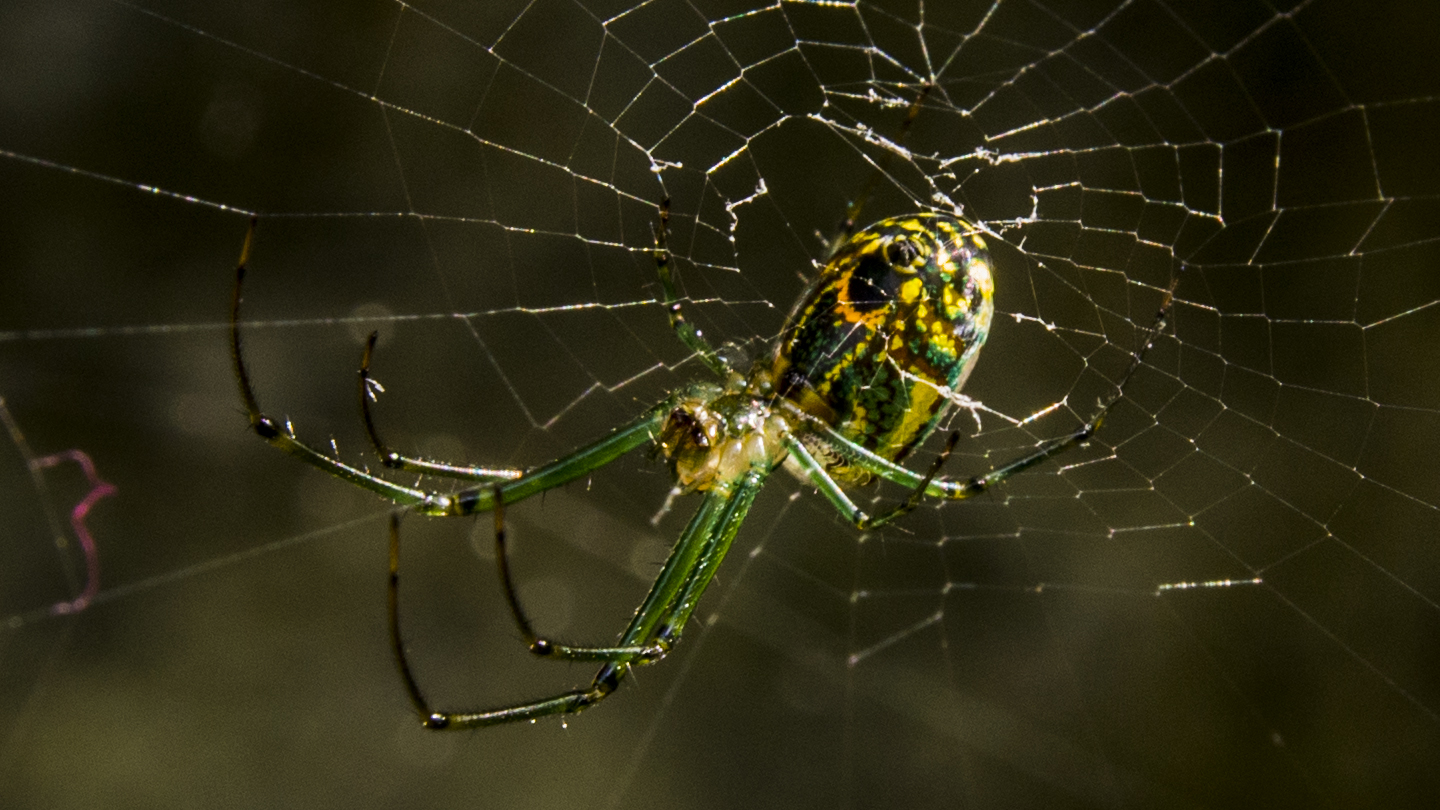

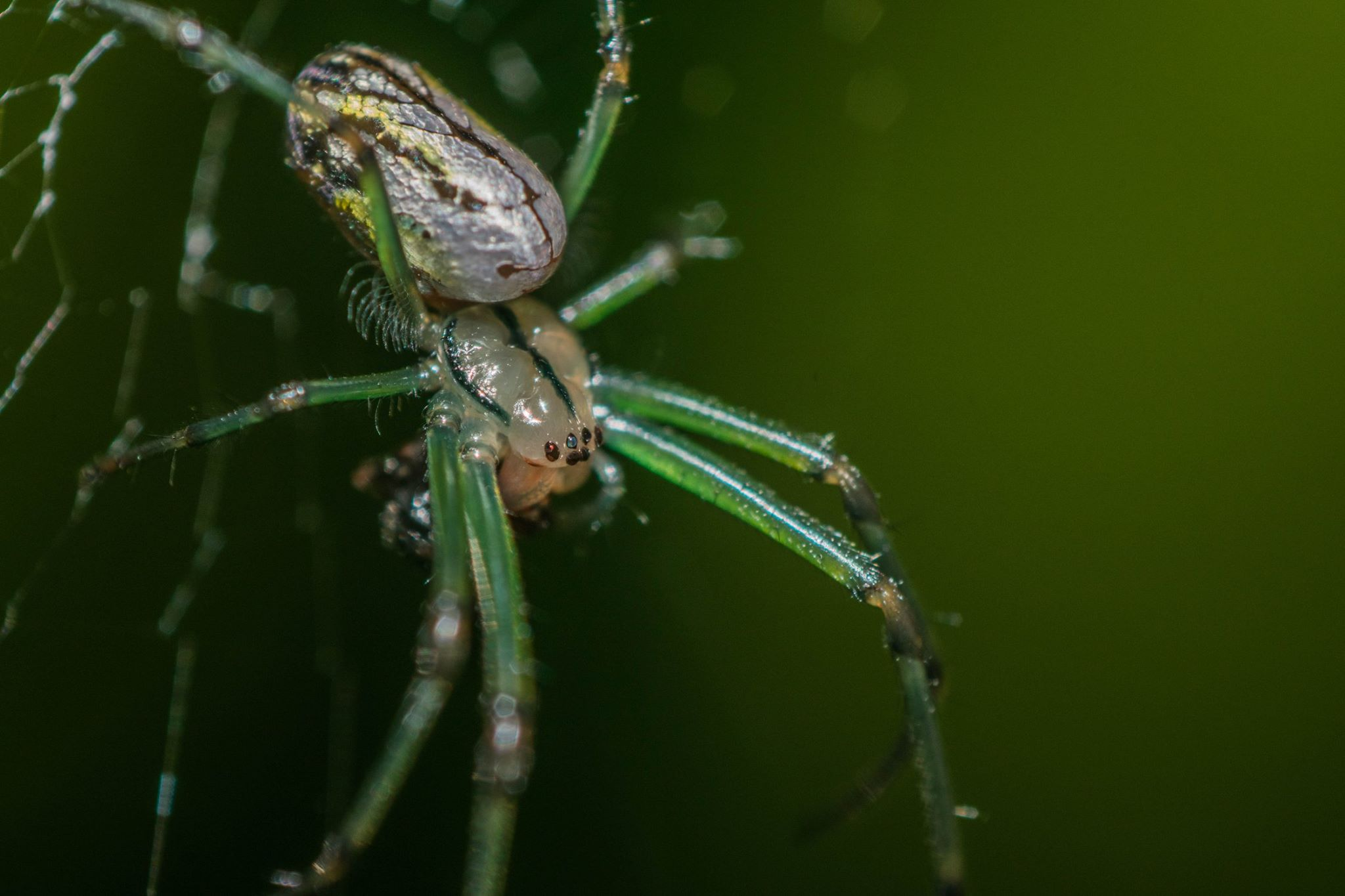

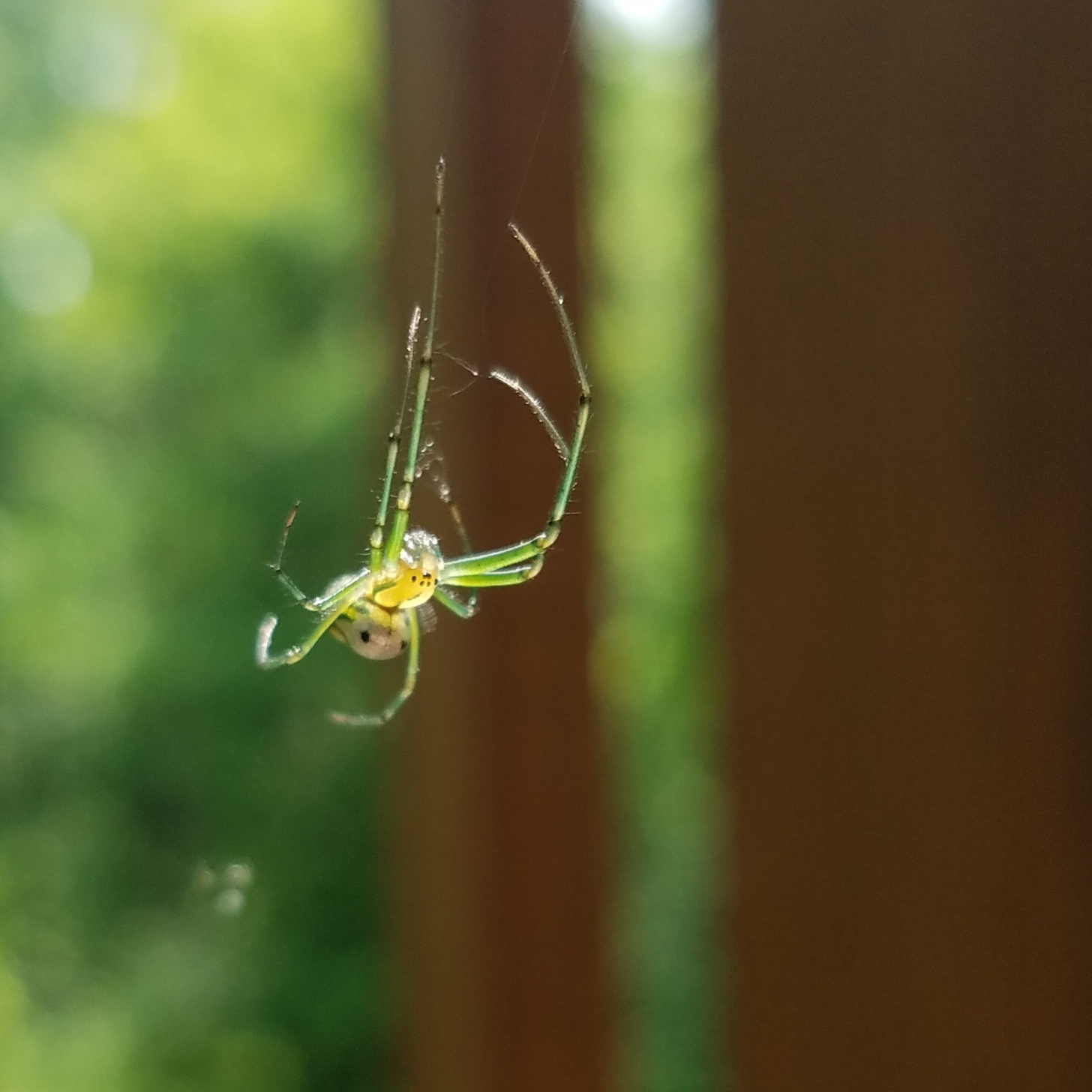

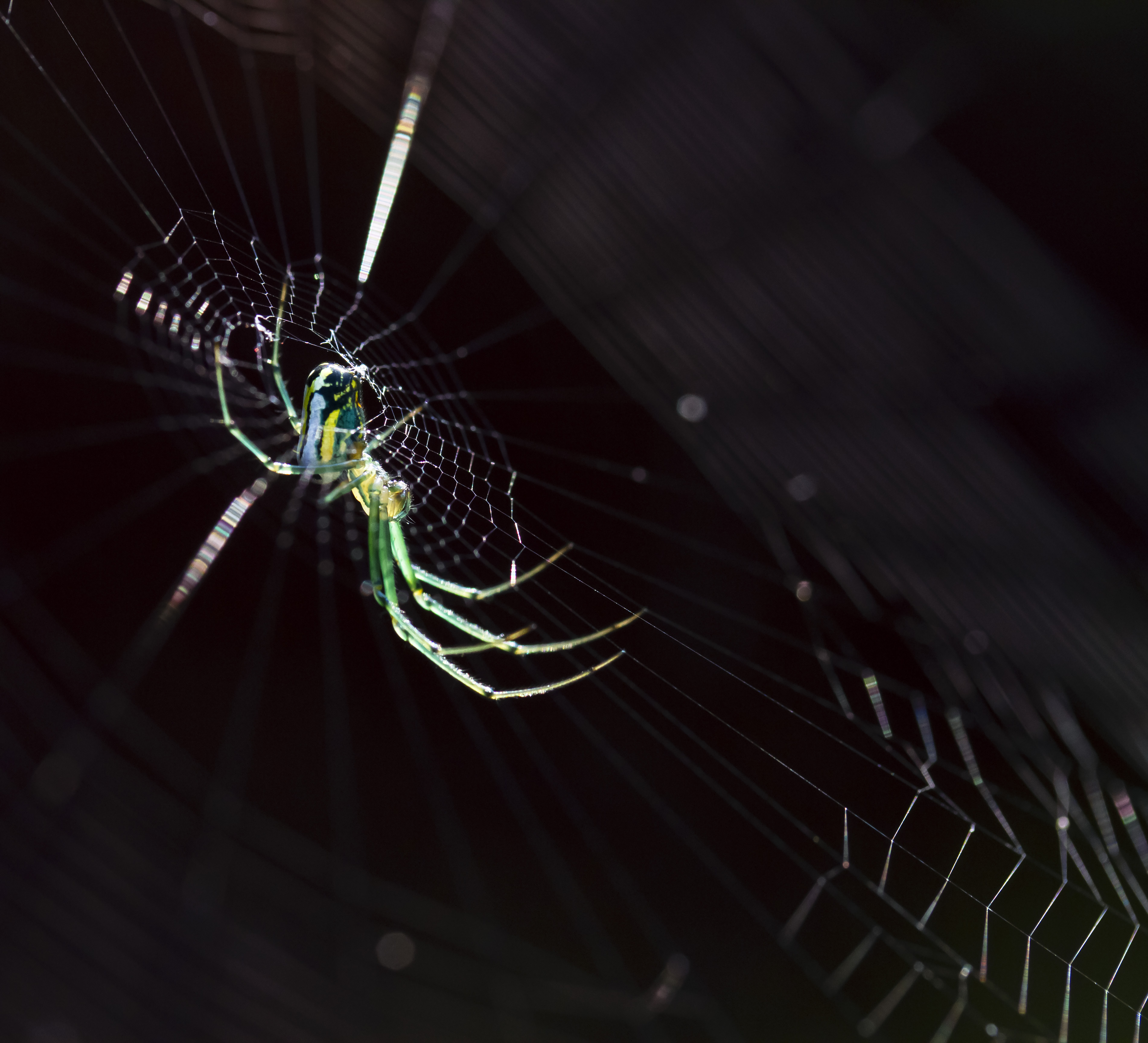
In web

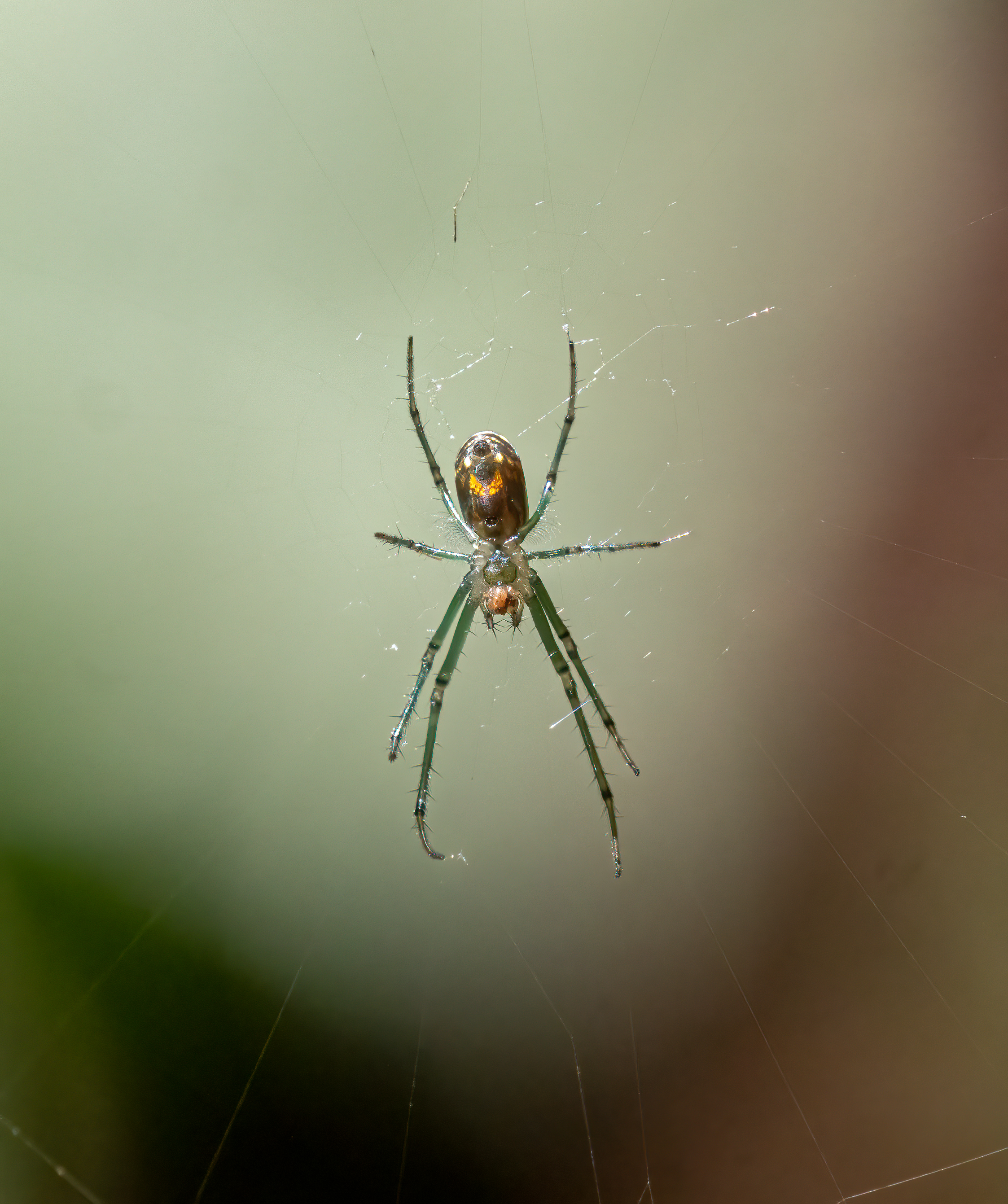
Juvenile in a web in New York
