= Ampulex canaliculata =

Scientific classification
- Kingdom: Animalia
- Phylum: Arthropoda
- Class: Insecta
- Order: Hymenoptera
- Family: Ampulicidae
- Genus: Ampulex
- Species: A. canaliculata

Binomial name
- Ampulex canaliculata Say, 1823

Synonyms
- Ampulex pensylvanica Westwood, 1844; Rhinopsis abbotti Haldeman, 1848; Rhinopsis melanognathus Rohwer, 1912

Species of wasp

Ampulex canaliculata is a species of cockroach wasp in the family Ampulicidae.
