= Dolichurus greenei =

Scientific classification
- Kingdom: Animalia
- Phylum: Arthropoda
- Class: Insecta
- Order: Hymenoptera
- Family: Ampulicidae
- Tribe: Dolichurini
- Genus: Dolichurus
- Species: D. greenei

Binomial name
- Dolichurus greenei Rohwer, 1916

Species of wasp

Dolichurus greenei is a species of cockroach wasp in the family Ampulicidae.
