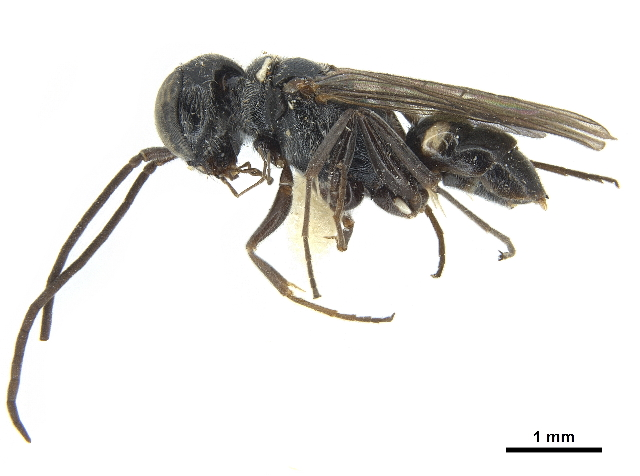
- Paradolichurus morelensis

Scientific classification
- Kingdom: Animalia
- Phylum: Arthropoda
- Class: Insecta
- Order: Hymenoptera
- Family: Ampulicidae
- Genus: Paradolichurus; Williams 1960

= Paradolichurus =

Genus of cockroach wasp

Paradolichurus is a genus of cockroach wasps found in the new world. It was originally only a subgenus of Dolichurus however it was elevated to a genus due to the absence of many external sulcus and hindwing jugal lobe showing significant evolutionary advancement. Members of this genus spend most of their time running on the ground making them difficult to collect because Malaise traps and nets are ineffective.

== Description ==
Members of the genus Paradolichurus have short mandibles and are black in color with females being red or brownish yellow in color on the back of their gasters. They are quite small only being 5-8mm with some species having whitish markings.

== Species ==
There are 4 described species of Paradolichurus:

- Paradolichurus boharti Kimsey, 1993
- Paradolichurus californicus (Williams, 1960)
- Paradolichurus morelensis (Williams, 1962)
- Paradolichurus obidensis (Ducke, 1903)
