= Dementor (disambiguation) =

A dementor is a type of evil being in the Harry Potter franchise.

Dementor may also refer to:

- Professor Dementor, a villain in the animated series Kim Possible
- Dementor, a character in the DC Comics universe and enemy of Guy Gardner
- Ampulex dementor, a species of cockroach wasp native to Thailand
- Dementor, a character in the film Jingle All the Way
