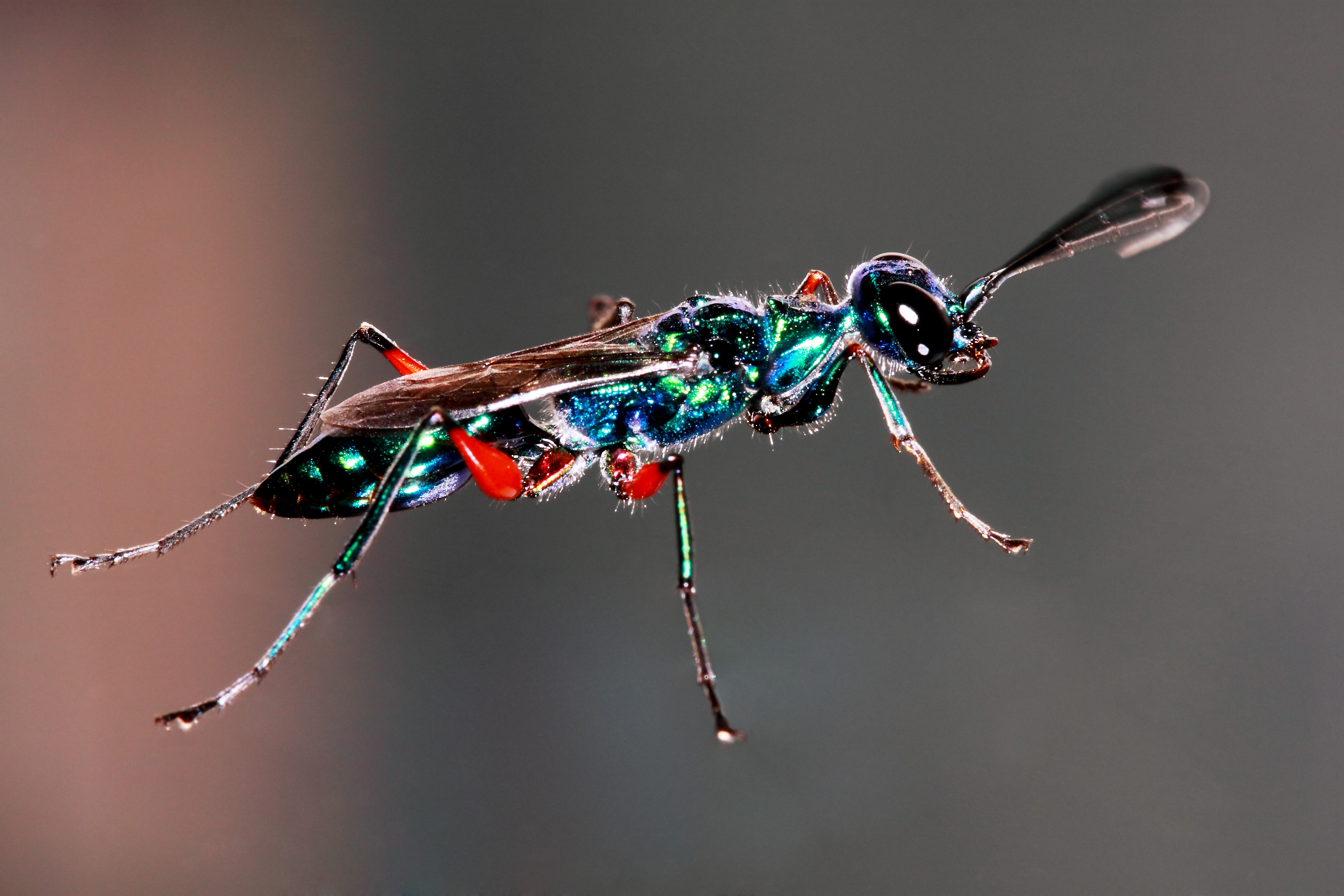

Scientific classification
- Kingdom: Animalia
- Phylum: Arthropoda
- Clade: Pancrustacea
- Class: Insecta
- Order: Hymenoptera
- Family: Ampulicidae
- Genus: Ampulex
- Species: A. compressa

Binomial name
- Ampulex compressa (Fabricius, 1781)

Synonyms
- Ampulex sinensis Saussure, 1867; Chlorampulex striolata Saussure, 1892; Sphex compressus Fabricius, 1781

= Emerald cockroach wasp =

Species of wasp

The emerald cockroach wasp, jewel wasp, or emerald jewel wasp (Ampulex compressa) is a solitary wasp of the family Ampulicidae. It is known for its unusual reproductive behavior, which involves leading a cockroach into a dug burrow and using it as a host for its larvae. It thus belongs to the entomophagous parasites.

== Distribution ==
The wasp is mostly found in the tropical regions of Africa, South Asia, Southeast Asia, and the Pacific islands. The flying wasps are more abundant in the warm seasons of the year.

A. compressa was introduced to Hawaii by F.X. Williams in 1941 as a method of biocontrol. This has been unsuccessful because of the territorial tendencies of the wasp and the small scale on which they hunt.

The species is also found in the Brazilian states of São Paulo and Rio de Janeiro. A. compressa likely arrived in the country through the ports of Santos and Rio de Janeiro.

== Description ==
The wasp has a metallic blue-green body, with the thighs of the second and third pair of legs red. The female is about 22 mm long; the male is smaller and lacks a stinger. Males can be less than half of a female in size if emerging from a smaller or a superparasitized host. The species undergoes four larval stages, where the initial younger larvae can be seen as external hemolymph-feeders on the paralysed roach's leg, and the last instar feeds internally. Upon pupation it produces a chocolate-coloured, thick, spindle-shaped cocoon which can be found inside the dead cockroach within the burrow.

== Reproductive behavior and lifecycle ==
Female wasps of this species were reported to sting a cockroach (specifically a Periplaneta americana, Periplaneta australasiae, or Nauphoeta rhombifolia) twice, delivering venom. Researchers, using radioactive labeling, demonstrated that the wasp stings precisely into specific ganglia of the roach. It delivers an initial sting to a thoracic ganglion and injects venom to mildly and reversibly paralyze the front legs of its victim. A biochemically-induced transient paralysis takes over the cockroach, where the temporary loss of mobility facilitates the second venomous sting at a precise spot in the victim's head ganglia (brain), in the section that controls the escape reflex. As a result of this sting, the roach will first groom extensively, and then become sluggish and fail to show normal escape responses. The venom is reported to block receptors for the neurotransmitter octopamine.

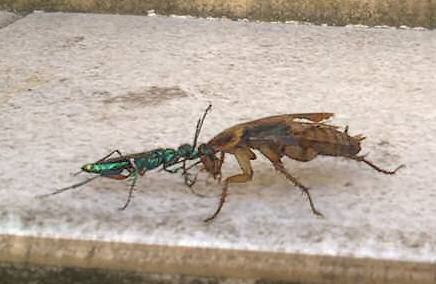
Wasp 'walking' a roach

Once the host is incapacitated, the wasp proceeds to chew off half of each of the roach's antennae, after which it carefully feeds from exuding hemolymph. The wasp, which is too small to carry the roach, then leads the victim to the wasp's burrow, by pulling one of the roach's antennae in a manner similar to a leash. In the burrow, the wasp will lay one or two white eggs, about 2 mm long, between the roach's legs. It then exits and proceeds to fill in the burrow entrance with any surrounding debris, more to keep other predators and competitors out than to keep the roach in.

With its escape reflex disabled, the stung roach simply rests in the burrow as the wasp's egg hatches after about 3 days. The hatched larva lives and feeds for 4–5 days on the roach, then chews its way into its abdomen and proceeds to live as an endoparasitoid. Over a period of 8 days, the final-instar larva will consume the roach's internal organs, finally killing its host, and enters the pupal stage inside a cocoon in the roach's body. Eventually, the fully grown wasp emerges from the roach's body to begin its adult life. Development is faster in the warm season.

Adults live for several months. Mating takes about a minute, and only one mating is necessary for a female wasp to successfully parasitize several dozen roaches.

While a number of venomous animals paralyze prey as live food for their young, A. compressa is different in that it initially leaves the roach mobile and modifies its behavior in a unique way. Several other species of the genus Ampulex show a similar behavior of preying on cockroaches. The wasp's predation appears only to affect the cockroach's escape responses. While a stung roach exhibits drastically reduced survival instincts (such as swimming or avoiding pain) for about 72 hours, motor abilities such as flight or flipping over are unimpaired.

== Biomechanics ==
The first sting is delivered to the prothoracic ganglion (mass of nerve tissue) which causes a 2- to 3-minute paralysis of the front legs. This sting injects significant quantities of γ amino-butyric acid (GABA) and complementary agonists taurine and β alanine. The concoction temporarily blocks the motor action potentials in the prothoracic ganglion by depressing cholinergic transmission through the increased chloride conductance across nerve synapses. Individually, all of these substances induce short-term paralysis of the cockroach. When they are injected together in a ratio of 10:7:4, the effect is longer lasting. GABA activates ligand-gated chloride channels by binding to GABA receptors. Taurine and beta-alanine likely extend the duration of the paralytic effect by slowing the uptake of GABA by the synaptic cleft. Combined, this cocktail of compounds prevents the cockroach from moving and defending itself while the wasp administers the second sting/series of stings.

The second sting is administered to the subesophageal ganglion (SEG) and the supraesophageal ganglion (SupOG) and is much more precise, hence the need for paralysis. It is also significantly longer. The wasp actively searches for the SEG during this sting. The second sting inhibits the cockroach's ability to walk spontaneously or of its own will, but cockroaches can right themselves and swim while under the influence, and when startled, will jump but not run. It also causes excessive grooming and alterations in the metabolism of the cockroach. The metabolic change is thought to preserve nutrients for the wasp larva. Researchers have simulated this zombie state by injecting procaine into the SEG. They also determined using extracellular bipolar electrodes that neuronal activity was less in stung cockroaches. The venom may disturb the octopaminergic modulation in structures within the roach's ganglion. Basically, it limits the effectiveness of octopamine, the neurotransmitter that controls muscle contraction in sudden movements.

== See also ==
- Ampulex dementor, a species of cockroach wasp from Thailand with very similar behavior but different appearance
- Glyptapanteles, a genus of wasps capable of inducing caterpillars to guard its pupae
- Hymenoepimecis argyraphaga, a species of wasp that affect the web-building behavior of spiders to its own ends
- Tarantula hawk
- Behavior-altering parasite or parasitoid
