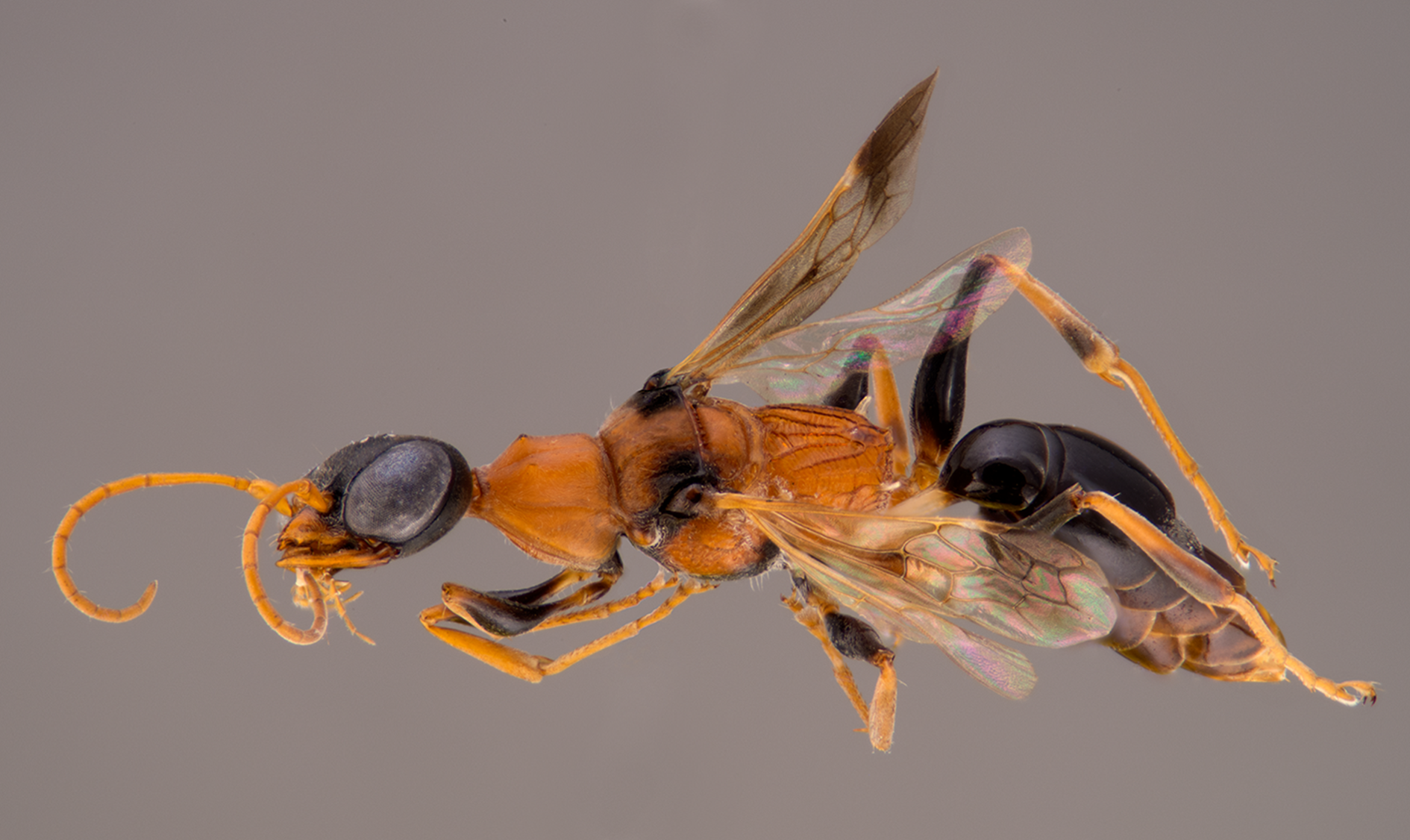
- Female holotype

Scientific classification
- Kingdom: Animalia
- Phylum: Arthropoda
- Class: Insecta
- Order: Hymenoptera
- Family: Ampulicidae
- Genus: Ampulex
- Species: A. dementor

Binomial name
- Ampulex dementor Ohl, 2014

= Ampulex dementor =

Species of wasp

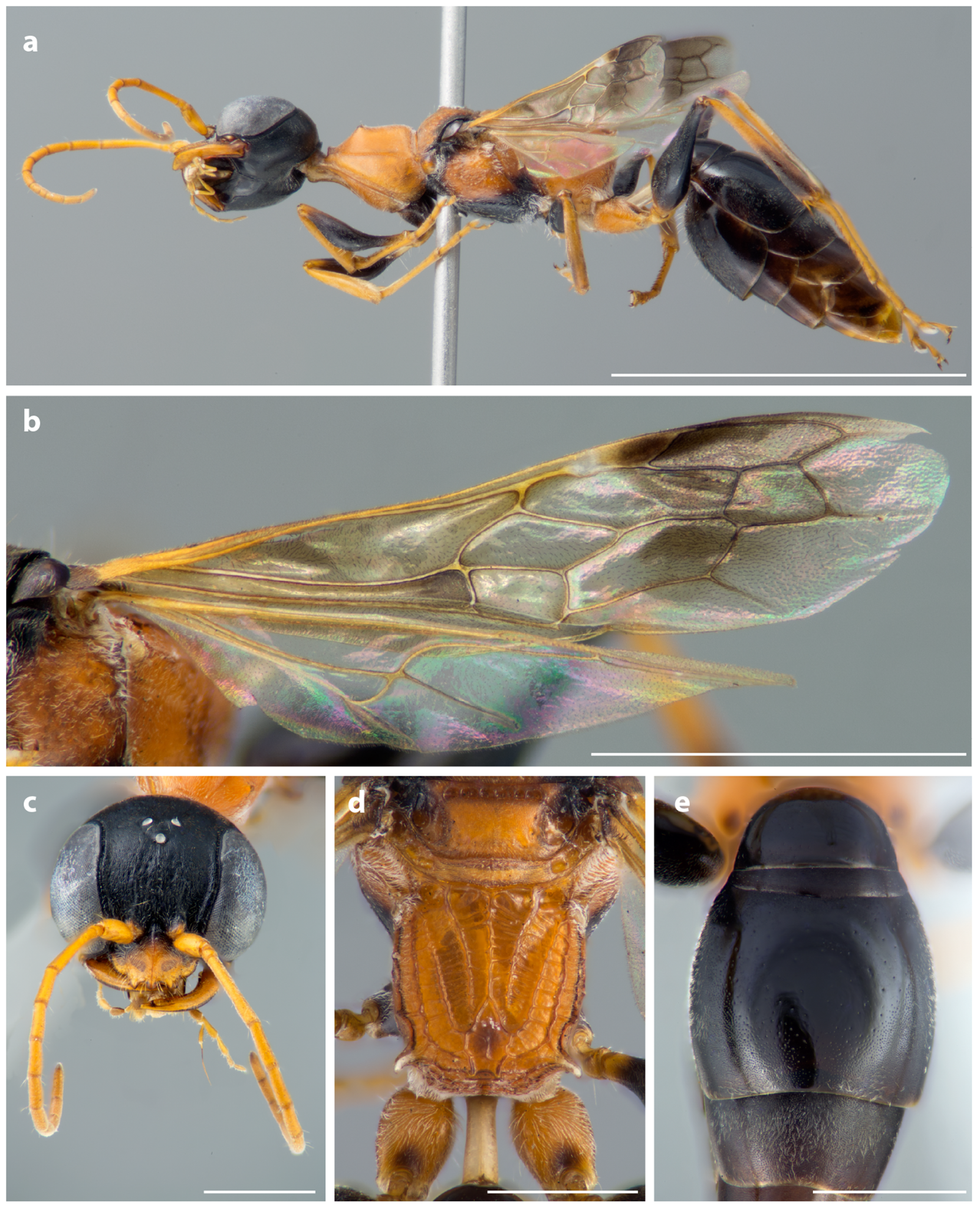
Anatomical details of A. dementor

Ampulex dementor, commonly known as the dementor wasp, is a species of cockroach wasp native to Thailand, described in 2014 by Michael Ohl of the Museum für Naturkunde in Berlin, Germany. The species name was selected by visitors to the museum in an effort to raise awareness among the public of issues in taxonomy and the description of biodiversity.

== Description ==
A. dementor is colored in red and black. Its mandibles and most of its clypeus, prothorax, mesothorax, and posterolateral areas are all light red, while its abdomen and much of its head is black. Its wings are slightly yellow. It has long, slender legs, and a tubular petiole, as long as the tergum. Of about 170 species in the family Ampulicidae, Ampulex dementor is the largest. The length of females varies between 9.6 and 10.9 mm; the length of males is uncharacterized.

== Behavior ==
The wasp has an unusual behavior towards cockroaches. As it stings its prey, it releases a toxin into the victim's neural nodes. This toxin blocks the cockroach's octopamine receptors, leaving the cockroach alive, but docile and with impaired motility. By prodding with its antennae, the predator then escorts its victim into the wasp's nest, where it can be dispatched more easily.

== Etymology ==
At the time of the wasp's description, visitors to the Museum für Naturkunde (in which the species was described) were asked through pamphlet distribution to choose between four names, the third of which was ultimately chosen:

- Ampulex bicolor (the Latin word means 'two colors', from bis = twice) due to its very distinctive colours, black and red
- Ampulex mon, an allusion to its origin, Thailand, and the Mon people, one of the earliest ethnic groups to live there
- Ampulex dementor, referring to its behavioral resemblance to the Dementors, fictional creatures from the Harry Potter Books franchise, who suck the soul from their prey, leaving an empty body with neither thoughts nor emotions, somewhat as the wasp does
- Ampulex plagiator, because the species is an ant mimic, in particular 'copying' the general appearance and movement of an ant, thus making it a plagiarist in this regard

== See also ==
- The emerald cockroach wasp, a bright green metallic wasp with very similar behavior.
