= Hymenoepimecis argyraphaga =

Scientific classification
- Kingdom: Animalia
- Phylum: Arthropoda
- Clade: Pancrustacea
- Class: Insecta
- Order: Hymenoptera
- Family: Ichneumonidae
- Genus: Hymenoepimecis
- Species: H. argyraphaga

Binomial name
- Hymenoepimecis argyraphaga Gauld, 2000

Species of wasp

Hymenoepimecis argyraphaga is a Costa Rican parasitoid wasp whose host is the spider Leucauge argyra. The wasp is unusual in modifying the spider's web building behavior to make a web made of very strong lines designed to support the wasp's cocoon without breaking in the rain.

== Habitat ==
Hymenoepimecis argyraphaga is indigenous to Costa Rica. Its ideal habitat would include good sources of food, mating sites, and a stable population of their host spider. This parasitic wasp feeds on sugar and nectar and tends to be near heavy vegetation. The wasp prefers heavy vegetation because this provides both protection during development and a good mating site, as the wasps mate on tips of leaves. Heavy vegetation provides thick undergrowth where the spider can spin their webs providing protection from heavy rains and winds.

== Reproduction ==
Hymenoepimecis argyraphaga wasps have a haplodiploid genetic system, meaning unfertilized eggs will become males and fertilized eggs will become females. Wasp reproduction ratios can change based on seasonal changes and environmental stress. Depending on these factors, the egg will either be fertilized or be unfertilized. Males seek out females for reproduction, but seem to fly in random patterns above the undergrowth. They encounter females after they emerge from their cocoons and leave the underbrush. While the males seem to fly in random patterns, they locate the females within minutes, suggesting a long range pheromone. The male will land on the female and copulate which takes roughly 10 seconds. There has been no observed aggression between wasps when reproducing.

== Development ==
After copulation, the female wasp must find a host for her egg. First she must immobilize the host using venom from her ovipositor. This can be done in two different ways, she could either use a method of attack or a deceiving method. For the method of attack, the wasp would hover over its host until it had an opening to swing down and capture it by threading its legs through the web to tightly pin down the host. It would then jab the host repeatedly with the ovipositor, while injecting the host with venom. For the deceiving method, the wasp would act as if it was caught in the spiders web and lay still on its back. When the spider approaches, the wasp will grab onto the host and sting repeatedly until the spider stops struggling so the wasp can insert the ovipositor into the spider's cephalothorax and continuously sting for 2 minutes. Once the host is paralyzed, the wasp has 5-10 minutes until the paralysis wears off. The wasp will then use the ovipositor to probe for existing eggs or larvae in the spider, and if she finds any, she will remove them to replace with her own egg. The egg is glued to the abdomen of the spider. 2-3 days later the first-instar larva will hatch, and partially emerge from the egg. The first instar will create a large hole in the spider's abdomen in order to access the hemolymph. The larva will then feed on the hemolymph, creating a hardened saddle. During this time, the spider goes on about its normal web building and insect-catching behavior for the next one to two weeks. In another 2-3 days the second-instar larva will hatch and insert its hook-like structure into the hemolymph saddle and completely emerges from its egg. When the larva is ready to pupate, it releases a chemical induction that causes the host to spin a special web to make a cocoon for the larva, the design of which is completely different from any it has ever made, and then to sit motionless in the middle of this web. Even if the larva is removed prior to the web-building process, the spider still engages in aberrant web-spinning. Once the cocoon has been made the larva will kill its host and pupate. Seven days later metamorphosis happens and the wasp will live for 2-3 weeks.

== Behavior alterations of Plesiometa argyra ==
Normal web weaving consists of several steps:

1. Build non-sticky frame lines attached to supporting objects and a few initial radial lines. This process sometimes involves establishing connections with surrounding objects by floating a line in the wind and hoping it catches somewhere.
2. Add more non-sticky radial lines attached to these frame lines, in some cases adding at the same time less peripheral, "secondary" frame lines.
3. Add several tight loops of non-sticky silk at the hub of the web.
4. Lay a loose "temporary" spiral of non-sticky silk, starting near the hub and ending near the edge of the web with about five times the spacing of the final sticky silk.
5. Draw the tight spiral of sticky silk starting at the edge of the web and working inward, and removing during the same process the loose spiral.
6. Remove lines at the center of the hub, leaving a hole or (in some species) replacing them with other lines

The modified web that the larva causes the spider to build consists of several heavily reinforced radial lines that are attached directly to the substrate; sometimes one or more frame lines or vestiges of a "temporary" spiral are also included. The reinforced lines are built using a subset of the same sequence of movements that the spider performs during the construction of frame lines in the normal web, repeated many times over. Thus the larva appears to be able to induce very specific behavioral responses in the spider.

The lifecycle of the wasp was filmed for the BBC series Life in the Undergrowth (programme 4 in the series, Intimate Relations).

== See also ==
- Glyptapanteles, a genus of parasitoid wasp with a similar larval capacity to manipulate hosts to its own ends.
- Ampulex compressa, or the "emerald cockroach wasp", a wasp capable of debilitating cockroaches into serving as docile hosts for its eggs.
