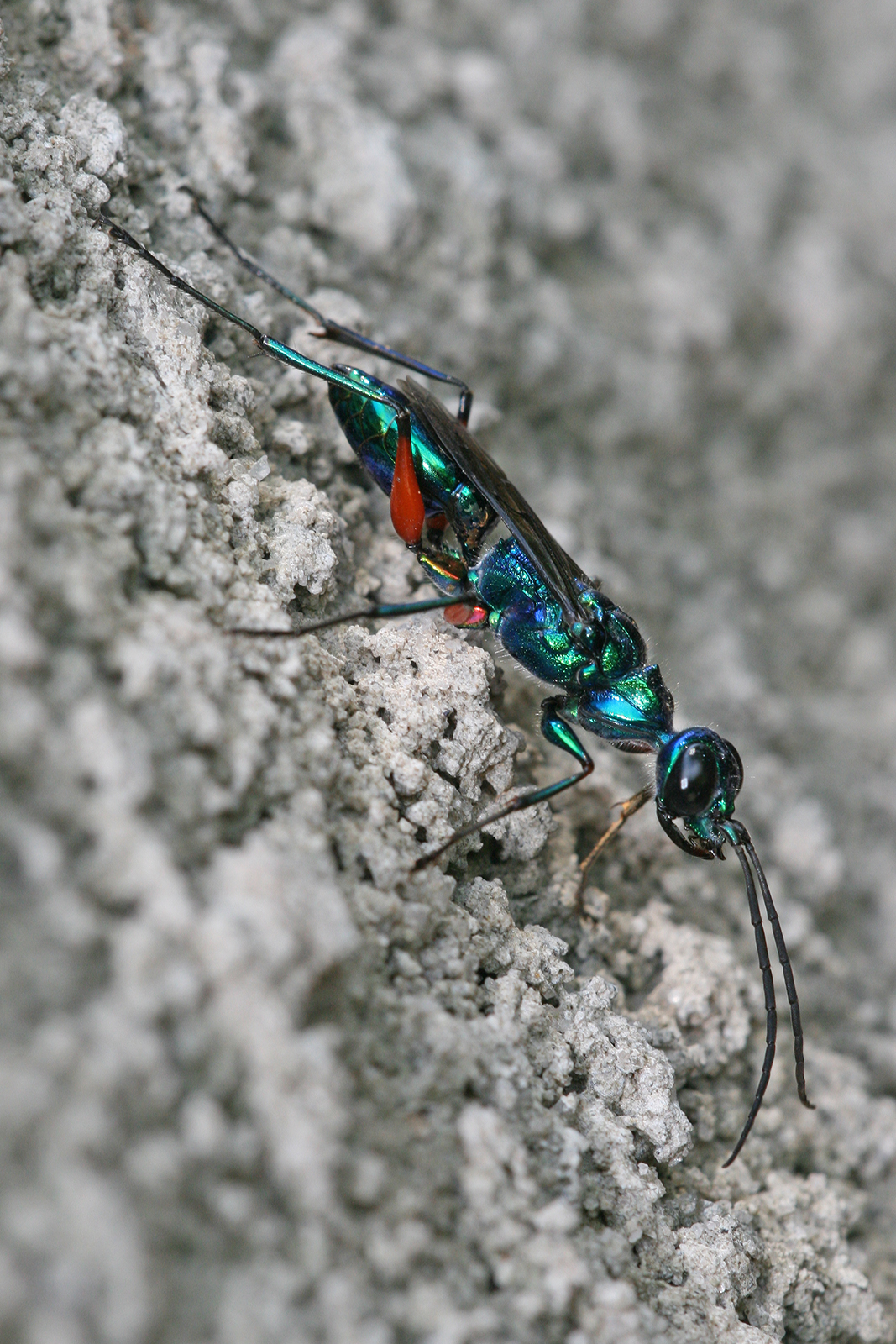
- Ampulex compressa

Scientific classification
- Kingdom: Animalia
- Phylum: Arthropoda
- Class: Insecta
- Order: Hymenoptera
- Family: Ampulicidae
- Tribe: Ampulicini
- Genus: Ampulex; Jurine, 1807

Type species
- Ampulex compressa (Fabricius, 1781)

Species
- >130 species

= Ampulex =

Genus of wasps

Ampulex is a large cosmopolitan genus of wasps belonging to the family Ampulicidae. Most of the >130 species occur in the tropics, particularly in the Old World, and fewer than 15 are known from the New World; fewer than 5 species are native to Europe or the United States, though the Old World species Ampulex compressa has spread to virtually everywhere that its host roaches (esp. the genus Periplaneta) can be found. The few species whose biology is known are parasitoids of cockroaches; they typically inject venom into the roach that subdues or immobilizes it, and then lay one to two eggs between the legs of the defenseless roach.

== Selected species ==
- Ampulex canaliculata Say, 1823
- Ampulex compressa (Fabricius, 1781) – jewel wasp or emerald cockroach wasp
- Ampulex dementor Ohl, 2014
- Ampulex fasciata Jurine, 1807
- Ampulex ferruginea Bradley, 1934
- Ampulex ruficollis Cameron, 1888

For further species see ITIS.
