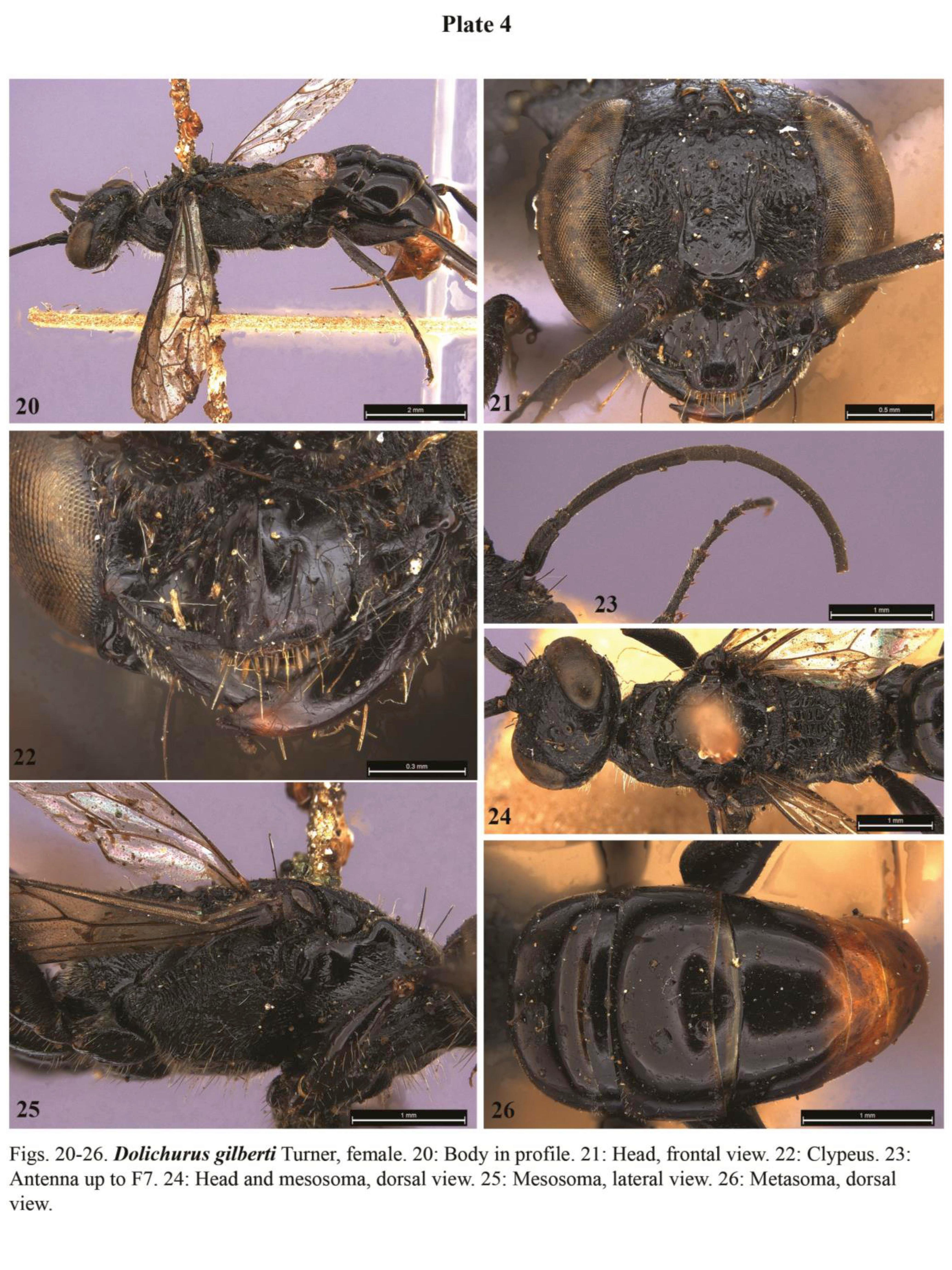
- Dolichurus gilberti

Scientific classification
- Kingdom: Animalia
- Phylum: Arthropoda
- Clade: Pancrustacea
- Class: Insecta
- Order: Hymenoptera
- Family: Ampulicidae
- Subfamily: Dolichurinae
- Tribe: Dolichurini
- Genus: Dolichurus; Latreille, 1809

Synonyms
- Thyreosphex Ashmead, 1904

= Dolichurus =

Genus of wasps

Dolichurus is a genus of cockroach wasps that are generally found on dead wood, leaf litter, or on tree trunks. There are at least 50 described species in Dolichurus.

These wasps are small in size (5-13 mm long) with an elongate body and slender appendages; legs are modified for running. Sexual dimorphism is not marked; antennae have 12 segments in females and 13 segments in males; females have six visible metasomal segments and males usually have only three visible segments. In females metasomal punctures are usually fine, almost impunctate with very sparse delicate punctures (surface glossy) but the metasomal punctures of males are usually coarser.

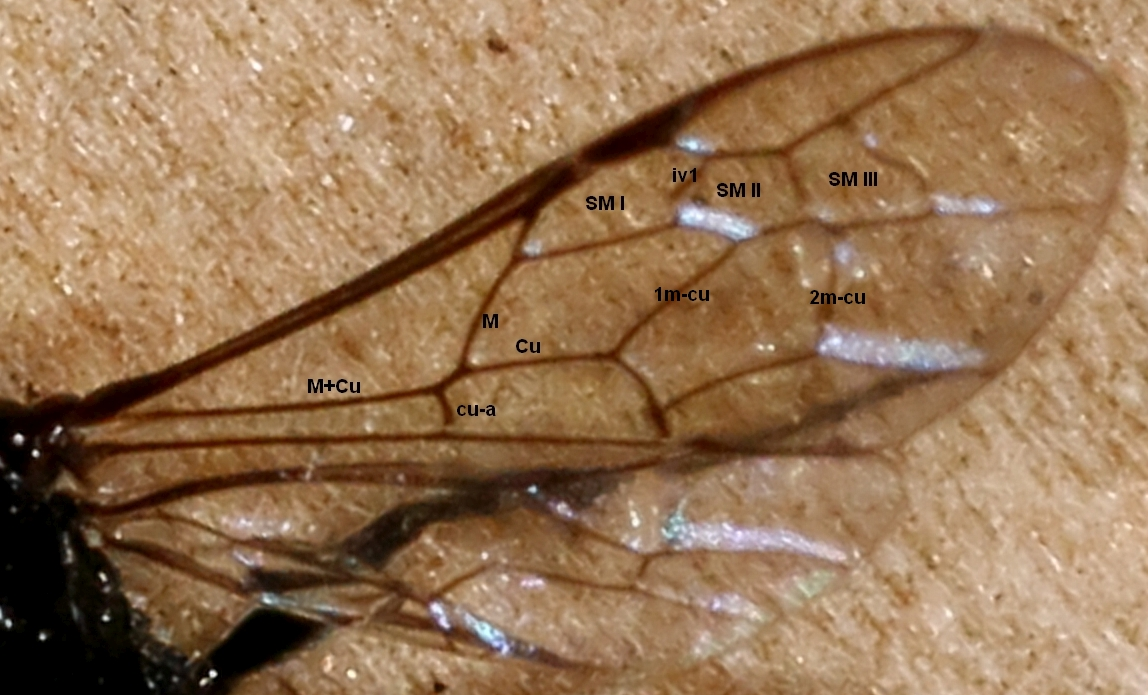
Dolichurus forewing: Veins M and Cu diverge from M+Cu well after cu-a; the first intersubmarginal veinlet (iv1) is angled; there are three submarginal cells (SM I - SM III); the first recurrent vein (1m-cu) is received by SM II, and the second (2m-cu) by SM III.

Diagnostic characters of Dolichurus include a complete antennal platform that is not grooved or divided, and the absence of metallic coloration. The forewing has veins M and Cu diverging from M+Cu well after cu-a; there are three submarginal cells of which SM I is much less than twice as long as SM II measured along posterior side; the first intersubmarginal veinlet (iv1) is angled; submarginal cell SM III is trapezoidal to nearly triangular; the first recurrent vein (1m-cu) is received by SM II, and the second (2m-cu) by SM III. Many species have whitish marks on the clypeus, mandible, frons, and collar.

This is a cosmopolitan genus with about 50 species worldwide (Nearctic 1, Neotropical 2, Palearctic 6, Ethiopian 10, Oriental 27, and Australian 4).

Latreille (1809) erected the genus Dolichurus (Hymenoptera: Ampulicidae) based on the type species Pompilus corniculus Spinola, 1808.

== Species ==
These 50 species belong to the genus Dolichurus:

- Dolichurus abbreviatus Strand, 1913
- Dolichurus abdominalis F. Smith, 1860
- Dolichurus albifacies Krombein, 1979
- Dolichurus alorus Nagy, 1971
- Dolichurus amamiensis Tsuneki & Iida, 1964
- Dolichurus apiciornatus Tsuneki, 1977
- Dolichurus aposanus Tsuneki in Tsuneki et al., 1992
- Dolichurus aridulus Krombein, 1979
- Dolichurus astos Ohl, 2002
- Dolichurus baguionis Tsuneki in Tsuneki et al., 1992
- Dolichurus basuto Arnold, 1952
- Dolichurus bicolor Lepeletier de Saint Fargeau, 1845
- Dolichurus bimaculatus Arnold, 1928
- Dolichurus carbonarius F. Smith, 1869
- Dolichurus cearensis Ducke, 1910
- Dolichurus clypealis Tsuneki in Tsuneki et al., 1992
- Dolichurus corniculus (Spinola, 1808)
- Dolichurus crenatus Ohl, 2002
- Dolichurus dromedarius Nagy, 1971
- Dolichurus formosanus Tsuneki, 1967
- Dolichurus foroforo Ohl, Fritz & Neumann, 2004
- Dolichurus gilberti R. Turner, 1912
- Dolichurus greenei Rohwer, 1916
- Dolichurus guillarmodi Arnold, 1952
- Dolichurus haemorrhous A. Costa, 1886
- Dolichurus ignitus F. Smith, 1869
- Dolichurus kohli Arnold, 1928
- Dolichurus laevis F. Smith, 1873
- Dolichurus lankensis Krombein, 1979
- Dolichurus leioceps Strand, 1913
- Dolichurus maculicollis Tsuneki, 1967
- Dolichurus major Kazenas, 1976
- Dolichurus mindanaonis Tsuneki in Tsuneki et al., 1992
- Dolichurus ombrodes Nagy, 1971
- Dolichurus oxanus Nagy, 1971
- Dolichurus palawanensis Tsuneki in Tsuneki et al., 1992
- Dolichurus pempuchiensis Tsuneki, 1972
- Dolichurus pigmaeus Tsuneki, 1976
- Dolichurus quadridentatus Arnold, 1940
- Dolichurus rubripyx Arnold, 1928
- Dolichurus rugosifrons Tsuneki in Tsuneki et al., 1992
- Dolichurus secundus de Saussure, 1892
- Dolichurus shirozui Tsuneki, 1967
- Dolichurus silvicola Krombein, 1979
- Dolichurus stantoni (Ashmead, 1904)
- Dolichurus taprobanae F. Smith, 1869
- Dolichurus turanicus Gussakovskij, 1952
- Dolichurus venator Arnold, 1928
- Dolichurus yungaburra Ohl, 2002
- † Dolichurus heevansi Ohl, 2004
