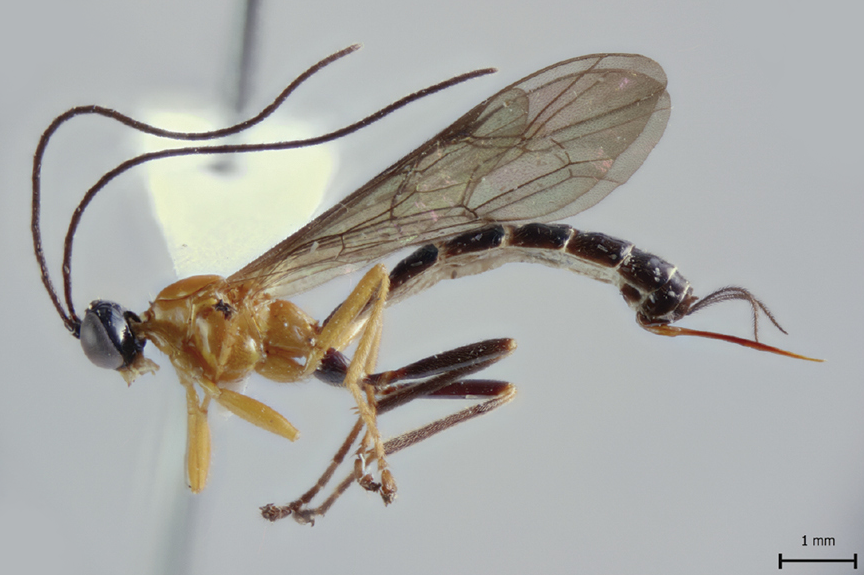
- Female holotype of Hymenoepimecis andina

Scientific classification
- Kingdom: Animalia
- Phylum: Arthropoda
- Class: Insecta
- Order: Hymenoptera
- Family: Ichneumonidae
- Subfamily: Pimplinae
- Tribe: Ephialtini
- Genus: Hymenoepimecis; Viereck, 1912

Type species
- Hymenoepimecis bicolor (Brullé, 1846)

Synonyms
- Epimecis Brullé, 1846

= Hymenoepimecis =

Genus of insects

Hymenoepimecis is a genus of parasitoid wasps belonging to the family Ichneumonidae best known for parasitizing arachnids, specifically those of the families Araneidae and Tetragnathidae.

== Distribution ==
The species of this genus are found in the New World, from Mexico to southern Brazil.

== Species ==
Hymenoepimecis comprises the following twenty-seven species:

- Hymenoepimecis amazonensis Pádua & Oliveira, 2015
- Hymenoepimecis andina Pádua & Sääksjärvi, 2020
- Hymenoepimecis argyraphaga Gauld, 2000
- Hymenoepimecis atriceps (Cresson, 1865)
- Hymenoepimecis bicolor (Brullé, 1846)
- Hymenoepimecis cameroni Townes, 1966
- Hymenoepimecis castilloi Pádua & Sääksjärvi, 2020
- Hymenoepimecis dolichocarinata Pádua & Sääksjärvi, 2020
- Hymenoepimecis duckensis Pádua & Onody, 2015
- Hymenoepimecis ecuatoriana Pádua & Sääksjärvi, 2020
- Hymenoepimecis heidyae Gauld, 1991
- Hymenoepimecis heteropus (Kriechbaumer, 1890)
- Hymenoepimecis japi Sobczak, Loffredo, Penteado-Dias & Gonzaga, 2009
- Hymenoepimecis jordanensis Loffredo & Penteado-Dias, 2009
- Hymenoepimecis kleini Pádua & Sobczak, 2015
- Hymenoepimecis longilobus Pádua & Sääksjärvi, 2020
- Hymenoepimecis manauara Pádua & Oliveira, 2015
- Hymenoepimecis neotropica (Brues & Richardson, 1913)
- Hymenoepimecis pucallpina Pádua & Sääksjärvi, 2020
- Hymenoepimecis rafaelmartinezi Pádua & Sääksjärvi, 2020
- Hymenoepimecis ribeiroi Pádua & Sobczak, 2015
- Hymenoepimecis robertsae Gauld, 1991
- Hymenoepimecis silvanae Loffredo & Penteado-Dias, 2009
- Hymenoepimecis sooretama Sobczak, Loffredo, Penteado-Dias & Gonzaga, 2009
- Hymenoepimecis tedfordi Gauld, 1991
- Hymenoepimecis uberensis Pádua & Onody, 2015
- Hymenoepimecis veranii Loffredo & Penteado-Dias, 2009
