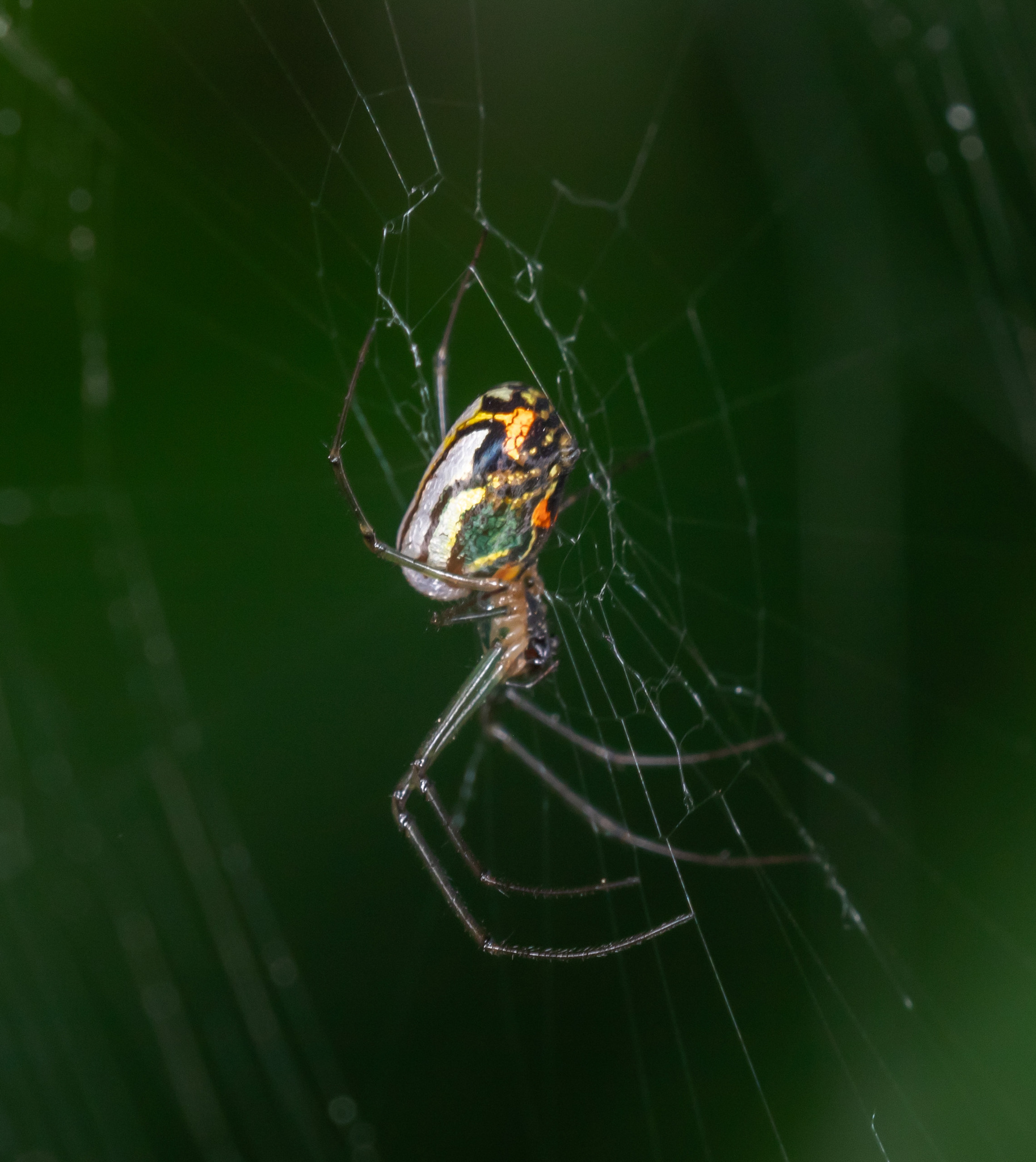
- female from Peru
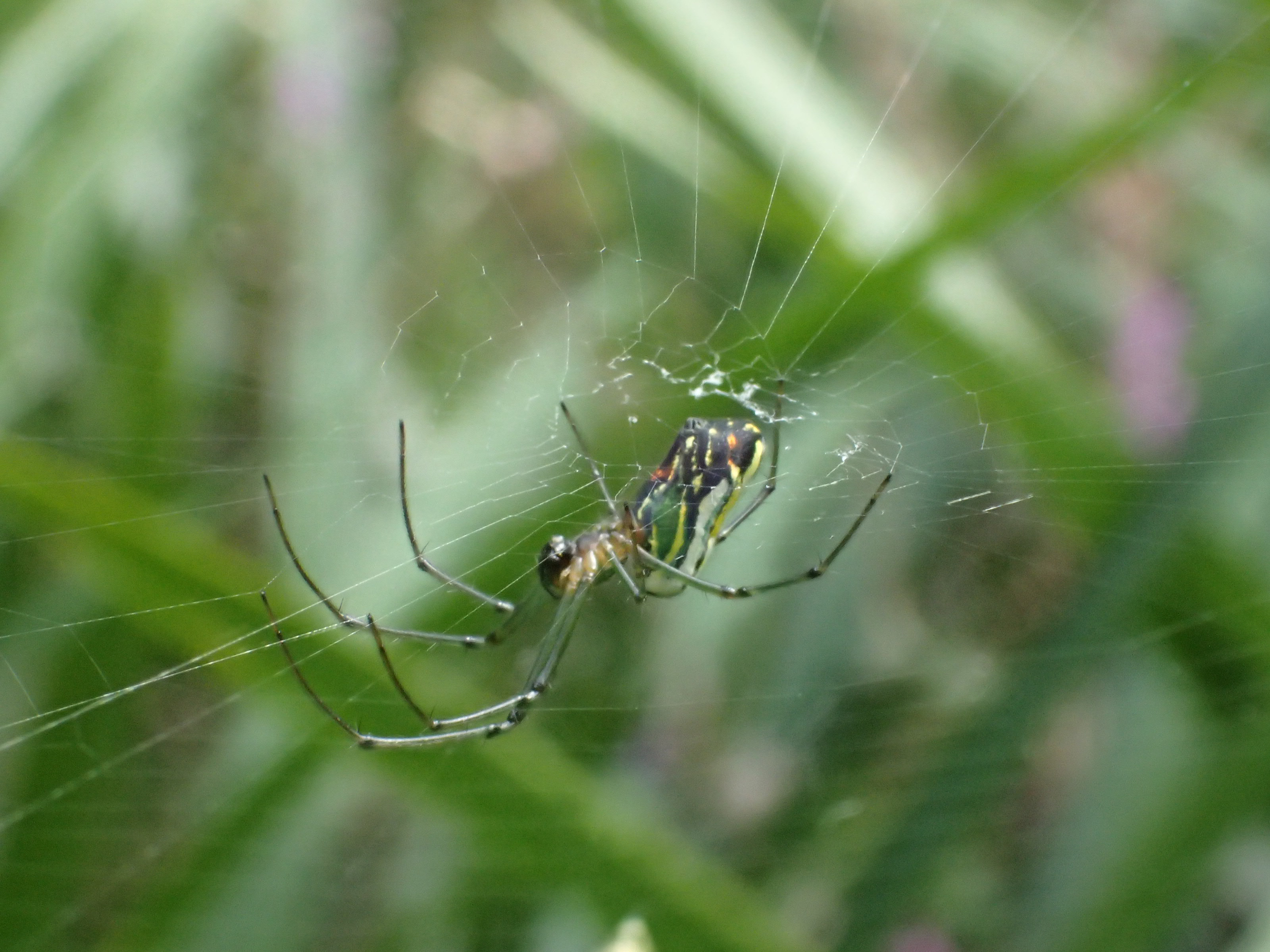
- A lateral view of a mature female Leucauge mariana spider at the hub of her approximately horizontal web

Scientific classification
- Kingdom: Animalia
- Phylum: Arthropoda
- Subphylum: Chelicerata
- Class: Arachnida
- Order: Araneae
- Infraorder: Araneomorphae
- Family: Tetragnathidae
- Genus: Leucauge
- Species: L. mariana

Binomial name
- Leucauge mariana Taczanowski, 1881

= Leucauge mariana =

Species of spider

Leucauge mariana is a long-jawed orb weaver spider, native to Central America and South America. Its web building and sexual behavior have been studied extensively. Males perform several kinds of courtship behavior to induce females to copulate and to use their sperm.

A particularly unusual feature of sex in L. mariana is the formation of mating plugs during copulation. These masses sometimes block the access of subsequent males to the female’s genitalia and can prevent copulations. Unlike other species, L. mariana forms the mating plug from materials contributed by both the female and the male; the male alone cannot make a functional plug. Most mating plugs in other animals are typically viewed as a male tactic used to increase his chances of paternity, without participation of the female. Female participation in creating a mating plugs, and her presumed benefit from them, have led to multiple studies of sexual selection on the sexual behavior of L. mariana.

A second special feature of L. mariana is the possible relation between the undiminished behavioral capabilities of the tiny spiderlings that have only recently emerged from the egg sac; design modifications of the spiderling’s nervous system (greater relative brain size and reduced neuron size) result in it having similar estimated numbers of neurons to those of adults. This may explain the lack of behavioral deficits in web construction by the spiderlings compared with adults.

== Description ==
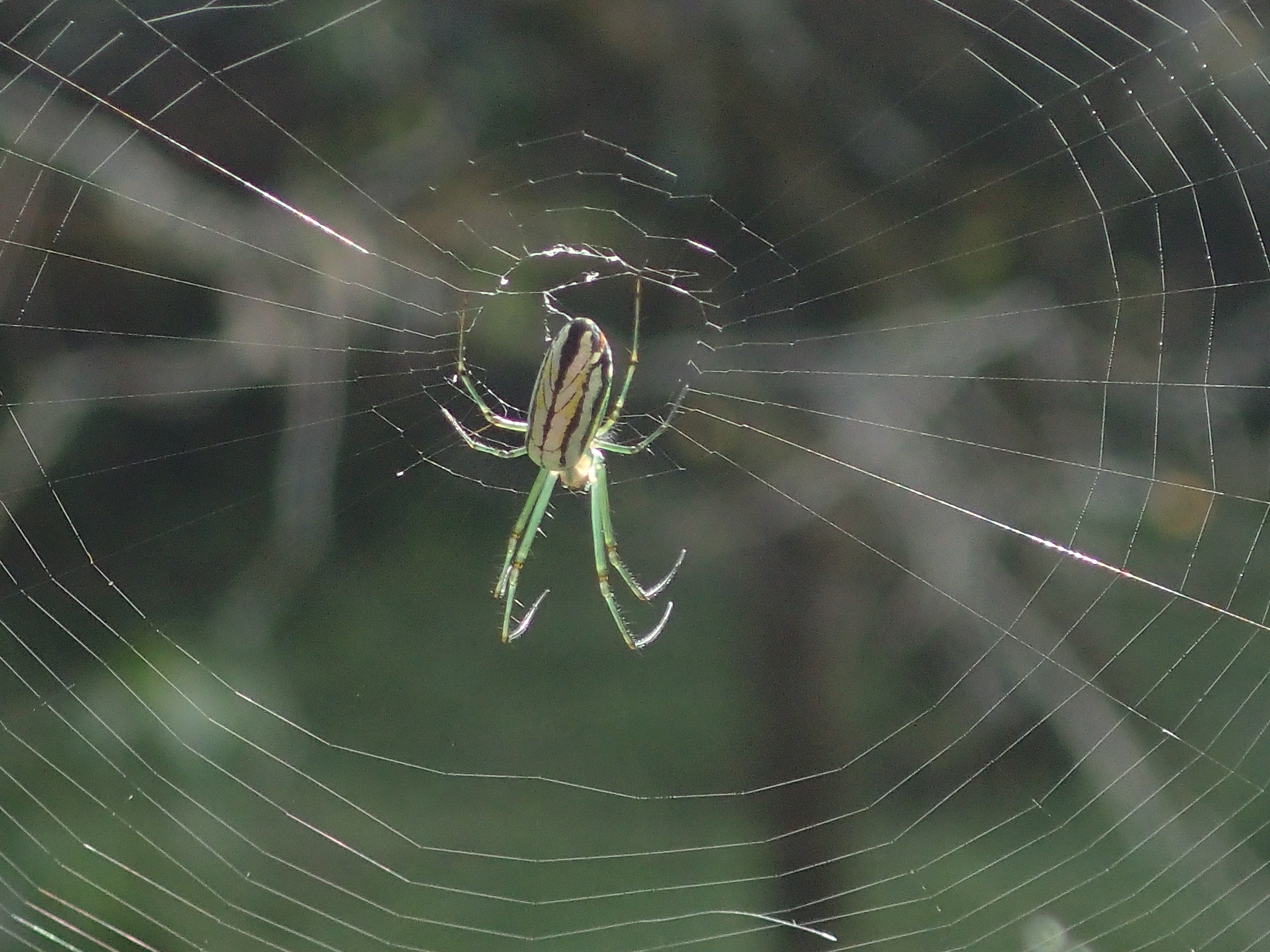
dorsal view of female

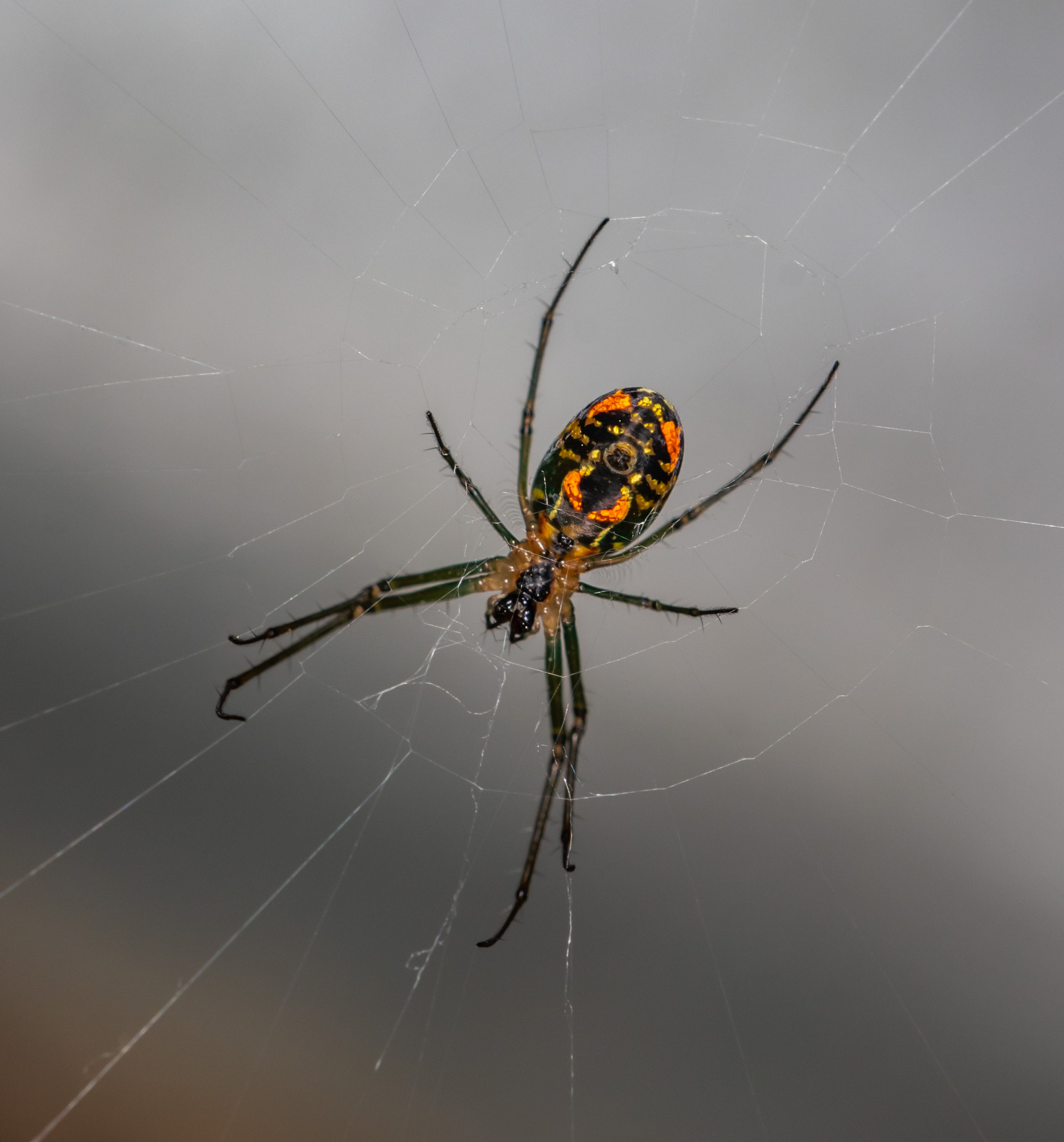
ventral view of female

The sides and ventral surface of the abdomen have complex array of green, yellow, black, white and red markings; the abdomen’s dorsal surface, in contrast, is silvery white with dark streaks. The legs are mostly green. Predators and prey looking at the spider from above while it rests at the hub of its more or less horizontal web would see the complex color patterns on its ventral surface; these colors may help camouflage the spider. On the other hand, predators and prey looking up at the spider from below would see the silvery white pattern, which may also provide camouflage against clouds and the bright sky. The red markings may also serve as a warning to possible predators, as L. mariana emit a weak repugnant odor that can be sensed when a spider is held in the fingers very close to the nose.

An early instar spiderling has a relatively large brain which displaces other organs in its cephalothorax, and also fills an outward bulge in the lower wall of the cephalothorax. This bulge gradually disappears as spiders grow to their adult size. Although the absolute size of the brain of an early instar L. mariana is much smaller than that of an adult, the greater relative size of its brain and the sharp reduction in the diameters of its neurons result in spiderlings and adults having similar numbers of neurons; this similarity may be related to the lack of behavioral deficits in the web construction behavior when spiderlings are compared with adults.

== Taxonomy ==
L. mariana belongs to the family Tetragnathidae, also known as long-jawed orb weavers. The first Leucauge specimens were discovered by Charles Darwin in 1832 near the Guandu River (Rio de Janeiro) and the genus was originally described by Adam White in 1841. The genus is currently being revised, as the type specimen of the genus was lost and Leucauge subsequently became a “dumping ground genus” for species with unclear affinities. Several aspects of the sexual behavior, including sexual cannibalism by the female, frequency of mating plug formation, and correlations between male behavior with plug formation differed in comparisons of specimens of L. mariana from Costa Rica with others from Colombia; it is thus not certain they are the same species. The species was named by Taczanowski in 1881.

== Habitat ==
Leucauge mariana spiders are found from Mexico to Argentina. In the Valle Central in Costa Rica the spiders are very common among weeds in early secondary growth and along wooded streams. Before the arrival of humans, secondary vegetation of this sort grew near rivers, landslides and tree-fall gaps. The population densities in Costa Rica are much greater late in the rainy season and the beginning of the early dry season, but mature individuals are present year-round. Males are often found on either mature females' webs or on the webs of penultimate females.

== Life cycle and reproduction ==
Field-caught males and females can live for a week or longer in captivity without additional food if they are kept in a humid environment. Mature females in the field have been observed to live several weeks. It is believed that females lay multiple clutches of eggs, but this has not been confirmed in nature. In Mexico females laid eggs at sheltered sites (e.g. under leaves) in the leaf litter.

== Mating ==
L. mariana has specific pre-copulatory and post-copulatory rituals. Males cannot force females to mate because the female must seize and hold the male’s chelicerae in hers, and then bend her abdomen toward the male before genital contact can occur. Females are also generally larger than males. Males often wait in the web of a penultimate female spider for her to molt to maturity. Very soon after the female emerges from her old cuticle, the male mates with her. Male-male fights occur on the webs of both mature and penultimate females. After preliminary threats by jerking the web, males spread their front legs as they come together, probably measuring each other’s size. Larger males chase smaller rivals off the web; if the two males are evenly matched in size, they grapple briefly before one of them leaves. Typically the winner cuts the line that the loser leaves behind, thus breaking his contact with the female’s web.

=== Female/male interactions ===
Courting

The male Leucauge mariana uses multiple methods to court the female. These include jerks, rocking, abdomen bobbing, palp rubbing, twanging and tapping lines, and tapping the female. These behaviors are often repeated if the female does not respond to the male by turning to face toward him and adopting a receptive posture that includes facing somewhat downward, repeatedly opening and closing her chelicerae, and finally, bend her abdomen upward. The female sometimes ignores male courtship behavior, and the male eventually leaves if he is not accepted.

==== Copulation ====
Cheliceral clasping occurs just before copulation begins. The females spreads her chelicerae and opens her fangs as the male approaches, then closes her fangs to clasp the basal segment of the male's chelicerae; her chelicerae hook onto ledges on this segment of the male's chelicera; the male’s fangs remain closed. The chelicerae remain clasped throughout copulation and the female can interrupt copulation by breaking off the clasp. During copulation males perform leg tapping, abdomen bobbing and rocking behaviors - the same behaviors seen in pre-copulatory sequences. The male also performs bursts of rhythmic leg pushes with his front legs (I-II) against the front legs of the female. Bursts of male pushing occur when the basal hematodocha of the palp is inflated. Genital coupling occurs when the male extends one of his pedipalps to make contact with the female's abdomen and attempts to insert it into her epigynum. The male's palpal insertions were of two types: long insertions lasting for about a minute, and short insertions on the order of a second. Long insertions occur more often during early stages of copulation, but orders vary. Short insertions occur in bursts, with each insertion lasting a second or two. Short insertions occur more often toward the end of copulation, but order varies. After a burst of short insertions the male withdraws his palp and then extends his other palp to contact the female’s genitalia. Long insertions occur more when a male copulates with a virgin female; multiple insertions were rare in matings with non-virgin females. In some attempted insertions the male’s palp do not engage properly with the epigynum (“flubs”). During insertions inflatable sacs in the pedipalp (the hematodochae) inflate and deflate, probably locking the palp to the female’s epigynum and moving the tip of the male’s embolus (the sperm transfer organ) deeper into the female. There are multiple inflation and deflation cycles during each long insertion, while there is only a single inflation and deflation during each short insertion. Insemination occurs early during copulation when the sperm is transferred by the embolus into chamber I of the female’s spermatheca. Sperm is then decapsulated and gradually moves deeper into the female, into chamber II and III.

==== Mate plugging ====
Deposition of a mating plug depends on both the male and the female in L. mariana. The substances required for mating plugs come from both males and females. Males deposit a sticky, toothpaste-like white substance on the female epigynum during short insertions, but it often sticks to the male’s palp and is removed during insertions. For a mating plug form the female must add a liquid that combines with the male’s material to create a smooth-surfaced mass that, when it hardens, adheres tightly to the epigynum and blocks the entrance to the insemination duct. Formation of mating plugs is presumably a result of sexual selection. Mating plugs are sometimes removed by a subsequent male with his conductor hook, but some males failed in attempts to remove them. Hypotheses to explain plug formation include protecting the male’s sperm from dilution by the sperm of subsequent mates (an advantage for the male), and allowing the female to control which male that mates with her will sire her offspring.

=== Post-copulation ===
Sexual cannibalism was observed in Colombian L. mariana much more frequently than in Costa Rican L. mariana. Decreased rates of hematodocal inflations (and decreased sperm count) positively correlated with increased possibility of the female attempting to cannibalize the male. Female cannibalism only occurred when the male was attempting to mate. Female choice of sexually successful males was associated with involved strength of cheliceral clasping, duration of palpal insertion, and sperm count (measured through hematodocal inflation rates).

=== Re-mating ===
Female L. mariana spiders often mate with more than one male, and the traits of the female’s first mate affect the likelihood that she accepts or rejects courtship from subsequent males. If during the first copulation the male made fewer short insertion and a higher number of flubs, the female was more likely to accept mating with a second mate. Because a majority of sperm transfer occurs during long insertions, reduced number of short insertions may not affect sperm count.

== Social behavior ==
Leucauge mariana spiders are generally solitary spiders for most of the year. During the dry season, however, adults sometimes form aggregations in which their orb webs are built on shared tangles of support silk strands.

=== Adult sociality ===
Adult males, are unable to build orbs themselves, but sometime evict nearly mature individuals (presumably both males and females) from their webs and use them for prey capture.

== Web ==
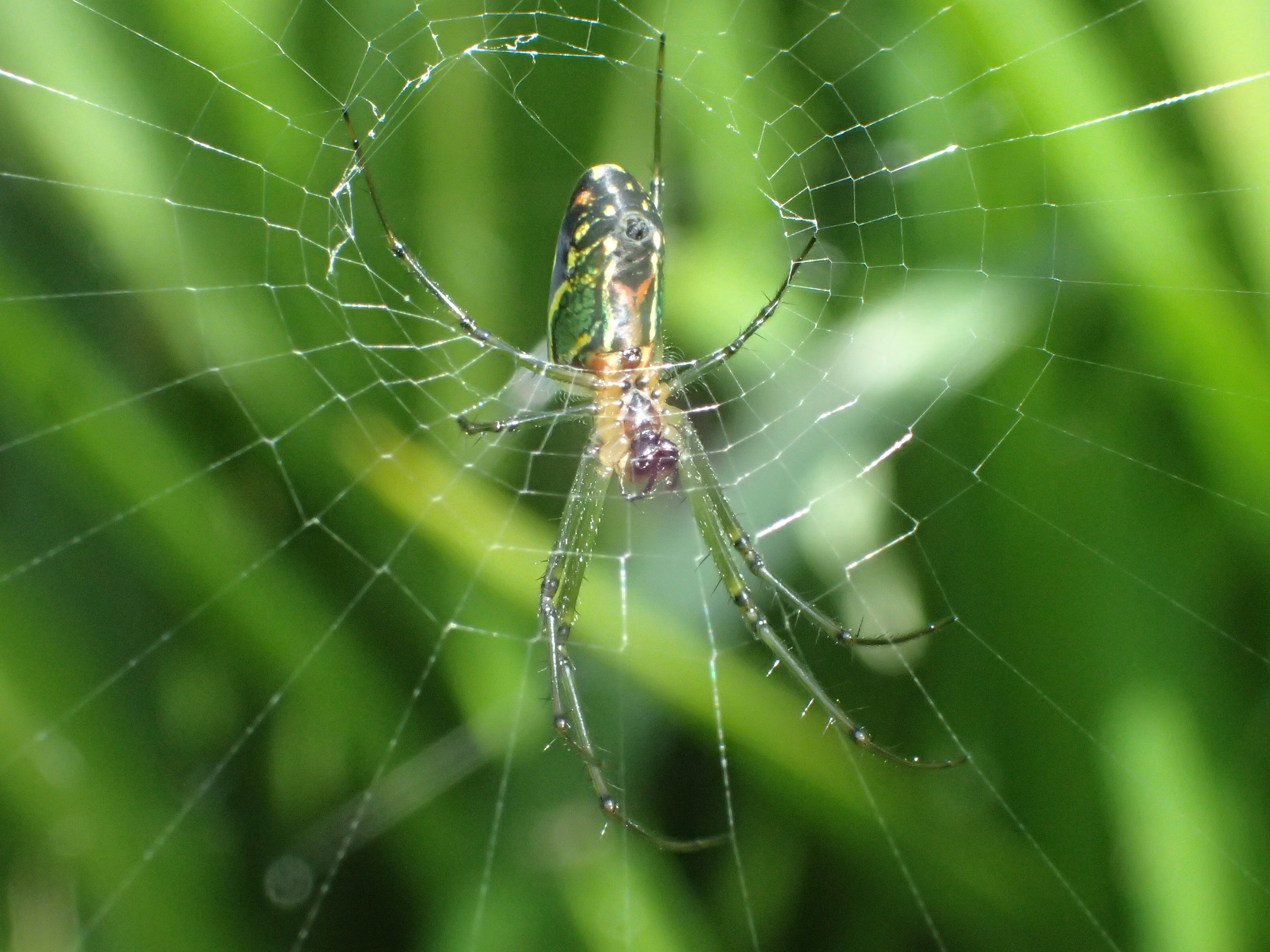
A ventral view of a mature female L. mariana in her web

=== Web type ===
Compared to some other orb-weavers, the horizontal webs of L. mariana are more open meshed, weaker and have small amounts of sticky material on the sticky spiral lines.

=== Construction behavior and cues ===
Leucauge mariana build their orb webs of both non-sticky silk and wet sticky silk. Often a spider builds several orbs each day; the first 1 to 2 hours before dawn, another around noon, and still another early in the evening. Their orbs are relatively flimsy and are often attached to objects that move in the wind (e.g., plant leaves), and often accumulate damage relatively rapidly.

Spiders find websites by exploring their surroundings, and often make long, airborne lines to travel from previous websites. As in other orb-weavers, a preliminary period of exploration of a site eventually ends when the spider establishes a site where three or more lines intersect; this will be the point of reference for the hub. Frame, anchor line and radii construction are the next steps in web construction. A radius is constructed as part of the construction of each frame, but other details of frame construction vary. L. mariana often reuse the frame lines of previous webs when building a new orb at the same site. Typically several more radii are built after the last frame is in place, and then hub loop construction begins after the last radius (or occasionally after the penultimate radius) is in place. Hub construction begins when the spider grasps a line in the center of the hub with one leg III and begins to rotate slowly, fastening adjacent radii to each other, one after another. This leg III is not moved during hub construction, and is apparently used to measure the distance at which each hub spiral attachment should be made. Hub construction ends abruptly, and the spider moves farther away from the hub and begins to build the “temporary spiral”; this line continues going outward toward the edge of the web. The temporary spiral ends short of the web’s edge, and after a pause of a few seconds, the spider begins laying a second sticky, spiral working inward. She removes the previous, temporary spiral (hence its name) as she moves inward. As is typical of orb webs, the only sticky silk in the orb is the sticky spiral.

==== Experiments regarding construction ====
Experiments and measurements of webs have demonstrated several surprising mental abilities in L. mariana. When she begins an orb, a spider can adjust several aspects of the design of an orb (including the total area, the number of radii, and the spaces between sticky and non-sticky spiral lines) to the amount of sticky silk that she has available in her silk glands. She also adjusts the spaces between spiral lines while she is building on the basis of the location of previous loops of sticky line, memories of distances between lines that she encountered a few seconds previously, the distance from the hub, and the direction of gravity. Less complete data suggest that the spider may also remember the locations of alterations she encountered previously while she is circling the web laying the sticky spiral, even after having circled 360^{o}. She can distinguish this alteration from a second alteration that she encounters after having circled only 270^{o}. Again, these feats are accomplished even though the spider cannot see the lines in her web and must rely on touch to sense them. Learning has little or no role in orb construction, as tiny spiderlings that are newly emerged from the egg sac build orbs with equally precise spacing between lines and make equally elaborate adjustments to the environment such as limited spaces in which to build their orbs.

=== Prey capture techniques ===
Perhaps due to the weakness of their webs, female L. mariana spiders are spectacularly fast hunters. The female on her web can make quick and accurate turns towards vibrations caused by prey colliding with the web. Spiders waiting at the hub responded (with no preliminary warning) to the impact of a prey on her web by turning up to greater than 90^{o}, locating new lines to grasp for all eight legs, determining the location of the prey, and ran 4-5 body lengths to attack, all in as little as 0.21s. The turns at the hub were precise: the spider turned to hold the radius closest to the prey with one front leg in 90% of these rapid turns. Vibrations produced by the prey’s impact sensed by the legs were probably used to achieve this precise orientation. The rear legs (III and IV) supported most of the spider’s weight and supplied the motive force during the turn; the spider used legs I and II to quickly find and grasp the radii. These feats are especially impressive since the spiders are unable to see the lines in their webs; the way they orient, using their long front legs to find lines, can be likened to a blind person with a cane would move while walking on a sparse network of aerial lines.
