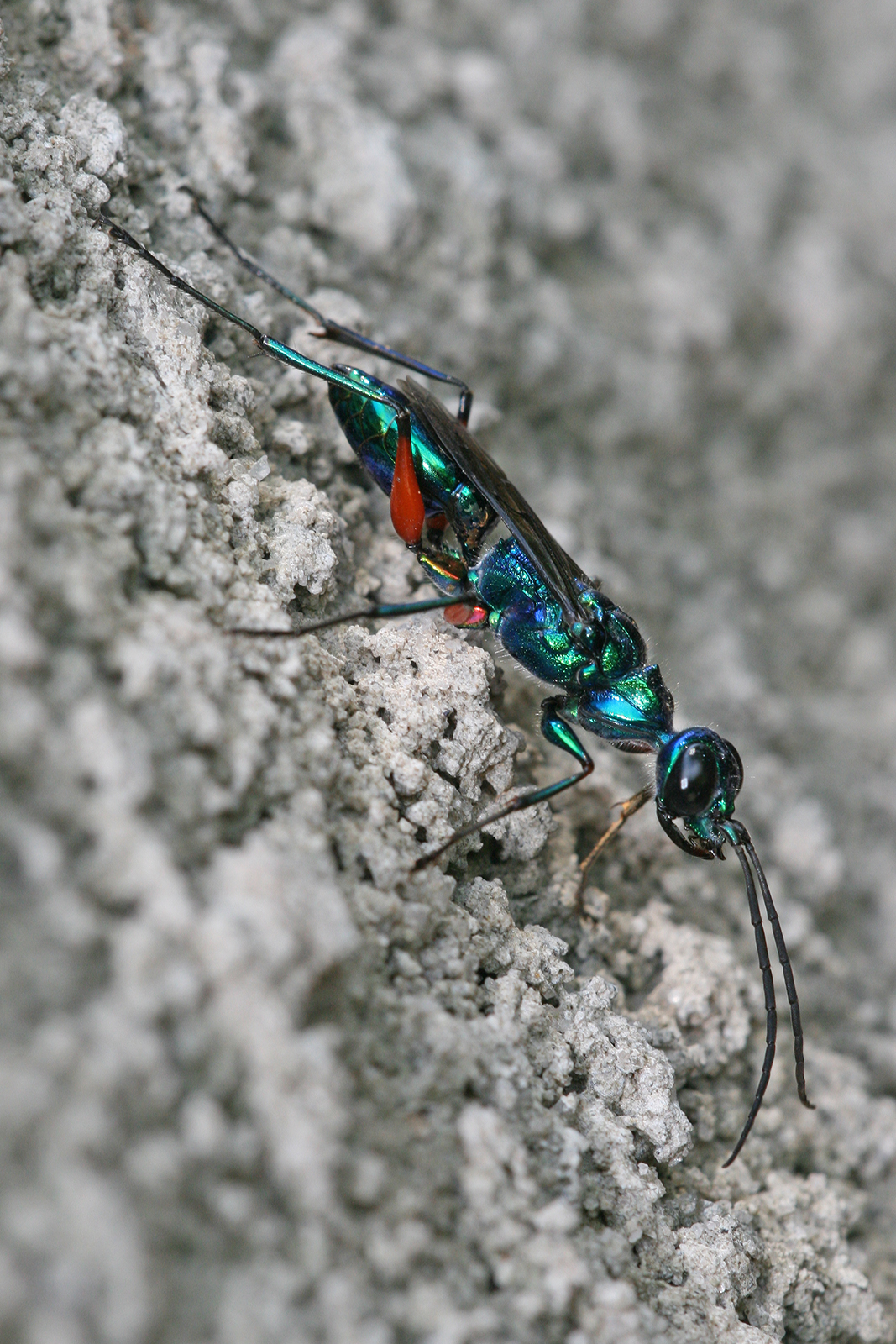
- Ampulex compressa

Scientific classification
- Domain: Eukaryota
- Kingdom: Animalia
- Phylum: Arthropoda
- Class: Insecta
- Order: Hymenoptera
- Superfamily: Apoidea
- Family: Ampulicidae; Shuckard, 1840

= Ampulicidae =

Cockroach wasps Temporal range: Early Cretaceous–Present

Family of wasps

Ampulicidae, or cockroach wasps, are a small (about 170 species), primarily tropical family of sphecoid wasps, all of which use various cockroaches as prey for their larvae. They are the most primitive family of sphecoid hunting wasps. They tend to have elongated jaws, pronounced neck-like constrictions behind the head, strongly petiolate abdomens, and deep grooves on the thorax. Many are quite ant-like in appearance, though some are brilliant metallic blue, green, and hot pink.

Most species sting the roach more than once and in a specific way. The first sting is directed at nerve ganglia in the cockroach's thorax, temporarily paralyzing the victim for a few minutes – more than enough time for the wasp to deliver a second sting. The second sting is directed into a region of the cockroach's brain that controls the escape reflex, among other things. When the cockroach has recovered from the first sting, it makes no attempt to flee. The wasp clips the antenna with its mandibles and drinks some of the haemolymph before walking backwards and dragging the roach by its clipped antenna to steer it to a burrow, where an egg will be laid on it. The wasp larva feeds on the subdued, living cockroach.

== Description ==
Their antennae are inserted low on their face, with the sockets close to, or touching the fronto-clypeal structure. Its long prothorax is usually tuberculate with a high collar. The propodeum is also long, and ranges from U-shaped to nearly triangular. The mid-tibiae have two apical spurs, and its claws have an inner tooth. The marginal cell of the forewing apically acuminate, and apendiculate. The forewing also has two to three submarginal cells and two recurrent veins. The abdomen is sessile or has a petiole made up of the sternum and tergum.

== Classification ==
Classification of Ampulicidae follows the Catalog of Sphecidae by Wojciech J. Pulawski, California Academy of Sciences:

Ampulicinae

- Ampulicini
  - Ampulex – 132 species, found worldwide
  - Trirogma – 7 species from Asia

Dolichurinae

- Aphelotomini
  - Aphelotoma – 8 species from Australia
  - Riekefella – 1 species from Australia
- Dolichurini
  - Dolichurus – 50 species, found worldwide
  - Paradolichurus – 4 species from the New World
