= Chintamoni Kar Bird Sanctuary =

Nature reserve in West Bengal, India

- IUCN category IV (habitat/species management area)
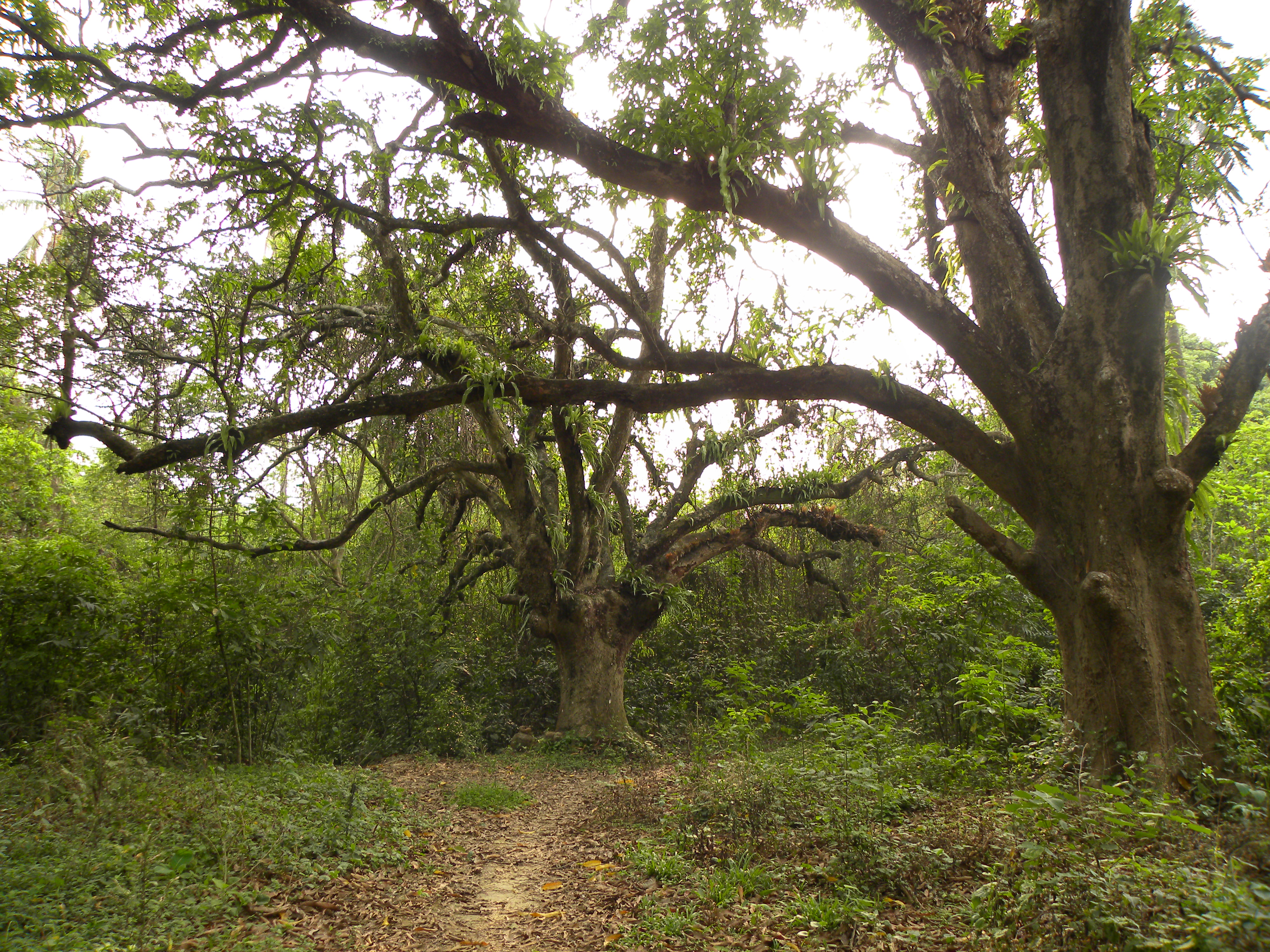

- Location within West Bengal Location within India
- Interactive map of Chintamoni Kar Bird Sanctuary
- Location: Narendrapur, West Bengal, India
- Nearest city: Kolkata (20 km)
- Coordinates: 22.4295°N 88.4007°E
- Established: 1982

Chintamoni Kar Bird Sanctuary (CKBS), formerly known as Kayaler Bagan, is a bird sanctuary located in West Bengal, India, south of Kolkata. This garden is famous for its wide variety of birds, butterflies, ferns and orchids.

== History ==
It was given sanctuary status in 1982. Before then, it was originally a large mango garden with huge mango trees. The government of West Bengal took the initiative to make it open to the public and acquired it from private owners in October 2005. On 8 September 2004 it was named Narendrapur Wildlife Sanctuary, and on 21 October 2005 it was renamed Chintamoni Kar Bird Sanctuary, in honour of celebrated sculptor Chintamoni Kar, who had for many years strived relentlessly to give "Kayaler Bagan" the status of a sanctuary.

== Transport ==
The nearest populated place, Narendrapur, is 15 km from Sealdah on the Sealdah – Sonarpur line and is part of the Kolkata Suburban Railway system. It is connected by road to Garia and the EM Bypass. It is 20 km from Howrah railway station.

== List of common birds ==
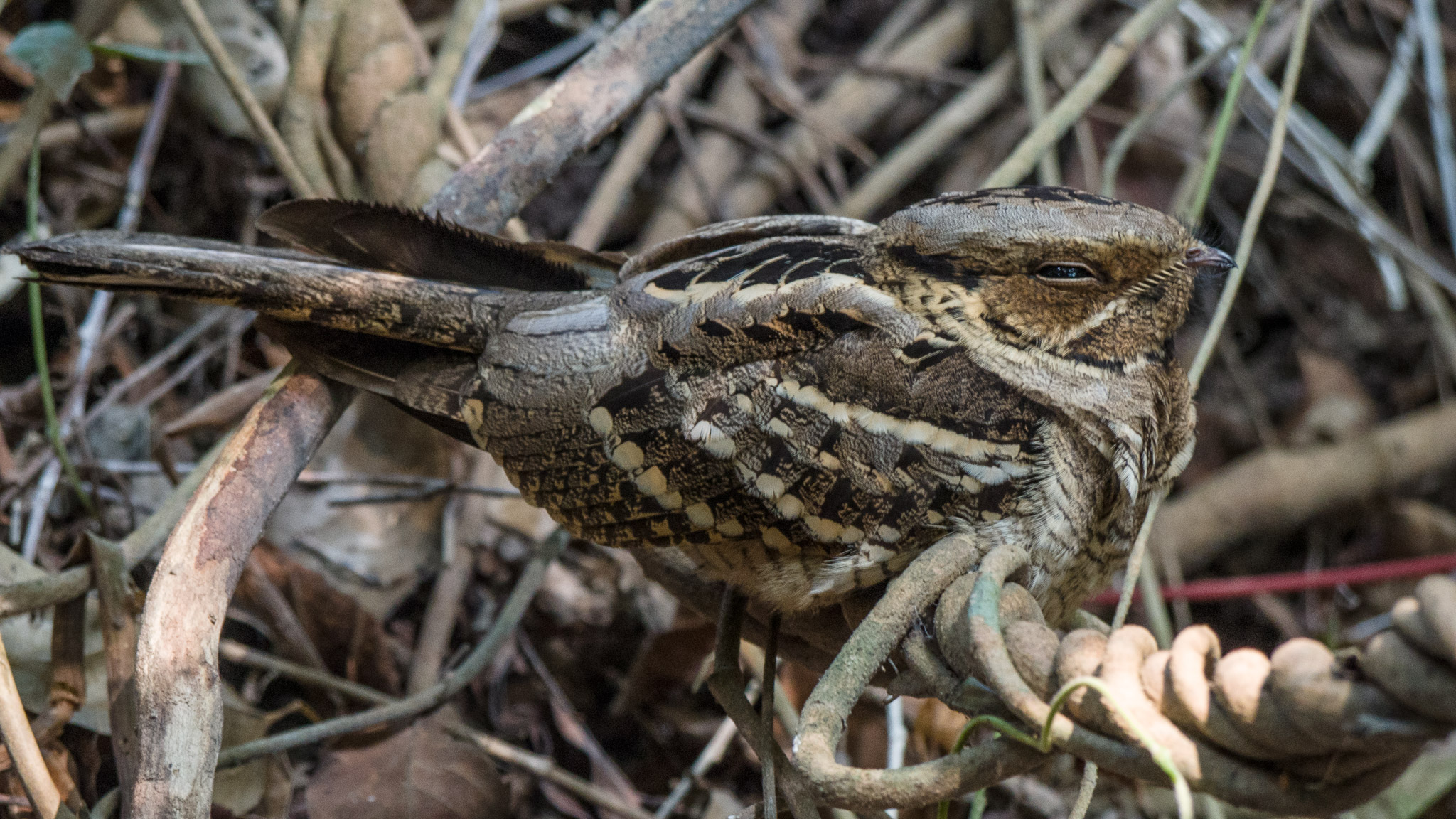
A well-camouflaged large-tailed nightjar in the sanctuary

The names in brackets "()" are the scientific names.

- Ashy drongo (Dicrurus leucophaeus)
- Asian koel (Eudynamys scolopaceo)
- Brown fish owl (Ketupa zeylonensis)
- Black drongo (Dicrurus macrocercus)
- Shikra (Accipiter badius)
- Indian pond heron (Ardeola grayii)
- Bronzed drongo (Dicruridae)
- Cattle egret (Bubulcus ibis)
- Scaly-breasted munia (Lonchura punchtulata)
- Little egret (Egretta garzetta)
- Little cormorant (Phalacocorax niger)
- White wagtail (Motacilla alba personanta)
- Asian green bee-eater (Merops orientalis)
- House crow (Corvus splendens)
- Large-billed crow (Corvus macrorhynchos)
- Rufous treepie (Dendrocitta vagabunda)
- White-throated kingfisher (Halcyon smyrnensis)
- Stork-billed kingfisher (Halcyon capensis)
- Fulvous-breasted woodpecker (Dendrocopos macei)
- Rufous woodpecker (Celeus brachyurus)
- Streak-throated woodpecker (Picus xanthopygaeus)
- Common emerald dove (Chalcophaps indica)
- Spotted dove (Spilopelia chinensis)
- Indian paradise flycatcher (terpsiphone paradisi)
- Oriental magpie-robin (Copsychus saularis)
- Olive-backed sunbird(Cinnyris jugularis)
- Black-hooded oriole (Oriolus xanthornus)
- Cinereous tit (Parus cinereus)
- Chestnut-tailed starling (Sturnia malabarica)
- Red-vented bulbul (Pycnonotus cafer)
- Oriental white eye (Zosterops palpebrosus)
- White-throated fantail (Rhipidura albicollis)
- Orange-headed Thrush (Geokichla citrina)
- little spiderhunter (Arachnothera longirostra)

== List of common spiders ==
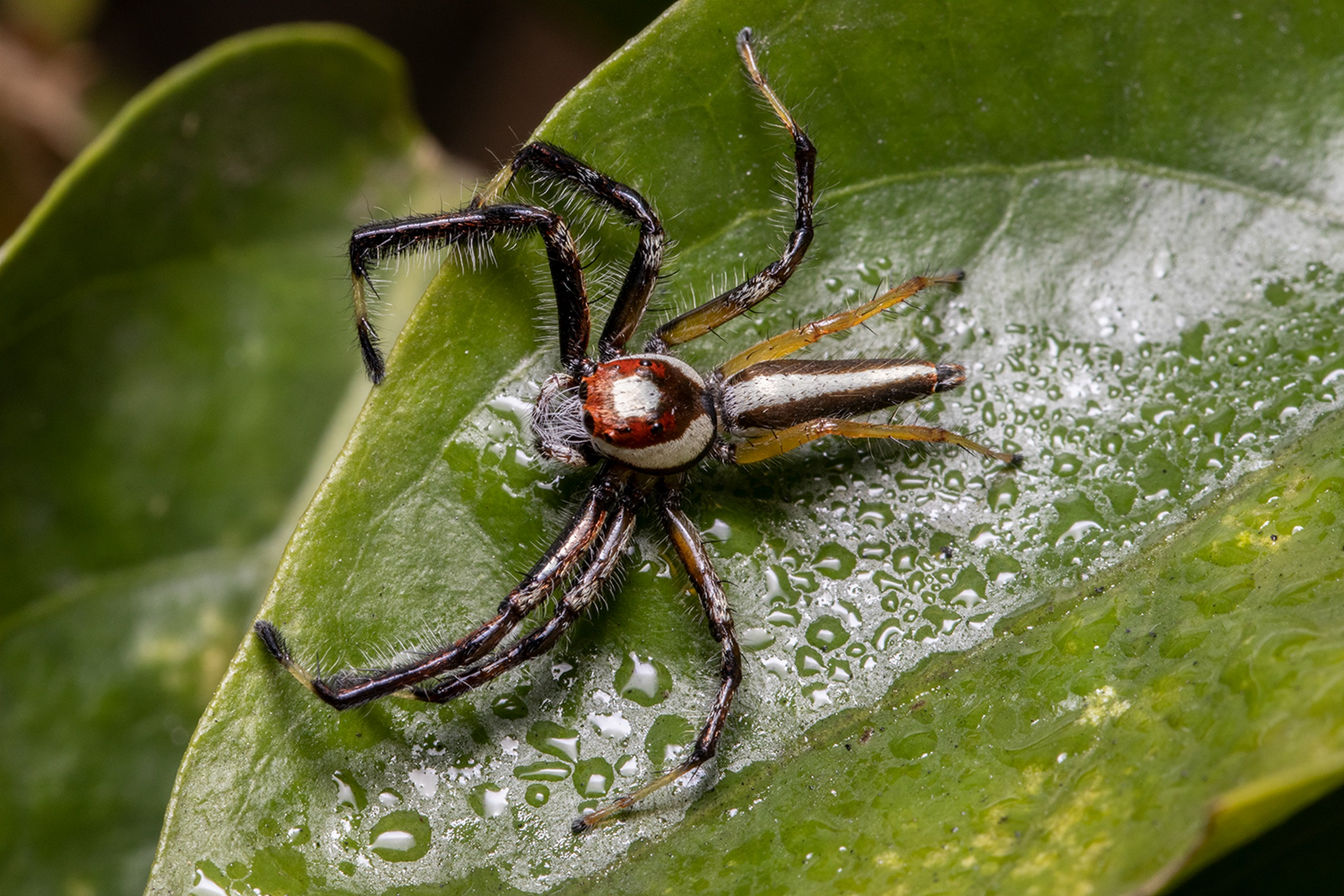
A jumping spider, Telamonia dimidiata, resting on a leaf in the sanctuary

The names in brackets "()" are the scientific names.

- Garden spider or signature spider (Argiope pulchella)
- Imitation spider (Cyclosa sp.)
- Grass jewel spider (Cyrtarachne keralayensis)
- Lagalaisei's garden spider (Eriovixia sp.)
- Kidney garden spider (Araneus mitificus)
- Tent web spider or dome weavers (Cyrtophora sp.)
- Dark wolf spider (Pardosa sp.)
- Wolf spider (Lycosa sp.)
- Yellow sac spider (Cheiracanthium sp.)
- Banded phintella jumping spider (Phintella vittata)
- Joly spider (Epocilla aurantiaca)
- Heavy bodied jumper (Hyllus semicupreus)
- Ant mimic spider (Myrmarachne sp.)
- Fighting spider (Thiania sp.)
- Pantropical jumping spider (Plexippus paykulli)
- Green crab spider (Olios milleti)
- Silver orb spider (Leucauge granulata)
- Orchard spider or decorative silver orb spider (Leucauge decorate)
- Common house spider (Achaearanea sp.)
- Crab spider or brown flower spider (Camaricus sp.)

== List of common butterflies ==
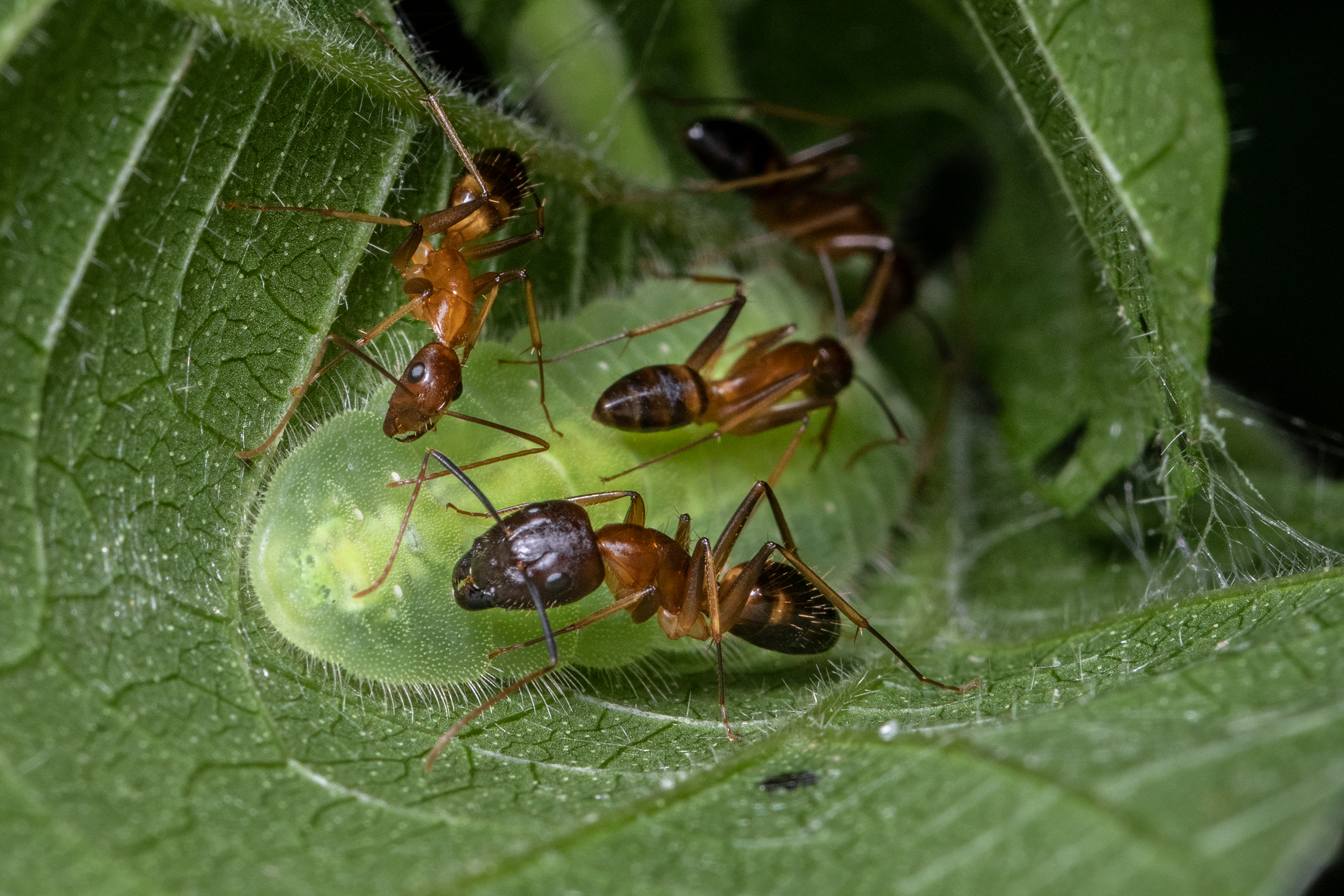
Ants attending a caterpillar of the falcate oakblue to acquire a sweet secretion from its dorsal gland

The names in brackets "()" are the scientific names.

- Common Jezebel হরতনি (Delias eucharis)
- Redbase Jezebel লোপামুদ্রা (Delias pasithoe)
- Tawny coster হরিনছড়া (Acraea terpsicore)
- Common leopard চিতা (Phalanta phalantha)
- Grey pansy চাঁদনরি (Junonia atlites)
- Common jester পিপুল্কাটি (Symbrenthia lilaea)
- Peacock pansy নয়ান (Junonia almana)
- Striped tiger বাঘবল্লা (Danaus genutia)
- Blue tiger (Tirumala limniace)
- Chestnut tiger ছিট্মউল (Parantica sita)
- Common emigrant পায়রাচালি (Catopsilia pomona)
- Common pierrot তিলাইয়া (Castalius rosimon)
- Red pierrot সাজুন্তি (Talicada nyseus)

== See also ==
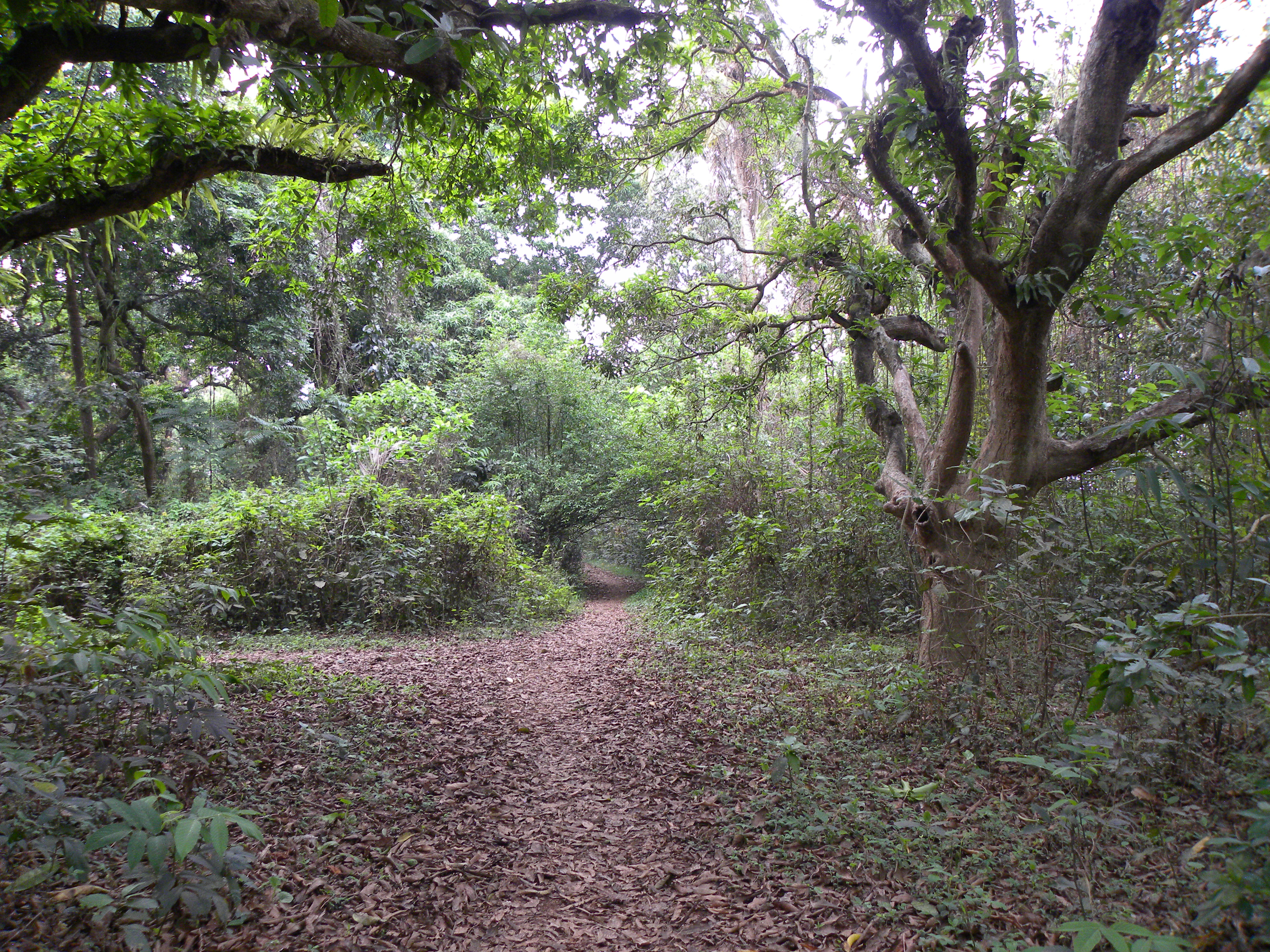
A footpath in the sanctuary

- Kanwar Taal Bird Sanctuary
- Sultanpur Bird Sanctuary
- Bharatpur Bird Sanctuary
