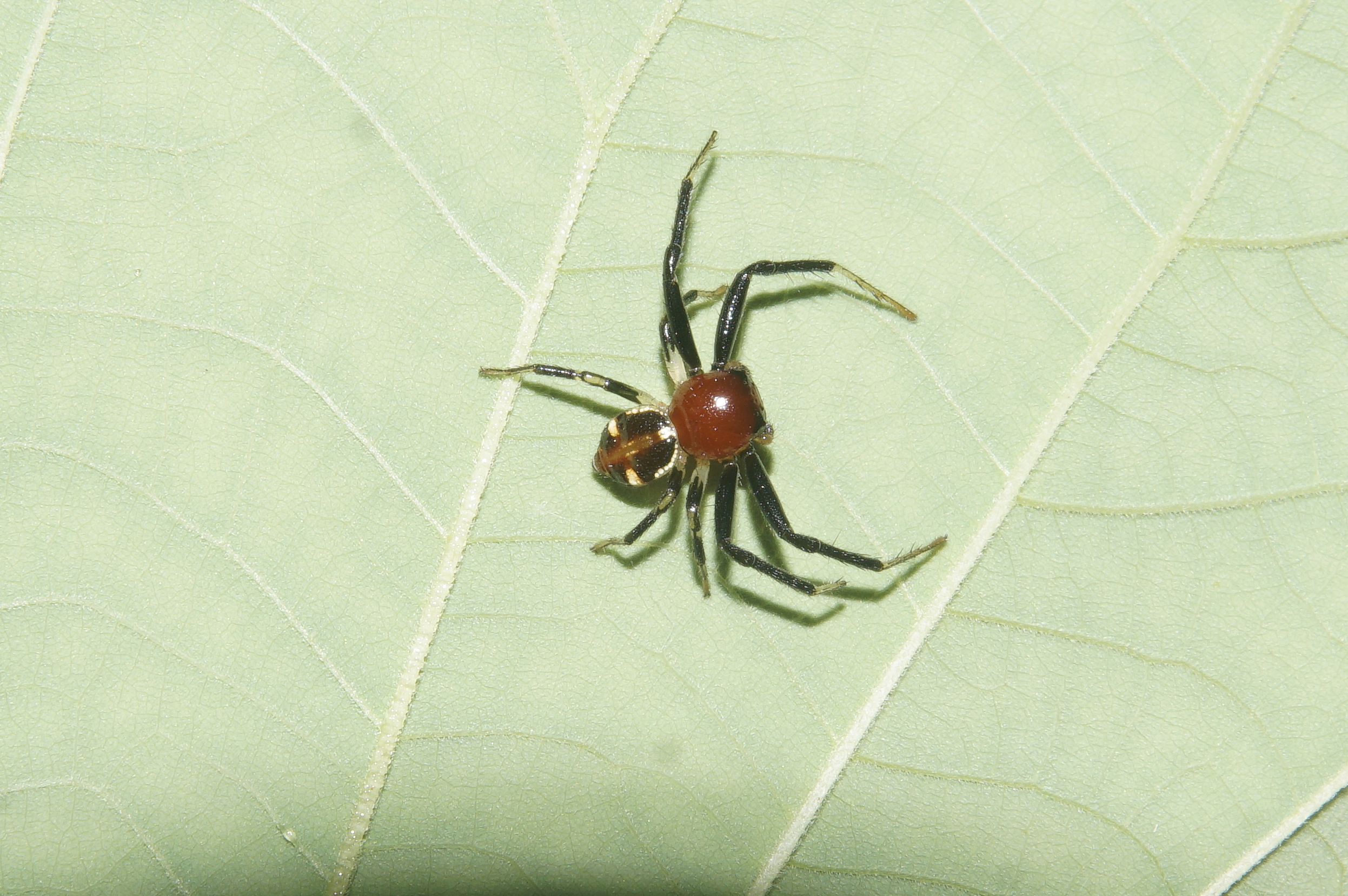
- female
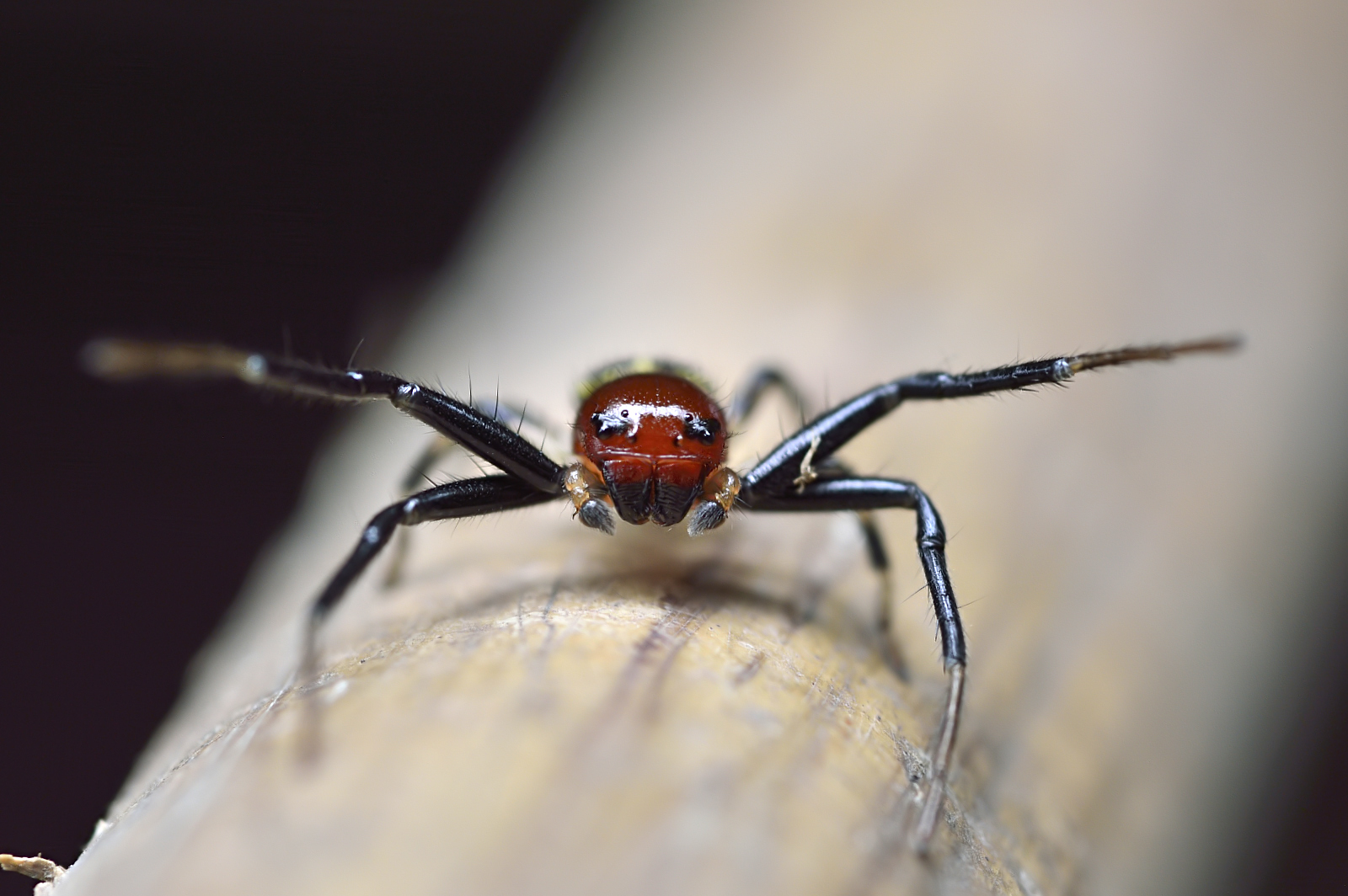
- male from India

Scientific classification
- Kingdom: Animalia
- Phylum: Arthropoda
- Subphylum: Chelicerata
- Class: Arachnida
- Order: Araneae
- Infraorder: Araneomorphae
- Family: Thomisidae
- Genus: Camaricus
- Species: C. formosus

Binomial name
- Camaricus formosus Thorell, 1887

Synonyms
- Camaricus fornicatus Thorell, 1890

= Camaricus formosus =

Brown Flower Spider

Species of spider

Camaricus formosus is a species of crab spider in the family Thomisidae. It was first described by Tamerlan Thorell in 1887 and is the type species of the genus Camaricus.

The species is widely distributed across South and Southeast Asia.

== Etymology ==
The specific epithet formosus is Latin meaning "beautiful" or "handsome", likely referring to the spider's distinctive coloration and markings. It is not related to "Formosa", a historic name for Taiwan, where the species has not been found.

== Distribution ==
C. formosus has an extensive distribution range from India to Indonesia (Sumatra), China, and the Philippines. The species has been documented from the Andaman and Nicobar Islands, West Bengal, Burma, and Sumatra.

Recent records include specimens from Bangladesh, where it was recorded as a new country record in 2017.

== Habitat ==
The species is known to inhabit rice fields and has been documented as part of the riceland spider fauna of South and Southeast Asia.

== Description ==
C. formosus exhibits the typical sexual dimorphism found in many crab spiders. Females are larger than males, measuring 7-9 mm in total length, while males are 4-6 mm.

The cephalothorax is red in coloration and covered with black hairs, featuring brown and black patches. The anterior portion and lateral sides of the cephalothorax are decorated with conspicuous deep brown or black patches, though in male specimens the central brown patch may be absent. The species has eight eyes arranged in two rows, with the posterior row slightly longer than the anterior row.

The abdomen is dark brown and longer than wide, covered with black hairs and decorated with distinctive chalk-white bands running both longitudinally and laterally. The epigyne and other reproductive structures have been well documented in the taxonomic literature.

The legs are robust, light greenish in color, and covered with hairs and spines. The legs are ornamented with black patches, though in males the first and second pairs may be completely dark brown.

== Taxonomy ==
The species was initially confused with Camaricus maugei and was considered a junior synonym by Eugène Simon in 1895. However, Benoy Krishna Tikader removed it from synonymy in 1977, establishing it as a valid species distinct from C. maugei.
