= Indian Dental Association =

Organization

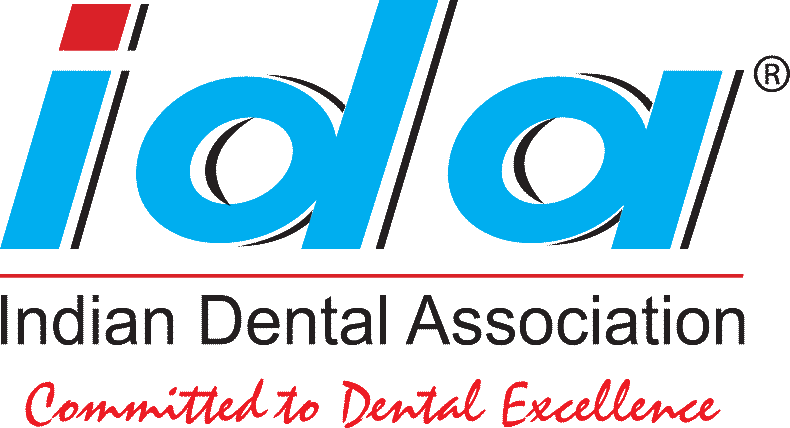
- Abbreviation: IDA
- Formation: 1949
- Type: Professional Association
- Headquarters: Mumbai, India
- Location: India
- Region served: Global
- Members: 75,000+
- President: Dr. Subra Nandy
- Hon. Secretary General: Dr. Ashok Dhoble
- Immediate Past President: Dr. M Raveendranath
- Key people: Dr. Rafiuddin Ahmed (Founder)
- Affiliations: FDI World Dental Federation
- Website: www.ida.org.in

Indian Dental Association (IDA) represents dental professionals in India. Established in 1949, The association currently has more than 75,000 members, 450 local branches, 28 state branches and 8 Union Territory branches and 1 Defence branch across India. The professional association is committed to public oral health, ethics, science and advancement of dental professionals through its initiatives in advocacy, education, research and development of standards.

== Overview ==
Indian Dental Association was founded in 1946 by Dr. Rafiuddin Ahmed, also known as the 'Father of Dentistry' in India. He serves two terms as the President of the association while actively handling prime duties and responsibilities. Initially, the association was called "All India Dental Association" but was later renamed as "Indian Dental Association", as it is known today.

The State Branch has its jurisdiction within the state territory and covers all members of the State or Union Territory. Every state branch acts as the coordinating link between the Head Office and local branches. It oversees the functions and activities of its local branches.

IDA members include dental professionals, dental students, and affiliates.The organisation focuses on public oral health through various IDA Health Initiatives and National Oral Health Programme.

The Association's official publication is the Journal of the Indian Dental Association, along with other publications like Clinical Dentistry, IDA Times, Oral Health, Product Profile, Dental Events, and Student Digest.

Indian Dental Association also focuses on educational programs to advocate, promote, and encourage continuing dental education by enhancing the knowledge and skills of dental professionals.

== Advocacy ==
The association is the voice of dental professionals that advocates 'optimal health for all' before the government and for policymakers. The association represents Indian dentistry, defending sound science and fair dealings on behalf of patients and the profession.
