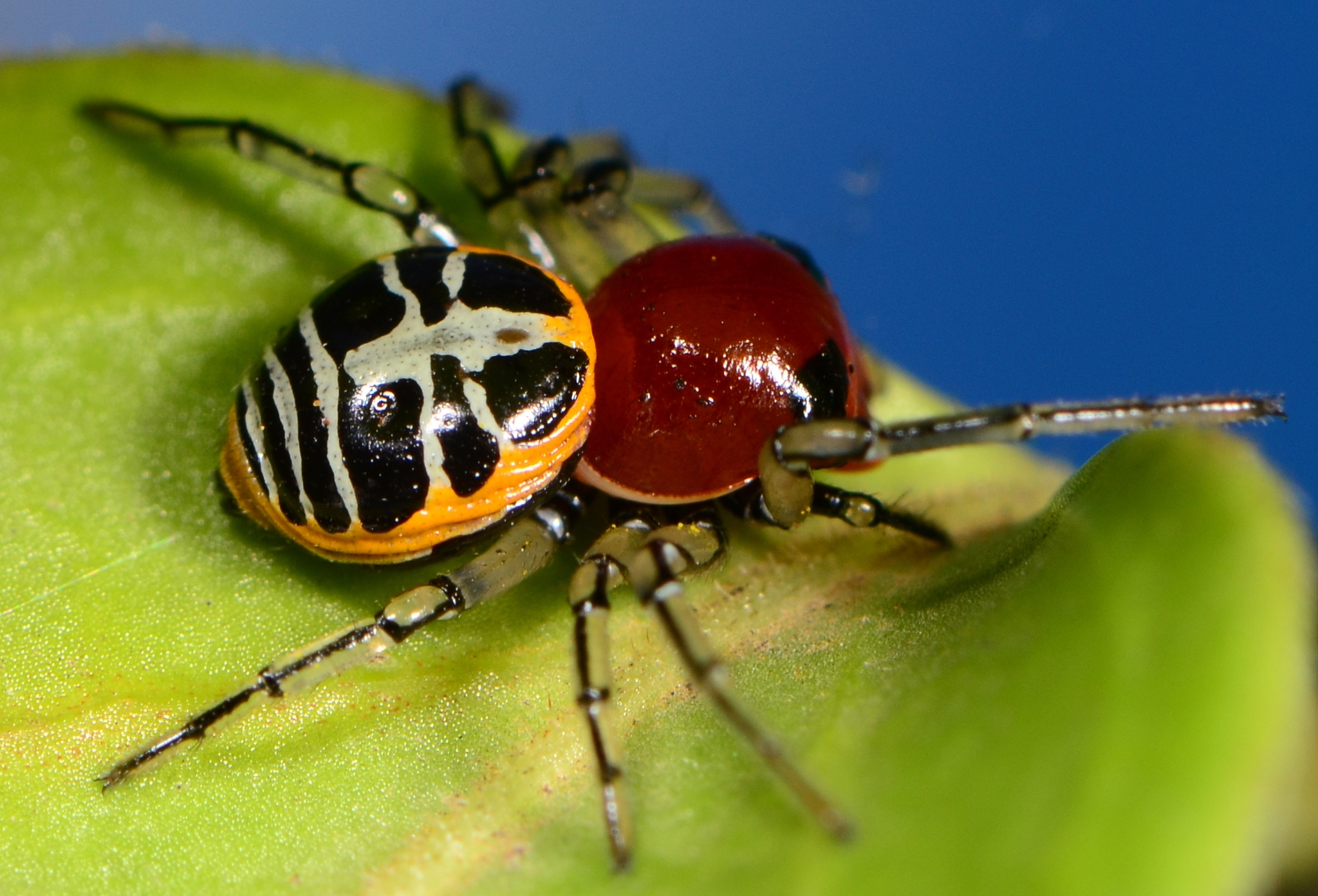
- female
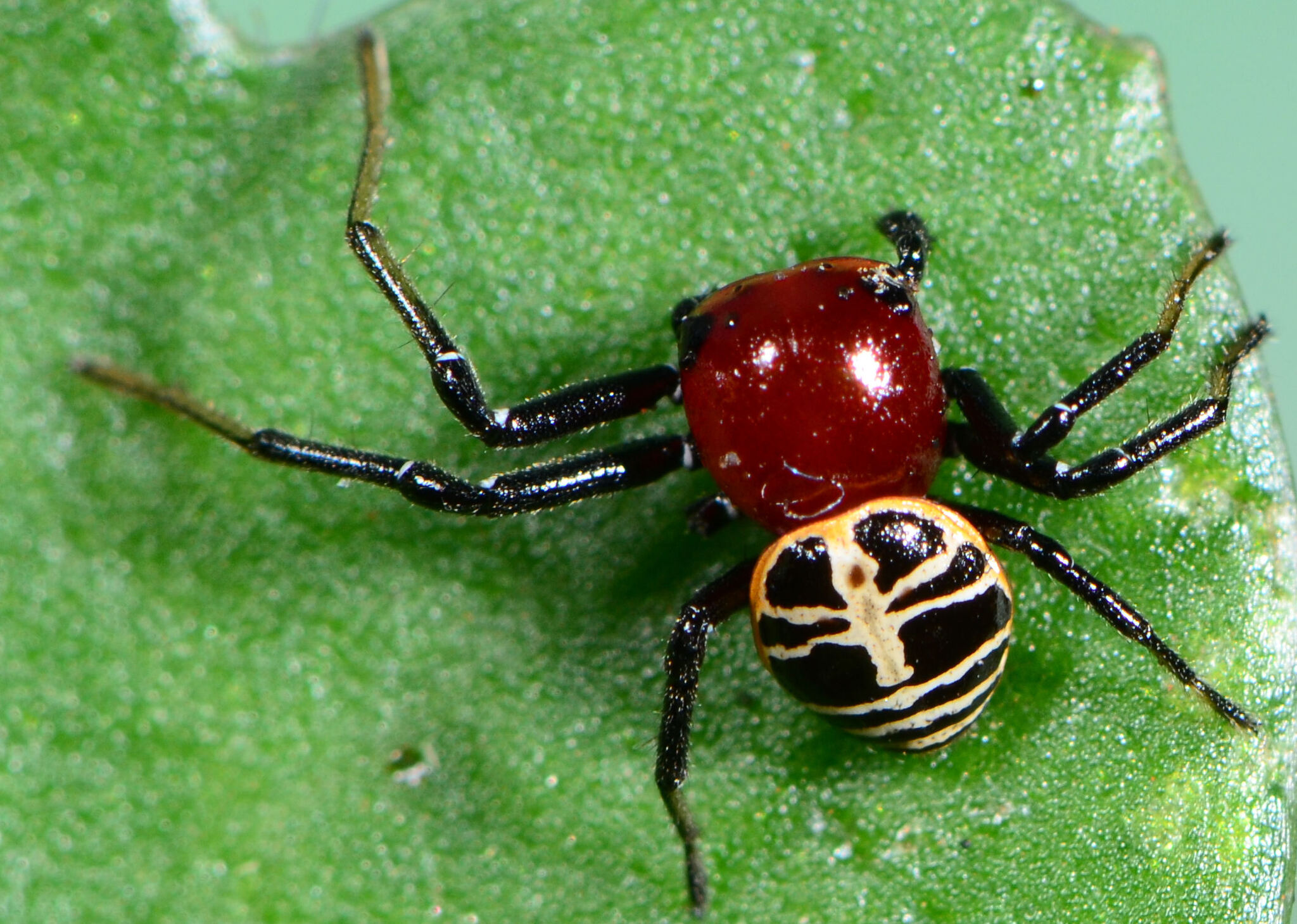
- male

Scientific classification
- Kingdom: Animalia
- Phylum: Arthropoda
- Subphylum: Chelicerata
- Class: Arachnida
- Order: Araneae
- Infraorder: Araneomorphae
- Family: Thomisidae
- Genus: Camaricus
- Species: C. nigrotesselatus

Binomial name
- Camaricus nigrotesselatus Simon, 1895

Synonyms
- Camaricus marmoratus Pocock, 1900

= Camaricus nigrotesselatus =

Ladybird crab spider

Species of spider

Camaricus nigrotesselatus is a species of crab spider in the family Thomisidae. It is commonly known as the ladybird crab spider. The species is found in Southern Africa.

== Etymology ==
The specific name nigrotesselatus is derived from Latin, combining nigro- (meaning "black") and tessellatus (meaning "checkered" or "tessellated"), referring to the distinctive black patterns on the spider's yellow opisthosoma.

== Distribution ==
Camaricus nigrotesselatus has been recorded from the Democratic Republic of the Congo, Zambia, Malawi, Namibia, Zimbabwe, Mozambique, and South Africa. In South Africa, the species is quite widespread and can be found in eight provinces, occurring mostly in the south, east, and north of the country.

== Habitat ==
The species is found on vegetation, typically in grasslands and in the herb layer.

== Description ==
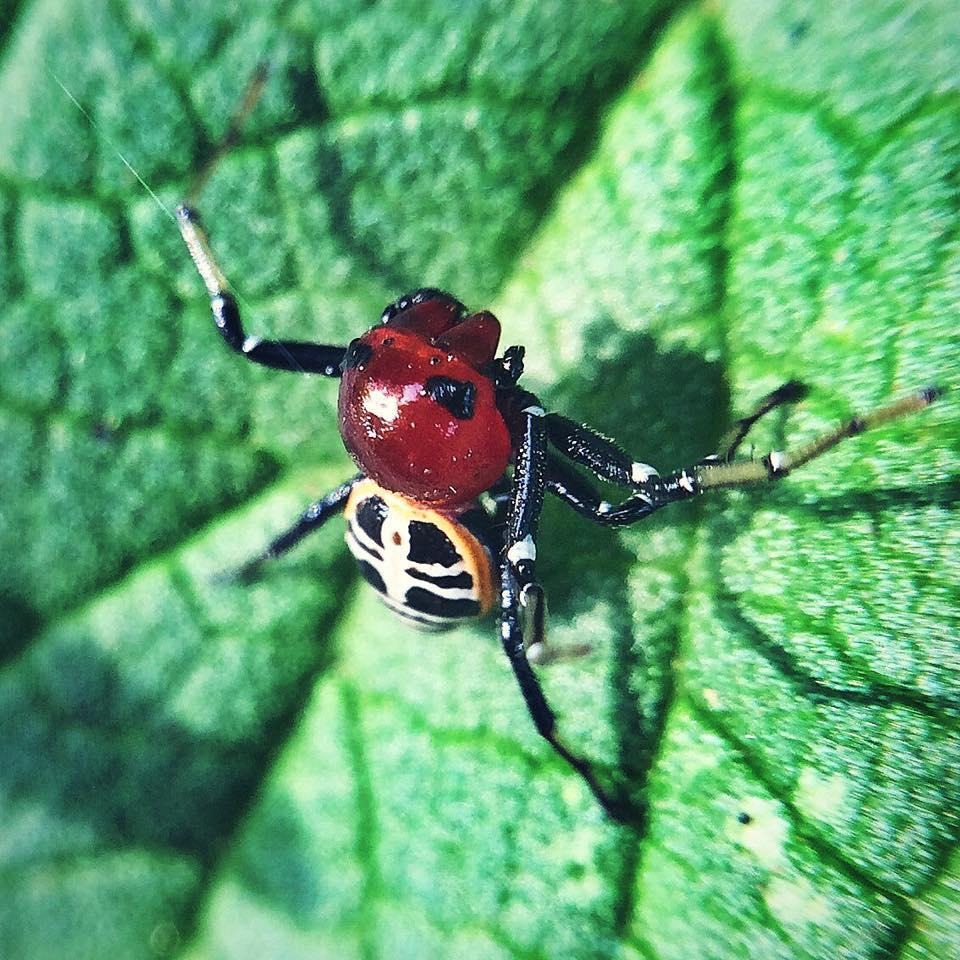
from Durban

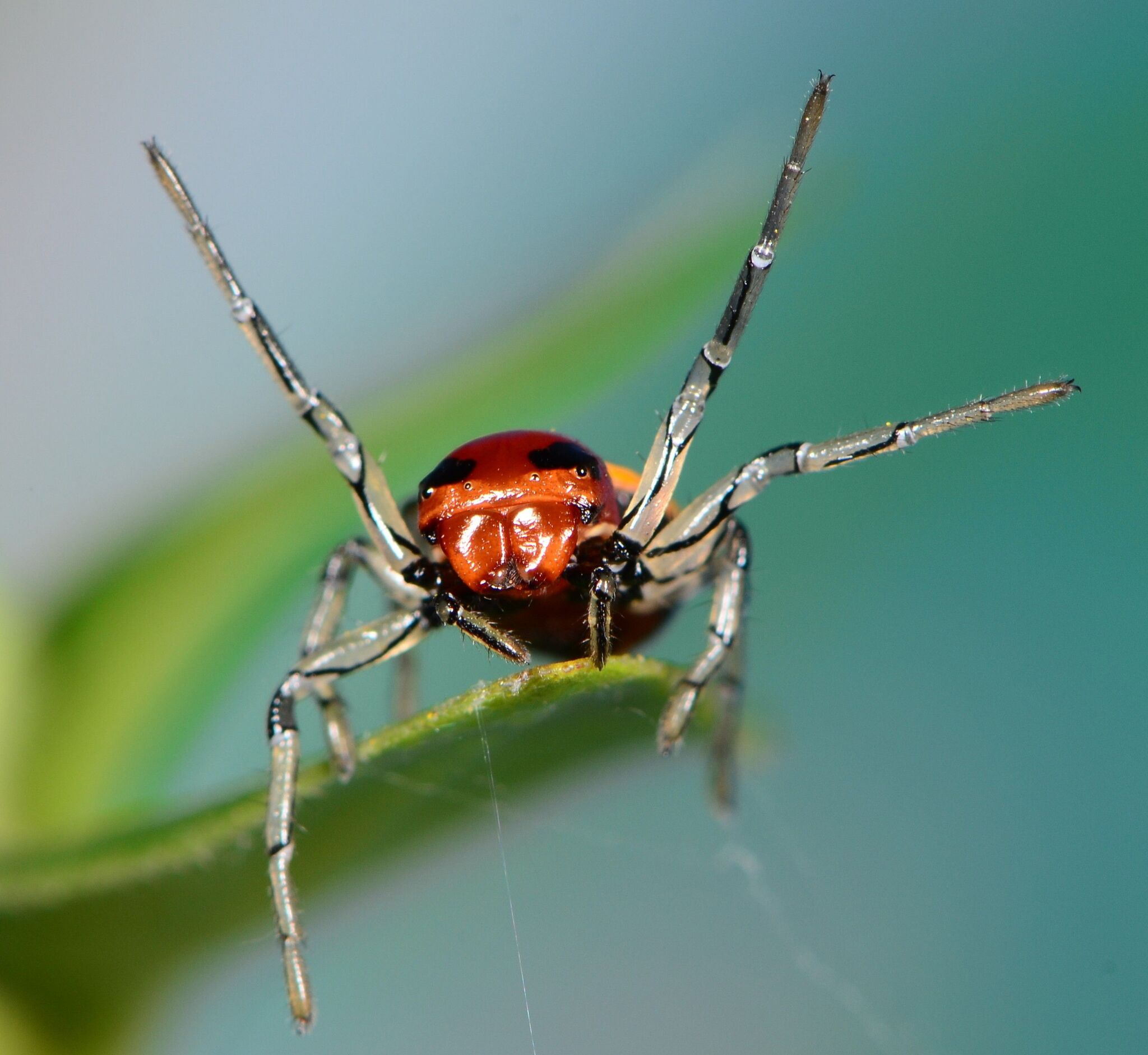
female

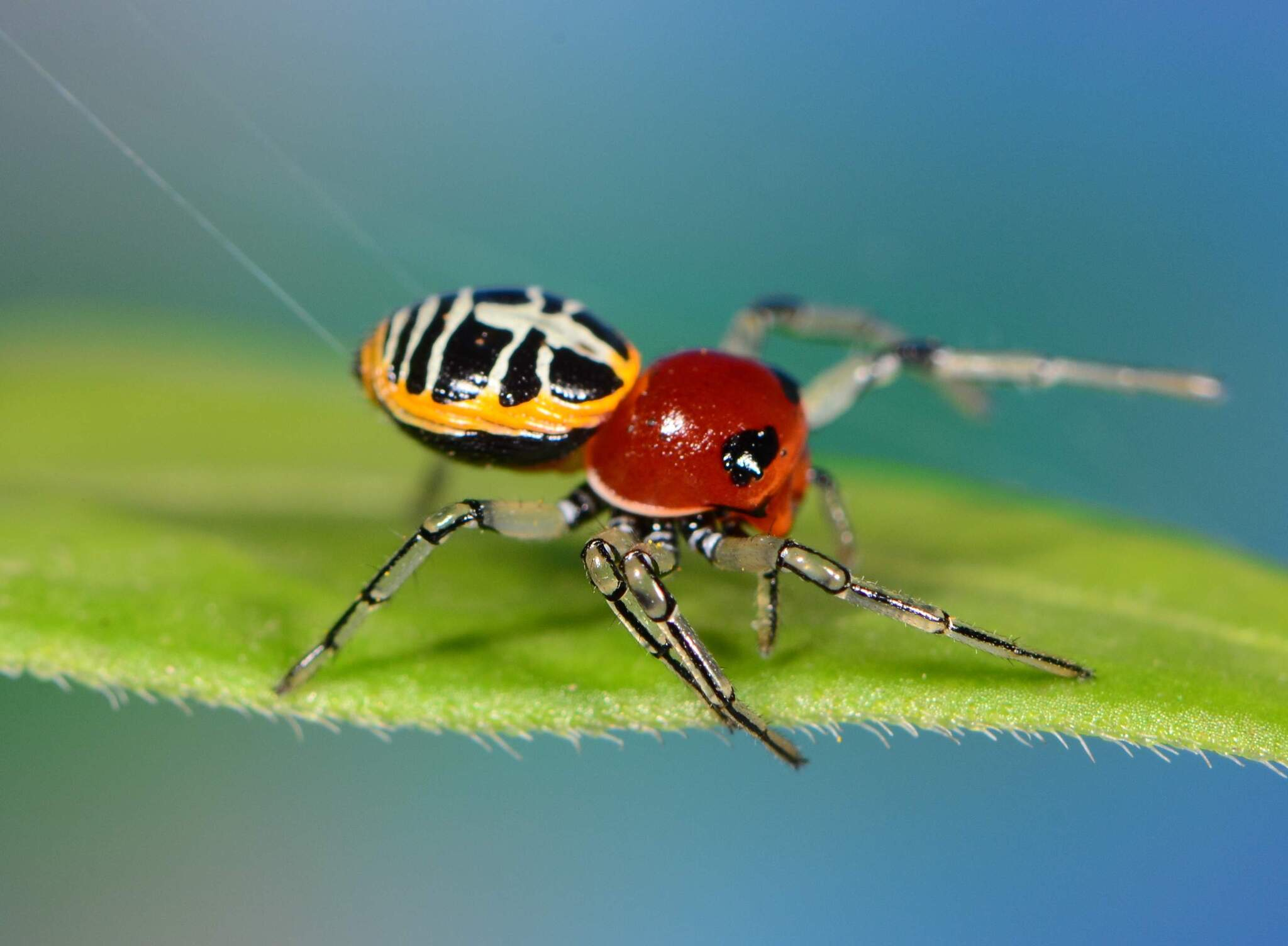
female

== Behavior and ecology ==
Like other crab spiders, C. nigrotesselatus is an ambush predator that does not build webs to capture prey.

Its bright coloration may serve as a form of aposematism or could function in species recognition, though the exact purpose remains to be studied in detail.

== Taxonomy ==
The species was first described by Eugène Simon in 1895. It was later synonymized with Camaricus marmoratus Pocock, 1900 by Embrik Strand in 1907, who recognized them as the same species.
