= Rafiuddin Ahmed (dentist) =

Indian dentist

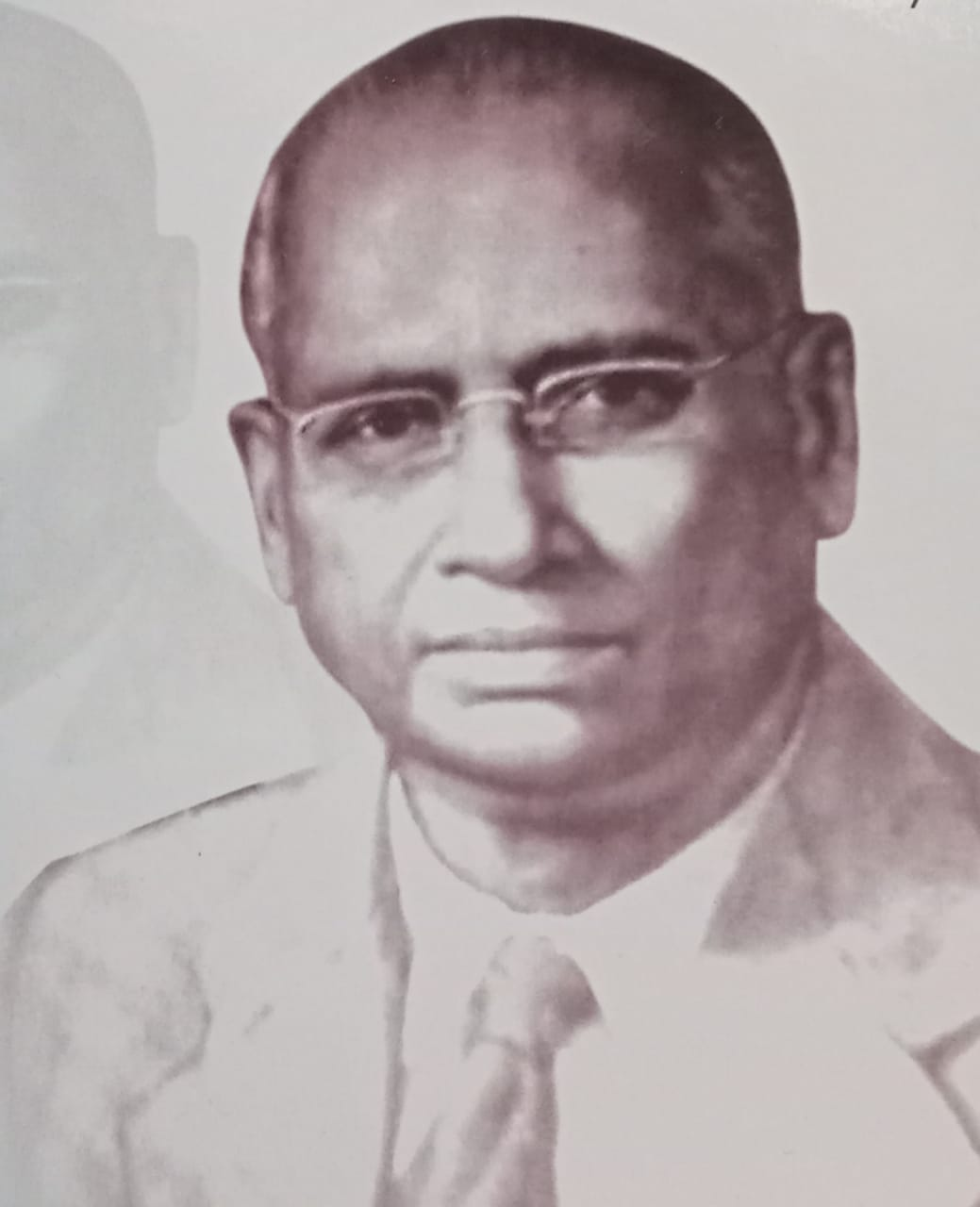
- Rafiuddin Ahmed
- Born: 24 December 1890; Bardhanpara, Bengal Presidency, British India
- Died: 9 February 1965 (aged 74); Calcutta, West Bengal, India
- Education: Aligarh Muslim University; University of Iowa College of Dentistry
- Occupation: Dentist
- Children: Amina Ahmed Kar

Rafiuddin Ahmed (24 December 1890 – 9 February 1965) was an Indian dentist, educator and later minister in the West Bengal cabinet, who founded the first dental college of India,'The Calcutta Dental College', later named Dr. R. Ahmed Dental College and Hospital, where he remained its principal until 1950. He established the Indian Dental Journal in 1925, and played a key role in founding the Bengal Dentist Act in 1939. In 1946, he established The Bengal Dental Association which was then renamed as the Indian Dental Association. The Government of India awarded him the Padma Bhushan in 1964. Remembered as the father of modern dentistry in India, in 2016, the Indian Dental Association declared 24 December as National Dentist's Day in his honour.

== Early life ==
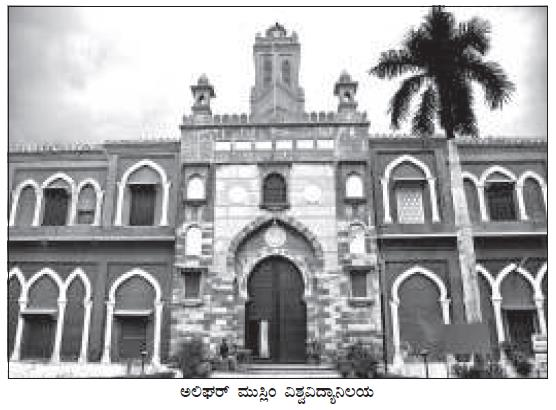
Aligarh Muslim University (1920)

Rafiuddin Ahmed was born on 24 December 1890, in Bardhanpara, East Bengal, British India; the second child of the deputy collector Maulvi Safiuddin Ahmed and his wife Faizunnesha. He had four brothers and one sister, and completed his early education at the Dhaka Madrasa, later Collegiate School. In 1908, he graduated from Aligarh Muslim University.

In 1909, after his father's death, Ahmed travelled at first to Bombay (now Mumbai), then the UK, and subsequently the United States, where he gained admission to the University of Iowa College of Dentistry. In 1915, he received his dental (D.D.S) degree. Until 1918, during the First World War, he practised at the Forsyth Dental Infirmary for Children in Boston, Massachusetts.

== Career ==
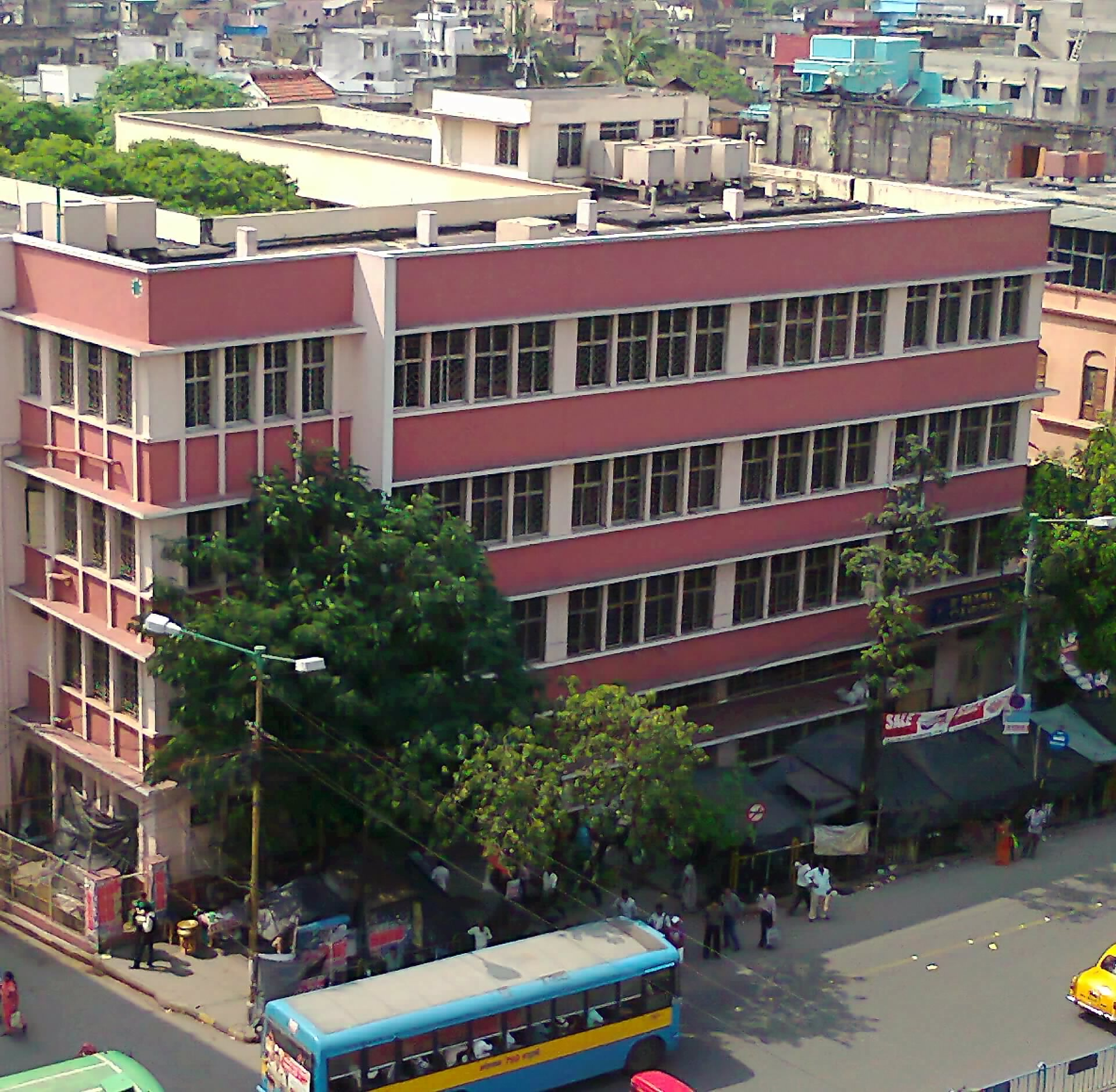
Dr. R. Ahmed Dental College & Hospital

In 1919, at the end of the First World War, Ahmed returned to India.

=== Dentistry ===
In 1920, with funding from the New York Soda Fountain, he founded and served as the first principal the first dental college of India, Dr. R. Ahmed Dental College and Hospital, a European-style establishment where he remained its principal until 1950. For the first three years, it had 11 students, one of whom was Fatima Jinnah, a future founder of Pakistan.

In 1925, he established the Indian Dental Journal and served as its editor until 1946. By 1928, the college was established as an organised institution for the education of dental studies. In that year, he published the first student's handbook on Operative Dentistry.

In 1946, he established The Bengal Dental Association which was then renamed as the Indian Dental Association. He served three terms as the President of the Indian Dental Association. In 1949, the College joined the University of Calcutta. That same year, he bestowed his College to the West Bengal government and named it Calcutta Dental College.

=== Politics ===
In 1932, he was elected Councillor of the Calcutta Municipal Corporation, where he remained until 1936. That year, the College affiliated with the State Medical Facility. He had a significant role in founding the Bengal Dentist Act in 1939. Between 1942 and 1944, he became the corporation's Alderman.

In 1950 Chief Minister of West Bengal, Dr. B. C. Roy, invited Ahmed to serve in the West Bengal cabinet. He served in it as the Minister of Agriculture, Community Development, Co-operation, Relief and Rehabilitation until 1962.

He advocated for compulsory primary education.

== Awards and honours ==
Ahmed received a Fellowship from the International College of Dentists in 1947, and the Royal College of Surgeons of England and the Pierre Fauchard Academy in 1949.

In 1964, he became the first Indian dentist to be awarded the Padma Bhushan, the third highest civilian award of the republic of India.

Ahmed's honours and memorial tributes include an inscription on the ICD Memorial Roll in 1965. The Indian Dental Association recognized his contributions to Indian dentistry by establishing the Dr. R. Ahmed Memorial Oration at the 1977 Annual Indian Dental Conference. The Pierre Fauchard Academy (PFA) dedicated its 1987 quarterly PFA Journal in Ahmed's memory, and the University of Iowa College of Dentistry Alumni Association presented their First Distinguished International Alumnus Award to him in 1989.

== Death and legacy ==
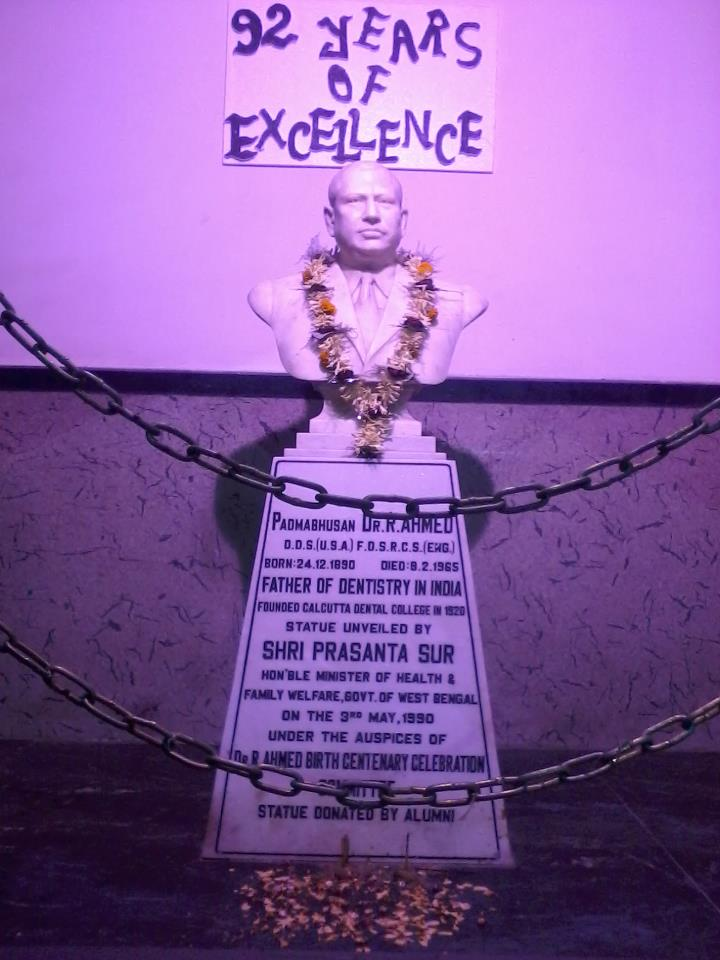
Statue of Ahmed inside the old campus of the Dr. R. Ahmed Dental College and Hospital

Ahmed died on 9 February 1965. He was buried at cemetery in Park Circus, Calcutta.

Remembered as the father of modern dentistry in India, in 2016, the Indian Dental Association declared 24 December as National Dentist Day in Ahmed's honour.

== Notable students ==
- Fatima Jinnah
- Tabitha Solomon
