= Chintamoni Kar =

Indian sculptor (1915–2005)

- Born: 19 April 1915; Kharagpur, British India (present-day Paschim Medinipur district, West Bengal, India)
- Died: 3 October 2005 (aged 90); Kolkata, West Bengal, India
- Education: Académie de la Grande Chaumière
- Spouse: Amina Ahmed Kar
- Awards: Padma Bhushan

Olympic medal record

Representing United Kingdom

Art competitions
Silver medal – second place	1948 London	Mixed Sculpturing, Statues

Chintamoni Kar (19 April 1915 – 3 October 2005) was a British-Indian sculptor. Described from The Telegraph as renowned, he received civilian awards from the Indian and French governments and won an Olympic silver medal on behalf of Great Britain.

== Personal life and studies ==
Born on 19 April 1915 in Kharagpur, West Bengal, Kar trained at the Indian Society of Oriental Art run by Abanindranath Tagore. He was taught to sculpt by Giridhari Mahapatra and Victor Giovanelli.

Kar moved to Paris in 1938 where he studied at the Académie de la Grande Chaumière before moving back to India.

Chintamoni Kar was married to Amina Ahmed Kar, who was herself an artist, and her works were largely non-figurative and abstract. The couple had one child. Both members of his family died before Chintamoni, who died on 3 October 2005 in a private hospital at the age of 90.

== Style and career ==
Kar sculpted with a variety a materials including wood, terracotta, stone, and metal. He was initially trained in an academic and representational style but also produced work of a more abstract nature.

Kar taught at the University of Calcutta and the Delhi Polytechnic and then, in 1946, moved to London where he became a member of the Royal Society of British Sculptors. He returned to West Bengal in 1956 and was then elected as Principal of the Government College of Art & Craft.

== Honours and awards ==
In 1974 he was awarded the Padma Bhushan, the third highest civilian award in the Republic of India. He was also decorated with France's highest civilian honour in 2000.

Chintamoni Kar Bird Sanctuary was named after the sculptor after he and other people from the local area fought for it to receive wildlife sanctuary status.

At the 1948 Summer Olympics Kar, entered as a competitor for Great Britain, won the silver medal for his work entitled The Stag. Held in London, the 1948 Games were the final ones to include art competitions and the International Olympic Committee no longer recognise the medals.

== Bhaskar Bhavan Administration & Maintenance Trust ==
Shortly before his death in 2005 Kar instituted the Bhaskar Bhavan Administration & Maintenance Trust at his residential campus in Narendrapur, Kolkata. It became a public museum on 19 April 2006, what would have been his 91st birthday, and houses the artist's works as well as those of his wife. The trust is active in the verification and documentation of his works along with his collection of books. It also aids poor students in the local area and holds the annual Chintamoni Kar Memorial lecture.
