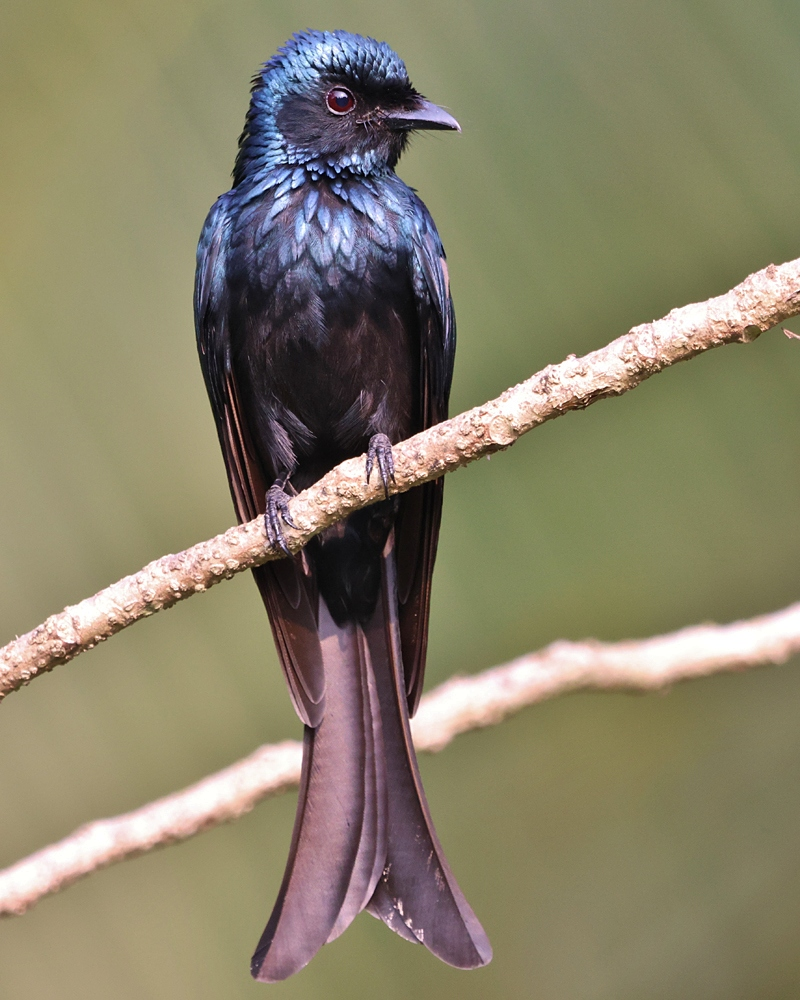
- Seen in Kannur, Kerala.

Conservation status
- Least Concern (IUCN 3.1)

Scientific classification
- Kingdom: Animalia
- Phylum: Chordata
- Class: Aves
- Order: Passeriformes
- Family: Dicruridae
- Genus: Dicrurus
- Species: D. aeneus

Binomial name
- Dicrurus aeneus Vieillot, 1817

Synonyms
- Chaptia aenea

= Bronzed drongo =

Species of bird

The bronzed drongo (Dicrurus aeneus) is a small Indomalayan bird belonging to the drongo group. They are resident in the forests of the Indian subcontinent and Southeast Asia. They capture insects flying in the shade of the forest canopy by making aerial sallies from their perches. They are very similar to the other drongos of the region but are somewhat smaller and compact with differences in the fork depth and the patterns of gloss on their feathers.

== Description ==
This drongo is somewhat smaller than the black drongo and has more metallic gloss with a spangled appearance on the head, neck and breast. The lores are velvety and the ear coverts are duller. The tail is slender and well forked with the outer tail feathers flaring outward slightly. Immatures have their axillaries tipped in white. The young bird is duller and brownish with less spangling.

The nominate race is found in India and extending until the northern part of the Malay Peninsula. Specimens from southern India are however very similar in morphometrics to those from malayensis of Burma and the size variation may be clinal. The subspecies from China kwangsiensis is treated as synonymous with aeneus. Subspecies malayensis is found from Selangor south into, Sumatra and Borneo. Taiwan is home to braunianus in the mountains of the interior.

== Distribution ==
The bronzed drongo is found in the Western Ghats and Eastern Ghats of India and the lower Himalayas from western Uttarakhand eastwards into Indochina and Hainan, the Malay Peninsula, Sumatra and northern Borneo. This species is usually found in moist broadleaved forest. This species is exclusively found in forested areas.

== Behaviour and ecology ==
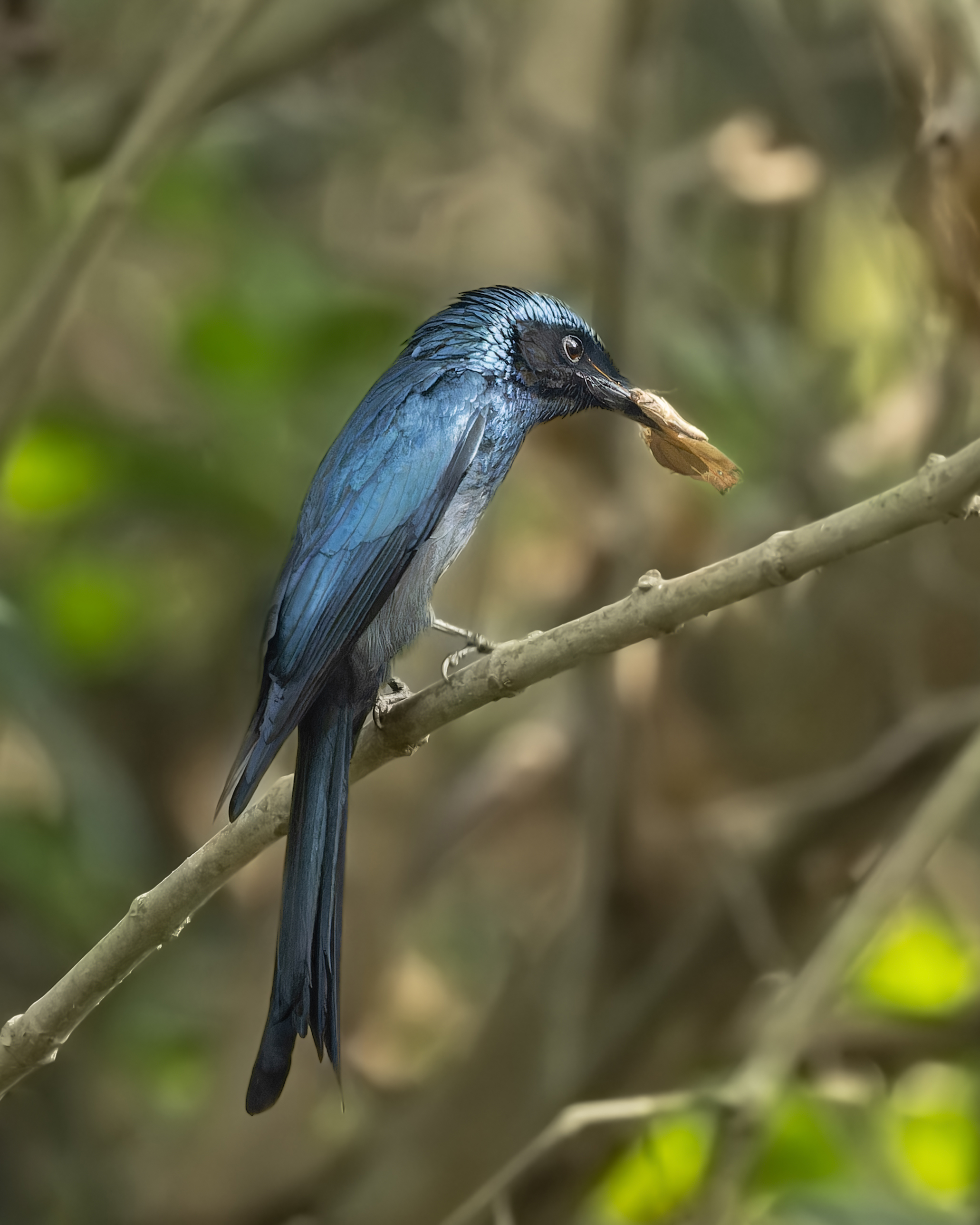
Dicrurus aeneus eating insect in Chintamoni Kar Bird Sanctuary, West Bengal, India.

They are found singly or in a group of two to three. They actively forage for insects under the forest canopy by making aerial sallies, often returning to their favourite perches. They sometimes join mixed-species foraging flocks. They are very good in mimicking calls of many other bird species which is a trait shared with many Drongo species. The breeding season is February to July. Three or four pinkish to brownish eggs are laid in a cup nest in a tree. The eggs are darker on the broad end and often have cloudy spots. The nest is covered in cobwebs and often appears whitish. These are aggressive and fearless birds, 24 cm in length, and will attack much larger species if their nest or young are threatened.

== Gallery ==
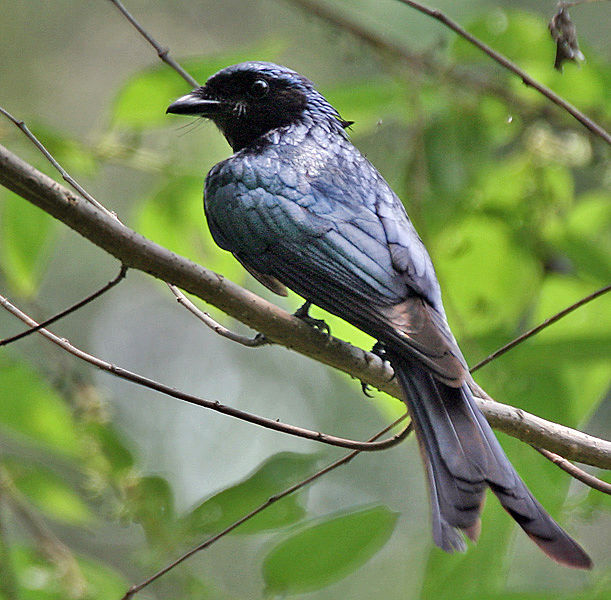
At Narendrapur near Kolkata, West Bengal, India

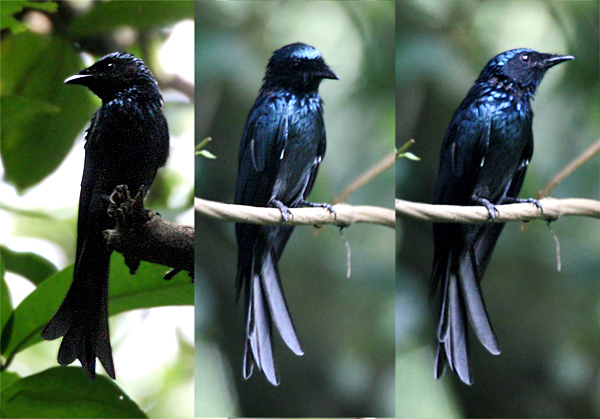
at Narendrapur near Kolkata, West Bengal, India.
