= Amina Ahmed Kar =

Artist (1930–1994)

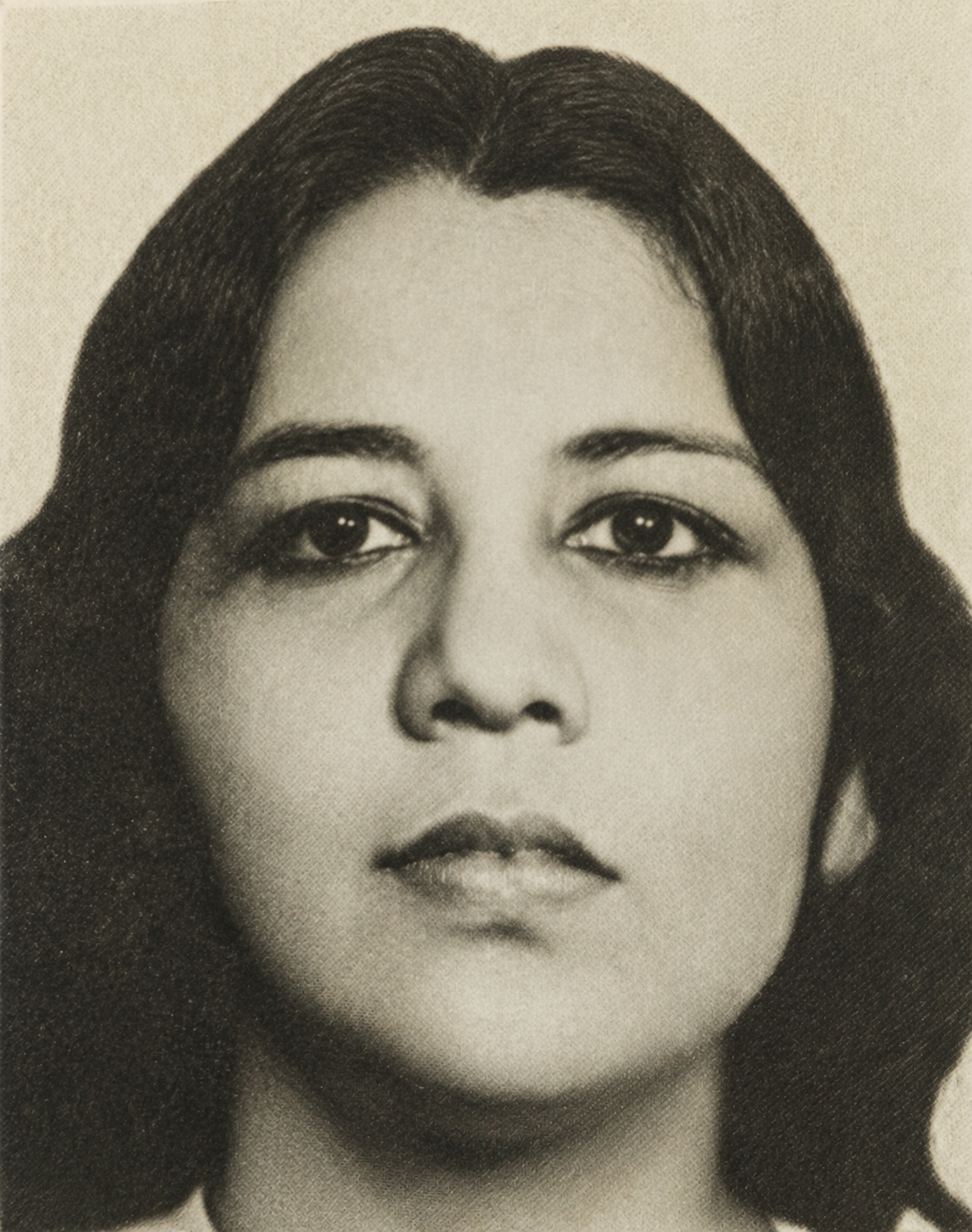
- Born: 20 February 1930; Calcutta, British India (present-day West Bengal, India)
- Died: 21 January 1994; Kolkata, West Bengal, India
- Education: Académie Julian; Sorbonne; École du Louvre; Atelier 17
- Spouse: Chintamoni Kar
- Father: Rafiuddin Ahmed (dentist)

Amina Ahmed Kar (February 20, 1930 - January 21, 1994) was an Indian painter. She was among the earliest Indian abstractionists, as works documented by Rita Regnier attest.
