= Tabitha Solomon =

Indian pioneer dentist

- Tabitha Solomon, c. 1926.
- Born: 15 November 1901; Calcutta
- Died: 30 July 1976 (aged 74); Calcutta
- Citizenship: Indian
- Education: Calcutta Dental College and Hospital
- Occupation: Dentist
- Medical career
- Profession: Dentist
- Institutions: Chittaranjan Seva Sadan Hospital; Dufferin Hospital

Tabitha Solomon (1901-1976) was one of the first women to qualify as a dentist in India, graduating from the Calcutta Dental College and Hospital in 1928. After graduation she started a dental clinic in the Chittarnjan Seva Sadan Hospital and worked at the Dufferin Hospital. A member of the Baghdadi Jewish community, she was closely involved in Jewish community causes.

== Early life and education ==
Tabitha Solomon was born in 1901 into the Baghdadi Jewish expatriate community in British India. She was one of the first women to qualify as a dentist in India, graduating from the Calcutta Dental College and Hospital (later the Dr R. Ahmed Dental College) with her Licentiate in Dental Science on 30 March 1928, five years after the only known earlier female candidate Fatima Ali Jinnah, who qualified in 1923 from the same College, and sixteen years before Vimla Sood, who qualified in dentistry from De'Montmorency College of Dentistry in Lahore in 1944.

== Career ==
Solomon worked with Rafiuddin Ahmed on the Calcutta Dental Journal and started a dental clinic in the Chittarnjan Seva Sadan Hospital. She worked at the Dufferin Hospital in an honorary capacity.

She was closely involved in Jewish causes, serving on the Women's International Zionist Organization (WIZO) and welfare committees, the Calcutta Jewish Association and the multicultural Calcutta Women's Committee.

== Personal life ==
Tabitha Solomon had two sons and a daughter, Eric, Charles and Hebe. Avi is Charles' older son born in 1956.
