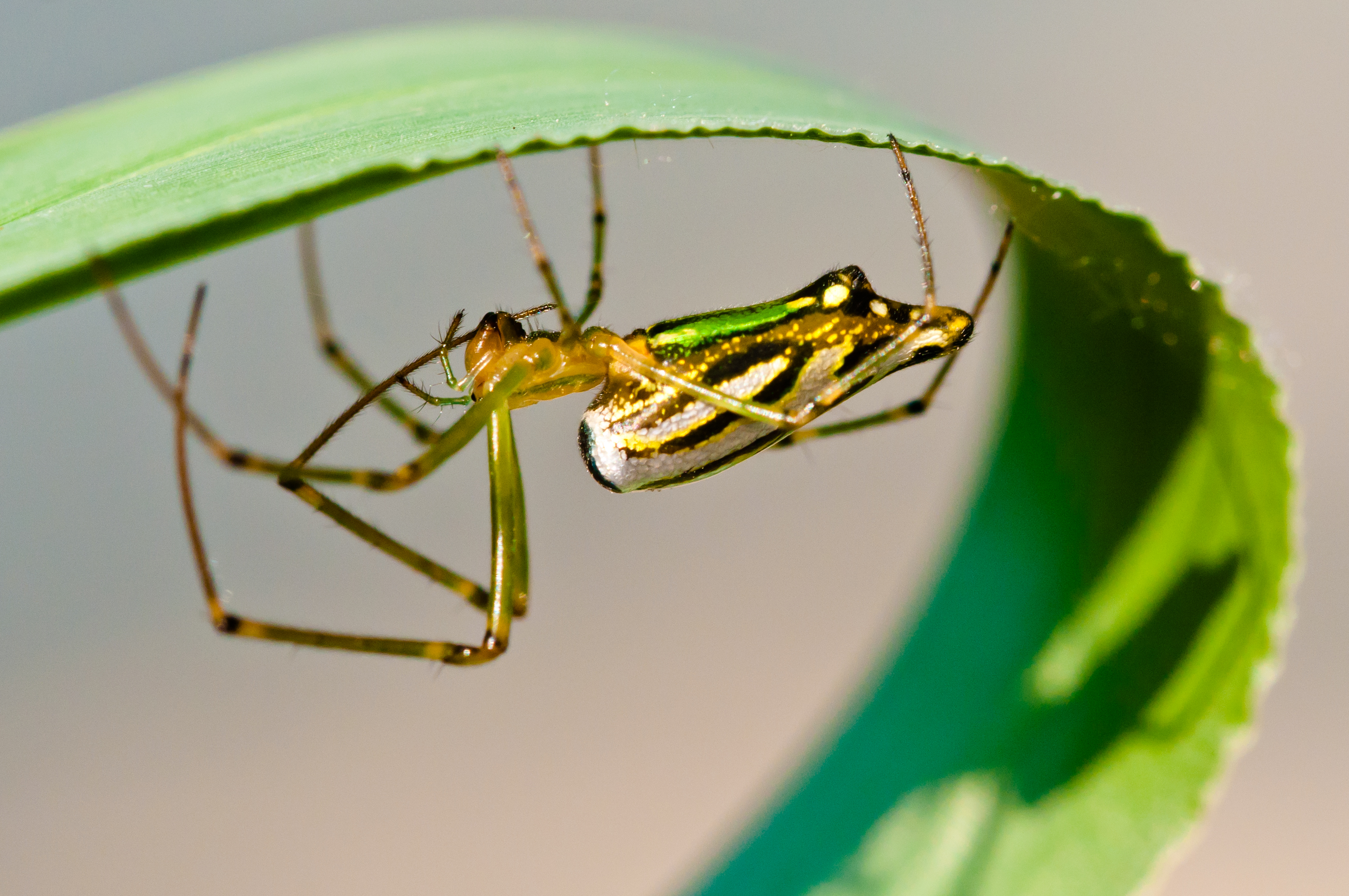

Scientific classification
- Kingdom: Animalia
- Phylum: Arthropoda
- Subphylum: Chelicerata
- Class: Arachnida
- Order: Araneae
- Infraorder: Araneomorphae
- Family: Tetragnathidae
- Genus: Leucauge
- Species: L. decorata

Binomial name
- Leucauge decorata (Walckenaer, 1842)
- blue: reported countries (WSC) green: observation hotspots (iNaturalist)

Synonyms
- Tetragnatha decorata Blackwall, 1864; Nephila angustata Stoliczka, 1869; Meta decorata L. Koch, 1872; Argyroepeira celebesiana Workman, 1896; Leucauge decorate Butt & Siraj, 2006

= Leucauge decorata =

Decorative silver orb spider

Species of spider

Leucauge decorata, the decorative silver orb spider, is one of the long-jawed orb weaver spiders. A medium to large sized orb weaving spider, with a body length up to 12 mm (0.47 in) long for females and up to 6 mm (0.24 in) for males. This species has a "point" to the end of the abdomen.

L. decorata was among the preferred spider species predated by the mud-dauber wasp Sceliphron madraspatanum for larval food in Pune city.

== Distribution ==
Leucauge decorata has a wide Paleotropic distribution. It is found in Pakistan, India, Bangladesh, Thailand, Philippines, China, Japan, Indonesia, Papua New Guinea, and Australia.

In Africa, it is recorded from Botswana, Comoros, Tanzania, and South Africa.

== Habitat and ecology ==
The species builds large orb-webs, sometimes near water or in shaded damp areas. They are active during the day, hanging head down in their webs.

It is found in forests, grasslands, rice fields, and urban areas. In urban areas, streetlights attracted insects leading to more webs of L. decorata on trees beside such lights.

In South Africa, L. decorata has been sampled from Fynbos, Forest, Indian Ocean Coastal Belt, Grassland, Nama Karoo, and Savanna biomes at altitudes ranging from 4 to 1,842 m, as well as from citrus orchards, maize fields, and commercial pine plantations.

== Description ==
The species is medium-sized with an elongate abdomen that extends in a tail-like manner posteriorly past the spinnerets. The abdomen has green bands on a white background.

The male palp is very long. The epigyne is flat with two half circles.

== Taxonomy ==
The species was originally described by John Blackwall in 1864 from East India as Tetragnatha decorata.
