= Dr. R. Ahmed Dental College and Hospital =

Government dental college in India

- ডাঃ আর. আহমেদ ডেন্টাল কলেজ ও হাসপাতাল
- Former names: Calcutta Dental College and Hospital (1965)
- Motto: Liberty Equality Fraternity
- Type: Public dental college & hospital
- Established: 1920; 106 years ago
- Founder: Dr. Rafiuddin Ahmed
- Affiliations: National Dental Commission
- Academic affiliations: West Bengal University of Health Sciences
- Principal: Dr. Sailendra Nath Biswas
- Location: 114, A.J.C. Bose Road, Sealdah, Kolkata-700014, West Bengal, India; 22°33′45.7″N 88°22′4.5″E
- Campus: Urban
- Website: radch.edu.in

The Dr. R. Ahmed Dental College and Hospital is a government dental college located in Sealdah, Kolkata, in the state of West Bengal, India. It is affiliated to the West Bengal University of Health Sciences and is recognised by the National Dental Commission. It teaches Bachelor of Dental Surgery (BDS) and Master of Dental Surgery (MDS) courses in various specialties. It is the first Dental college in South-east Asia. Students are trained in General Medicine and Surgery from the nearby Nil Ratan Sircar Medical College and Hospital.

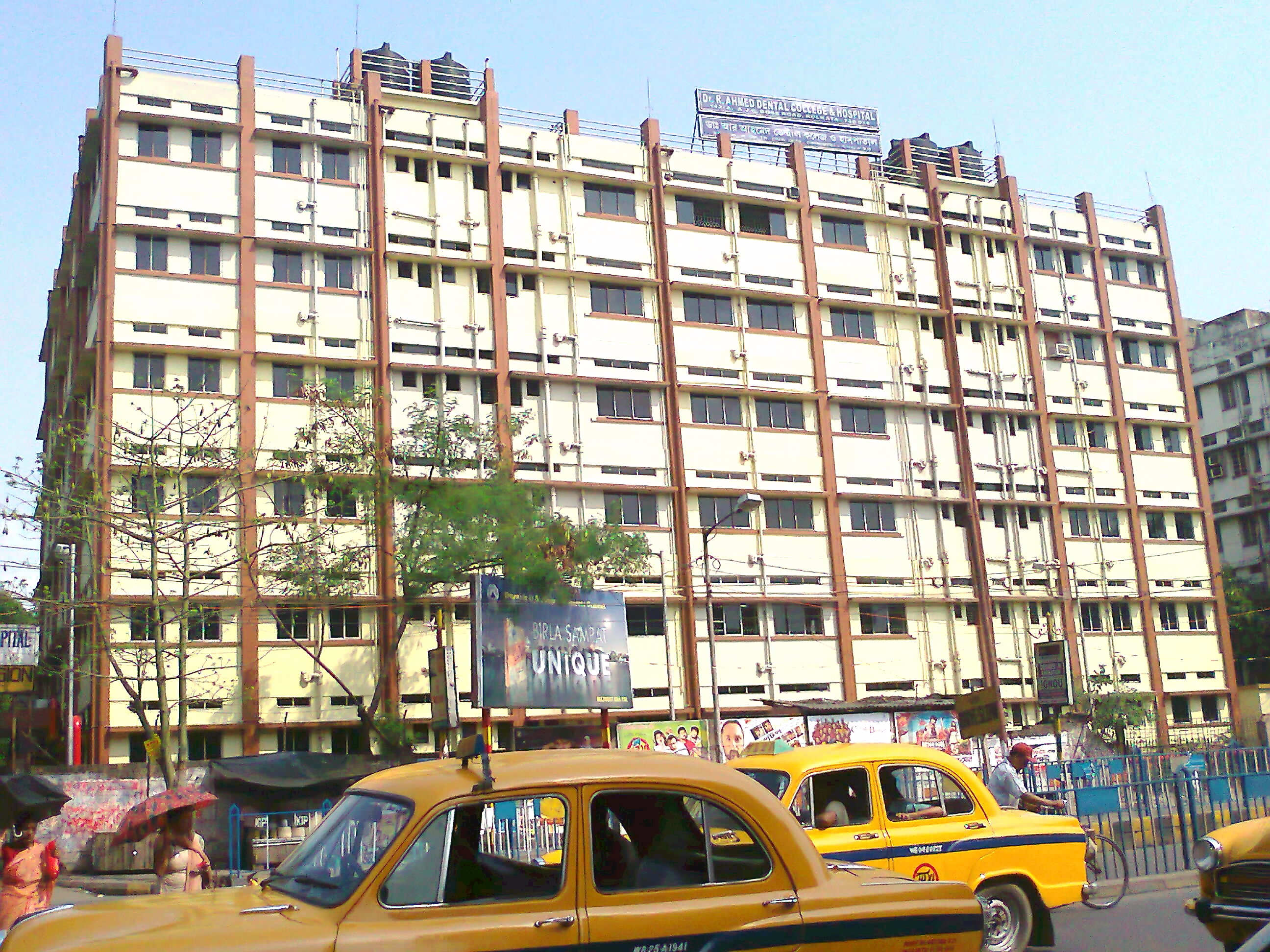
Dr. R. Ahmed Dental College & Hospital (new campus)

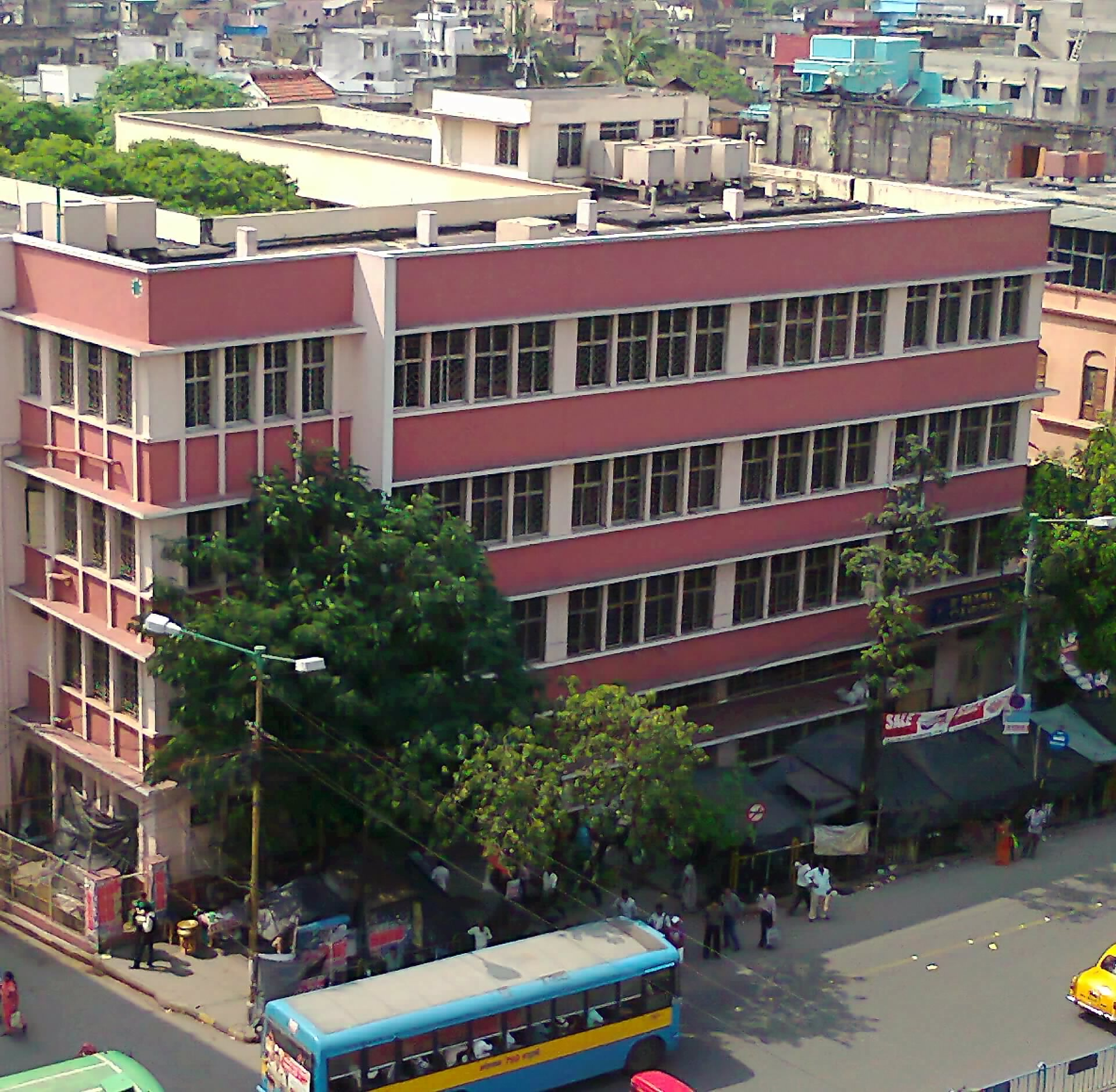
Dr. R. Ahmed Dental College & Hospital (old campus)

== History ==
One of the oldest colleges in Southeast Asia owes its existence to Rafiuddin Ahmed (1890–1965). This college has produced many notable graduates in the field of dentistry and surgery. It is India's first dental college. It was established by Dr. Rafiuddin Ahmed, an alumnus of University of Iowa, where he completed his DDS degree. He founded Calcutta Dental College and Hospital based on the American model of dentistry. After Indian Independence, he gifted the college to the Government of West Bengal. Later, the college was renamed in his honour.

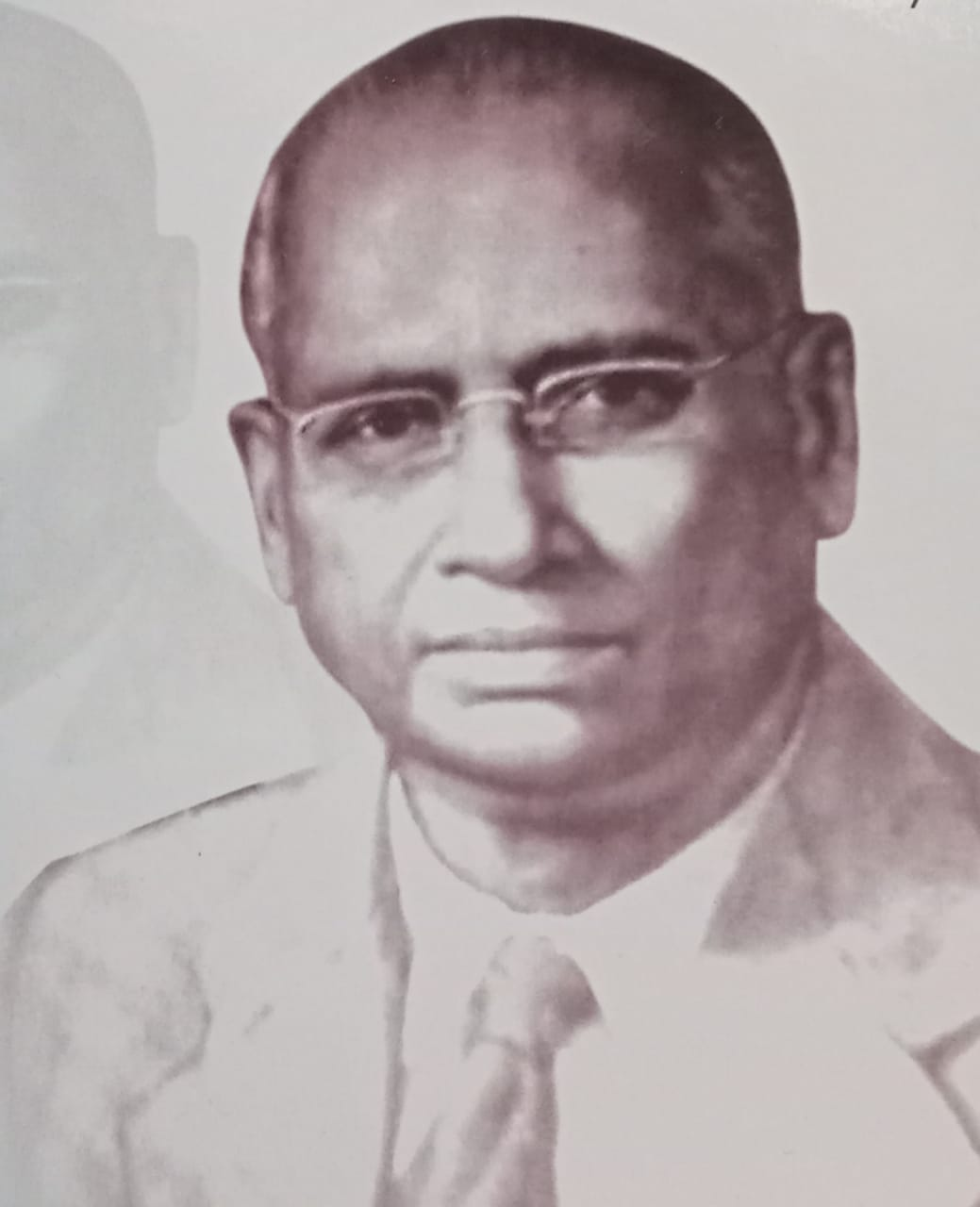
Dr. Rafiuddin Ahmed

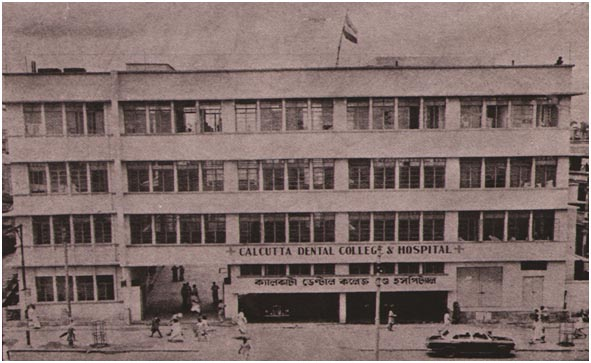
Calcutta Dental College and Hospital, 1920s

== Courses offered ==
Dr. R. Ahmed Dental College (BDS) is a four-year undergraduate program followed by one year of mandatory rotatory internship. Upon completion, graduates earn a Bachelor of Dental Surgery (BDS) degree. The postgraduate program requires three years to earn a Master of Dental Surgery (MDS) degree. MDS is offered in the following specialties:

- Oral & Maxillofacial Surgery
- Orthodontics and Dentofacial Orthopaedics
- Conservative Dentistry and Endodontics
- Paedodontics
- Periodontics
- Prosthodontics and Maxillofacial Prosthesis
- Oral and Maxillofacial Pathology

== Departments ==
- Oral & Maxillofacial Surgery
- Orthodontics and Dentofacial Orthopaedics
- Conservative Dentistry and Endodontics
- Pedodontics and Preventive Dentistry
- Periodontics
- Public Health Dentistry
- Prosthodontics and Maxillofacial Prosthesis
- Oral and Maxillofacial Pathology and Oral Microbiology
- Oral Medicine and Radiology

== Infrastructure ==
The institution has facilities with more than 350 dental chairs. The institute is divided into two campuses: the new campus and the old campus.

The undergraduate and postgraduate training for both pre-clinical and clinical aspects are imparted at the New and old campuses. Clinical facilities for training in medical subjects are available at the NRS Medical College.

Hostel facilities are available for both boys and girls.

- Boys' hostel superintendent: Dr. Aritra Chatterjee
- Girls' hostel superintendent: Dr. Nayana Dey

== Admission ==
The institution enrolls undergraduates based on their NEET UG scores and admits postgraduates based on their scores in the NEET MDS conducted by the NBE (National Board of Examination) held annually.

- Annual BDS intake: 125
- Annual MDS intake: 33

== Notable alumni ==
- Fatima Jinnah
- Tabitha Solomon
