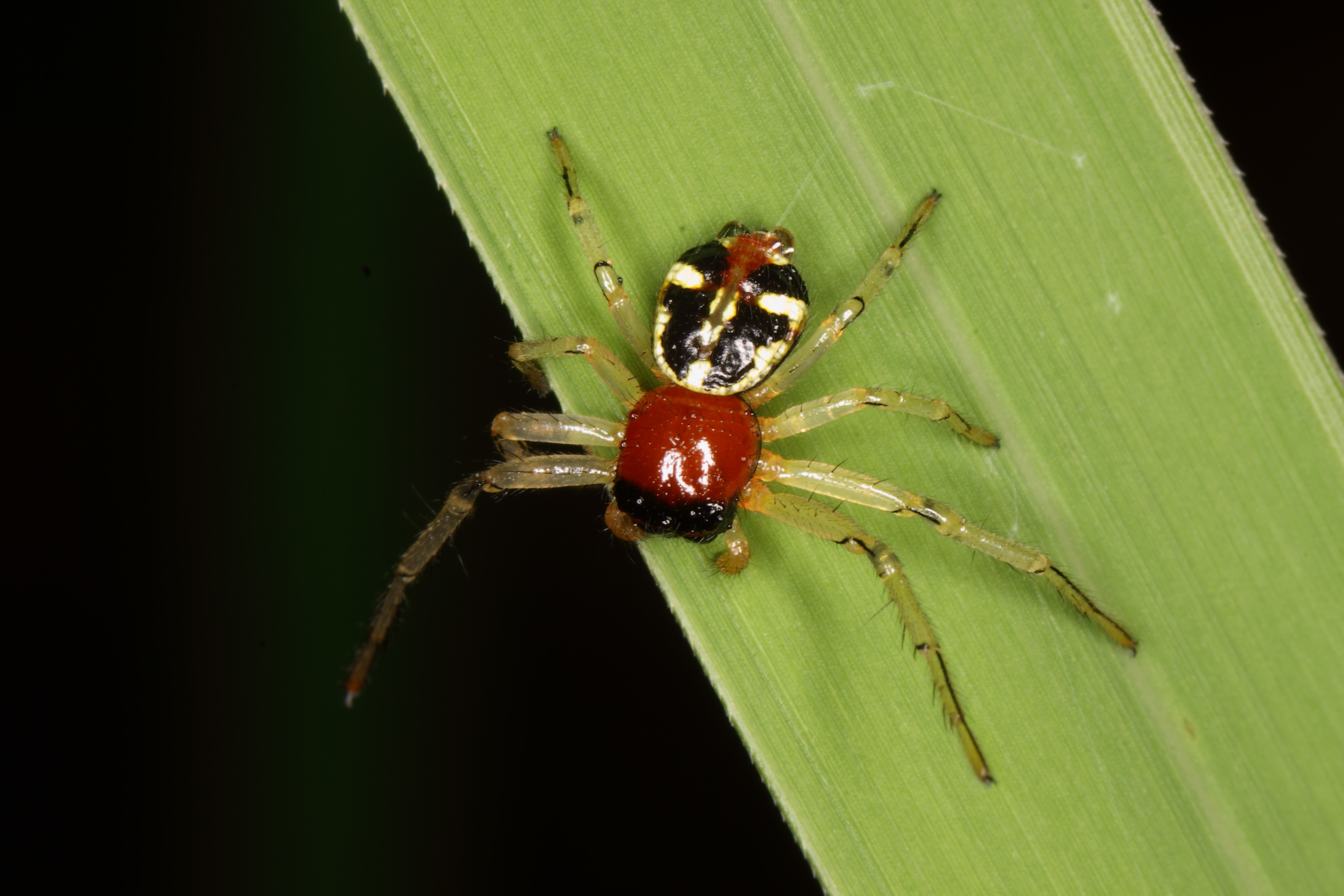
- C. maugei
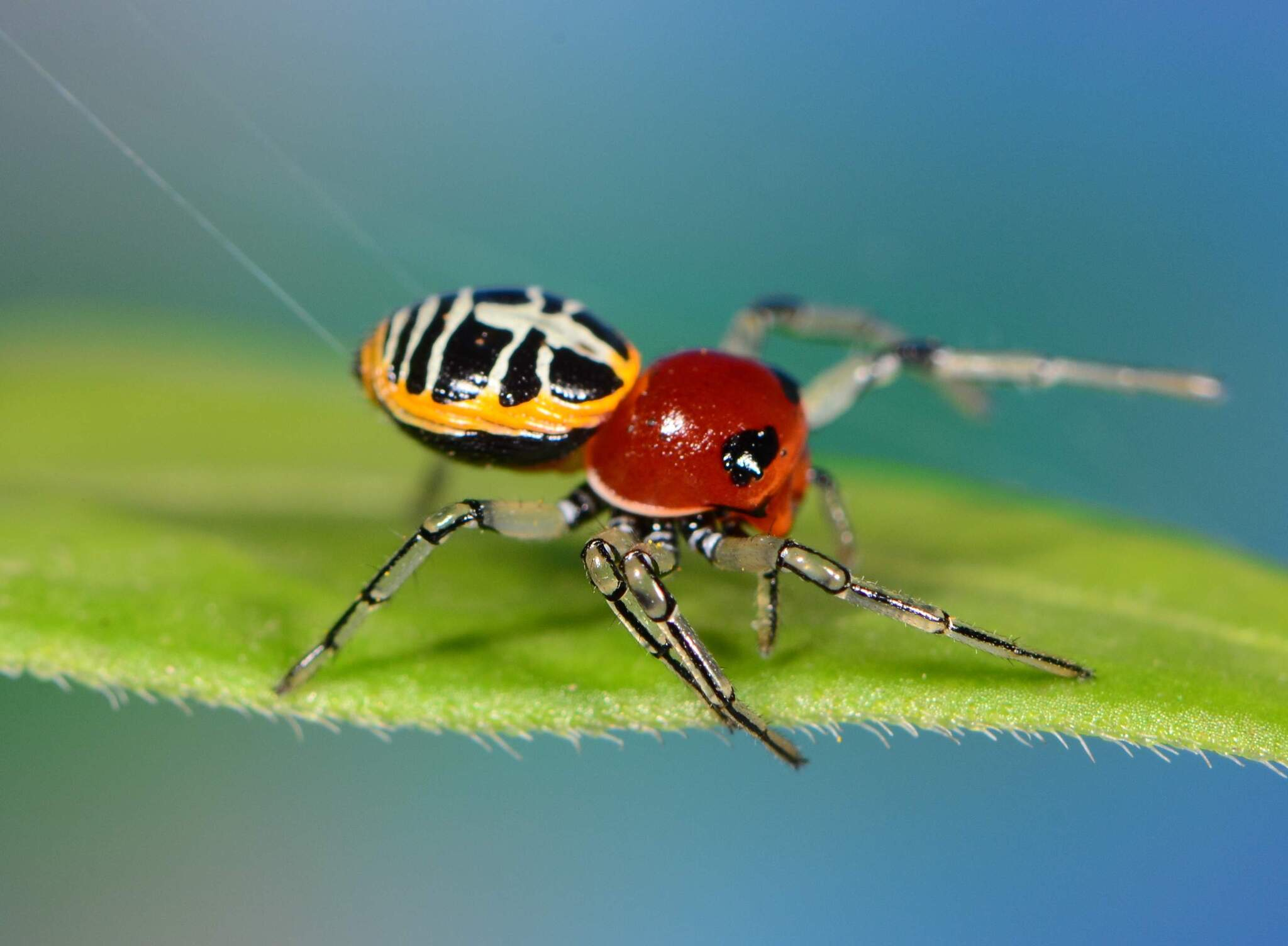
- female C. nigrotesselatus

Scientific classification
- Kingdom: Animalia
- Phylum: Arthropoda
- Subphylum: Chelicerata
- Class: Arachnida
- Order: Araneae
- Infraorder: Araneomorphae
- Family: Thomisidae
- Genus: Camaricus; Thorell, 1887

Type species
- C. maugei (Walckenaer, 1837)

Species
- 14, see text

= Camaricus =

Genus of spiders

Camaricus is a genus of crab spiders that was first described by Tamerlan Thorell in 1887.

== Distribution ==
Species in this genus are found in Africa, Asia, and on New Caledonia.

== Life style ==
Camaricus can be found on vegetation, usually in grass and in the herb layer.

== Description ==
Females and males are 7 to 9 mm in total length. The carapace is reddish brown, shiny, and evenly convex dorsally with black spots over the lateral eyes. The median ocular quadrangle is wider than long and narrower anteriorly than posteriorly. The anterior eye row is slightly recurved while the posterior eye row is more strongly recurved.

The abdomen is round and slightly flattened dorsally, decorated with distinct yellow and black patterns. The legs are paler with distinct longitudinal bands or spots, and legs I and II are not much longer than III and IV.

Males resemble the female but are only slightly smaller with dark legs.

== Species ==
As of October 2025, this genus includes fourteen species:

- Camaricus castaneiceps Berland, 1924 – New Caledonia
- Camaricus chayani Biswas & Raychaudhuri, 2017 – Bangladesh
- Camaricus cimex (Karsch, 1878) – Tanzania
- Camaricus florae Barrion & Litsinger, 1995 – Philippines
- Camaricus formosus Thorell, 1887 – India to Indonesia (Sumatra), China, Philippines (type species)
- Camaricus khandalaensis Tikader, 1980 – India
- Camaricus maugei (Walckenaer, 1837) – India to Vietnam, Indonesia (Sumatra, Java, Krakatau)
- Camaricus medog Wang, Lu & Z. S. Zhang, 2024 – China
- Camaricus mimus (Pavesi, 1895) – Ethiopia, Tanzania
- Camaricus nigrotesselatus Simon, 1895 – DR Congo, Zambia, Malawi, Namibia, Zimbabwe, Mozambique, South Africa
- Camaricus parisukatus Barrion & Litsinger, 1995 – Philippines
- Camaricus pulchellus Simon, 1903 – Vietnam
- Camaricus rinkae Biswas & Roy, 2005 – India
- Camaricus siltorsus Saha & Raychaudhuri, 2007 – India

Nomen dubium

- C. nigrotesselatus Strand, 1907

== See also ==
- List of Thomisidae species
