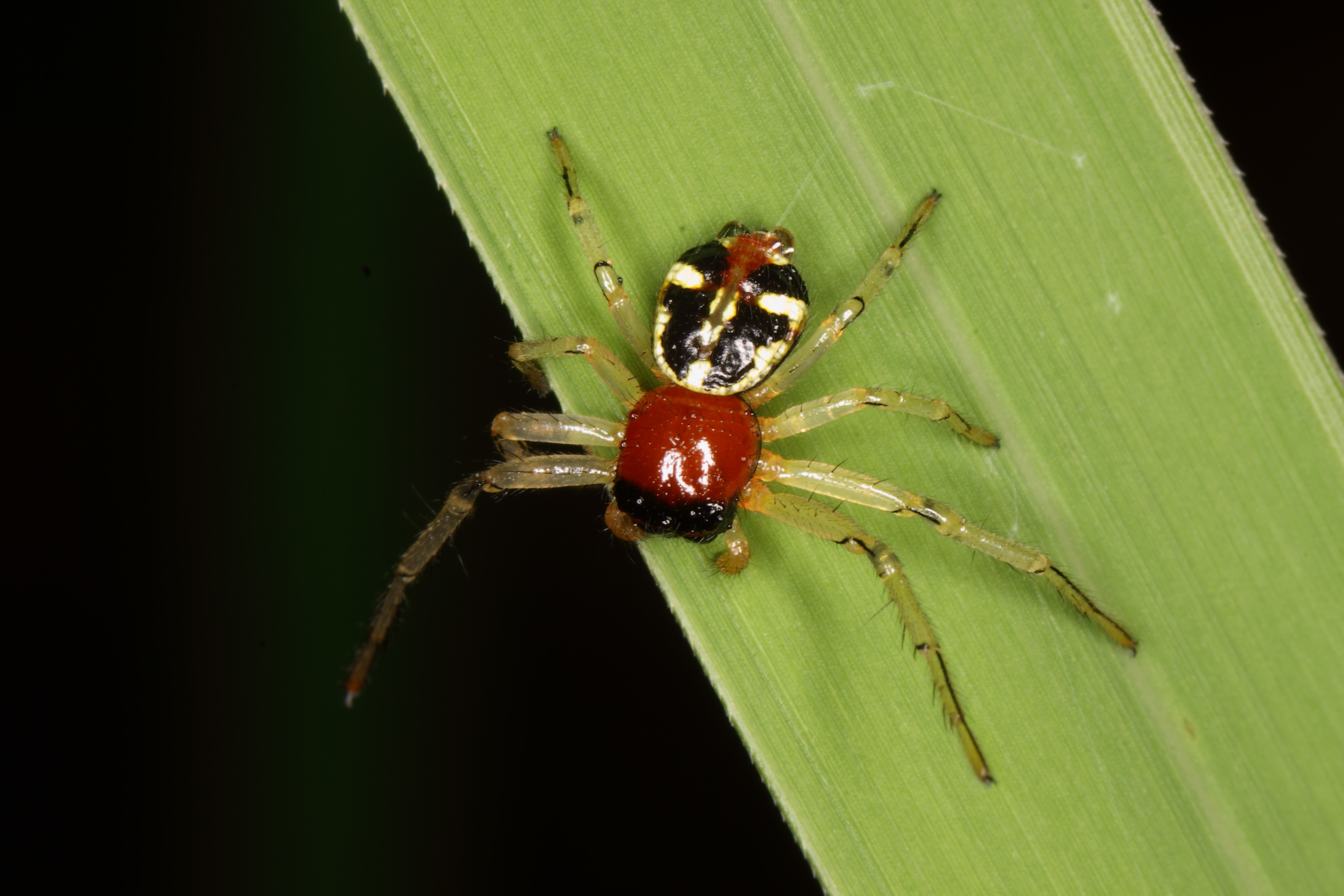
- female from Java
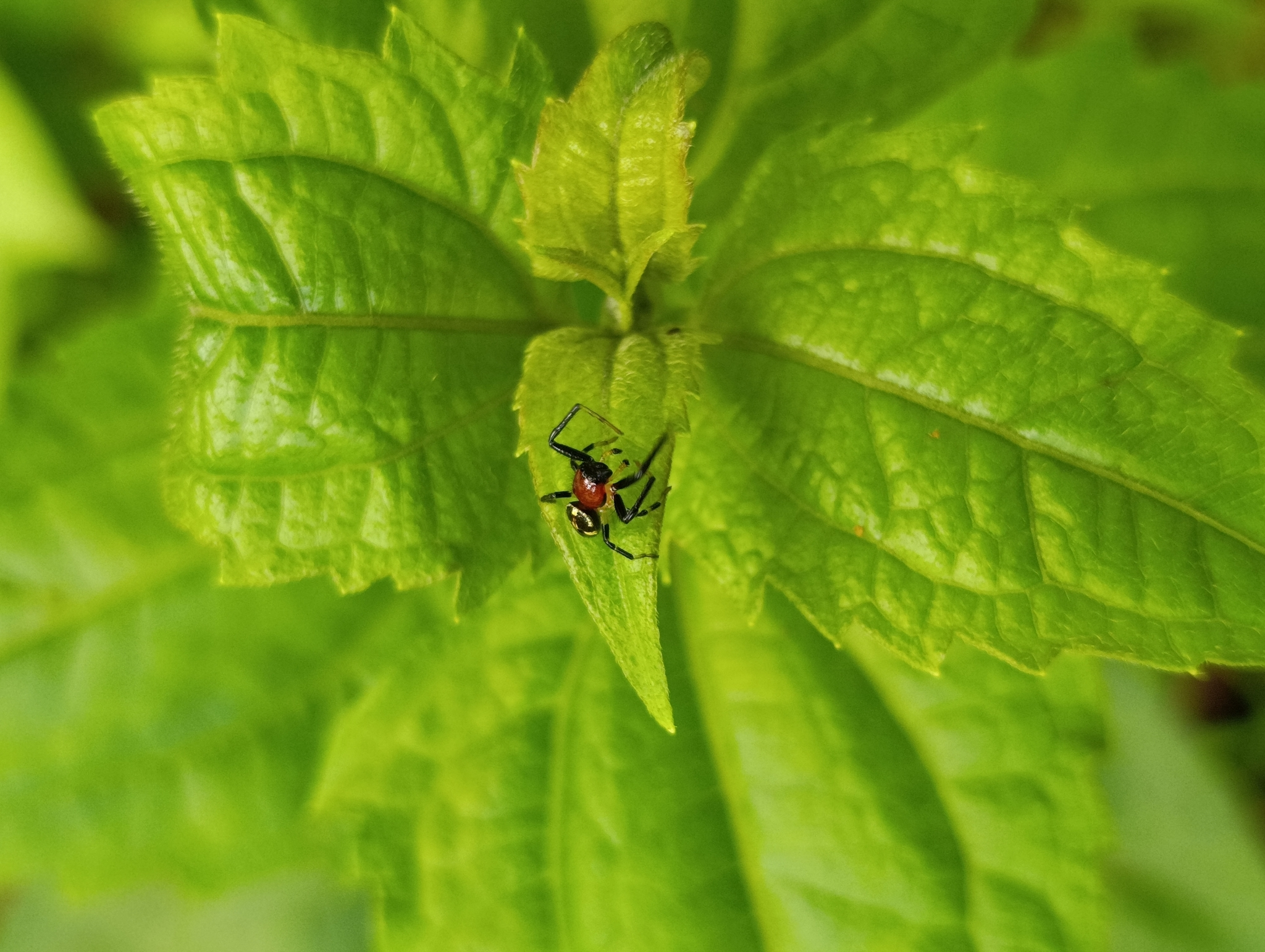
- male from Vietnam

Scientific classification
- Kingdom: Animalia
- Phylum: Arthropoda
- Subphylum: Chelicerata
- Class: Arachnida
- Order: Araneae
- Infraorder: Araneomorphae
- Family: Thomisidae
- Genus: Camaricus
- Species: C. maugei

Binomial name
- Camaricus maugei (Walckenaer, 1837)

Synonyms
- Thomisus maugi Walckenaer, 1837; Thomisus stellifer Doleschall, 1859; Chorizopsis maugei (Walckenaer, 1837); Platythomisus striatipes van Hasselt, 1882; Camaricus striatipes Thorell, 1894; Camaricus formosus Thorell, 1877

= Camaricus maugei =

Flat Abdomen Crab Spider

Species of spider

Camaricus maugei is a species of crab spider in the family Thomisidae. It has a wide distribution across tropical Asia, ranging from India to Vietnam, and including Indonesia (specifically Sumatra, Java, and Krakatau).

== Etymology ==
The species epithet maugei is a patronym honoring René Maugé de Cely.

== Distribution ==
C. maugei has been recorded from India to Vietnam, and throughout much of Indonesia, including the islands of Sumatra, Java, and Krakatau.

== Description ==
Based on the original descriptions, C. maugei is a crab spider with distinctive coloration patterns. The abdomen is oval-shaped and notably larger at the posterior end, appearing black with a yellow or reddish cross-like marking in the middle of the dorsal surface. Along the transverse bar of this cross, near the spinnerets, are two deeply sunken, very distinct points.

The cephalothorax is brilliant red and not flattened on the sides, with a red sternum. The chelicerae are wedge-shaped, flattened, and black with a large red spot on the side. The pedipalps are reddish with black tips, though somewhat swollen. The legs show sexual dimorphism in coloration: the thighs and tibiae of the first two pairs are black, while the tarsi are whitish-yellow with black markings.
