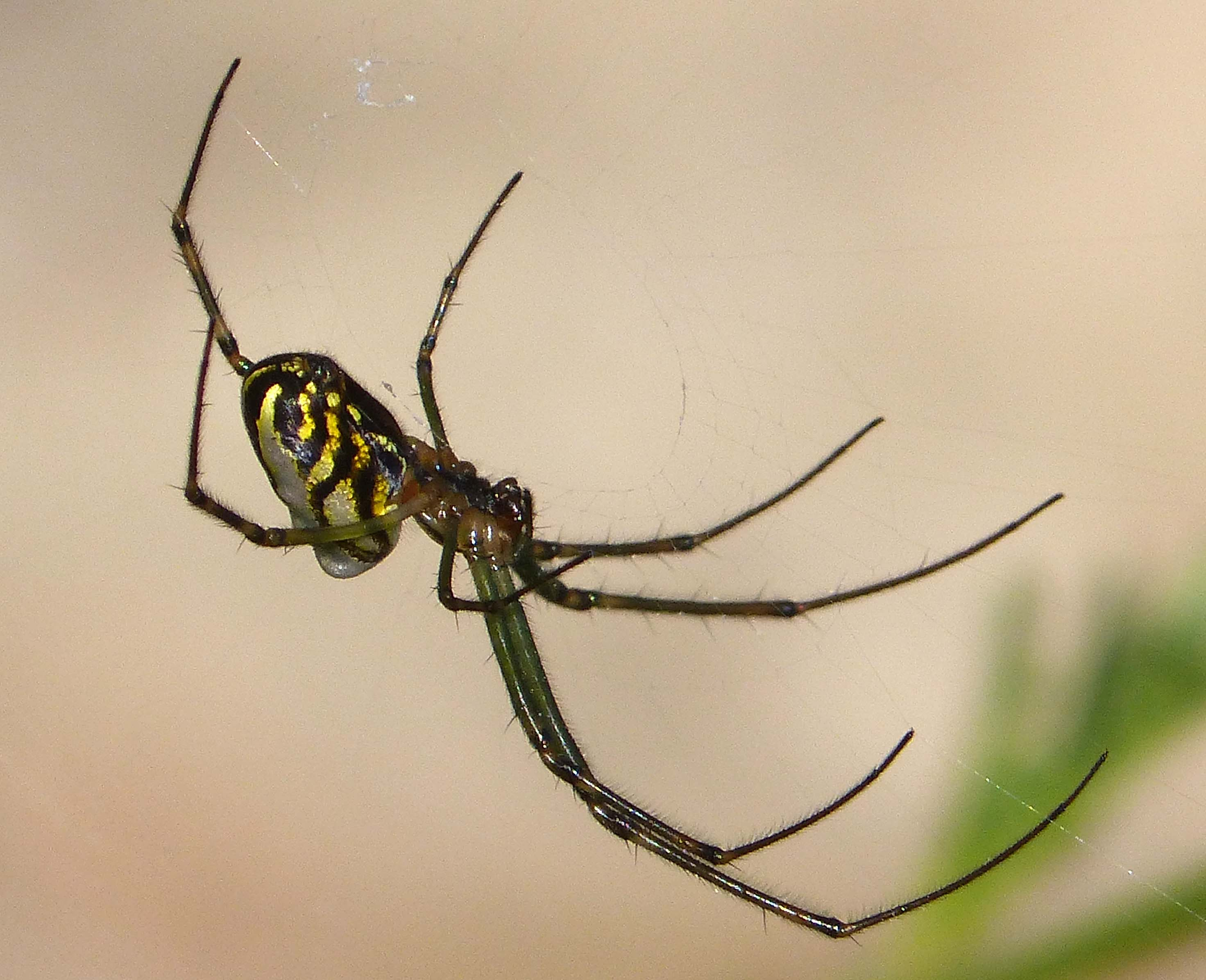

Scientific classification
- Domain: Eukaryota
- Kingdom: Animalia
- Phylum: Arthropoda
- Subphylum: Chelicerata
- Class: Arachnida
- Order: Araneae
- Infraorder: Araneomorphae
- Family: Tetragnathidae
- Genus: Leucauge
- Species: L. granulata

Binomial name
- Leucauge granulata (Walckenaer, 1842)

Synonyms
- Tetragnatha granulata Walckenaer, 1841; Epeira orichalcea Doleschall, 1857; Meta tuberculata Keyserling, 1865; Tetragnatha argentata O. Pickard-Cambridge, 1869; Meta orichalcea (Doleschall, 1857); Meta granulata (Walckenaer, 1841); Argyroepeira granulata (Walckenaer, 1841); Leucauge argentata (O. Pickard-Cambridge, 1869); Leucauge granulata (Walckenaer, 1841); Leucauge bengalensis Gravely, 1921; Leucauge tuberculata (Keyserling, 1865)

= Leucauge granulata =

Species of spider

Leucauge granulata is one of the long-jawed orb weaver spiders (family Tetragnathidae). It is found in India, Sri Lanka, China, the Sunda Islands (Indonesia), Australia, and French Polynesia. Leucauge granulata marginata is known to inhabit New Guinea. Leucauge granulata rimitara in French Polynesia.

A medium-sized spider, with a leg span around 45 mm long (female). Male to 15 mm. The humped shaped abdomen is silver, the head silver green with black. Legs are thin, brown to light green. The web is horizontal or slightly inclined, the spider rests upside down under the web, waiting for prey. Fangs oppose, and work in a pinching manner.
