= List of marine molluscs of New Zealand =

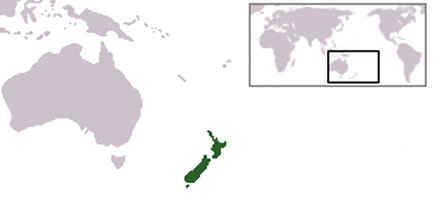
Location of New Zealand

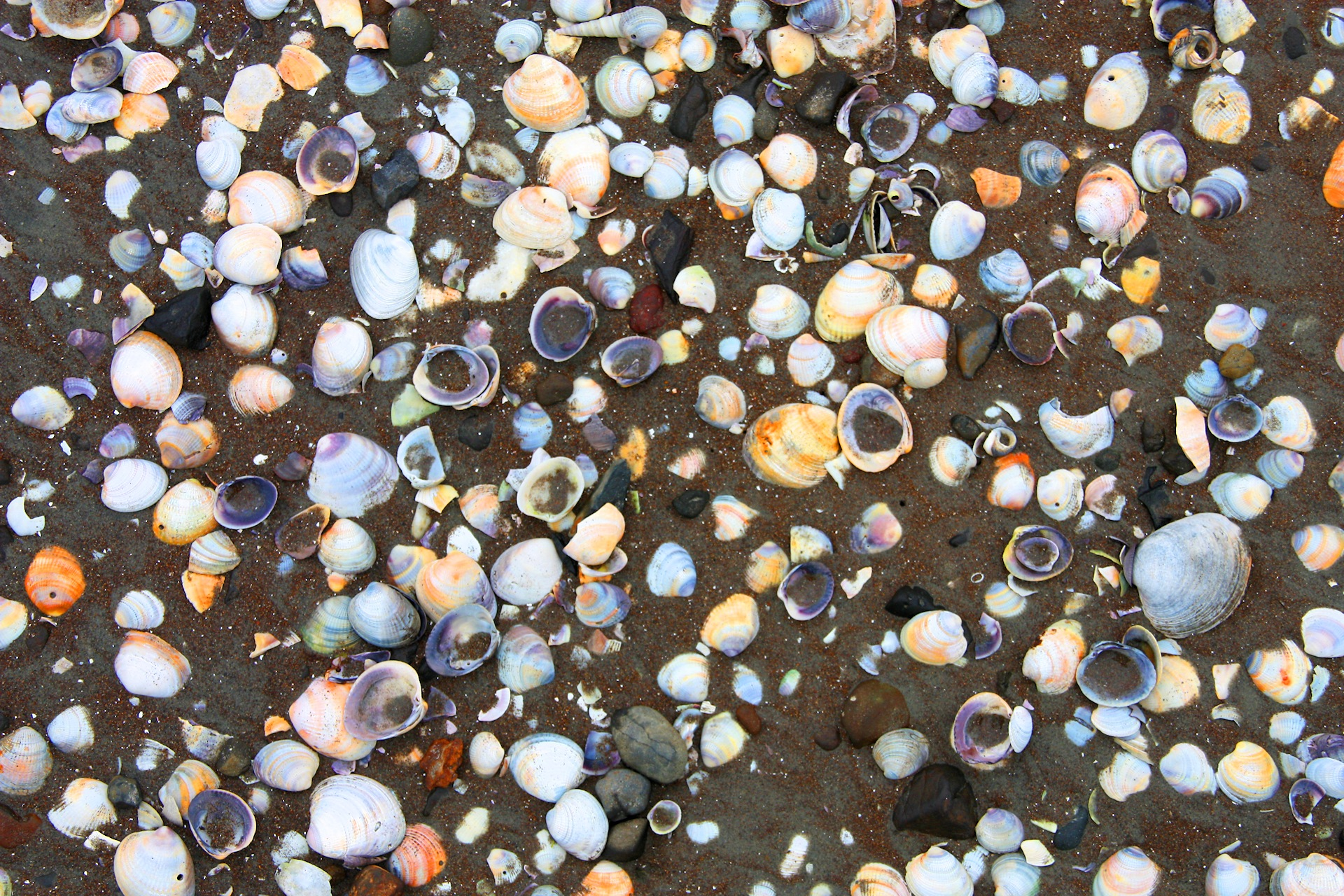
Diversity of marine mollusc shells at Akaroa Beach, New Zealand

This is a list of the marine molluscs of the country of New Zealand, which are a part of the molluscan fauna of New Zealand, which is a part of the biodiversity of New Zealand.

Marine molluscs include marine gastropods (sea snails and sea slugs), bivalves (such as pipis, cockles, oysters, mussels, scallops), octopuses, squid and other classes of Mollusca. This list does not include the land and freshwater species.

== Aplacophora ==
- Proneomenia quincarinata

== Polyplacophora ==
Acanthochitonidae

- Acanthochitona thileniusi
- Acanthochitona zelandica
- Craspedochiton rubiginosus
- Cryptoconchus porosus
- Notoplax aupouria
- Notoplax cuneata
- Notoplax facilis
- Notoplax latalamina
- Notoplax mariae
- Notoplax violacea
- Notoplax websteri

Mopaliidae

- Aerilamma murdochi
- Diaphoroplax biramosus
- Frembleya egregia
- Guildingia obtecta
- Maorichiton caelatus
- Maorichiton schauinslandi
- Plaxiphora australis

Callochitonidae

- Callochiton crocinus
- Callochiton empleurus
- Callochiton kapitiensis
- Callochiton mortenseni

Chitonidae

- Chiton glaucus
- Onithochiton marmoratus
- Onithochiton neglectus
- Rhyssoplax aerea
- Rhyssoplax canaliculata
- Rhyssoplax chathamensis
- Rhyssoplax clavata
- Rhyssoplax stangeri
- Rhyssoplax suteri
- Sypharochiton pelliserpentis
- Sypharochiton sinclairi
- Sypharochiton torri

Callochitonidae

- Eudoxochiton nobilis

Ischnochitonidae

- Ischnochiton circumvallatus
- Ischnochiton granulifer
- Ischnochiton luteoroseus
- Ischnochiton maorianus

Leptochitonidae

- Lepidopleurus finlayi
- Lepidopleurus inquinatus
- Lepidopleurus otagoensis

Loricidae

- Lorica haurakiensis

== Gastropoda ==
Nacellidae

- Cellana radians – golden limpet

Fissurellidae (keyhole limpets and slit limpets)

- Cornisepta festiva
- Monodilepas diemenensis
- Monodilepas otagoensis
- Scutus breviculus Blainville, 1817

Haliotidae

- Haliotis iris – paua

Calliostomatidae

- Calliostoma selectum – select maurea
- Selastele onustum

Trochidae (top snails)

- Diloma subrostrata – mudflat top shell
- Fossarina rimata
- Herpetopoma alacerrimum
- Herpetopoma bellum
- Herpetopoma benthicola
- Herpetopoma larochei
- Herpetopoma mariae
- Homalopoma crassicostata
- Homalopoma fluctuata
- Homalopoma imperforata
- Homalopoma micans
- Homalopoma nana
- Homalopoma rotella
- Homalopoma umbilicata
- Homalopoma variecostata

Turbinidae

- Astraea heliotropium – circular saw shell
- Cookia sulcata – Cook's turban
- Lunella smaragda – cat's eye

Neritidae

- Nerita melanotragus – black nerite

Batillariidae

- Zeacumantus lutulentus – koeti (a horn shell)

Turritellidae

- Maoricolpus roseus

Littorinidae (periwinkles)

- Austrolittorina antipodum – banded periwinkle

Rissoidae

- Alvania gallinacea
- Alvania gradatoides

Struthiolariidae

- Struthiolaria papulosa – ostrich foot

Ranellidae

- Charonia tritonis – giant triton
- Fusitriton retiolus
- Monoplex parthenopeus – giant triton
- Ranella olearium (Linnaeus, 1758) – wandering triton

Hipponicidae (hoof snails)

- Hipponix conicus wyattae

Buccinidae (whelks)

- Cominella glandiformis – mud whelk

Muricidae

- Poirieria zelandica – spiny murex

Volutidae

- Alcithoe arabica – Arabic volute
- Iredalina mirabilis – golden volute

Olividae

- Amalda australis – southern olive

Epitoniidae (wentletraps)

- Funiscala maxwelli
- Murdochella alacer

Janthinidae

- Janthina janthina – violet snail

Okadaiidae

- Vayssierea cinnabarea

Facelinidae

- Babakina caprinsulensis

Bullidae

- Bulla quoyii – brown bubble snail

Siphonariidae

- Benhamina obliquata

Amphibolidae

- Amphibola crenata – mud-flat snail

Onchidiidae

- Onchidella nigricans

== Bivalvia ==
Mesodesmatidae

- Paphies australis – pipi
- Paphies subtriangulata – tuatua
- Paphies ventricosa – toheroa

Tellinidae

- Macomona liliana – large wedge shell

Veneridae

- Austrovenus stutchburyi – New Zealand cockle
- Dosinia anus – ringed dosinia

Ostreidae

- Saccostrea cucullata – rock oyster
- Tiostrea chilensis – Bluff oyster

Pectinidae

- Pecten novaezelandiae – New Zealand scallop
- Talochlamys zelandiae – New Zealand fan shell

Mytilidae

- Gigantidas gladius
- Mytilus edulis – blue mussel
- Perna canaliculus – New Zealand green-lipped mussel

Pinnidae

- Atrina zelandica – horse mussel

== Scaphopoda ==
Gadilidae

- Cadulus colubridens
- Cadulus delicatulus
- Cadulus teliger

Dentaliidae

- Dentalium diarrhox
- Dentalium ecostatum
- Dentalium glaucarena
- Dentalium nanum
- Dentalium suteri
- Dentalium tiwhana
- Dentalium zelandicum

== Cephalopoda ==
Spirulidae

- Spirula spirula – ram's horn squid

Sepiadariidae

- Sepioloidea pacifica – Pacific bobtail squid

Sepiolidae

- Iridoteuthis maoria

Cranchiidae

- Mesonychoteuthis hamiltoni – colossal squid

Histioteuthidae

- Histioteuthis reversa – reverse jewel squid

Octopodidae

- Pinnoctopus cordiformis – common New Zealand octopus

Argonautidae

- Argonauta nodosa – knobby argonaut

== See also ==
- List of non-marine molluscs of New Zealand
- List of marine molluscs of Australia
