= Vayssierea caledonica =

Scientific classification
- Kingdom: Animalia
- Phylum: Mollusca
- Class: Gastropoda
- Order: Nudibranchia
- Family: Okadaiidae
- Genus: Vayssierea
- Species: V. caledonica

Binomial name
- Vayssierea caledonica (Risbec, 1928)

Species of gastropod

Vayssierea caledonica is a species of sea slug, a dorid nudibranch in the gastropod family Okadaiidae. It is considered a close relative of all the species in the Vayssierea genus (V. caledonica, V. felis, V. cinnabarea, and V. elegans). That entire genus however is sometimes referred to under one species name, V. felis.

== Description ==
When full grown this red-orange nudibranch is about 1–2.5 mm (0.04–0.10 in) in size. They lack external gills and also have primitive rhinophores. This species reproduces by direct development and can lay over ten eggs. These eggs take about 29 days to hatch.

== Range ==
V. caledonica is found in the waters off New Caledonia and also Australia, specifically in the New South Wales, Victoria, and Queensland territories.

== Habitat ==
This species can be found in 0–3 metres (0–10 ft) of water. They are usually on rocks associated with the tube worms they eat. They can also be found underneath rocks during low tide or floating on brown algae.

== Ecology ==
This species feeds on Spirorbis or other tube worms. In Victoria it is usually found near its food source, the serpulid polychaete worm Salmacina dysteri.

== Etymology ==
The name for this nudibranch comes from where it was discovered, New Caledonia.

== Taxonomy ==
This nudibranch was first named by Jean Risbec in 1928. Although Vayssierea caledonica is accepted as a species by many individuals, there are some that argue that all Veyssierea should be under one species name, V. felis. Risbec described this nudibranch as differing in radula morphology from other Veyssierea by having two lateral teeth instead of three. Individuals argue that viewing these small specimens under a light microscope can be misleading.
