= A. nobilis =

A. nobilis may refer to:

- Achillea nobilis, the noble yarrow, a flowering plant species
- Amherstia nobilis, the pride of Burma, a tropical tree species with exceptionally beautiful flowers
- Anthemis nobilis, the Roman Camomile, Chamomile, garden camomile, ground apple, low chamomile, English chamomile or whig plant, a low perennial plant species found in dry fields and around gardens and cultivated grounds
- Artocarpus nobilis, a plant species endemic to Sri Lanka
- Atractoscion nobilis, the white seabass, a croaker species occurring from Magdalena Bay, Baja California, to Juneau, Alaska

== Synonyms ==
- Ara nobilis, a synonym for Diopsittaca nobilis, the red-shouldered macaw, a small parrot species
- Acanthopleura nobilis, a synonym for Eudoxochiton nobilis, a chiton species

== See also ==
- Nobilis (disambiguation)
