= Annaperenna verrucosa =

Scientific classification
- Kingdom: Animalia
- Phylum: Mollusca
- Class: Gastropoda
- Subclass: Caenogastropoda
- Order: Littorinimorpha
- Family: Bursidae
- Genus: Annaperenna
- Species: A. verrucosa

Binomial name
- Annaperenna verrucosa (G. B. Sowerby I, 1825)

Synonyms
- Bursa verrucosa (G.B. Sowerby I, 1825); Murex papilla Wood, 1828; Ranella verrucosa (G.B. Sowerby I, 1825)

Species of gastropod

Annaperenna verrucosa, common name the warty ranella, is a species of large sea snail, a marine gastropod mollusc in the family Bursidae, known as the frog shells.

== Description ==
Shell size 33 mm.

== Distribution ==
This species is found in portions of Australia, New Zealand, and the Kermadec Islands, in moderate water depths.
