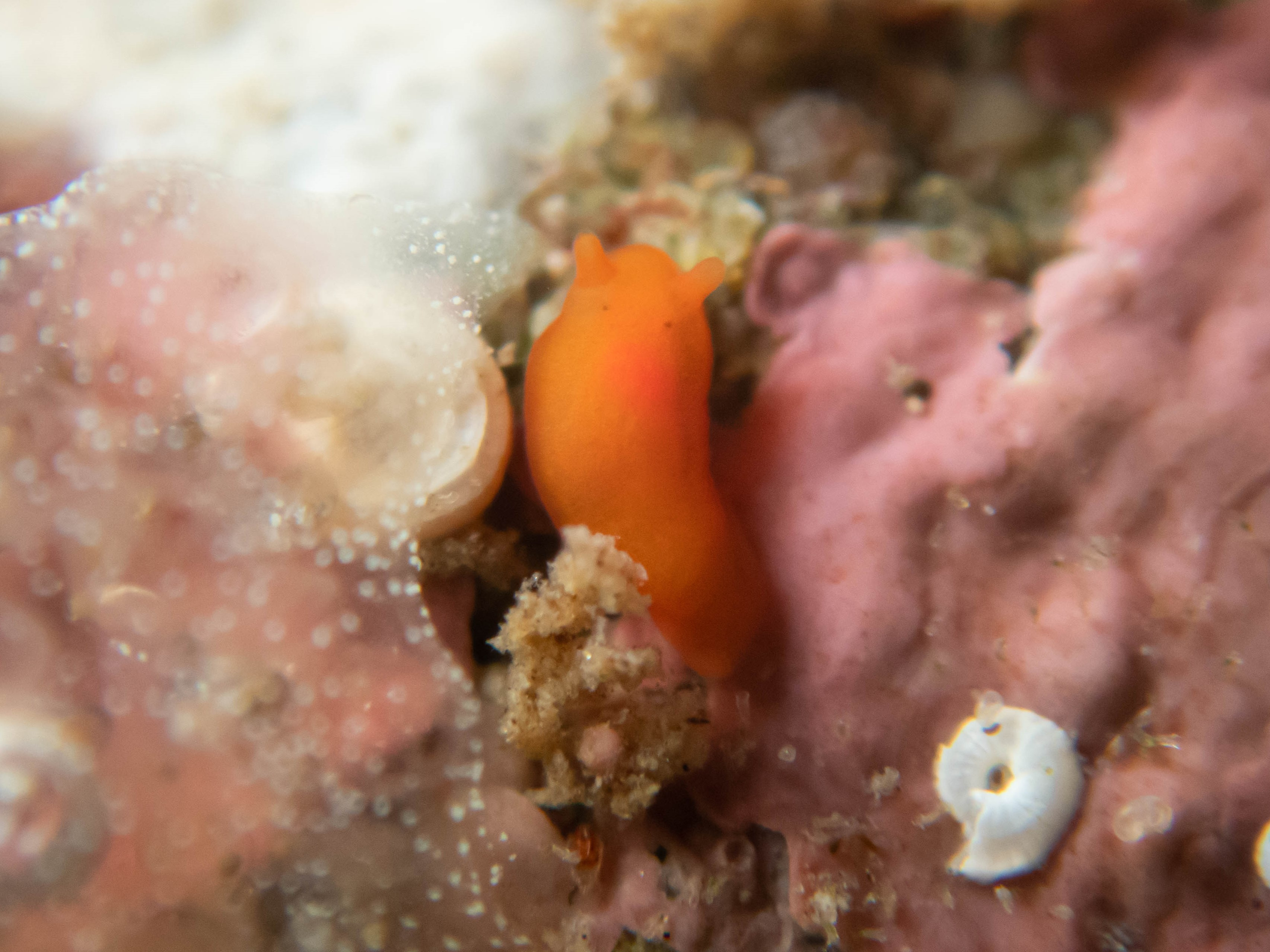
- Vayssierea cinnabarea

Scientific classification
- Kingdom: Animalia
- Phylum: Mollusca
- Class: Gastropoda
- Order: Nudibranchia
- Family: Okadaiidae
- Genus: Vayssierea; Baba, 1930
- Species: V. cinnabarea

Binomial name
- Vayssierea cinnabarea (Ralph, 1944)

Synonyms
- Okadaia cinnabarea (Ralph, 1944); Pellibranchus cinnabareus Ralph, 1944

= Vayssierea cinnabarea =

Species of gastropod

Vayssierea cinnabarea is a species of small sea slug, a dorid nudibranch in the gastropod family Okadaiidae.

== Range ==
This species occurs in New Zealand.

== Ecology ==
This species feeds on Spirorbis tube worms.

== Taxonomy ==
Although Vayssierea cinnabarea is accepted as a separate species by many individuals, there are some that argue that all Veyssierea should be under one species name, V. felis.
