= Blue periwinkle =

Blue periwinkle refers to:

- Austrolittorina unifasciata, a sea-snail of Australasia and the South Pacific
- Vinca major, a flowering plant native to the Western Mediterranean
