= H. nana =

H. nana may refer to:

- Hasemania nana, the silvertip tetra, a freshwater fish species native to blackwater rivers in Brazil
- Hemigrammocapoeta nana, a ray-finned fish species found in Israel, Jordan and Syria
- Homalopoma nana, a minute sea snail species
- Hoplocorypha nana, a praying mantis species found in Uganda and Zululand
- Hulsea nana, the dwarf alpinegold, a flowering plant species
- Hydnocarpus nana, a plant species endemic to Malaysia
- Hymenolepis nana, the dwarf tapeworm, a worm species

== Synonyms ==
- Harmodia nana, a synonym for Hadena confusa, a moth species

== See also ==
- Nana (disambiguation)
