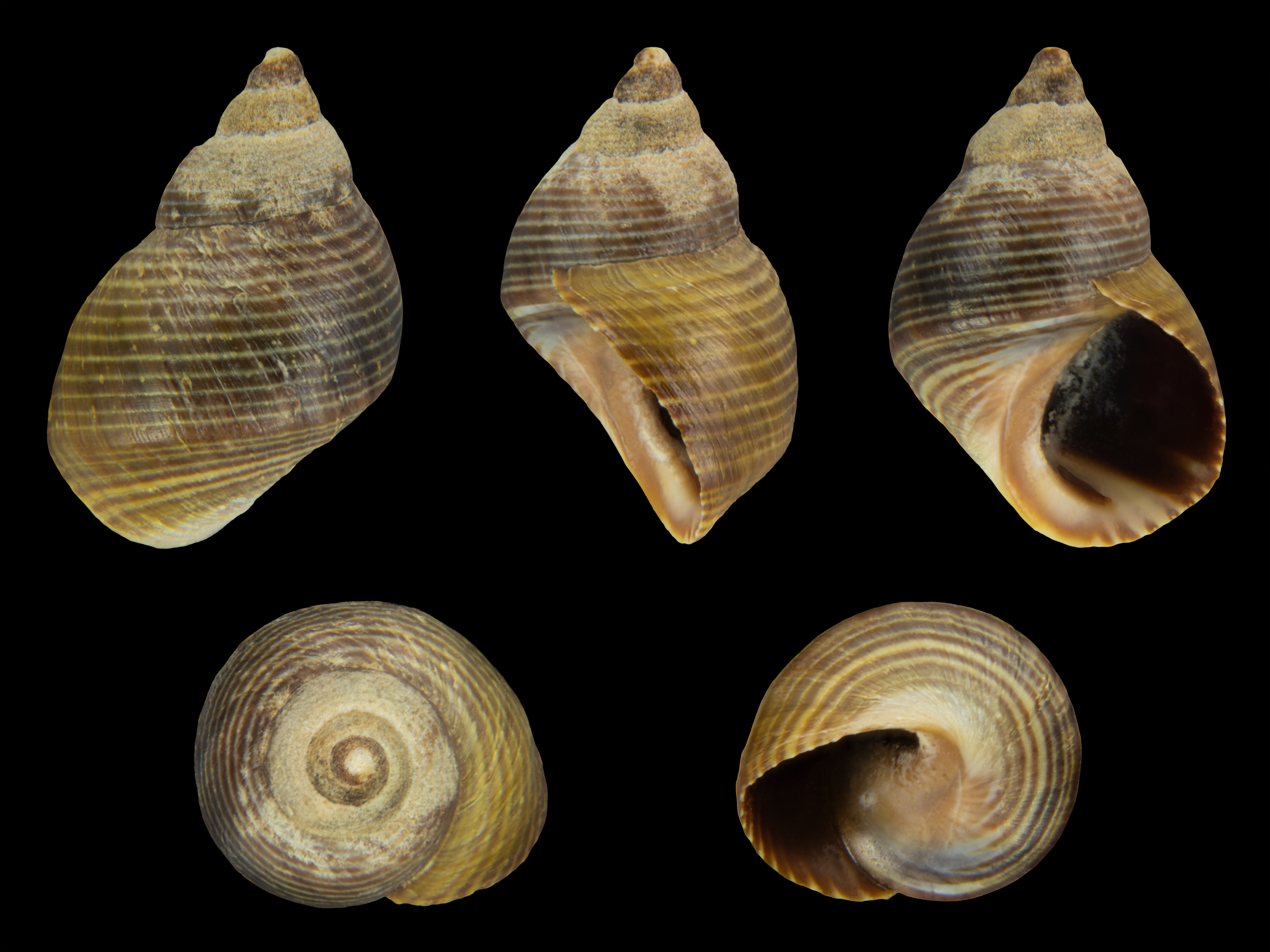

Scientific classification
- Kingdom: Animalia
- Phylum: Mollusca
- Class: Gastropoda
- Subclass: Caenogastropoda
- Order: Littorinimorpha
- Family: Littorinidae
- Genus: Austrolittorina
- Species: A. cincta

Binomial name
- Austrolittorina cincta (Quoy & Gaimard, 1833)

Synonyms
- Echinolittorina cincta (Quoy & Gaimard, 1833); Littorina cincta Quoy & Gaimard, 1833; Littorina luctuosa Reeve, 1857; Melarhaphe zelandiae Finlay, 1927

= Austrolittorina cincta =

Species of gastropod

Austrolittorina cincta is a species of sea snail, a marine gastropod mollusk in the family Littorinidae, the winkles or periwinkles, found in and endemic to New Zealand.

Commonly called the brown periwinkle, or ngaeti in the Māori language.

== Description ==
Size up to 15mm in length.

(Described as Melarhaphe zelandiae)The shell is closely related to Austrolittorina unifasciata (Gray, 1826), but it is distinguished by having shorter and less convex whorls that are not as inflated. It is much darker in color, appearing uniformly blackish on the exterior and grayish-brown where the surface has been corroded; the inner part of the base is sometimes whitish. The interior is a rich, dark chocolate-brown, marked by a distinct white band below.

The spiral sculpture is much better defined than in the Australian shells, particularly on the base, where the interstices are not linear and are rendered prominent by their white coloration. Additionally, the peripheral subangulation is more clearly marked.

== Distribution ==
Although present in all parts of New Zealand, it is more common in the south.
