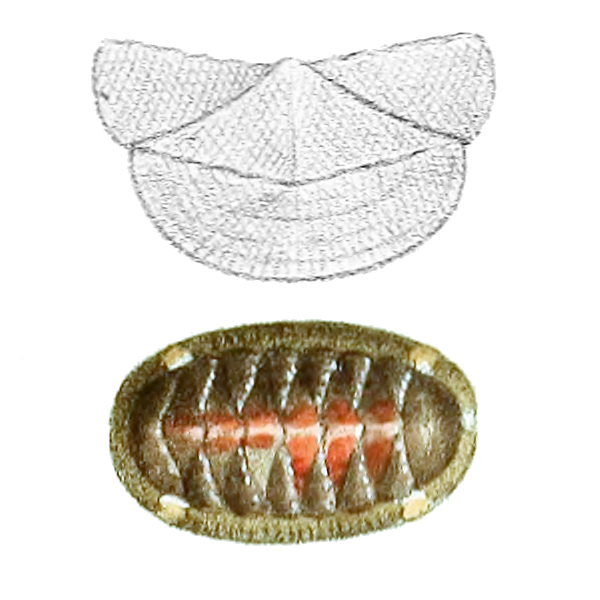
- Callochiton crocinus

Scientific classification
- Kingdom: Animalia
- Phylum: Mollusca
- Class: Polyplacophora
- Order: Chitonida
- Family: Ischnochitonidae
- Subfamily: Callochitoninae
- Genus: Callochiton; Gray, 1847

Type species
- Chiton laevis Pennant, 1777 sensu Montagu, 1803

Species
- See text

Synonyms
- Acutoplax Cotton & Weeding, 1939 ·; Callochiton (Callochiton) Gray, 1847 · alternate representation; Callochiton (Icoplax) Thiele, 1893; Callochiton (Ocellochiton) Ashby, 1939; Callochiton (Stereochiton) Carpenter [in Dall], 1882; Callochiton (Trachyradsia) Carpenter, 1878; Chiton (Callochiton) Gray, 1847; Icoplax Thiele, 1893; Ischnochiton (Trachyradsia) Carpenter, 1878; Ocellochiton Ashby, 1939; Paricoplax Iredale & Hull, 1929 ·; Stereochiton Carpenter in Dall, 1882

= Callochiton =

Callochiton Temporal range: Oligocene–Recent

Genus of molluscs

Callochiton is a genus of chitons in the family Callochitonidae.

== Species ==
- Callochiton crocinus (Reeve, 1847)
- Callochiton dentatus Spengler, 1797
- Callochiton empleurus (Hutton, 1872)
- Callochiton kapitiensis Mestayer, 1926
- Callochiton mortenseni Odhner, 1924
- Callochiton puniceus (Gould, 1846)
- Callochiton septemvalvis (Montagu, 1803)
- Callochiton subeudoxa (Iredale and Hull, 1930
- Callochiton sulculatus Suter, 1907
