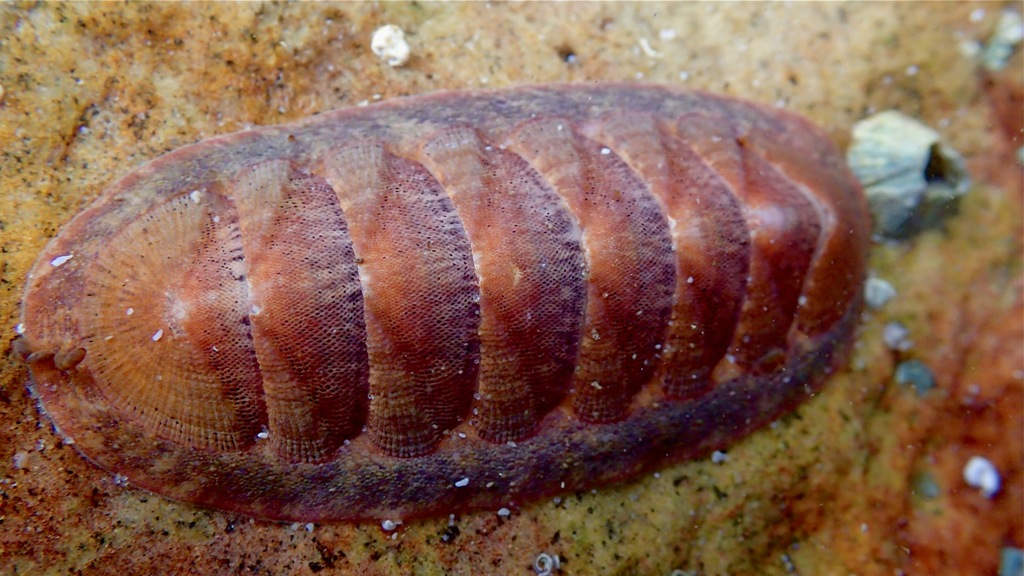

Scientific classification
- Kingdom: Animalia
- Phylum: Mollusca
- Class: Polyplacophora
- Order: Chitonida
- Family: Ischnochitonidae
- Genus: Callochiton
- Species: C. dentatus

Binomial name
- Callochiton dentatus Spengler, 1797

Synonyms
- Chiton dentatus Spengler, 1797; Callochiton castaneus (Wood, 1815); Chiton fulgetrum Reeve, 1847

= Callochiton dentatus =

Species of mollusc

Callochiton dentatus, the broad chiton, is a medium to large-sized polyplacophoran mollusc in the family Callochitonidae, found on the coast of southern Africa.

== Description ==
This is a very flat and broad chiton with valves that are dark brown to orange, shiny and finely granulated. The wide girdle is densely covered with very small, elongate scales that produce a velvet-like texture. The margin of each valve contains a diagnostic slit that is visible if the girdle is pulled away. The species reaches a size of 20–50 mm.

== Distribution and habitat ==
Callochiton dentatus occurs along the south coast of Africa, from Namibia to the south coast of KwaZulu-Natal in South Africa. It is uncommon and can usually be found as solitary individuals under rocks near the low tide mark. The original description by Lorenz Spengler recorded it at the Cape of Good Hope.
