= Homalopoma nana =

Scientific classification
- Kingdom: Animalia
- Phylum: Mollusca
- Class: Gastropoda
- Subclass: Vetigastropoda
- Order: Trochida
- Family: Colloniidae
- Genus: Homalopoma
- Species: H. nana

Binomial name
- Homalopoma nana (Finlay, 1930)

Synonyms
- Argalista nana Finlay, 1930

Species of gastropod

Homalopoma nana is a species of a minute sea snail, a marine gastropod mollusc in the family Colloniidae.

== Distribution ==
This species occurs in New Zealand.

== Original description ==
Homalopoma nana was originally discovered and described as Argalista nana by Harold John Finlay in 1930. Finlay's original text (the type description) reads as follows:

Argalista nana n. sp.

Very similar to fluctuata in general appearance, but uniformly smaller when adult. Spiral grooves same in arrangement, but considerably finer. A rather wide band round the umbilicus is free from spiral grooves in fluctuata; in nana this band is much narrower, spirals continuing almost up to perforation. Perhaps the best distinguishing character is the umbilicus, which in nana, is much smaller and almost filled up, appearing much as in Uberella vitrea (Hutton). Colour pattern much the same as in fluctuata.

Height, 9 mm.; width, 2.5 mm.

Locality—12 fathoms [22 m], Awanui Bay, type and several others; also 6 fathoms [11 m], Doubtless Bay, several; 25 fathoms [46 m], Hen and Chickens, one, and 38 fathoms [69 m], Cuvier Island, one.

Type in Finlay collection.

I have one typical specimen of fluctuata from 38 fathoms [69 m], Cuvier Island, otherwise all my shells of this species are from southern localities. Nana may be the northern representative of fluctuata, but the occurrence of both forms together off Cuvier Island seems to negative this. Nana is somewhat the size of Cirsonella densilirata Suter (a species very easily confused with the young of Argalista), but is much more tightly coiled, and has the typical Argalista pad, etc..
