= Cookia kawauensis =

Scientific classification
- Kingdom: Animalia
- Phylum: Mollusca
- Class: Gastropoda
- Subclass: Vetigastropoda
- Order: Trochida
- Superfamily: Trochoidea
- Family: Turbinidae
- Genus: Cookia
- Species: †C. kawauensis

Binomial name
- †Cookia kawauensis Powell, 1938

Extinct species of gastropod

Cookia kawauensis is an extinct species of sea snail, a marine gastropod mollusk, in the family Turbinidae, the turban snails.

== Distribution ==
This species occurs in New Zealand.
