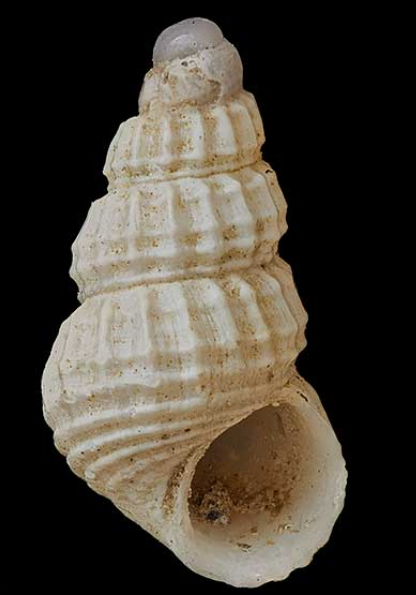
- Shell of Alvania gradatoides (specimen at the Auckland Museum)

Scientific classification
- Domain: Eukaryota
- Kingdom: Animalia
- Phylum: Mollusca
- Class: Gastropoda
- Subclass: Caenogastropoda
- Order: Littorinimorpha
- Superfamily: Rissooidea
- Family: Rissoidae
- Genus: Alvania
- Species: A. gradatoides

Binomial name
- Alvania gradatoides (Finlay, 1930)

Synonyms
- Alvania (Linemera) gradatoides (H. J. Finlay, 1930) alternate representation; Alvinia (Linemera) gradatoides (Finlay, 1930); Linemera gradatoides Finlay, 1930

= Alvania gradatoides =

Species of gastropod

Alvania gradatoides is a species of small sea snail with an operculum, a marine gastropod mollusk in the family Rissoidae.

== Distribution ==
- New Zealand (off Oamaru)
- Tasmania

== Description ==
The length of the shell attains 3 mm, its diameter 1.6 mm.

Alvania gradatoides was originally discovered and described as Linemera gradatoides by Harold John Finlay in 1930.
