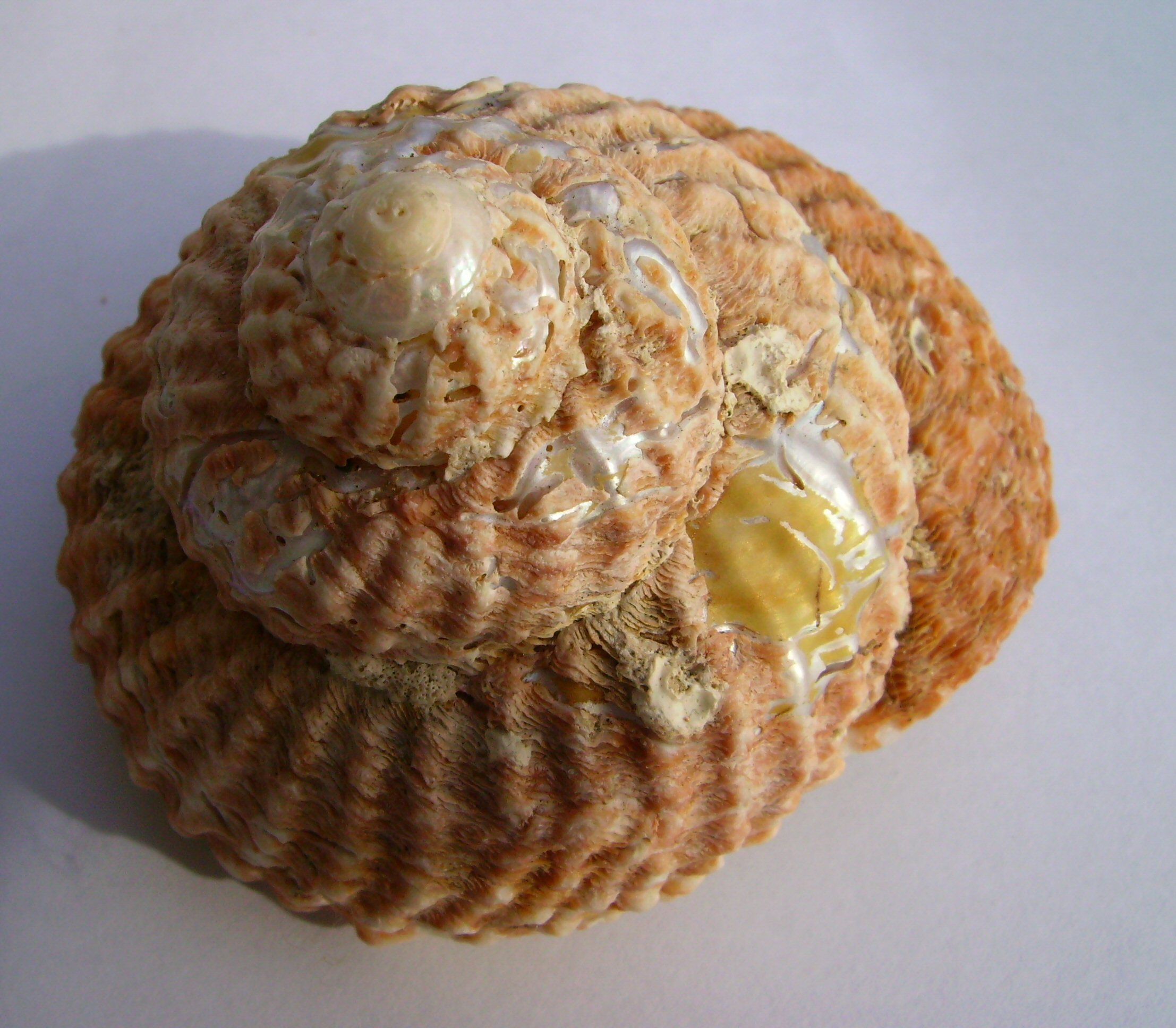
- Cookia sulcata

Scientific classification
- Kingdom: Animalia
- Phylum: Mollusca
- Class: Gastropoda
- Subclass: Vetigastropoda
- Order: Trochida
- Superfamily: Trochoidea
- Family: Turbinidae
- Genus: Cookia; Lesson, 1832

Type species
- Cookia novaezelandiae Lesson, 1832

= Cookia =

Genus of gastropods

Cookia is a genus of large sea snails, marine gastropod molluscs in the family Turbinidae, the turban snails.

Cookia is sometimes treated as a subgenus of the genus Bolma.

The genus was named after Captain James Cook.

== Species ==
Species within the genus Cookia include:

- †Cookia kawauensis Powell, 1938
- Cookia sulcata (Lightfoot, 1786)

Species brought into synonymy

- Cookia novaezelandiae Lesson, 1832: synonym of Cookia sulcata (Lightfoot, 1786)
