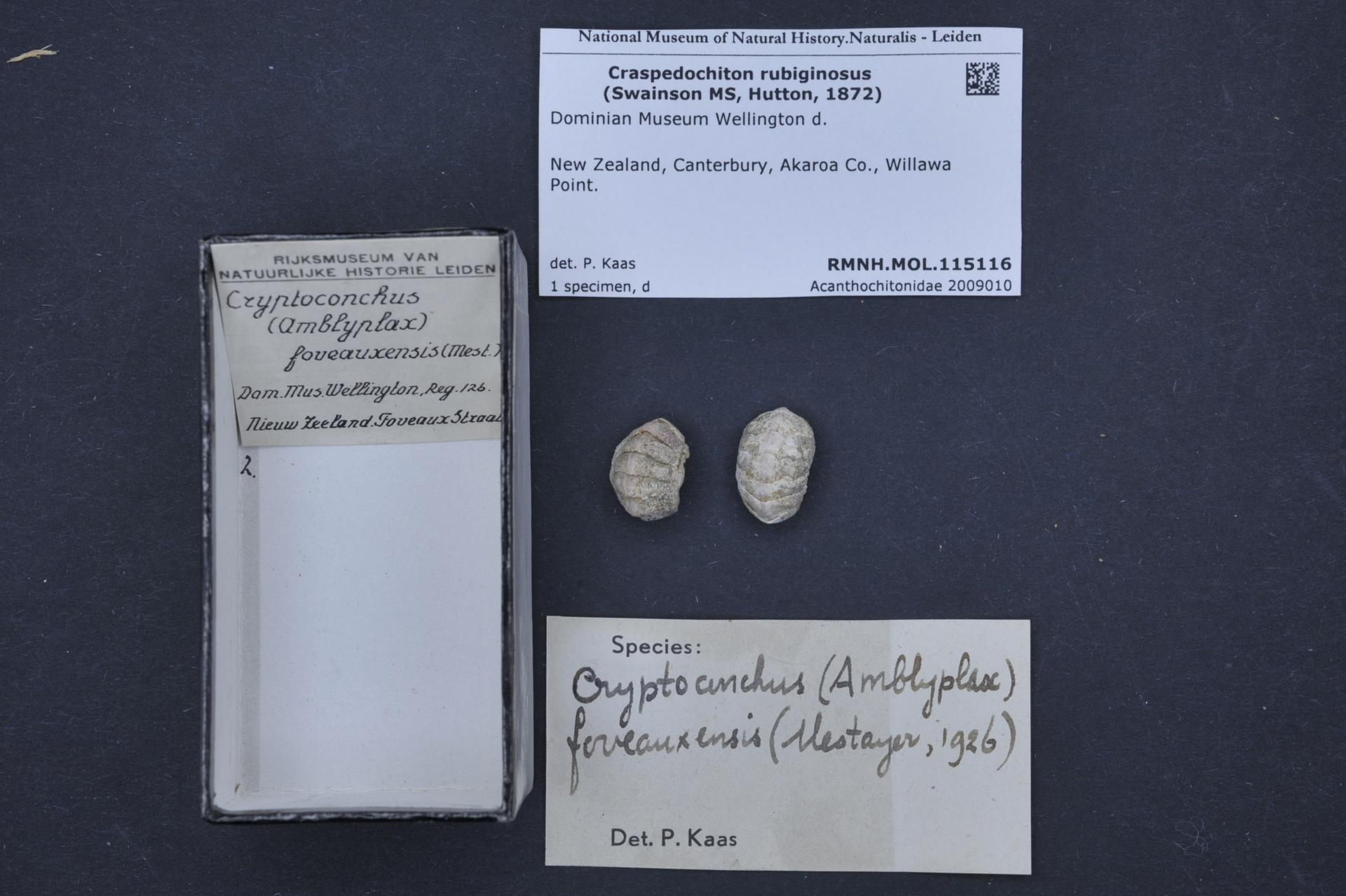
- Specimen of preserved N. rubiginosa, labelled using a synonymous name

Scientific classification
- Domain: Eukaryota
- Kingdom: Animalia
- Phylum: Mollusca
- Class: Polyplacophora
- Order: Chitonida
- Family: Acanthochitonidae
- Genus: Notoplax
- Species: N. rubiginosa

Binomial name
- Notoplax rubiginosa (Hutton, 1872)

Synonyms
- Acanthochiton foveauxensis Mestayer, 1926; Acanthochiton foveauxensis var. kirki Mestayer, 1926; Chiton rubiginosus Hutton, 1872; Craspedochiton rubiginosus (Hutton, 1872); Lophoplax finlayi Ashby, 1926; Macandrellus oliveri Mestayer, 1926; Notoplax (Amblyplax) foveauxensis Ashby, 1926; Notoplax (Amblyplax) oliveri Ashby, 1926; Tonicia rubiginosa Hutton, 1872

= Notoplax rubiginosa =

Species of chiton in the family Acanthochitonidae, native to New Zealand

Notoplax rubiginosa is a species of chiton in the family Acanthochitonidae, native to New Zealand. The species grows to 18 millimetres (0.71 in) long and 10 millimetres (0.39 in) wide. N. rubiginosa is known as the most common chiton from the Plio-Pleistocene in fossil records of New Zealand.
