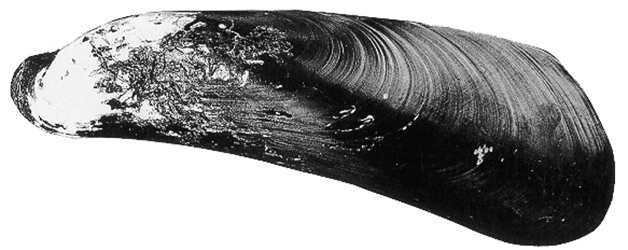
- Gigantidas tangaroa

Scientific classification
- Kingdom: Animalia
- Phylum: Mollusca
- Class: Bivalvia
- Order: Mytilida
- Family: Mytilidae
- Genus: Gigantidas; Cosel & B. A. Marshall, 2003

Species
- See text

= Gigantidas =

Genus of bivalves

Gigantidas is a genus of large, deepwater, hydrothermal vent mussels, marine bivalve molluscs in the family Mytilidae.

== Distribution and habitat ==
Species in this genus are found on deep-sea hydrothermal vents on the southern Kermadec Ridge. These mussels form dense beds at these sites.

== Description ==
The shells of Gigantidas gladius are up to 30 cm long.

== Species ==
Species within the genus Gigantidas include:

- Gigantidas childressi Gustafson, R. D. Turner, Lutz & Vrijenhoek, 1998
- Gigantidas coseli Saether, Little, Campbell, Marshall, Collins & Alfaro, 2010
- Gigantidas gladius Cosel & Marshall, 2003
- Gigantidas haimaensis T. Xu, D. Feng, J. Tao & J.-W. Qiu, 2019
- Gigantidas horikoshii Hashimoto & Yamane, 2005
- Gigantidas mauritanicus Cosel, 2002
- Gigantidas niobengalensis P. G. Oliver, Gonsalves, Samuel & Garzia, 2024
- Gigantidas platifrons J. Hashimoto & Okutani, 1994
- Gigantidas samario Cosel & Gracia, 2018
- Gigantidas taiwanensis Cosel, 2008
- Gigantidas tangaroa Cosel & B. A. Marshall, 2003
- Gigantidas vrijenhoeki S.-J. Jang, P.-T. Ho, S.-Y. Jun, D. Kim & Y.-J. Won, 2020
