= Dentalium zelandicum =

Scientific classification
- Kingdom: Animalia
- Phylum: Mollusca
- Class: Scaphopoda
- Order: Dentaliida
- Family: Dentaliidae
- Genus: Dentalium
- Species: D. zelandicum

Binomial name
- Dentalium zelandicum Sowerby II, 1860

Species of mollusc

Dentalium zelandicum is a species of tusk shell, a marine scaphopod mollusk in the family Dentaliidae.

This species is endemic to New Zealand waters.
