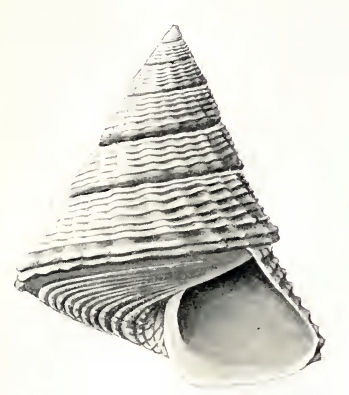
- Original image of a shell of Selastele retiarium

Scientific classification
- Kingdom: Animalia
- Phylum: Mollusca
- Class: Gastropoda
- Subclass: Vetigastropoda
- Order: Trochida
- Family: Calliostomatidae
- Genus: Selastele
- Species: S. retiarium

Binomial name
- Selastele retiarium (Hedley & May, 1908)

Synonyms
- Calliostoma retiarium Hedley & May, 1908 (original description)

= Selastele retiarium =

Species of gastropod

Selastele retiarium, common name the netted top shell, is a species of sea snail, a marine gastropod mollusc in the family Calliostomatidae.

== Description ==
(Original description by Hedley & May) The height of the shell attains 7 mm. The small, subperforate shell has a conical shape with sharply keeled periphery, overlapping spire whorls and a flat base. Its colour and number of whorls are uncertain, the latter exceeding six.

Sculpture: small spiral threads parted by wider interstices amount to seven on the penultimate, and to twenty on the body whorl. Of these a double row compose the peripheral keel. On either side of the keel the interstices are wider than usual. The radials are irregular oblique wave-like folds, twenty-two on the body whorl, which raise beads on the keel rows, and there cease abruptly. On the base incipient radials bead the inner spirals.

The oblique aperture is trapezoidal. The simple outer lip is sharply angled by the periphery. The columella insertion is a little reflected over the minute umbilicus.

== Distribution ==
This marine species occurs off South Australia, Victoria and Tasmania at depths between 170 m and 180 m.
