= Callochiton empleurus =

Scientific classification
- Kingdom: Animalia
- Phylum: Mollusca
- Class: Polyplacophora
- Order: Chitonida
- Family: Ischnochitonidae
- Genus: Callochiton
- Species: C. empleurus

Binomial name
- Callochiton empleurus (Hutton, 1872)

Synonyms
- Chiton empleurus Hutton, 1872

Species of mollusc

Callochiton empleurus is a species of chiton in the family Callochitonidae.
