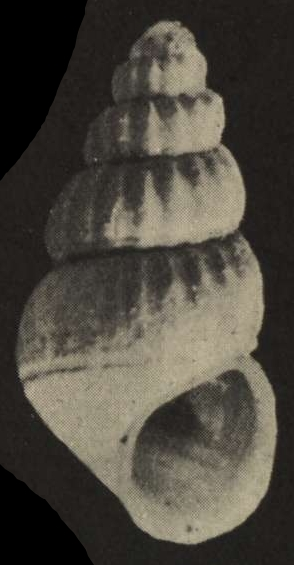
- Black-and-white photo of apertural view of the paratype of Alvania gallinacea from Poor Knights Islands

Scientific classification
- Kingdom: Animalia
- Phylum: Mollusca
- Class: Gastropoda
- Subclass: Caenogastropoda
- Order: Littorinimorpha
- Superfamily: Rissooidea
- Family: Rissoidae
- Genus: Alvania
- Species: A. gallinacea

Binomial name
- Alvania gallinacea (Finlay, 1930)

Synonyms
- Alvania (Linemera) gallinacea (H. J. Finlay, 1930) · alternate representation; Alvinia (Linemera) gallinacea (Finlay, 1930); Linemera gallinacea Finlay, 1930

= Alvania gallinacea =

Species of gastropod

Alvania gallinacea is a species of small sea snail with an operculum, a marine gastropod mollusk or micromollusk in the family Rissoidae.

== Distribution ==
- This marine species is endemic to New Zealand and occurs off Northland offshore Islands.

== Original description ==
Alvania gallinacea was originally discovered and described as Linemera gallinacea by Harold John Finlay in 1930. Finlay's original text (the type description) reads as follows:

Linemera gallinacea n. sp. (Fig. 41).

Shell fairly large for the genus, tall, fairly wide, with subobsolete spiral sculpture, strong axials, weakening on later whorls, and an almost smooth base. Embryo well developed, of two smooth and rather globose whorls, ending abruptly in a sudden contraction, generally followed almost immediately by the first axial rib. Succeeding whorls 4½, faintly convex; the early ones flat, with a narrow horizontal shoulder and blunt angle almost at the upper suture, fading out on lower whorls, which becomes cut in more at lower suture. Axial ribs on first two whorls strong, wide, and wellspaced (own width or more apart), on subsequent whorls progressively weaker, narrower, and closer (interstices becoming only one half to one-third their own width on penultimate and last whorls), 14 ribs on first whorl, 20 on second, 24 on third, variable and irregularly developed on body whorl. At first no spiral sculpture, then a faint groove on the subangled periphery just above lower suture, on penultimate and body whorls this becomes a well marked groove bordered by two narrow spiral cords, sharply marking off the flatly convex base; the axial ribs stop immediately below second of these cords, and just below that again is sometimes a third weaker spiral cord emerging from suture (generally absent); rest of base practically smooth except for obscure spiral markings indicating indefinite ribs. A distinct umbilical chink is present, over which the pillar is slightly reflexed and is then continued to form a distinctly effuse anterior lip to the suboval inclined aperture, behind which is a weak varix. Peristome continuous, sharp. (Rarely, a fourth spiral cord may appear on body whorl just above the two peripheral threads).

Height, 3.1 mm.; width, 1.6 mm. (type).

Height, 3.7 mm.; width, 1.8 mm. (paratype).

Height, 3.5 mm.; width, 1.7 mm. (Poor Knights paratype).

Locality—25 fathoms, off Hen and Chicken Islands, type and many others; also from 35 fathoms, Colville Channel (sent to me by Odhner as "Aclis semireticulata Suter," vide Finlay, Trans. N.Z. Inst., vol. 57, p. 404, 1926), 38 fathoms off Cuvier Island, and 60 fathoms off Poor Knights Islands. The numerous specimens from the last named locality are on the whole a trifle more slender, and have the sculpture on the last whorl slightly weaker, but are not worth separating as a bathymetric variety.

Type in Finlay collection.

This is the largest New Zealand species of Linemera, and is not very closely related to any other, though probably an offshoot from gradata (Hutton). From that species it is easily distinguished by its larger size, suppressed spiral sculpture, and smooth base. The pingue and gradata series, though having many points in common, are evidently by now quite distinct, since a new species, which is a pingue relative, lives together with gallinacea as a perfectly separable form; no hybrids have been seen. There do not, however, seem to be sufficient grounds, at least at present, for erecting a subgenus for the pingue-exserta group.
