= Gigantidas gladius =

Conservation status
- Vulnerable (IUCN 3.1)

Scientific classification
- Kingdom: Animalia
- Phylum: Mollusca
- Class: Bivalvia
- Order: Mytilida
- Family: Mytilidae
- Genus: Gigantidas
- Species: G. gladius

Binomial name
- Gigantidas gladius von Cosel & Marshall, 2003

Species of bivalve

Gigantidas gladius is a species of large, deepwater, hydrothermal vent mussel, a marine bivalve mollusc in the family Mytilidae, or mussels.

== Distribution and habitat ==
These mussels are found around deep-sea hydrothermal vents on the southern Kermadec Ridge, New Zealand. They form dense beds in these sites.

== Description ==
The shells of this species are up to 30 cm long.
