= Gigantidas coseli =

Scientific classification
- Kingdom: Animalia
- Phylum: Mollusca
- Class: Bivalvia
- Order: Mytilida
- Family: Mytilidae
- Genus: Gigantidas
- Species: G. coseli

Binomial name
- Gigantidas coseli Saether, Little, Campbell, Marshall, Collins & Alfaro, 2010

Species of bivalve

Gigantidas coseli is a species of large, deepwater, hydrothermal vent mussel, a marine bivalve mollusc in the family Mytilidae, the mussels. This species is endemic to the waters of the Bonin Islands of Japan.
