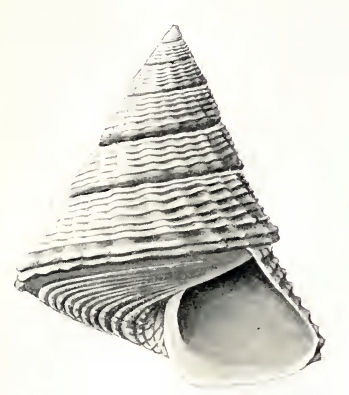
- Apertural view of a shell of Selastele retiarium

Scientific classification
- Kingdom: Animalia
- Phylum: Mollusca
- Class: Gastropoda
- Subclass: Vetigastropoda
- Order: Trochida
- Superfamily: Trochoidea
- Family: Calliostomatidae
- Genus: Selastele; Marshall, 1995

Type species
- Calliostoma onustum Odhner, 1924

= Selastele =

Genus of gastropods

Selastele is a genus of sea snails, marine gastropod molluscs in the family Calliostomatidae.

== Species ==
Species within the genus Selastele include:

- Selastele kopua (Marshall, 1995)
- Selastele limatulum (Marshall, 1995)
- Selastele onustum (Odhner, 1924)
- Selastele pictum Marshall, 1995
- Selastele retiarium (Hedley & May, 1908)
