= Dentalium suteri =

Scientific classification
- Kingdom: Animalia
- Phylum: Mollusca
- Class: Scaphopoda
- Order: Dentaliida
- Family: Dentaliidae
- Genus: Dentalium
- Species: D. suteri

Binomial name
- Dentalium suteri Emerson, 1954

Species of mollusc

Dentalium suteri is a species of tusk shell, a marine scaphopod mollusk in the family Dentaliidae.

This species is endemic to New Zealand waters.
