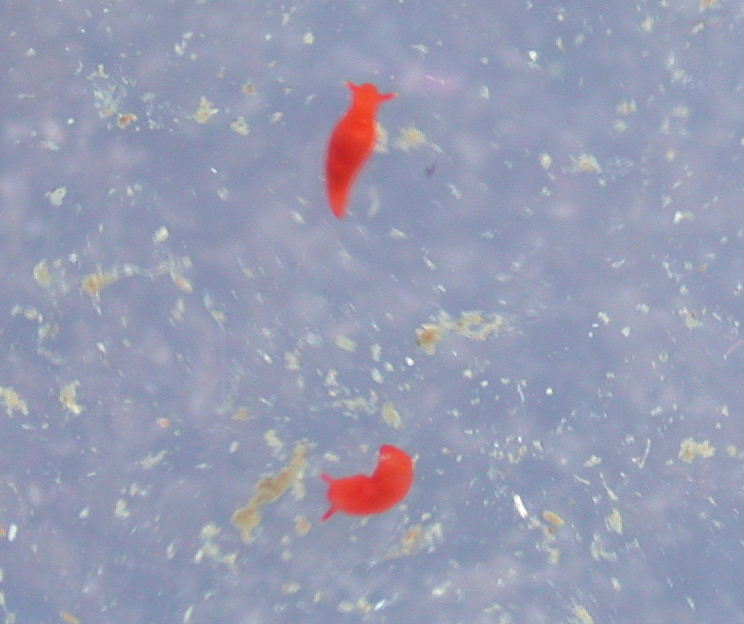

Scientific classification
- Kingdom: Animalia
- Phylum: Mollusca
- Class: Gastropoda
- Order: Nudibranchia
- Family: Okadaiidae
- Genus: Vayssierea (Risbec, 1928)

Synonyms
- Okadaia Baba, 1930; Pellibranchus Ralph, 1944

= Vayssierea =

Genus of gastropods

Vayssierea is a genus of sea slugs, dorid nudibranchs, shell-less marine gastropod mollusks in the family Okadaiidae. The exact relationship of this genus of nudibranchs is still unclear.

== Species ==
Species in the genus Vayssierea include:

- Vayssierea caledonica Risbec, 1928
- Vayssierea cinnabarea Ralph, 1944
- Vayssierea elegans (Baba, 1930)
- Vayssierea felis (Collingwood, 1881)
