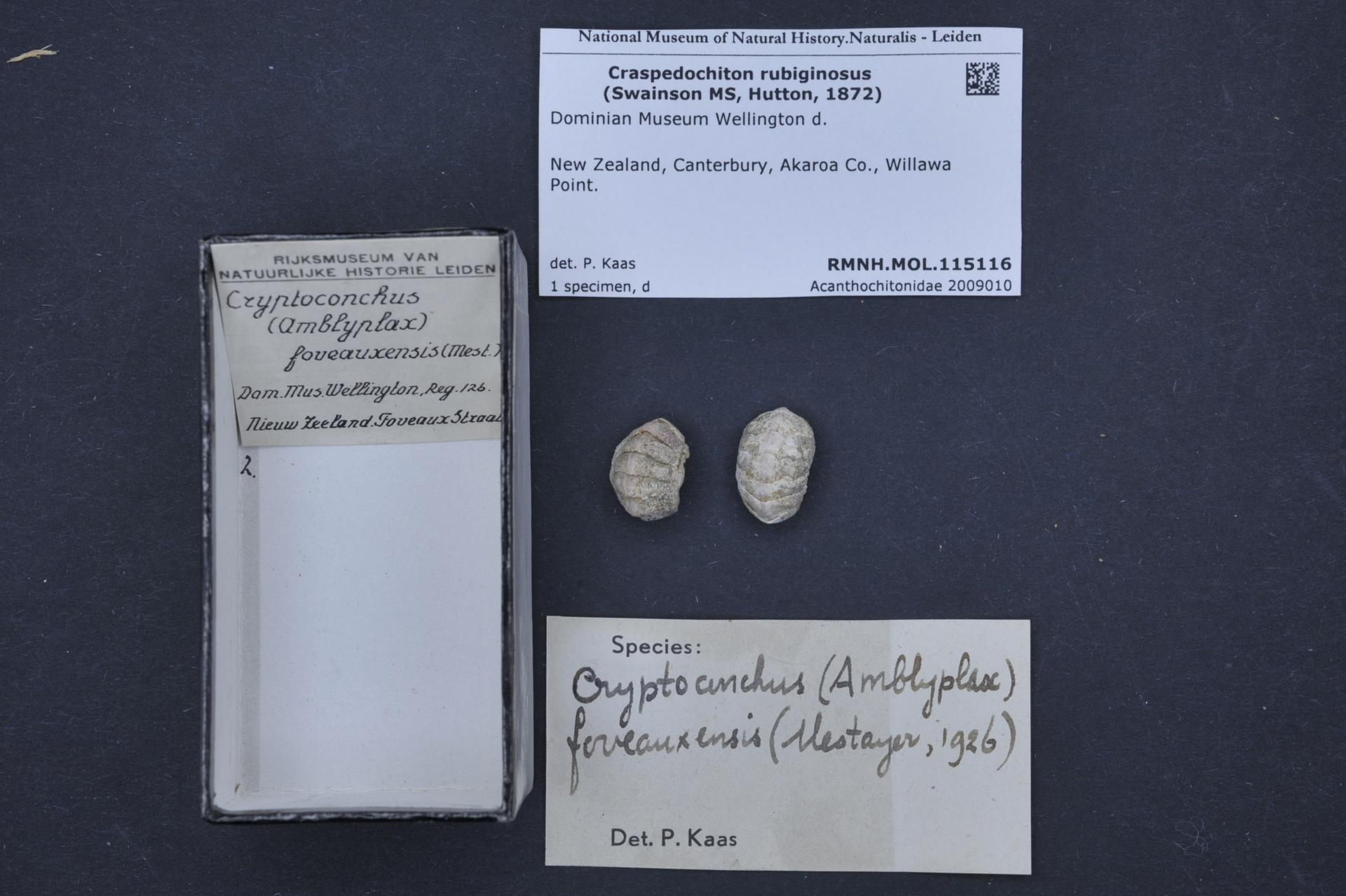
- Preserved specimen of Notoplax rubiginosa, formerly called Craspedochiton rubiginosus

Scientific classification
- Kingdom: Animalia
- Phylum: Mollusca
- Class: Polyplacophora
- Order: Chitonida
- Family: Acanthochitonidae
- Genus: Notoplax; H. Adams, 1862

Species
- See text

Synonyms
- Acanthochiton (Notoplax); Aristochiton Thiele, 1909; Cryptoplax (Notoplax) H. Adams, 1861 (basionym); Eoplax Ashby & Cotton, 1936 †; Loboplax Pilsbry, 1893; Macandrellus Dall, 1879

= Notoplax =

Notoplax Temporal range: Oligocene–Recent

Genus of molluscs

Notoplax is a genus of chitons in the family Acanthochitonidae.

== Species ==
- Notoplax acutirostrata (Reeve, 1847)
- Notoplax addenda Iredale & Hull, 1925
- Notoplax aenigma (Iredale & Hull, 1925)
- Notoplax alisonae (Winckworth MS, Kaas, 1976)
- Notoplax arabica Kaas & Van Belle, 1988
- Notoplax aupouria Powell, 1937
- Notoplax bergenhayni Kaas & Van Belle, 1998
- Notoplax brookesi Ashby, 1929
- Notoplax conica Is. & Iw. Taki, 1929
- Notoplax costata (H. Adams & Angas, 1864)
- Notoplax crocodila (Torr & Ashby, 1898)
- Notoplax cuneata (Suter, 1908)
- Notoplax curiosa (Iredale & Hull, 1925)
- Notoplax curvisetosus (Leloup, 1960): synonym of Leptoplax curvisetosa (Leloup, 1960)
- Notoplax dalli Is. & Iw. Taki, 1929
- Notoplax facilis Iredale and Hull, 1931
- Notoplax formosa (Reeve, 1847)
- Notoplax gabrieli (Ashby, 1922)
- Notoplax glauerti (Ashby, 1923)
- Notoplax hemphilli (Pilsbry, 1893)
- Notoplax hilgendorfi Thiele, 1909
- Notoplax hirta (Thiele, 1909)
- Notoplax holosericea (Nierstrasz, 1905)
- Notoplax jaubertensis (Ashby, 1924)
- Notoplax kaasi Hong, Dell'Angelo & Van Belle, 1990
- Notoplax lancemilnei Gowlett-Holmes, 1988
- Notoplax latalamina Dell, 1956
- Notoplax leuconota (Hedley & Hull, 1912)
- Notoplax macandrewi Iredale & Hull, 1925
- Notoplax magellanica Thiele, 1909
- Notoplax mariae (Webster, 1908)
- Notoplax mayi (Ashby, 1922)
- Notoplax richardi Kaas, 1990
- Notoplax richeri Kaas, 1990
- Notoplax rosea (Leloup, 1940)
- Notoplax rostellata Kaas, 1990
- Notoplax rubiginosa (Hutton, 1872)
- Notoplax rubrostrata (Torr, 1912)
- Notoplax speciosa (H. Adams, 1861)
- Notoplax sphenorhyncha (Iredale & Hull, 1925)
- Notoplax squamopleura Bergenhayn, 1933
- Notoplax subviridis (Torr, 1911)
- Notoplax tateyamaensis (Wu & Okutani, 1995)
- Notoplax tateyamaensis Taki, 1962
- Notoplax tridacna (Rochebrune, 1881)
- Notoplax violacea (Quoy & Gaimard, 1835)
- Notoplax websteri Powell, 1937
- Notoplax wilsoni Sykes, 1896

Species brought into synonymy

- Notoplax aqabaensis: synonym of Leptoplax curvisetosa (Leloup, 1960)
- Notoplax curvisetosus Leloup, 1960 accepted as Leptoplax curvisetosa (Leloup, 1960)
- Notoplax doederleini Thiele, 1909: synonym of Leptoplax doederleini (Thiele, 1909)
- Notoplax elegans Leloup, 1981: synonym of Leptoplax curvisetosa (Leloup, 1960)
- Notoplax floridanus Dall, 1889: synonym of Cryptoconchus floridanus (Dall, 1889)
- Notoplax foresti Leloup, 1965: synonym of Craspedochiton foresti (Leloup, 1965)
- Notoplax producta (Phil): synonym of Craspedochiton producta (Carpenter in Pilsbry, 1892)
