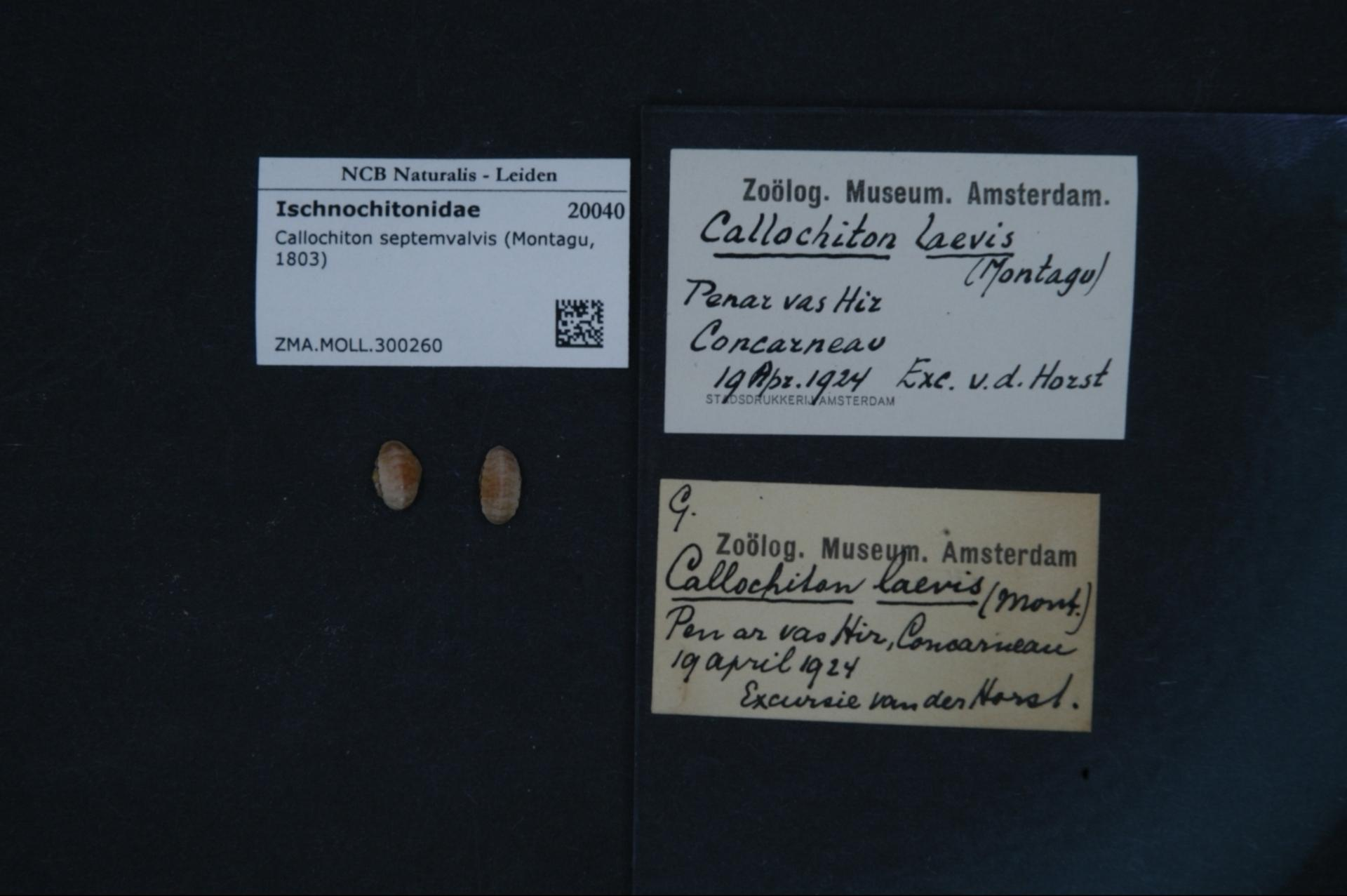

Scientific classification
- Kingdom: Animalia
- Phylum: Mollusca
- Class: Polyplacophora
- Order: Chitonida
- Family: Ischnochitonidae
- Genus: Callochiton
- Species: C. septemvalvis

Binomial name
- Callochiton septemvalvis Montagu, 1803

= Callochiton septemvalvis =

Species of mollusc

Callochiton septemvalvis, the smooth European chiton or smooth mail-shell is a medium-sized species of polyplacophoran mollusc in the family Ishnochitonidae. It was initially described by George Montagu in 1803 and can be found throughout Europe in shallow waters and several seas including the Mediterranean sea.

== Description ==
The smooth European chiton has a medium-sized shell of about 15 to 25 mm, which is smooth, broad, and oval in outline. It is red brick to orange and has eight valves which appear smooth to the naked eye, but are in fact composed of diagonal ridges and small granules that are only visible under microscope. This chiton has a wide body, which is about half or more its body length and Its girdle is broad and covered with small spicules.

== Distribution and habitat ==
The smooth European chiton is commonly found in shallow waters around most of Europe in the intertidal zone up to 1000 m or 3,300 ft depth. Its distribution area spans around most of Europe from Scandinavia to the Canary Islands as well as in the Mediterranean and the Red Sea. It can be found on red coralline algae and other hard substrates.

== Feeding ==
The smooth European chiton is a grazer but may also feed on deposits of organic sediments.
