= Aerilamma murdochi =

Scientific classification
- Kingdom: Animalia
- Phylum: Mollusca
- Class: Polyplacophora
- Order: Chitonida
- Family: Mopaliidae
- Genus: Plaxiphora
- Species: P. murdochi

Binomial name
- Plaxiphora murdochi (Reeve, 1847)

Synonyms
- Plaxiphora murdochi Suter, 1905

Species of mollusc

Aerilamma murdochi is an uncommon species of chiton in the family Mopaliidae.

== Distribution ==
New Zealand
