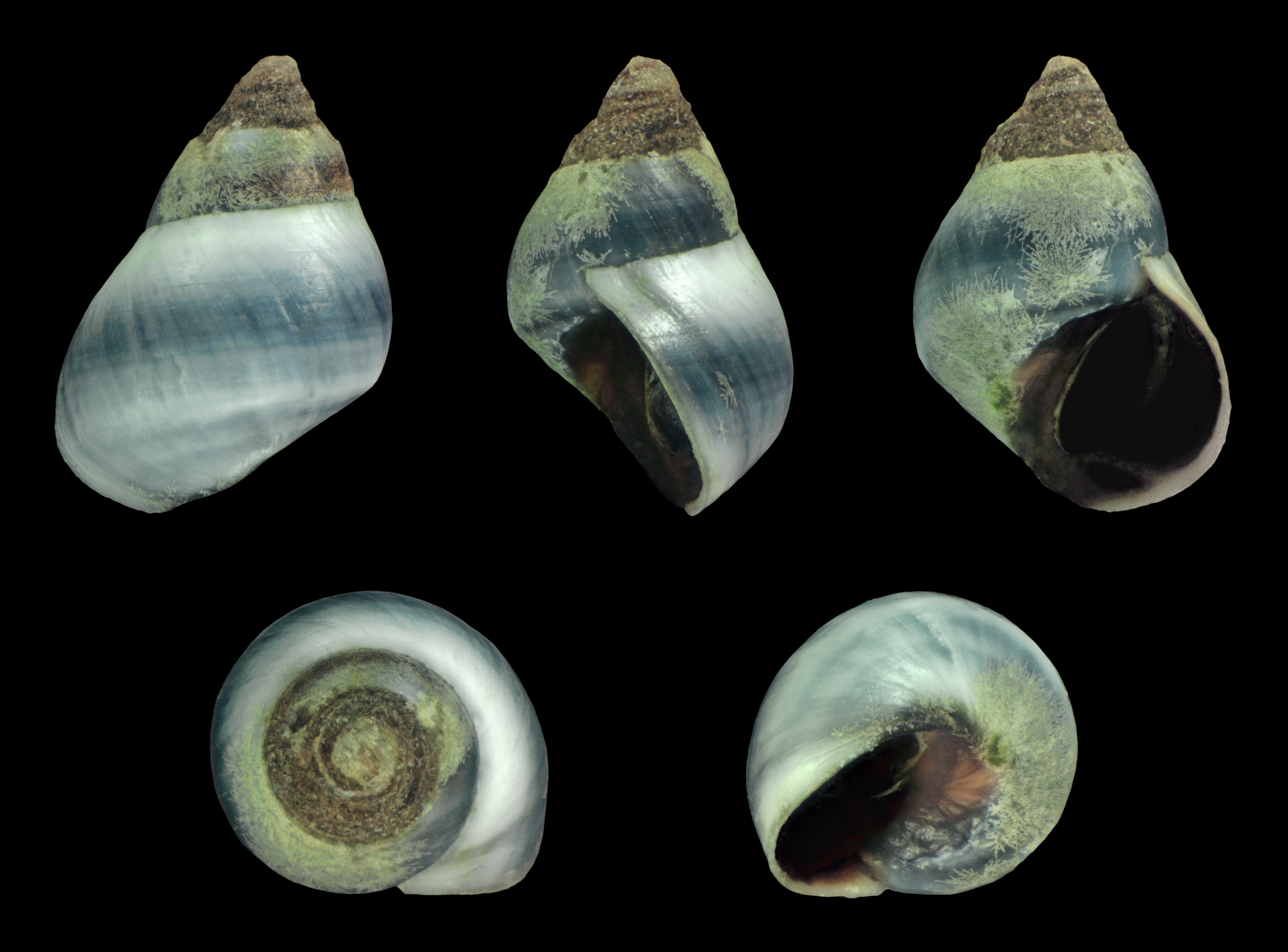

Scientific classification
- Kingdom: Animalia
- Phylum: Mollusca
- Class: Gastropoda
- Subclass: Caenogastropoda
- Order: Littorinimorpha
- Family: Littorinidae
- Genus: Austrolittorina
- Species: A. antipodum

Binomial name
- Austrolittorina antipodum Philippi, 1847

Synonyms
- Echinolittorina antipodum (Philippi, 1847); Littorina antipodum Philippi, 1847; Melarhaphe oliveri Finlay, 1930; Littorina unifasciata antipodum Rosewater, 1970; Nodilittorina antipodum (R. A. Philippi, 1847) superseded combination

= Austrolittorina antipodum =

Blue banded periwinkle

Species of gastropod

Austrolittorina antipodum, known as the banded periwinkle, is a species of small sea snail, a marine gastropod in the winkles and periwinkles family, Littorinidae.

== Description ==
The length of the shell attains 19 mm, its diameter 12 mm.

(Original description in Latin) The shell is small, elevated-conic, and acute, featuring a base that is obscurely angled. It is bluish-white in color and encircled by brown bands. The sculpture consists of impressed transverse striae that are set some distance apart. The whorls are flat, and the body whorl is not at all dilated. The aperture, which is shorter than the spire, is blackish-brown and marked by the usual white basal zone. Finally, the columella is depressed and rectilinear.

== Distribution ==
This marine species occurs off New Zealand., also at the Kermadec Islands, Stewart Island, Snares Islands and Chatham Islands.
