= Leloupia =

Scientific classification
- Domain: Eukaryota
- Kingdom: Animalia
- Phylum: Mollusca
- Class: Polyplacophora
- Order: Chitonida
- Family: Callochitonidae
- Genus: Leloupia; Kaas & Van Belle, 1990
- Species: L. belgicae

Binomial name
- Leloupia belgicae (Pelseneer, 1903)

Genus of molluscs

Leloupia is a monotypic genus of chitons belonging to the family Callochitonidae. The only species is Leloupia belgicae.
