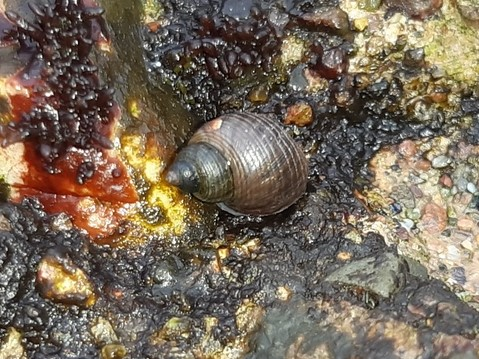

Scientific classification
- Kingdom: Animalia
- Phylum: Mollusca
- Class: Gastropoda
- Subclass: Caenogastropoda
- Order: Littorinimorpha
- Family: Littorinidae
- Genus: Austrolittorina
- Species: A. araucana

Binomial name
- Austrolittorina araucana (d'Orbigny, 1840)

Synonyms
- Echinolittorina araucana (d'Orbigny, 1840); Littorina araucana d'Orbigny, 1840; Nodilittorina araucana (d’Orbigny, 1840)

= Austrolittorina araucana =

Species of gastropod

Austrolittorina araucana is a species of sea snail, a marine gastropod mollusk in the family Littorinidae, the winkles or periwinkles.

== Description ==
The shell measures 9 mm in length and 6 mm in diameter.

(Original description in Latin and French) The shell is oval-oblong in shape, thick, and marked by extremely fine transverse striae. It is brownish-black in color. The spire is elongated, though the apex appears eroded or torn. There are four convex whorls, terminating in an oval aperture that is black in color and marked by a white band at the anterior end. The columella is thick and flattened.

The animal possesses short and obtuse tentacles and is brown in color. At the base of the tentacle, one notices an oval white spot, in the center of which the eye is located.

The shell is oval-oblong, thick, and marked transversely by very irregular, widely spaced, and indistinct striae. The spire is somewhat elongated and eroded at the summit; it is composed of four relatively convex whorls separated by deep sutures. The aperture is oval with sharp edges, and the columella is broad and flat.

The shell is blackish-brown, varying more or less toward bluish. The interior of the aperture is brown and features a white transverse band at the anterior end.

== Distribution ==
It is found on the Pacific coast of South America.
