= Callochiton kapitiensis =

Scientific classification
- Kingdom: Animalia
- Phylum: Mollusca
- Class: Polyplacophora
- Order: Chitonida
- Family: Ischnochitonidae
- Genus: Callochiton
- Species: C. kapitiensis

Binomial name
- Callochiton kapitiensis Mestayer, 1926

Synonyms
- Chiton limans Suter, 1912

Species of mollusc

Callochiton kapitiensis is a species of chiton in the family Callochitonidae.
