= Gigantidas horikoshii =

Conservation status
- Critically Endangered (IUCN 3.1)

Scientific classification
- Kingdom: Animalia
- Phylum: Mollusca
- Class: Bivalvia
- Order: Mytilida
- Family: Mytilidae
- Genus: Gigantidas
- Species: G. horikoshii

Binomial name
- Gigantidas horikoshii Hashimoto & Yamane, 2005

Species of bivalve

Gigantidas horikoshii is a species of large, deepwater, hydrothermal vent mussel, a marine bivalve mollusc in the family Mytilidae, the mussels.

== Description ==
Shells typically 160-170 mm in length, 60 mm in height, and 57 mm wide.

== Distribution ==
The type series was collected at a depth of 435-762 m from hydrothermal vents surrounding Kaikata Seamount, near the Ogasawara Islands, Japan. It has also been recorded from the Sumisu Caldera hydrothermal vent field at a depth of 694 m (31°28.2113'N, 140°4.2833'E) in the Izu Islands arc. Mellado et al. (2022) reported a juvenile specimen from waters to the east of Taiwan.
