= Dentalium ecostatum =

Scientific classification
- Kingdom: Animalia
- Phylum: Mollusca
- Class: Scaphopoda
- Order: Dentaliida
- Family: Dentaliidae
- Genus: Dentalium
- Species: D. ecostatum

Binomial name
- Dentalium ecostatum T. W. Kirk, 1880

Species of mollusc

Dentalium ecostatum is a species of tusk shell, a marine scaphopod mollusk in the family Dentaliidae.

This species is endemic to New Zealand waters.
