= Dentalium glaucarena =

Scientific classification
- Kingdom: Animalia
- Phylum: Mollusca
- Class: Scaphopoda
- Order: Dentaliida
- Family: Dentaliidae
- Genus: Dentalium
- Species: D. glaucarena

Binomial name
- Dentalium glaucarena Dell, 1953

Species of mollusc

Dentalium glaucarena is a species of tusk shell, a marine scaphopod mollusk in the family Dentaliidae.

== Distribution ==
This species is endemic to the waters of New Zealand.
