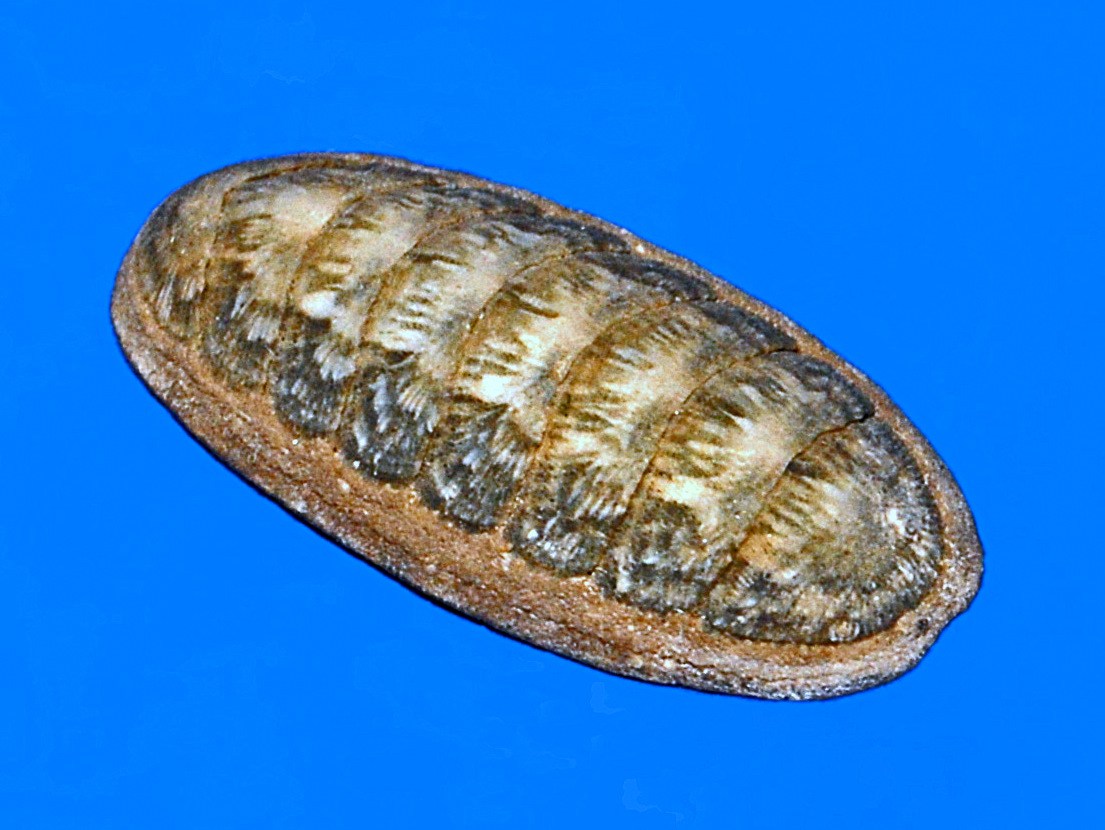
- Dorsal view of Notoplax subviridis. Museum specimen

Scientific classification
- Kingdom: Animalia
- Phylum: Mollusca
- Class: Polyplacophora
- Order: Chitonida
- Family: Acanthochitonidae
- Genus: Notoplax
- Species: N. subviridis

Binomial name
- Notoplax subviridis (Torr, 1911)

Synonyms
- Acanthochites subviridis Torr, 1911

= Notoplax subviridis =

Species of mollusc

Notoplax subviridis is a species of chiton in the family Acanthochitonidae.

== Distribution ==
This species can be found in Western Australia.
