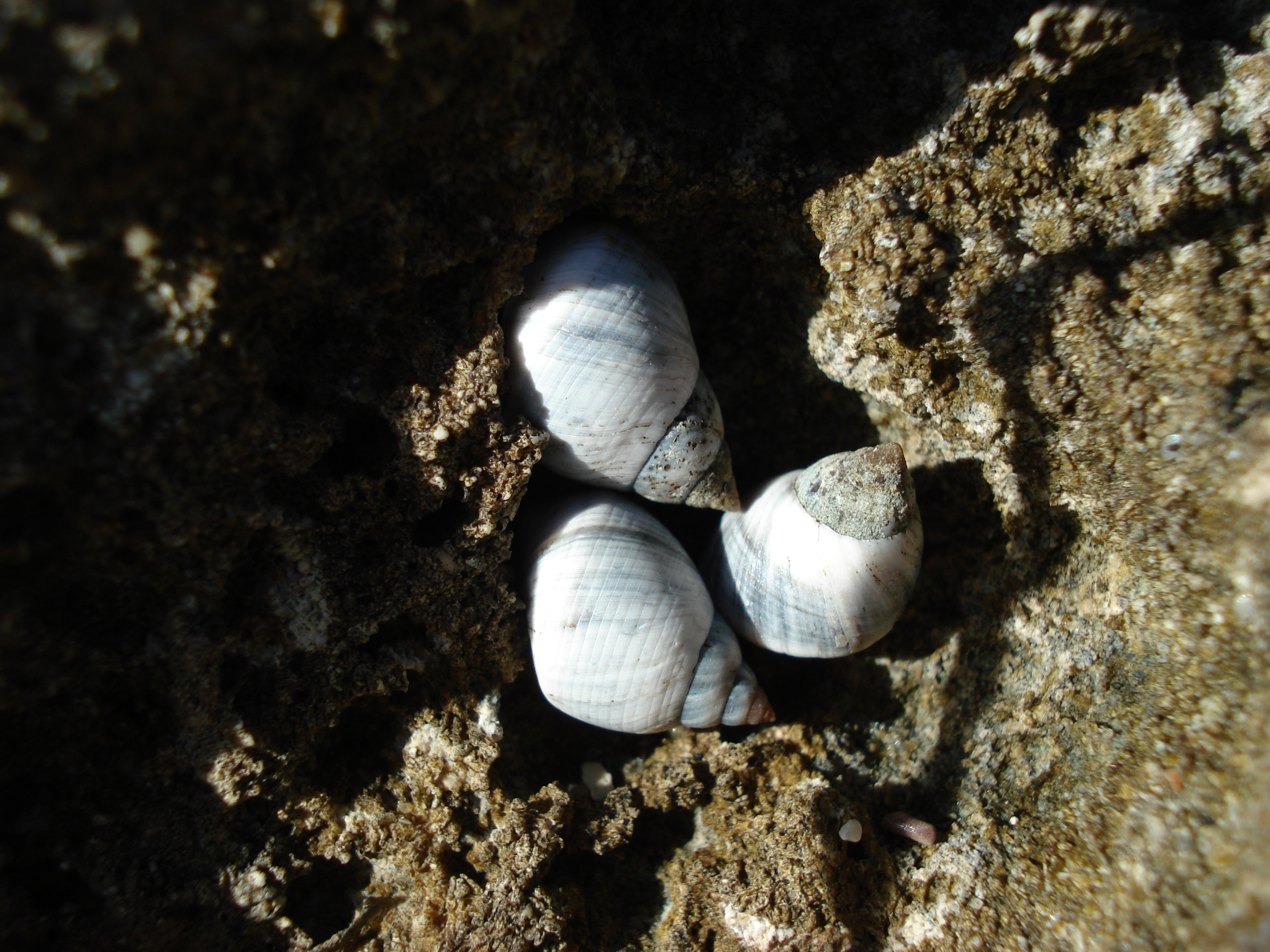
- Austrolittorina unifasciata

Scientific classification
- Kingdom: Animalia
- Phylum: Mollusca
- Class: Gastropoda
- Subclass: Caenogastropoda
- Order: Littorinimorpha
- Family: Littorinidae
- Subfamily: Littorininae
- Genus: Austrolittorina; Rosewater, 1970

Synonyms
- Littorina (Austrolittorina) Rosewater, 1970

= Austrolittorina =

Genus of gastropods

Austrolittorina is a genus of sea snails, marine gastropod mollusks in the family Littorinidae, the winkles or periwinkles.

== Characteristics ==
The shell surface is either smooth or characterized by spiral folds (carinate). The base of the shell adjacent to the columella is flattened or hollowed out, forming a distinct, crescent-shaped area.

== Species ==
Species within the genus Austrolittorina include:

- Austrolittorina antipodum (Philippi, 1847)
- Austrolittorina araucana (d'Orbigny, 1840)
- Austrolittorina cincta (Quoy & Gaimard, 1833)
- Austrolittorina fernandezensis (Rosewater, 1970)
- Austrolittorina unifasciata (Gray, 1826)
