= Dentalium tiwhana =

Scientific classification
- Kingdom: Animalia
- Phylum: Mollusca
- Class: Scaphopoda
- Order: Dentaliida
- Family: Dentaliidae
- Genus: Dentalium
- Species: D. tiwhana

Binomial name
- Dentalium tiwhana Dell, 1953

Species of mollusc

Dentalium tiwhana is a tusk shell of the family Dentaliidae, endemic to New Zealand waters.
