= Selastele limatulum =

Scientific classification
- Kingdom: Animalia
- Phylum: Mollusca
- Class: Gastropoda
- Subclass: Vetigastropoda
- Order: Trochida
- Family: Calliostomatidae
- Genus: Selastele
- Species: S. limatulum

Binomial name
- Selastele limatulum (Marshall, 1995)

Synonyms
- Calliostoma (sensu lato) limatulum Marshall, 1995

Species of gastropod

Selastele limatulum is a species of sea snail, a marine gastropod mollusc in the family Calliostomatidae.

== Description ==
The height of the shell attains 6.6 mm.

== Distribution ==
This marine species occurs off New Zealand.
