= Callochiton mortenseni =

Scientific classification
- Kingdom: Animalia
- Phylum: Mollusca
- Class: Polyplacophora
- Order: Chitonida
- Family: Ischnochitonidae
- Genus: Callochiton
- Species: C. mortenseni

Binomial name
- Callochiton mortenseni Odhner, 1924

Species of mollusc

Callochiton mortenseni is a species of chiton in the family Callochitonidae.
