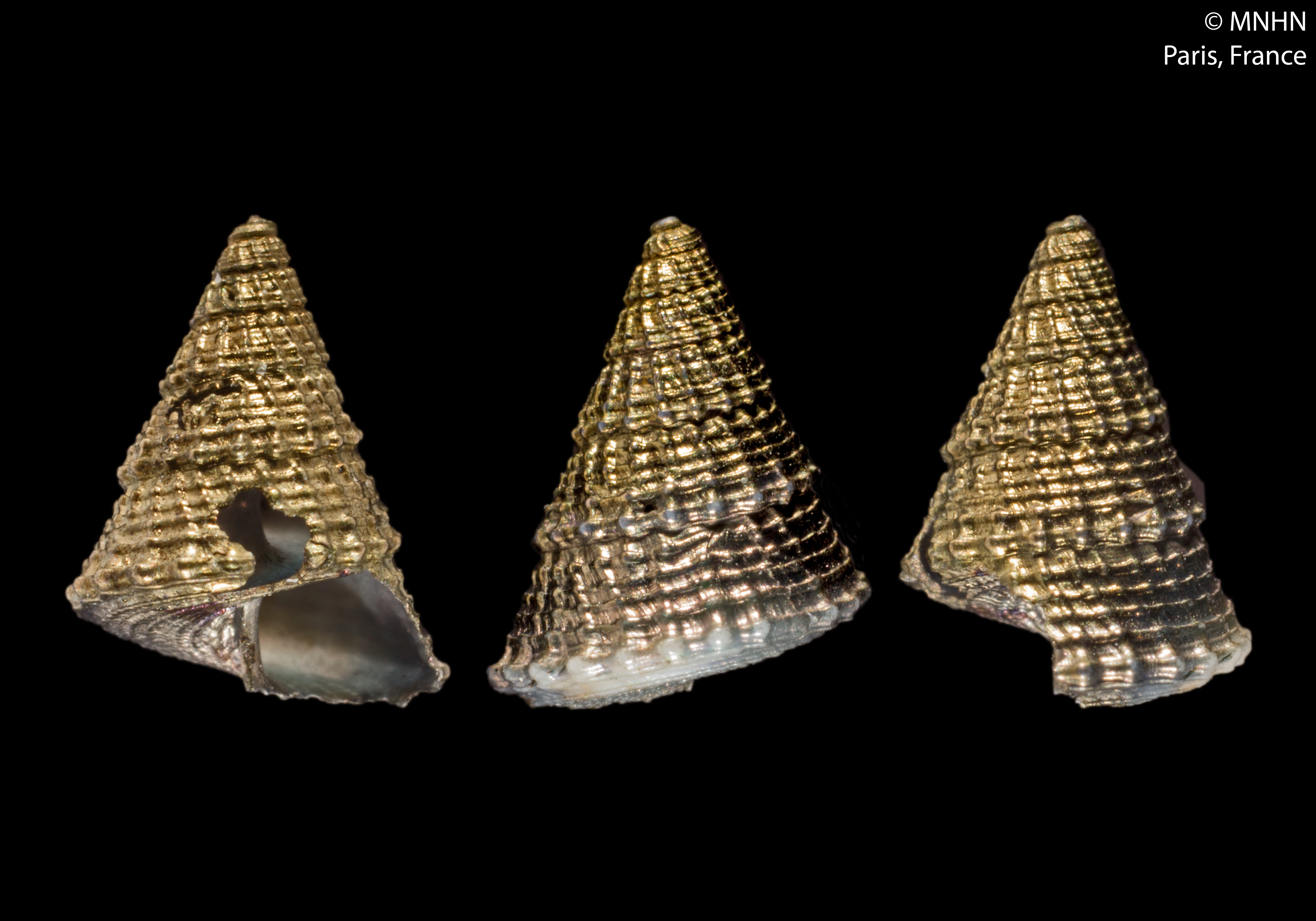
- Shell of Selastele pictum (holotype at MNHN, Paris)

Scientific classification
- Kingdom: Animalia
- Phylum: Mollusca
- Class: Gastropoda
- Subclass: Vetigastropoda
- Order: Trochida
- Family: Calliostomatidae
- Genus: Selastele
- Species: S. pictum

Binomial name
- Selastele pictum Marshall, 1995

= Selastele pictum =

Species of gastropod

Selastele pictum is a species of sea snail, a marine gastropod mollusc in the family Calliostomatidae.

== Description ==
The height of the shell attains 6 mm.

== Distribution ==
This marine species occurs off the Loyalty Islands at a depth of 370 m.
