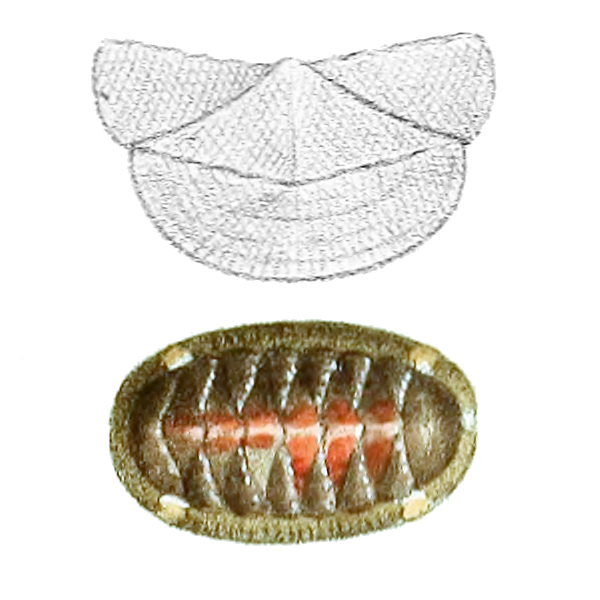
- Top: terminal valve from dorsal Bottom: animal from dorsal

Scientific classification
- Kingdom: Animalia
- Phylum: Mollusca
- Class: Polyplacophora
- Order: Chitonida
- Family: Ischnochitonidae
- Genus: Callochiton
- Species: C. crocinus

Binomial name
- Callochiton crocinus (Reeve, 1847)

Synonyms
- Numerous, see text

= Callochiton crocinus =

Species of mollusc

Callochiton crocinus is a species of chiton or "sea cradle" in the family Callochitonidae. It occurs on the shores of the Australia-New Zealand region. Locally, it is known as "smooth chiton", but that name is elsewhere applied to other species.

It is a rather colorful member of its class, yellowish- to reddish-brown with white spots; its scientific name means "saffron-colored beautiful chiton".

== Synonyms ==
This chiton has a somewhat convoluted taxonomic history, being described no less than four times as supposedly new species. Tom Iredale believed the individual variation found in C. crocinus represented no less than three different species – actually, these were not even subspecies but merely chance variants – while Arthur Adams, unaware that the animal had already been validly described shortly before he did, established a name that was a junior homonym. The invalid names of the present species are thus:

- Callochiton platessa Suter, 1913
- Chiton crocinus Reeve, 1847
- Chiton versicolor A. Adams, 1852 (non G.B.Sowerby II, 1839: preoccupied)
- Levicoplax platessa (Suter, 1913)
- Paricoplax crocina (Reeve, 1847)
- Paricoplax perscrutanda Iredale & Hull, 1929
