= Annaperenna =

Scientific classification
- Kingdom: Animalia
- Phylum: Mollusca
- Class: Gastropoda
- Subclass: Caenogastropoda
- Order: Littorinimorpha
- Superfamily: Tonnoidea
- Family: Bursidae
- Genus: Annaperenna; Iredale, 1936

Type species
- Ranella verrucosa G. B. Sowerby I, 1825

Genus of gastropods

Annaperenna is a genus of sea snails, marine gastropod mollusks in the family Bursidae, the frog shells.

== Species ==
- Annaperenna verrucosa (G. B. Sowerby I, 1825)
