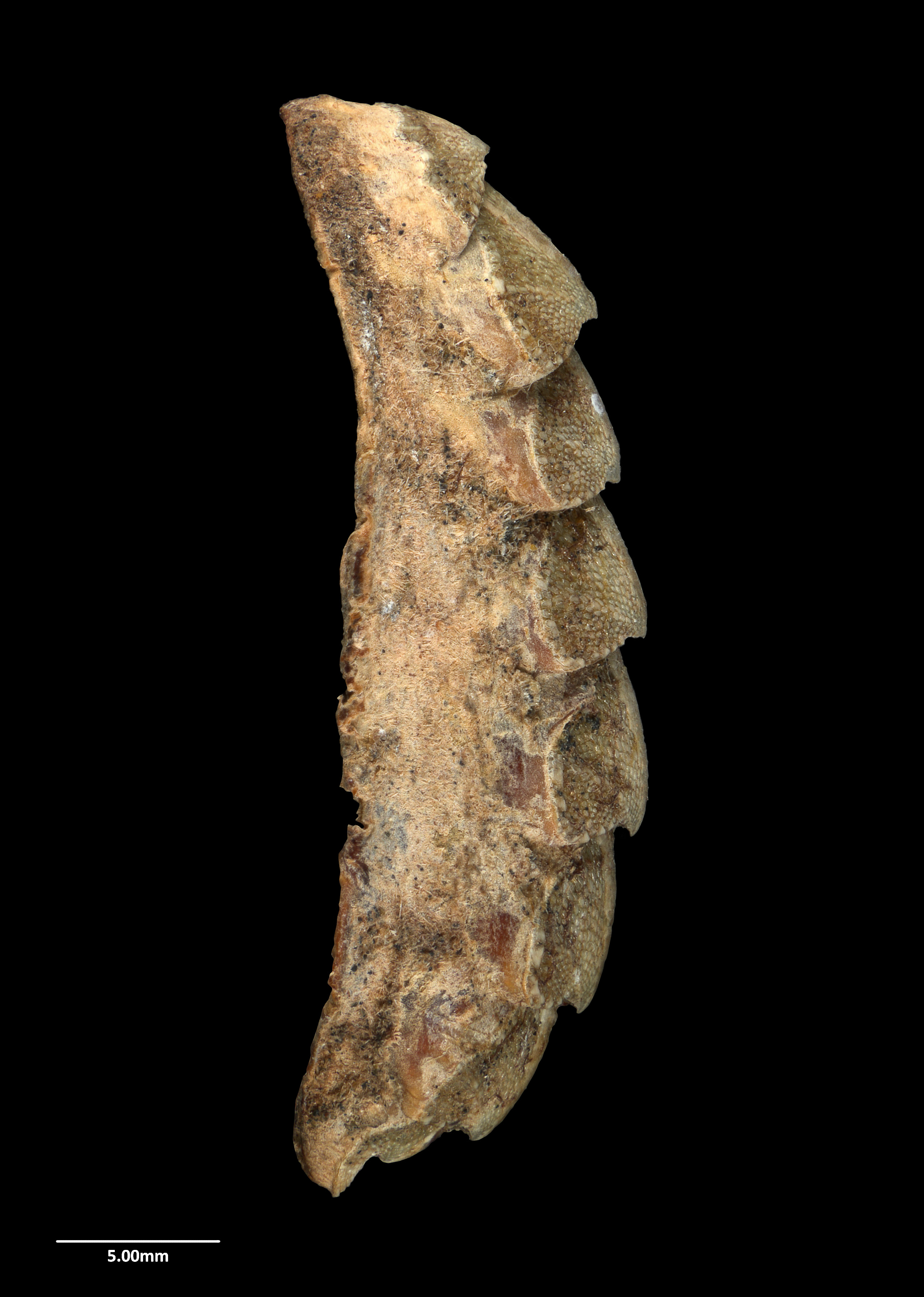

Scientific classification
- Kingdom: Animalia
- Phylum: Mollusca
- Class: Polyplacophora
- Order: Chitonida
- Family: Acanthochitonidae
- Genus: Notoplax
- Species: N. mariae

Binomial name
- Notoplax mariae (Webster, 1908)

Synonyms
- Acanthochites mariae Webster, 1908; Loboplax stewartiana Thiele, 1909; Acanthochites mariae Suter, 1913; Notoplax mariae haurakiensis Ashby, 1926; Notoplax brookesi Ashby, 1929

= Notoplax mariae =

Species of mollusc

Notoplax mariae is a species of chiton in the family Acanthochitonidae.
