= Selastele onustum =

Scientific classification
- Kingdom: Animalia
- Phylum: Mollusca
- Class: Gastropoda
- Subclass: Vetigastropoda
- Order: Trochida
- Family: Calliostomatidae
- Genus: Selastele
- Species: S. onustum

Binomial name
- Selastele onustum (Odhner, 1924)

Synonyms
- Calliostoma onustum Odhner, 1924; Fautor onustus (Odhner, 1924)

Species of gastropod

Selastele onustum is a species of sea snail, a marine gastropod mollusc in the family Calliostomatidae.

== Distribution ==
This marine species occurs off New Zealand.
