= Notoplax cuneata =

Scientific classification
- Kingdom: Animalia
- Phylum: Mollusca
- Class: Polyplacophora
- Order: Chitonida
- Family: Acanthochitonidae
- Genus: Notoplax
- Species: N. cuneata

Binomial name
- Notoplax cuneata (Suter, 1908)

Synonyms
- Tonica cuneata Suter, 1908

Species of mollusc

Notoplax cuneata is a rare species of chiton in the family Acanthochitonidae.
