= Homalopoma fluctuata =

Scientific classification
- Kingdom: Animalia
- Phylum: Mollusca
- Class: Gastropoda
- Subclass: Vetigastropoda
- Order: Trochida
- Family: Colloniidae
- Genus: Homalopoma
- Species: H. fluctuata

Binomial name
- Homalopoma fluctuata (Hutton, 1883)

Synonyms
- Cyclostrema fluctuata Hutton, 1883; Leptothyra fluctuata immaculata Suter, 1908

Species of gastropod

Homalopoma fluctuata is a species of small sea snail, a marine gastropod mollusc in the family Colloniidae.

== Distribution ==
This species occurs in New Zealand.
