= Notoplax latalamina =

Scientific classification
- Kingdom: Animalia
- Phylum: Mollusca
- Class: Polyplacophora
- Order: Chitonida
- Family: Acanthochitonidae
- Genus: Notoplax
- Species: N. latalamina

Binomial name
- Notoplax latalamina Dell, 1956

Species of mollusc

Notoplax latalamina is a species of chiton in the family Acanthochitonidae.
