= Notoplax facilis =

Scientific classification
- Kingdom: Animalia
- Phylum: Mollusca
- Class: Polyplacophora
- Order: Chitonida
- Family: Acanthochitonidae
- Genus: Notoplax
- Species: N. facilis

Binomial name
- Notoplax facilis Iredale and Hull, 1931

Species of mollusc

Notoplax facilis is a very rare species of chiton in the family Acanthochitonidae.
