= Rhyssoplax suteri =

Scientific classification
- Kingdom: Animalia
- Phylum: Mollusca
- Class: Polyplacophora
- Order: Chitonida
- Family: Chitonidae
- Genus: Rhyssoplax
- Species: R. suteri

Binomial name
- Rhyssoplax suteri (Iredale, 1910)

Synonyms
- Chiton suteri Iredale, 1910

Species of mollusc

Rhyssoplax suteri is a rare species of chiton in the family Chitonidae.
