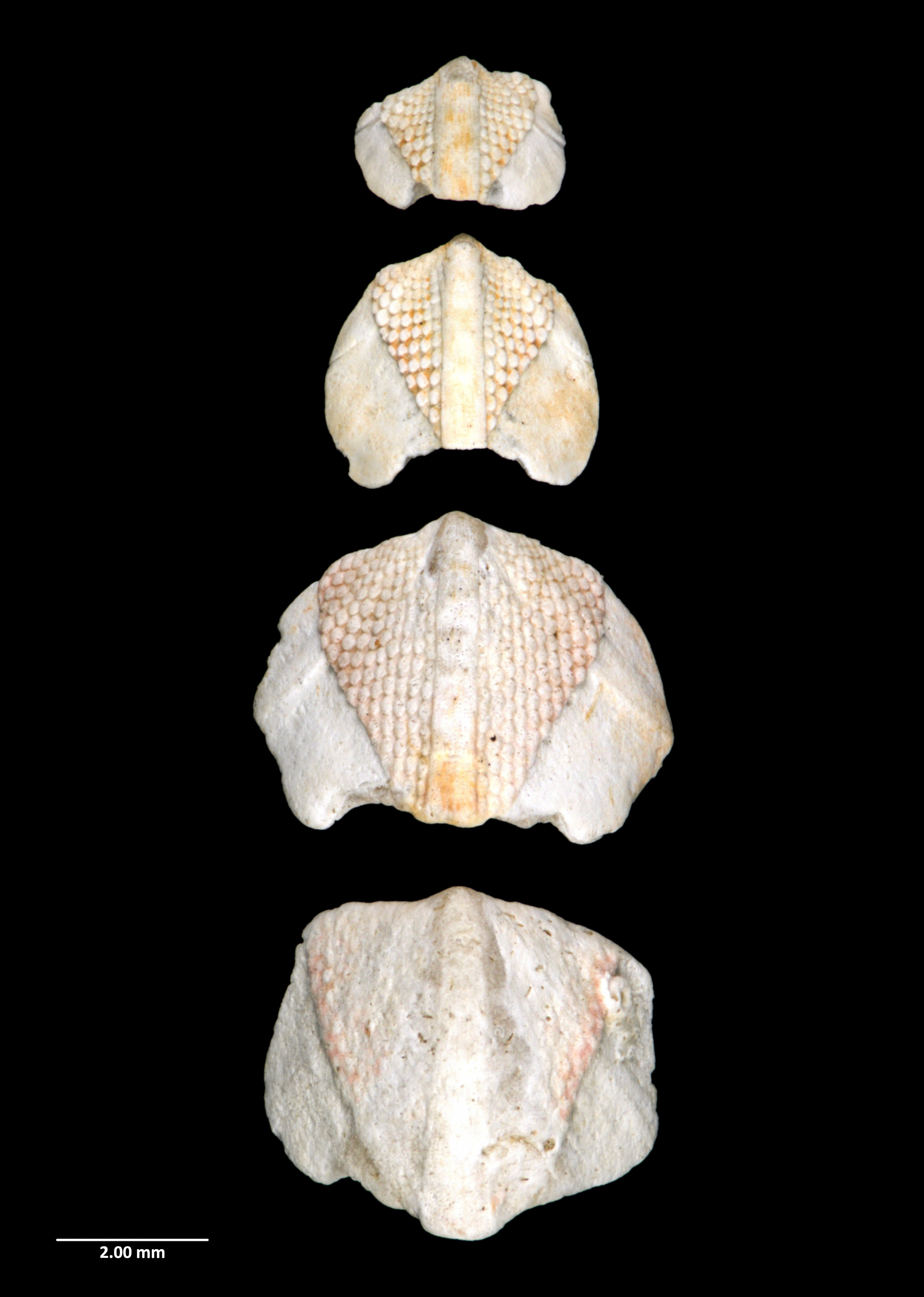

Scientific classification
- Kingdom: Animalia
- Phylum: Mollusca
- Class: Polyplacophora
- Order: Chitonida
- Family: Acanthochitonidae
- Genus: Notoplax
- Species: N. aupouria

Binomial name
- Notoplax aupouria Powell, 1937

= Notoplax aupouria =

Species of mollusc

Notoplax aupouria is a very rare species of chiton in the family Acanthochitonidae.
