= Rhyssoplax chathamensis =

Scientific classification
- Kingdom: Animalia
- Phylum: Mollusca
- Class: Polyplacophora
- Order: Chitonida
- Family: Chitonidae
- Genus: Rhyssoplax
- Species: R. chathamensis

Binomial name
- Rhyssoplax chathamensis (Dell, 1960)

Synonyms
- Icoplax chathamensis Dell, 1960

Species of mollusc

Rhyssoplax chathamensis is a species of chiton in the family Chitonidae.
