= Rhyssoplax clavata =

Scientific classification
- Kingdom: Animalia
- Phylum: Mollusca
- Class: Polyplacophora
- Order: Chitonida
- Family: Chitonidae
- Genus: Rhyssoplax
- Species: R. clavata

Binomial name
- Rhyssoplax clavata (Suter, 1907)

Synonyms
- Chiton clavatus Suter, 1907

Species of mollusc

Rhyssoplax clavata is an uncommon species of chiton in the family Chitonidae.
