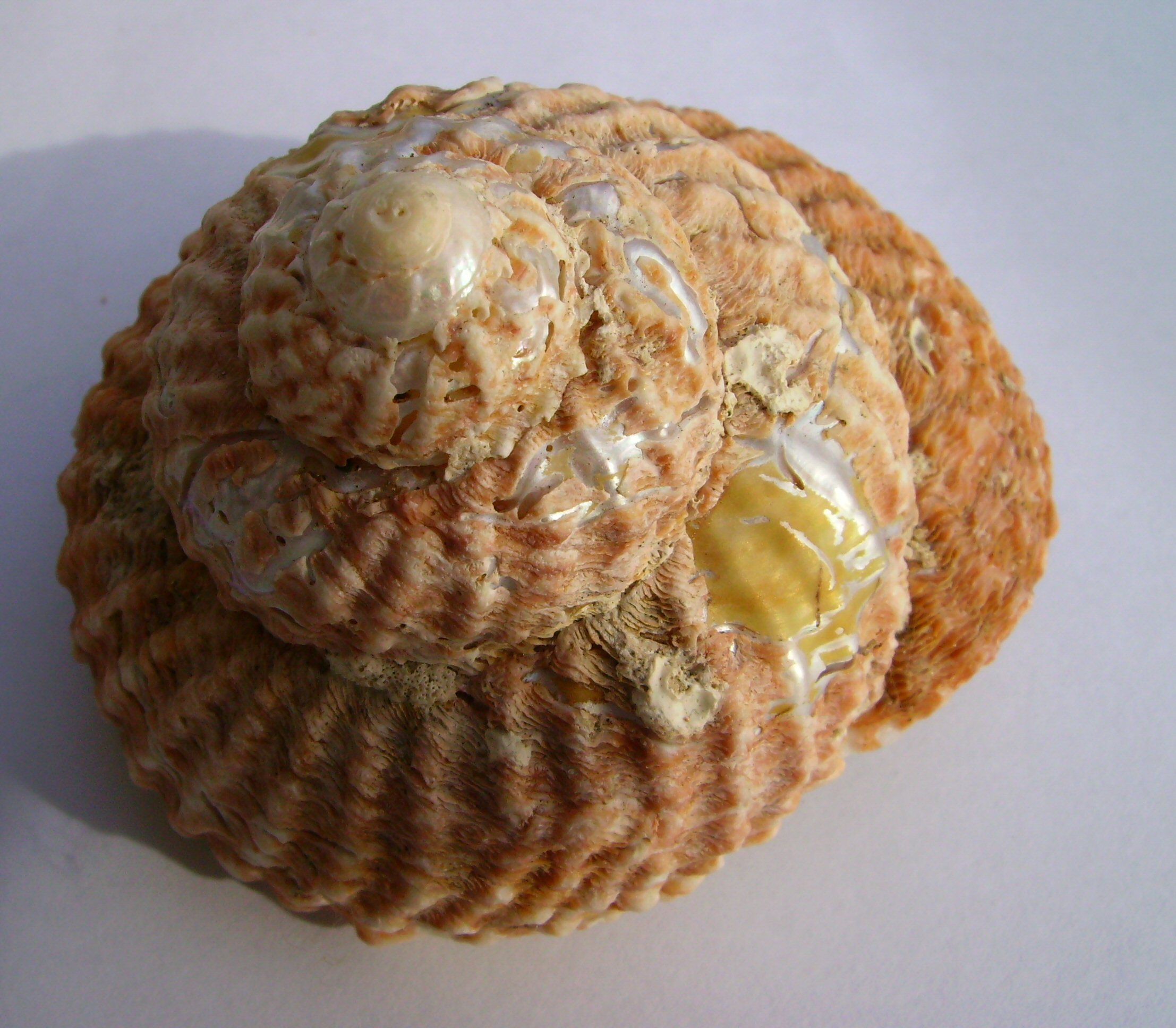
- Dorsal view of a shell
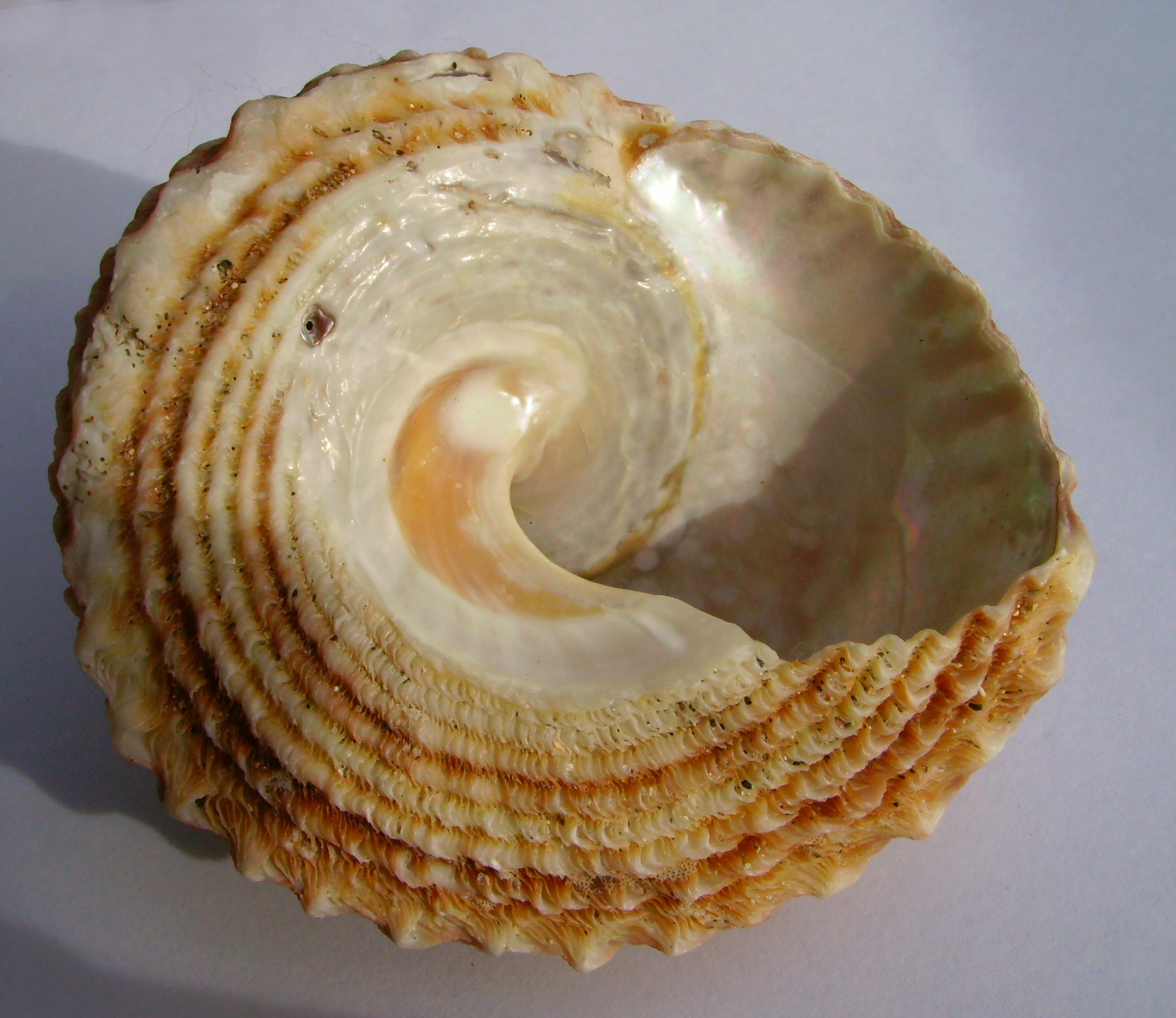
- Umbilical view

Scientific classification
- Kingdom: Animalia
- Phylum: Mollusca
- Class: Gastropoda
- Subclass: Vetigastropoda
- Order: Trochida
- Family: Turbinidae
- Genus: Cookia
- Species: C. sulcata

Binomial name
- Cookia sulcata (Gmelin, 1791)

Synonyms
- Astraea cookii (Gmelin, 1791); Astraea sulcata (Martyn, 1784); Astralium (Cookia) sulcatum Martyn, 1784; Bolma (Cookia) sulcata (Gmelin, 1791); Cookia nobilis Lesson; Cookia novaezelandiae Lesson, 1832; Trochus cookii Gmelin, 1791; Trochus sulcatus Gmelin, 1791; Trochus sulcatus Martyn, 1784 (rejected name)

= Cookia sulcata =

Species of gastropod

Cookia sulcata, or Cook's turban, is a species of large sea snail, a marine gastropod mollusc in the family Turbinidae, the turban snails.

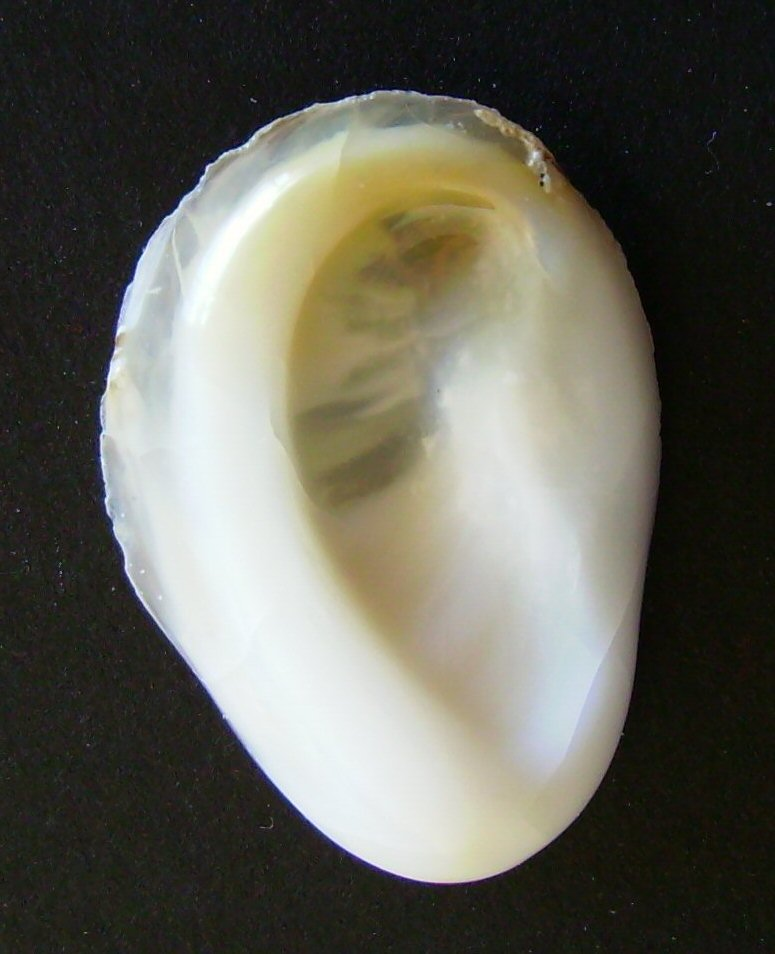
Operculum

== Description ==
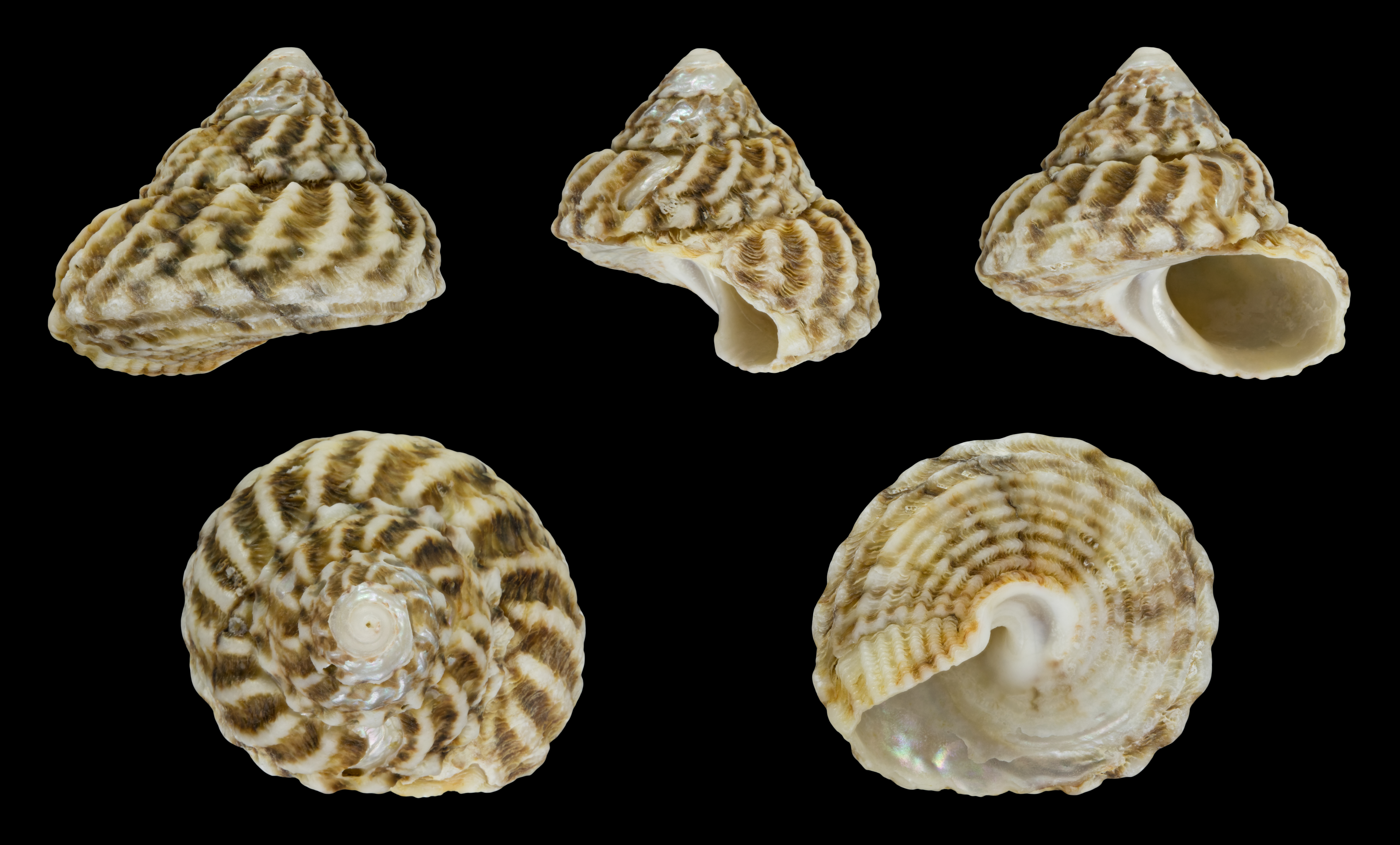
Juvenile

The length of the shell varies between 50 mm and 90 mm. The large, imperforate, rather thin shell is conic. The periphery is rounded. The spire is more or less elevated. The sutures are deeply impressed. The seven whorls are well rounded, with close lamellose incremental striae, and corrugated by obliquely descending subtuberculose folds. The base is flattened bearing concentric densely squamose lirae, deeply concave in the center, and indented in the place of the umbilicus. The aperture is transversely oval, very oblique, pearly and somewhat corrugated within. The thin columella is arcuate. The umbilical region and part of base is covered with a thin callus. The operculum is brownish or white inside.

The median tooth of the radula has a long basal plate and a short body. It bears no cusp, and has small supporting wings. The first lateral also is much like that in Pomaulax. The others bear cusps. The inner marginal is very broad, with wide cusp. The cusps of outer marginals are simple.

== Distribution ==
This marine species occurs off New Zealand.
