= Notoplax websteri =

Scientific classification
- Kingdom: Animalia
- Phylum: Mollusca
- Class: Polyplacophora
- Order: Chitonida
- Family: Acanthochitonidae
- Genus: Notoplax
- Species: N. websteri

Binomial name
- Notoplax websteri (Quoy and Gaimard, 1835)

Species of mollusc

Notoplax websteri is a very rare species of chiton in the family Acanthochitonidae.
