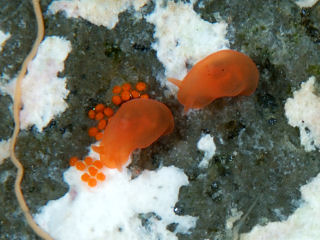

Scientific classification
- Kingdom: Animalia
- Phylum: Mollusca
- Class: Gastropoda
- Order: Nudibranchia
- Superfamily: Polyceroidea
- Family: Okadaiidae
- Genus: Vayssierea
- Species: V. felis

Binomial name
- Vayssierea felis (Collingwood, 1881).

= Vayssierea felis =

Species of gastropod

Vayssierea felis is a species of sea slug, a dorid nudibranch, a marine gastropod mollusk in the family Okadaiidae.

== Description ==
This red-orange nudibranch can grow up to 6mm in size. It reproduces by direct development and lays an egg mass of 3-5 eggs.

== Range ==
This species was originally named in the South China sea, however many argue that all Vayssierea are one species with a wider range that occurs in the Indo-West Pacific. It has also recently been documented in its non-native range in San Diego, CA.

== Habitat ==
This species can be found in the intertidal zone, usually associated with the Spirorbis tube worms they eat.

== Ecology ==
V. felis feeds on Spirorbis tube worms in the intertidal zone.

== Taxonomy ==
This species, originally found in the South China Sea, was named Trevelyana felis by Collingwood, in 1881. It genus was later changed when more information was discovered. The exact taxonomic placement of this organism is still debated and many people believe that all Vayssierea spp. should be under this one species name.
