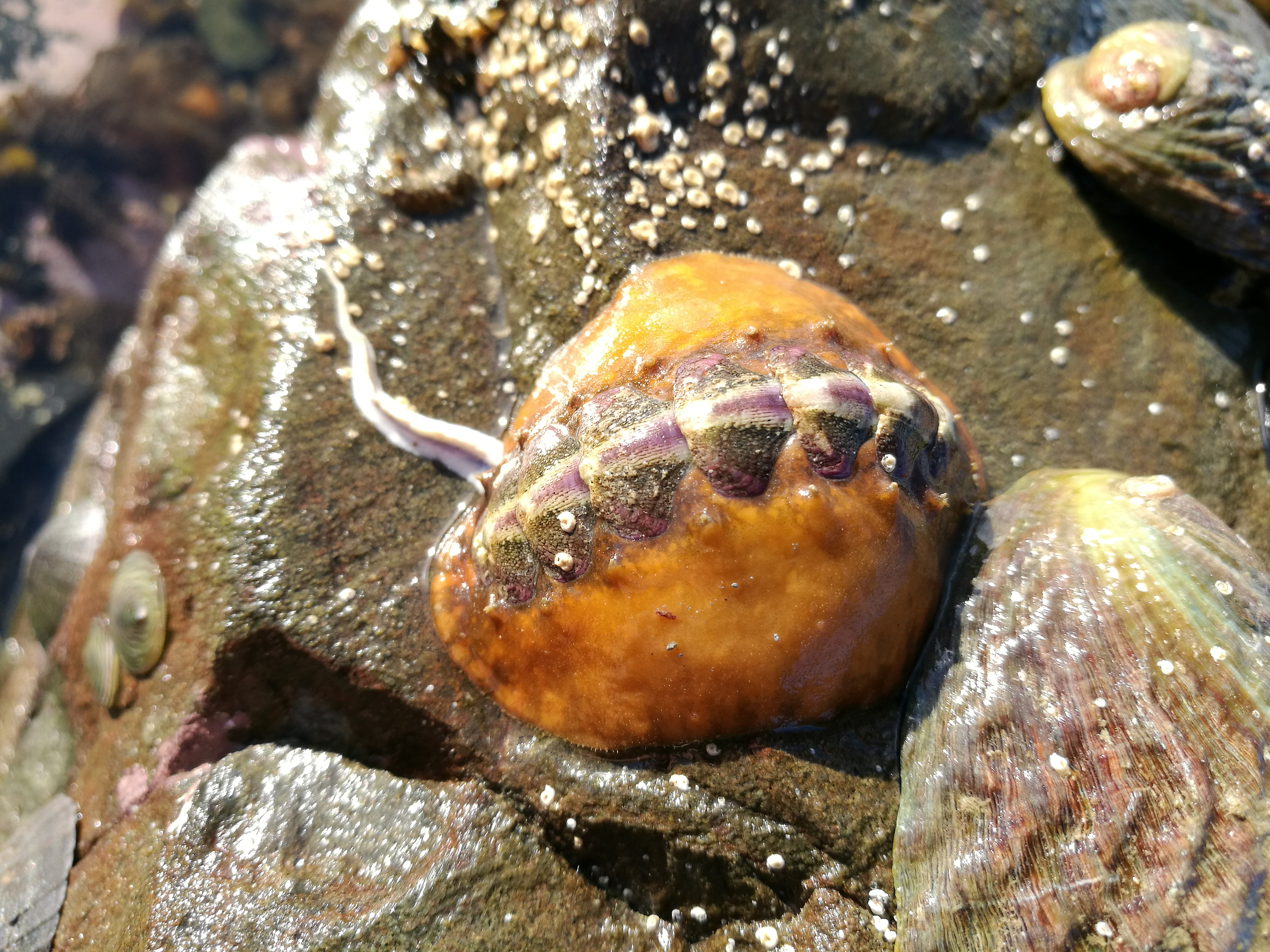

Scientific classification
- Kingdom: Animalia
- Phylum: Mollusca
- Class: Polyplacophora
- Order: Chitonida
- Family: Acanthochitonidae
- Genus: Notoplax
- Species: N. violacea

Binomial name
- Notoplax violacea (Quoy and Gaimard, 1835)

Synonyms
- Chiton violaceus Quoy and Gaimard, 1835; Chiton porphyreticus Reeve, 1847; Acanthochites violaceus Suter, 1913; Acanthochiton violaceus Morton & Miller 1968, 1973

= Notoplax violacea =

Species of mollusc

Notoplax violacea is a species of chiton in the family Acanthochitonidae, endemic to all coasts of New Zealand, where it is common in northern areas.

== Description ==
This notable chiton can grow up to 62mm long and is distinguished by a wide fleshy girdle that is orange in most individuals, sometimes covered in a greenish algal growth. The reduced valves are sculptured in purple patterns often with white markings, with pustules in lateral areas and five strong radial ribs on the head valve. The ventral underside is orange, a thin film covers the off-white mantle and is easily removed.

== Habitat ==
Found on rocky coasts, usually under the larger boulders encrusted in sessile animals such as bryozoans, small barnacles and ascidians. N. violacea preys on these and is assumed to be mainly carnivorous in its diet. Ranges from the mid-intertidal zone down to around 15 metres deep.
