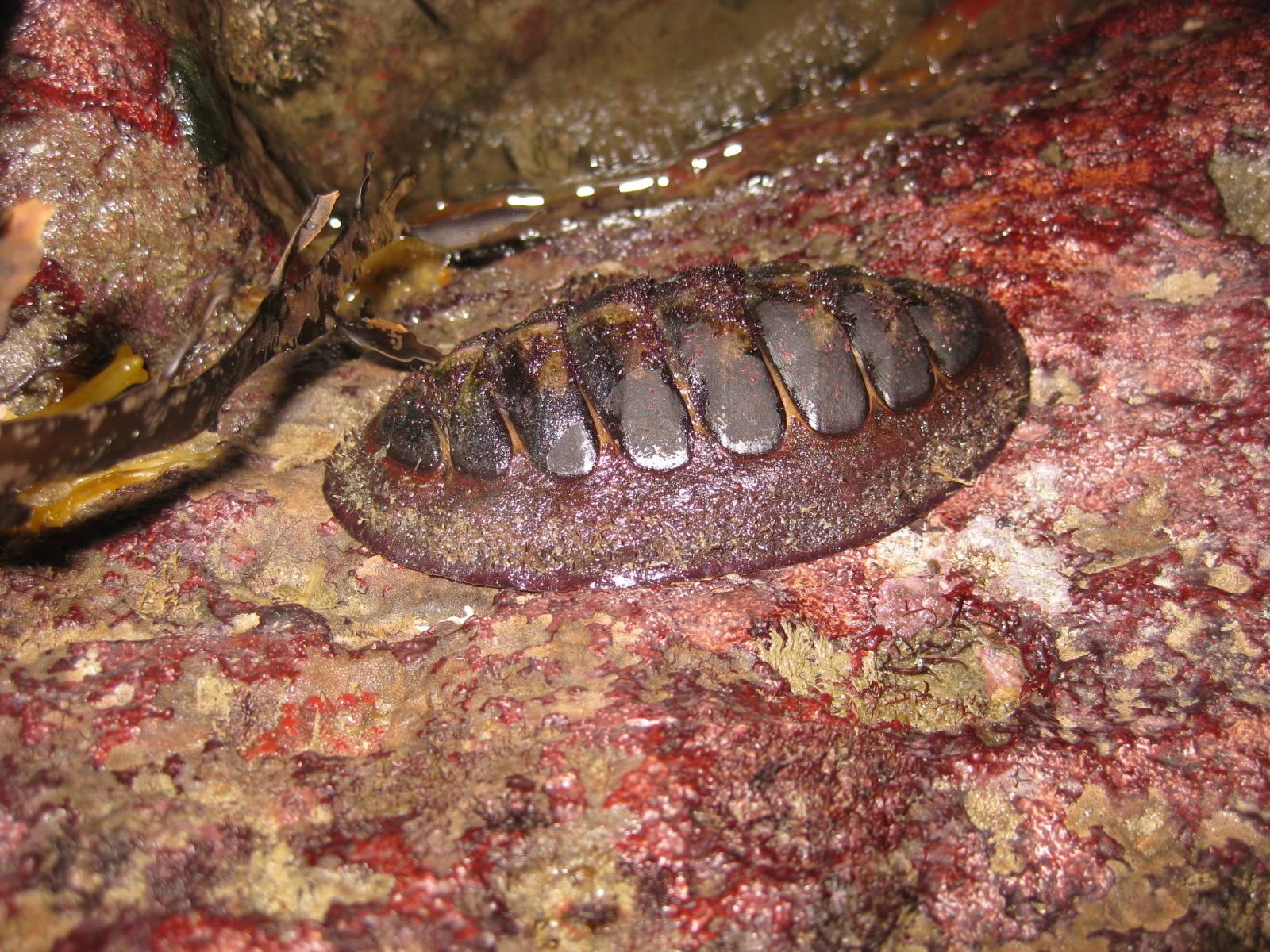

Scientific classification
- Kingdom: Animalia
- Phylum: Mollusca
- Class: Polyplacophora
- Order: Chitonida
- Family: Callochitonidae
- Genus: Eudoxochiton
- Species: E. nobilis

Binomial name
- Eudoxochiton nobilis (Gray, 1843)

Synonyms
- Acanthopleura nobilis Gray, 1843; Eudoxochiton huttoni Pilsbry, 1893

= Eudoxochiton =

Species of mollusc

Eudoxochiton nobilis, commonly called the noble chiton, is a large chiton of the family Callochitonidae. The Māori name is Rangitīra.

== Description and habitat ==
Found in New Zealand on open rock surfaces within kelp beds, on boulders or occasionally in rockpools. Adults are the largest chitons native to New Zealand at up to 110mm long, are oval shaped and surrounded by a leathery girdle covered in short bristles. Colouring varies from dark brown to olive-green, with the valves often encrusted or eroded, numerous shell eyes dotting the surfaces. Juveniles appear very flat compared to mature forms, with valves cryptically covered in mottled hues of pink, brown, green and yellow, often found under rocks or boulders resting in sand or gravel.

== Distribution ==
Endemic to New Zealand. Frequent from the low intertidal zone to 30m deep around the two main islands, Stewart Island, and the Chatham and Kermadec Islands.
