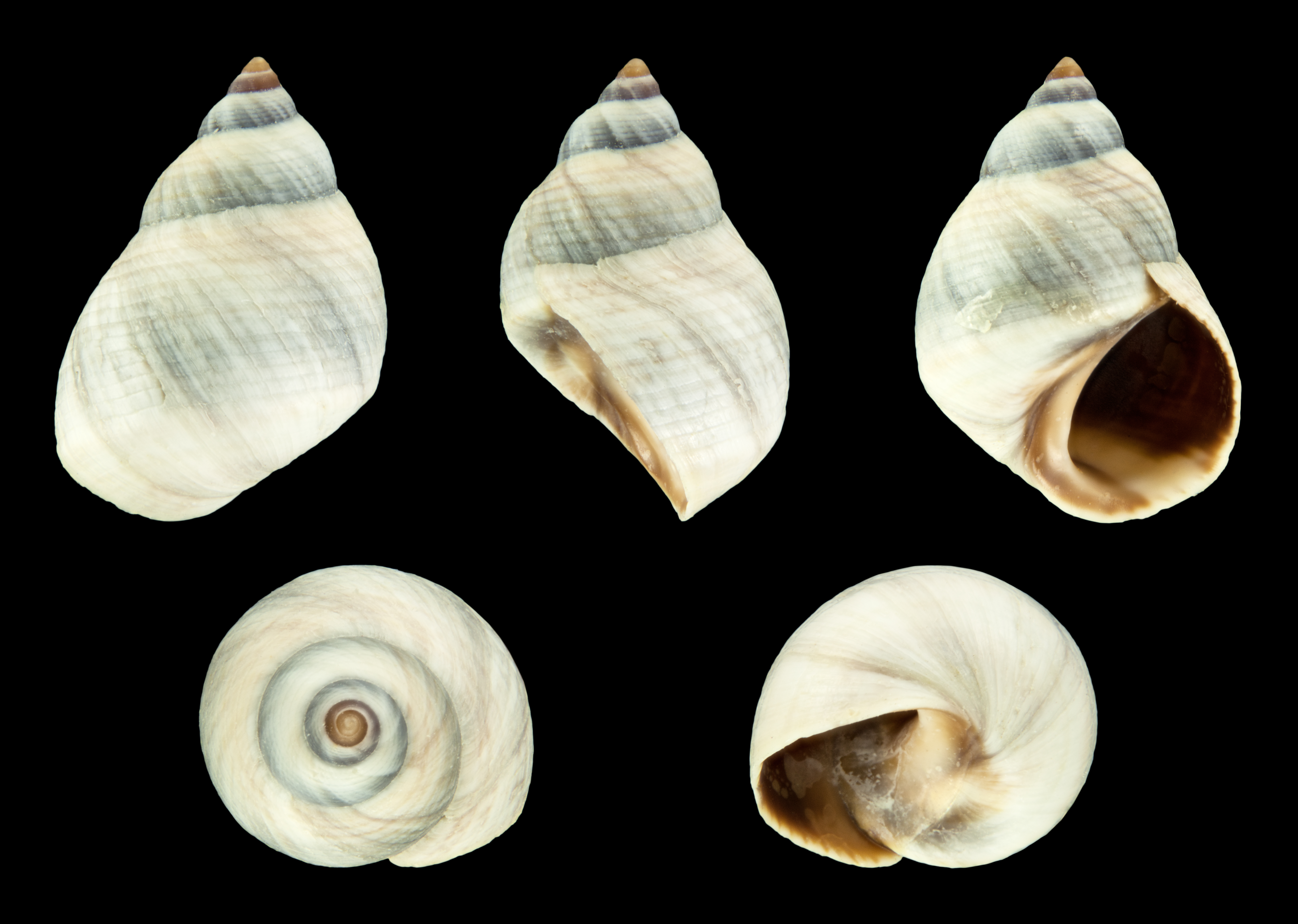

Scientific classification
- Kingdom: Animalia
- Phylum: Mollusca
- Class: Gastropoda
- Subclass: Caenogastropoda
- Order: Littorinimorpha
- Family: Littorinidae
- Genus: Austrolittorina
- Species: A. unifasciata

Binomial name
- Austrolittorina unifasciata (Gray, 1826)

Synonyms
- Litorina acuta Menke, 1843; Litorina diemensis Philippi, 1847; Littorina diemenensis Quoy & Gaimard, 1833; Littorina diemenensis var. pseudolaevis Nevill, 1885; Littorina mauritiana var. crassior Philippi, 1847; Littorina unifasciata Gray, 1826; Littorina (Austrolittorina) unifasciata unifasciata Rosewater, J. 1970; Melarapha diemenensis Iredale, T. & McMichael, D.F. 1962; Nodilittorina unifasciata (Gray, 1826)

= Austrolittorina unifasciata =

Species of gastropod

Austrolittorina unifasciata, common name the banded periwinkle, is a species of sea snail, a marine gastropod mollusk in the family Littorinidae, the winkles or periwinkles.

It is also known as the blue periwinkle.

== Description ==
The shell size varies between 10 mm (0.39 in) and 25 mm (0.98 in).

(Original description) The shell is ovate-conical and nearly smooth, featuring only a few concentric ridges and distant, scarcely impressed, very narrow grooves. The exterior is white or purplish-white in color. The whorls are rather convex, with the body whorl becoming slightly angular toward the front. The aperture is ovate, and the throat is colored purple or purplish-black, marked by a distinct, broad white spiral band situated just below the slight external keel. The inner lip is purple and is set before a deep concavity. The spire is acute and reaches half the total length of the shell.

== Distribution ==
This species is the only one of its genus found in Australia. It is distributed in the Coral Sea off Queensland, Australia and in the Indian Ocean off Western Australia. This common periwinkle also lives on the rocky shore of New Zealand. It is also commonly found in South Pacific Islands such as Norfolk Island.

== Ecology ==
This species of periwinkle lives in the splash zone and high intertidal zone, where it is found in clusters of individuals. The banded periwinkle grazes on lichen and algae. This small snail is eaten by crabs and birds.
