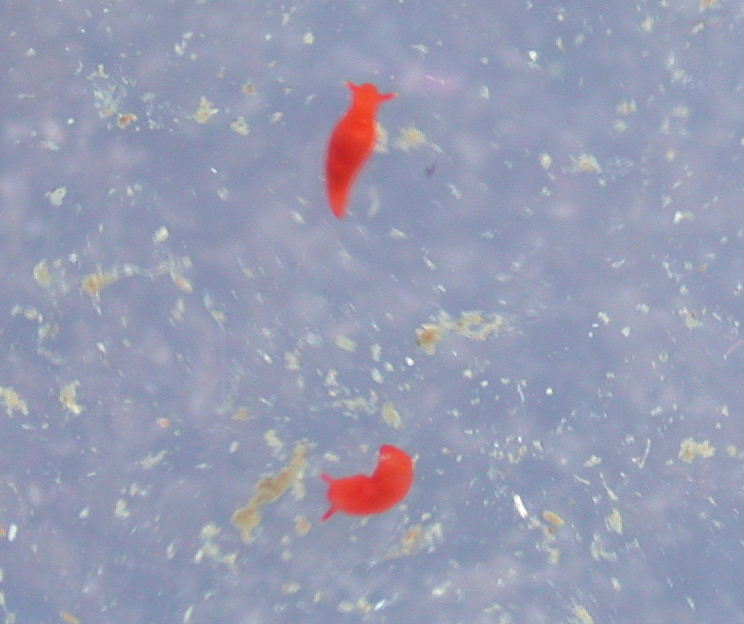
- Vayssierea elegans

Scientific classification
- Kingdom: Animalia
- Phylum: Mollusca
- Class: Gastropoda
- Order: Nudibranchia
- Superfamily: Polyceroidea
- Family: Okadaiidae; Baba, 1930

Synonyms
- Vayssiereidae Thiele, 1931

= Okadaiidae =

Family of gastropods

Okadaiidae is a family of sea slugs, dorid nudibranchs, marine gastropod mollusks in the superfamily Polyceroidea. This family is within the clade Euctenidiacea.

This family has no subfamilies.

== Genera ==
- Vayssierea (Risbec, 1928)
