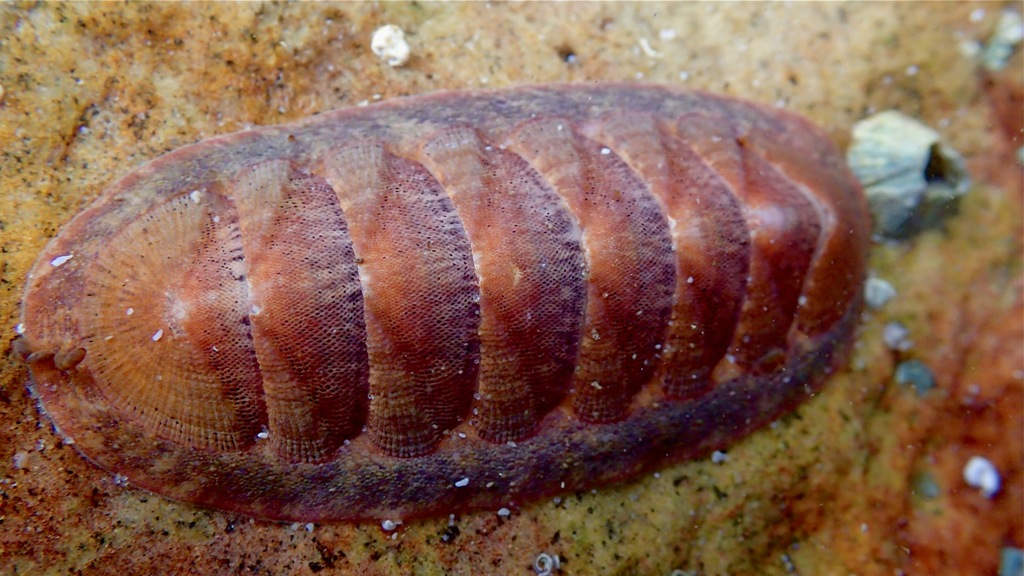
- Callochiton dentatus

Scientific classification
- Domain: Eukaryota
- Kingdom: Animalia
- Phylum: Mollusca
- Class: Polyplacophora
- Order: Chitonida
- Family: Callochitonidae; Plate, 1901

= Callochitonidae =

Family of molluscs

Callochitonidae is a family of chitons belonging to the order Chitonida.

== Genera ==
- Callochiton Gray, 1847
- Eudoxochiton Shuttleworth, 1853
- Leloupia Kaas & Van Belle, 1990
- Quaestiplax Iredale & Hull, 1929
- Vermichiton Kaas, 1991
