= Mollusc eye =

Visual organs of the phylum

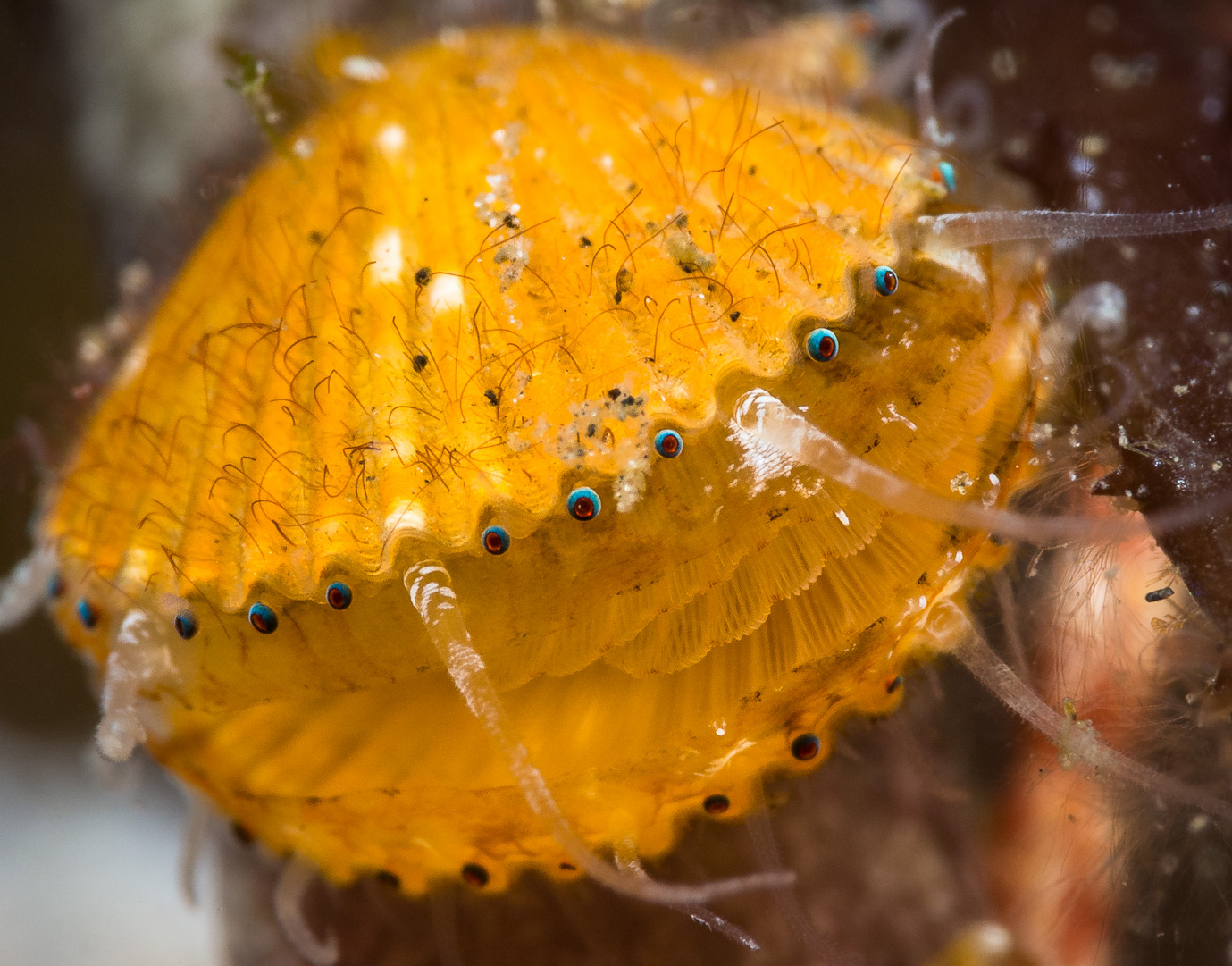
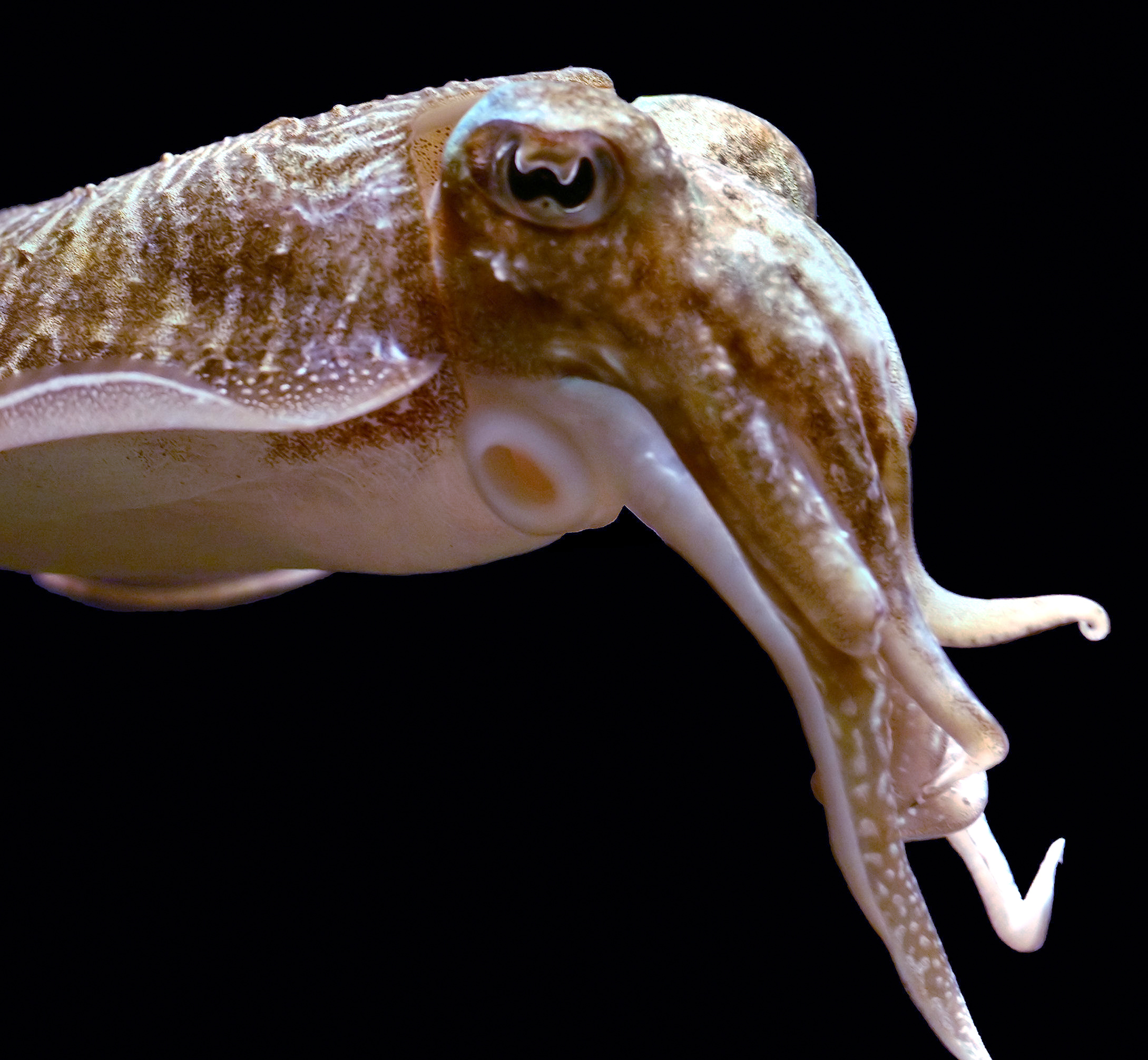
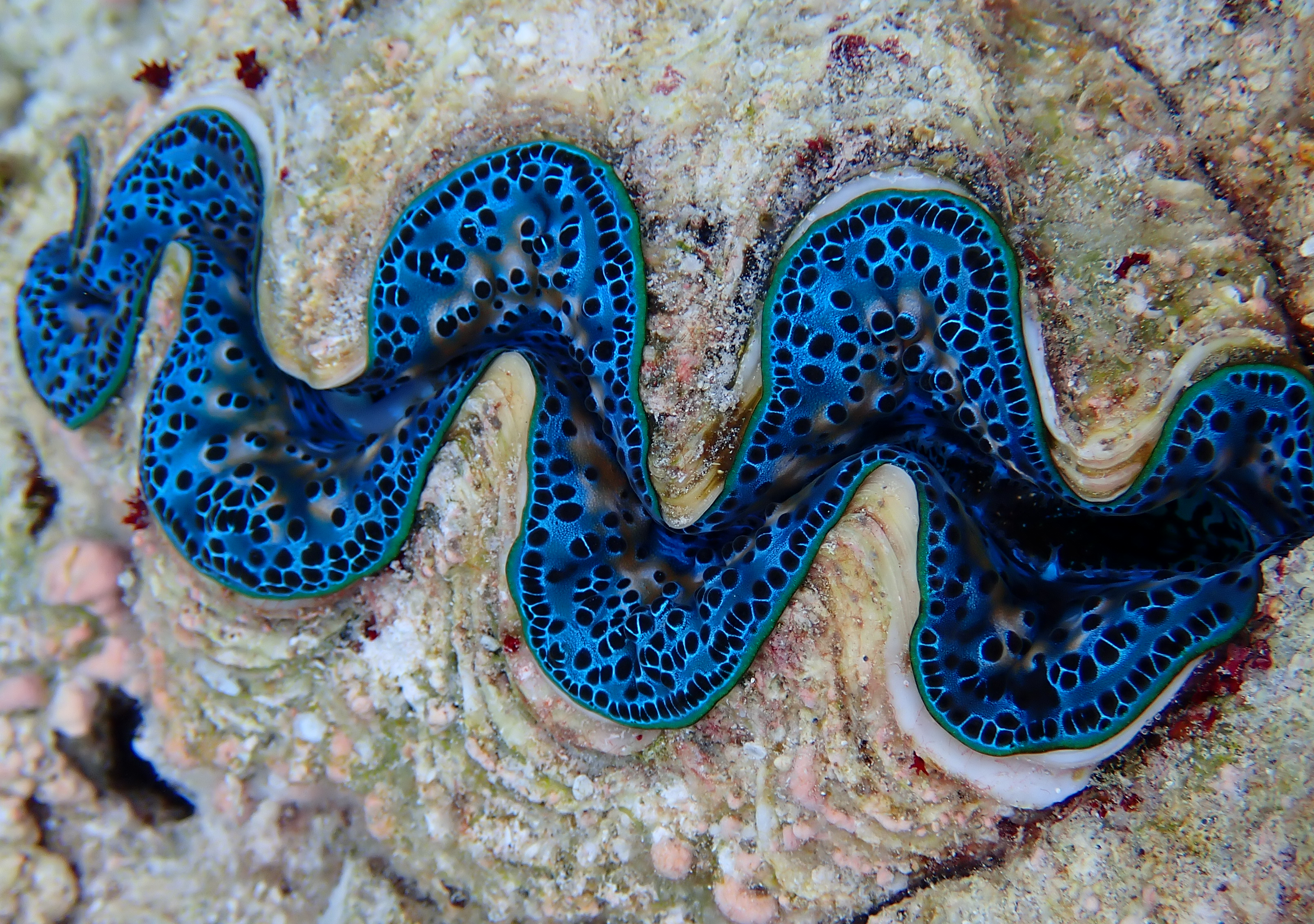
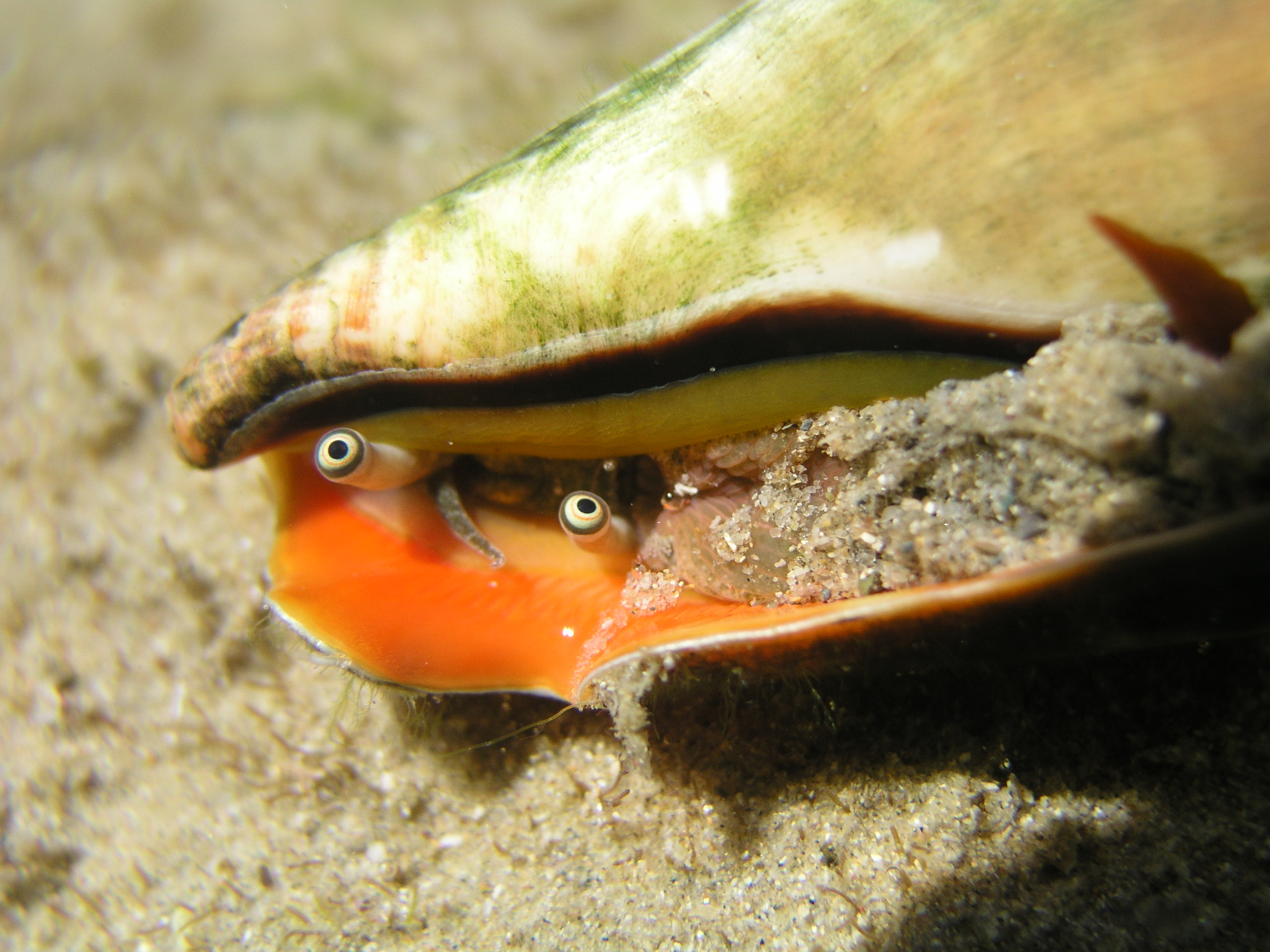
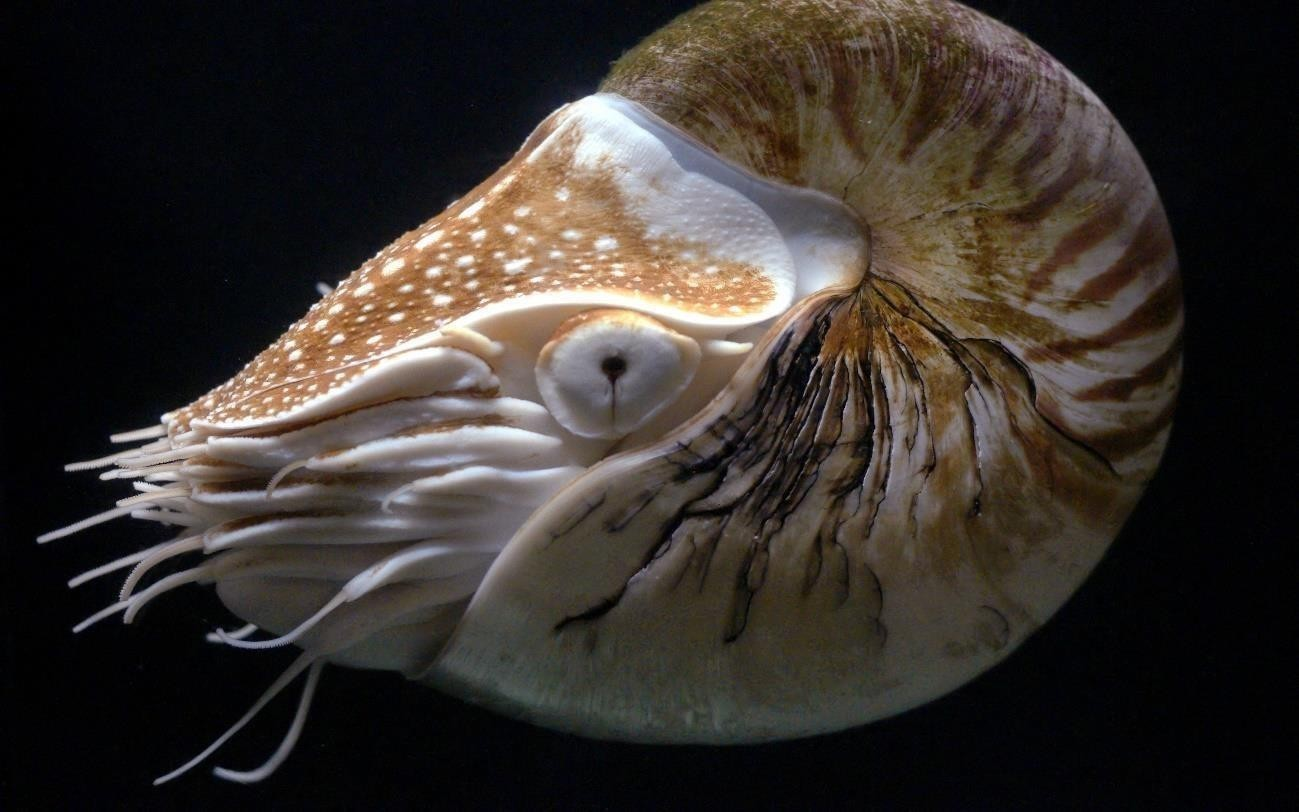
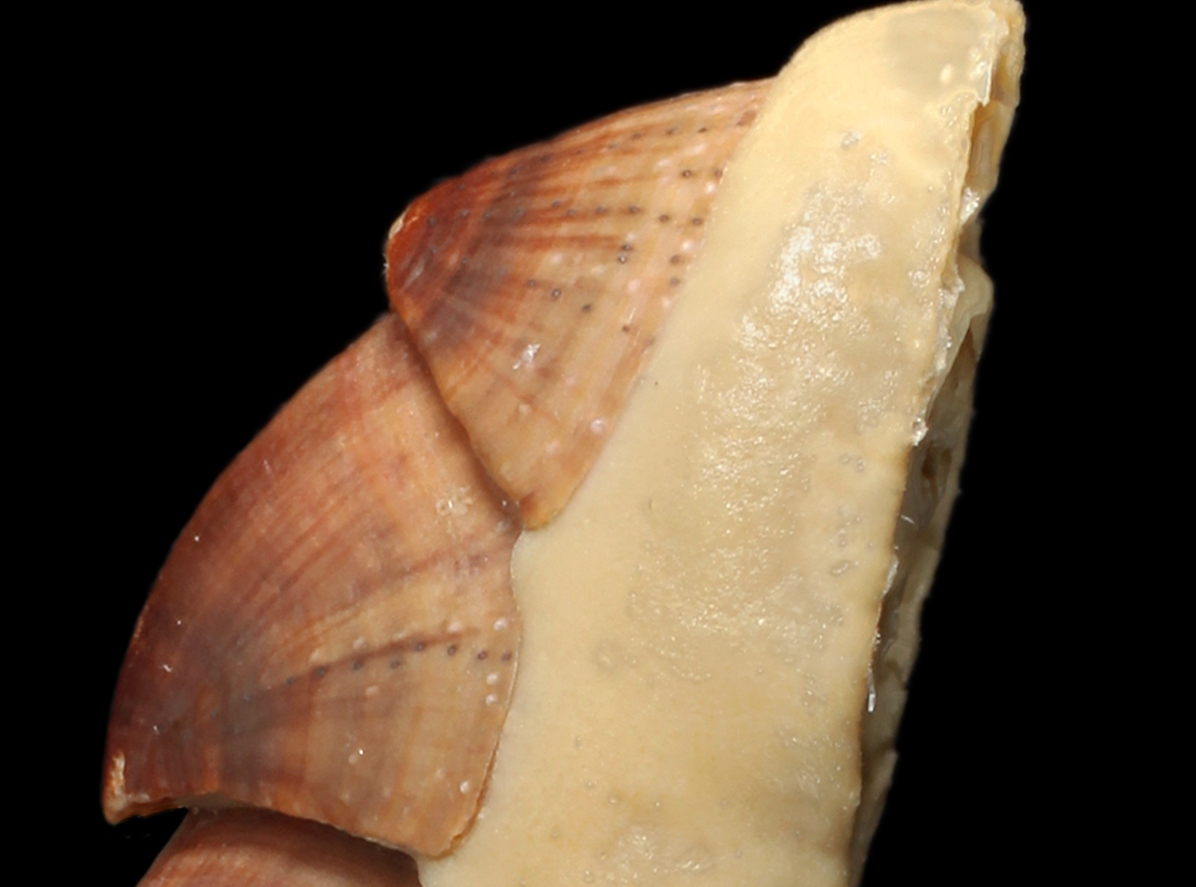
A variety of mollusc eyes. From left to right, top to bottom: mirror eyes on a scallop, cuttlefish eyes, giant clam eyespots, conch eyes, pinhole eye of a nautilus, chiton ocelli

The molluscs have the largest variety of eyes of any animal phylum, spanning a wide range of visual systems and morphologies. All molluscan eyes evolved independently of the vertebrate eye, and eyes have developed independently in different branches of Mollusca multiple times. Because of this the eyes of molluscs feature many designs and structures unique to their taxa.

There are between seven and eleven distinct eye types in molluscs. Types of eyes found in Mollusca range from the complex camera-type eyes found in cephalopods to the simple light-detecting cup eyes found in many bivalves. Additionally, some molluscs have evolved eyes that utilise very different mechanisms than the vertebrate eye. For example, the eyes of scallops contain mirrors that perform the same function as a vertebrate lens, and the eyes of the nautilus have no lens at all and provide visual information via the camera obscura effect. Other kinds of eyes present in molluscs include compound eyes (arc clams), aesthetes (chitons), and the stalked eyes of some gastropods.

== Overview ==
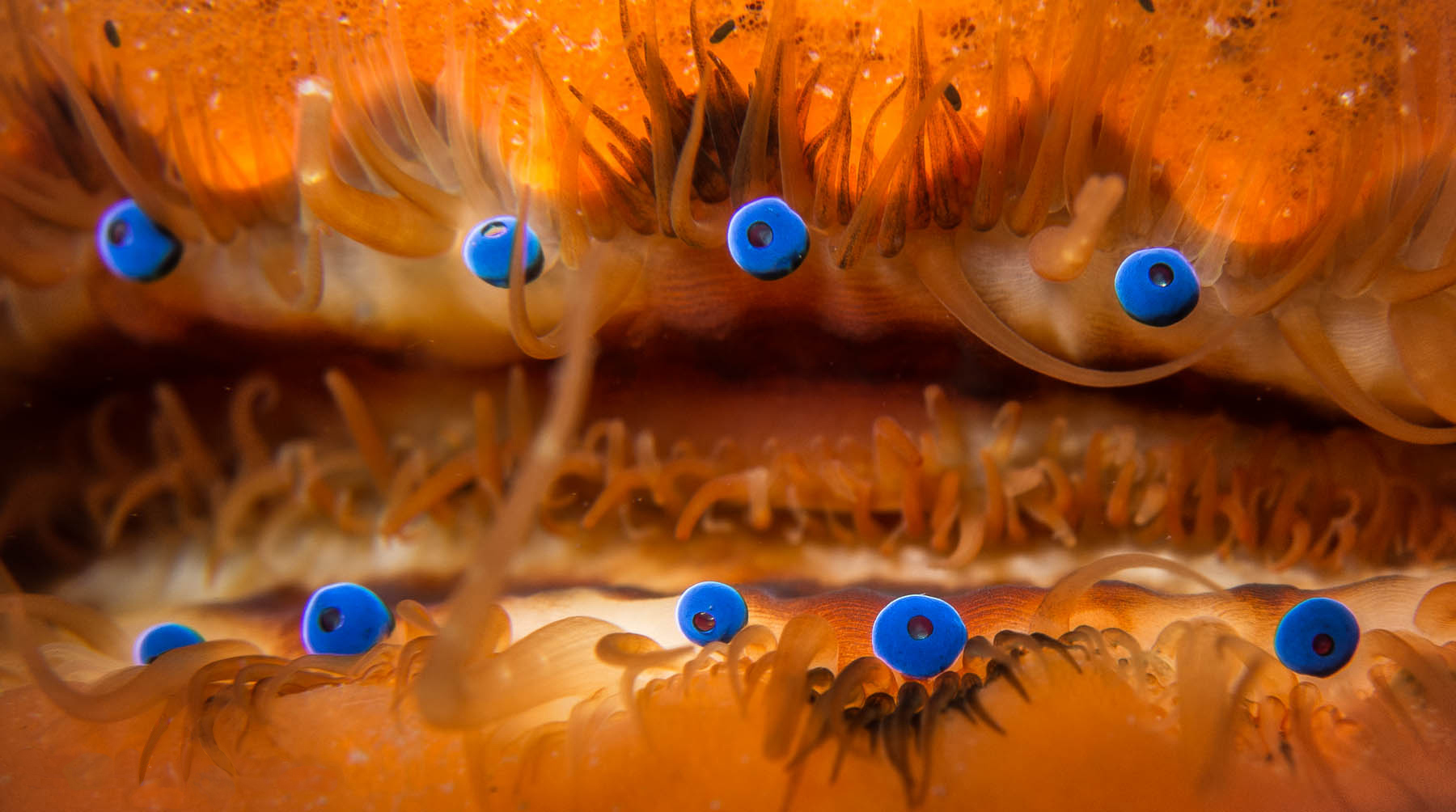
Mirror eyes of a scallop.

Many species of molluscs are uncephalised and do not have clear head regions in which to locate the eyes. Such molluscs may have numerous eyes that are located on other body structures. Some bivalves, such as scallops, have a multitude of eyes located on the external surface of their mantle, referred to as pallial eyes. Chitons have a dispersed network of tiny eyes over the surface of their shell plates which may act together as a compound eye. Cephalised molluscs (gastropods and cephalopods) have paired eyes located on the head. Many gastropods have stalked eyes, allowing the eye to be retracted into the stalk in the presence of danger.

Eyes are entirely absent from some groups of molluscs such as Monoplacophora, Aplacophora and Scaphapoda (tusk shells). Although species within Aplacophora are eyeless, they may have evolved from eyed animals. Some molluscs have eyes in the larval stage that are not present in the adult stage. As well as varying in complexity, the eyes of molluscs span a huge range in size; they may be from 20 μm (0.0008 in) to 27 cm (11 in) across.

== Cephalopod eyes ==
With the exception of the nautilus, cephalopods such as octopus, squid, and cuttlefish have complex eyes comparable to those of vertebrates. Despite similarities in their form, cephalopods evolved their complex eyes independently from vertebrates with any similarities being as a result of convergent evolution.

Left: a vertebrate eye with nerve fibres passing over the retina. Right: a cephalopod eye with nerve fibres passing behind the retina.

The eyes of cephalopods lack the blind spot present in vertebrate eyes. This is because nerve fibres in the vertebrate eye pass over the retina and block light where they pass through the back of the eye, causing the blind spot. In cephalopod eyes the nerve fibres pass under the retina and do not prevent light from hitting the retina.

Cephalopod eyes differ from vertebrate eyes in that they are able to perceive polarised light. Many cephalopods are also able to utilise the colour changing properties of their skin to produce polarised skin patterns. It is possible that cephalopods can communicate using polarised light signals while still remaining camouflaged to predators that are not able to perceive polarised light.

There is evidence that the skin of cephalopods may be intrinsically sensitive to light in a similar way to the mantle of bivalves (see below). Chromataphores in the skin of octopus expand when exposed to light even when the skin is severed from the rest of the octopus, suggesting that octopus skin can detect light independently of the eyes.

=== Squid ===
==== Giant & colossal squid ====
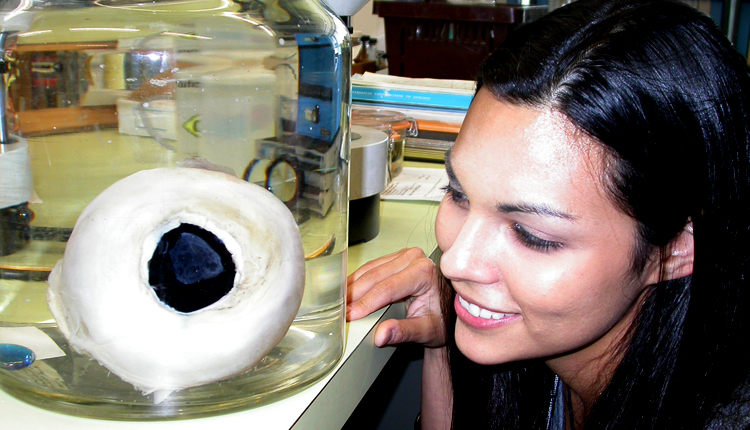
Preserved eye from a giant squid

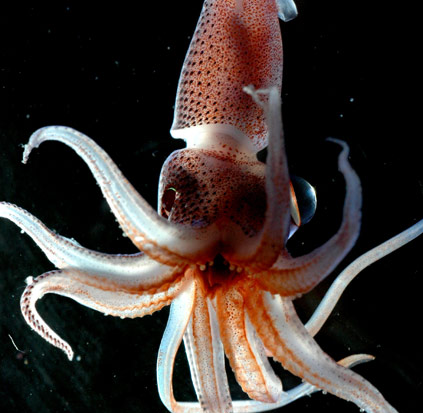
Cockeyed squid with asymmetrical eyes

The largest eyes in the animal kingdom belong to the giant and colossal squids, which have been recorded reaching up to 270mm in diameter, making them significantly larger than any other animal eye. These massive eyes may be used by the squid to detect the presence of predators in its deep sea habitat, where there is very little light and it is vulnerable to ambush by sperm whales. Large animals moving at speed through a deep sea habitat will trigger a bioluminescent response in the planktonic organisms they disturb. The squid may utilise its large eyes to detect this bioluminescence from a distance and prepare an appropriate evasive response.

==== Cockeyed squid ====
The deep-sea cockeyed squids have developed an unusual eye arrangement in which the left eye is significantly larger than the right and orientated upwards, while the right eye is smaller and downward orientated. The larger eye has a tubular shape, and sometimes contains different pigmentation than the left. This may be because the two eyes have adapted to different tasks- the upward facing eye is for observing objects silhouetted against the dim sunlight visible from the deep ocean, while the smaller eye is better suited to detect bioluminescent organisms beneath the squid. Juvenile cockeyed squids have symmetrical eyes that develop asymmetry as the squid matures.

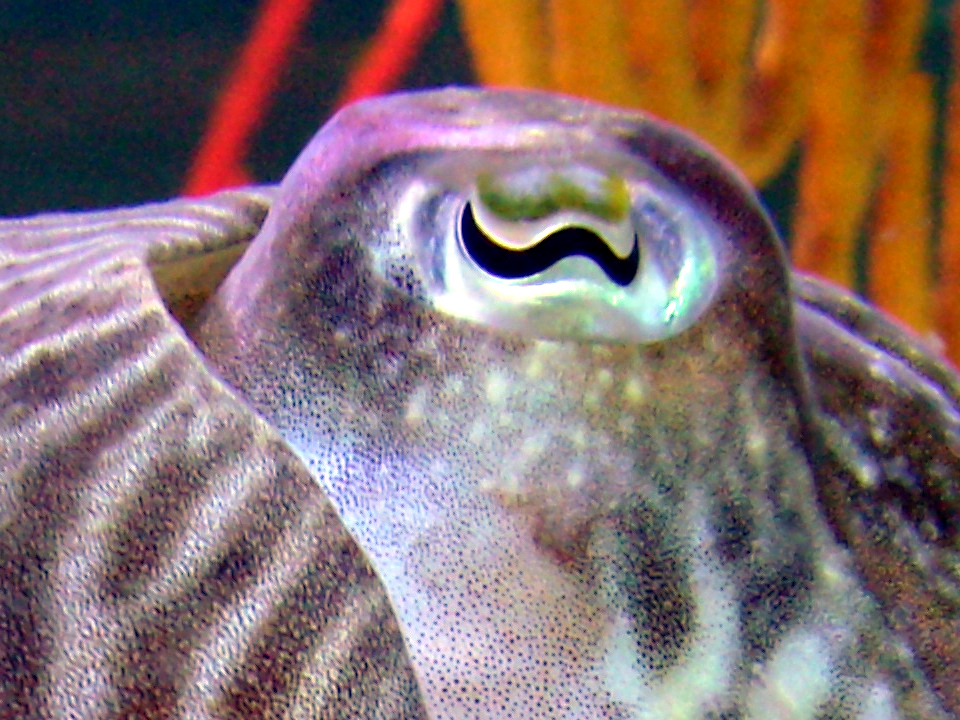
Cuttlefish eye, showing W-shaped pupil

=== Cuttlefish ===
Cuttlefish eyes have a distinctive W-shaped pupil that expands into a circle when dilated. The W-shape of the pupil may aid the cuttlefish to see in its shallow water habitat by balancing out the bright light from the ocean surface and the dimmer light underneath the water. Cuttlefish have been demonstrated to be colourblind.

=== Nautilus ===
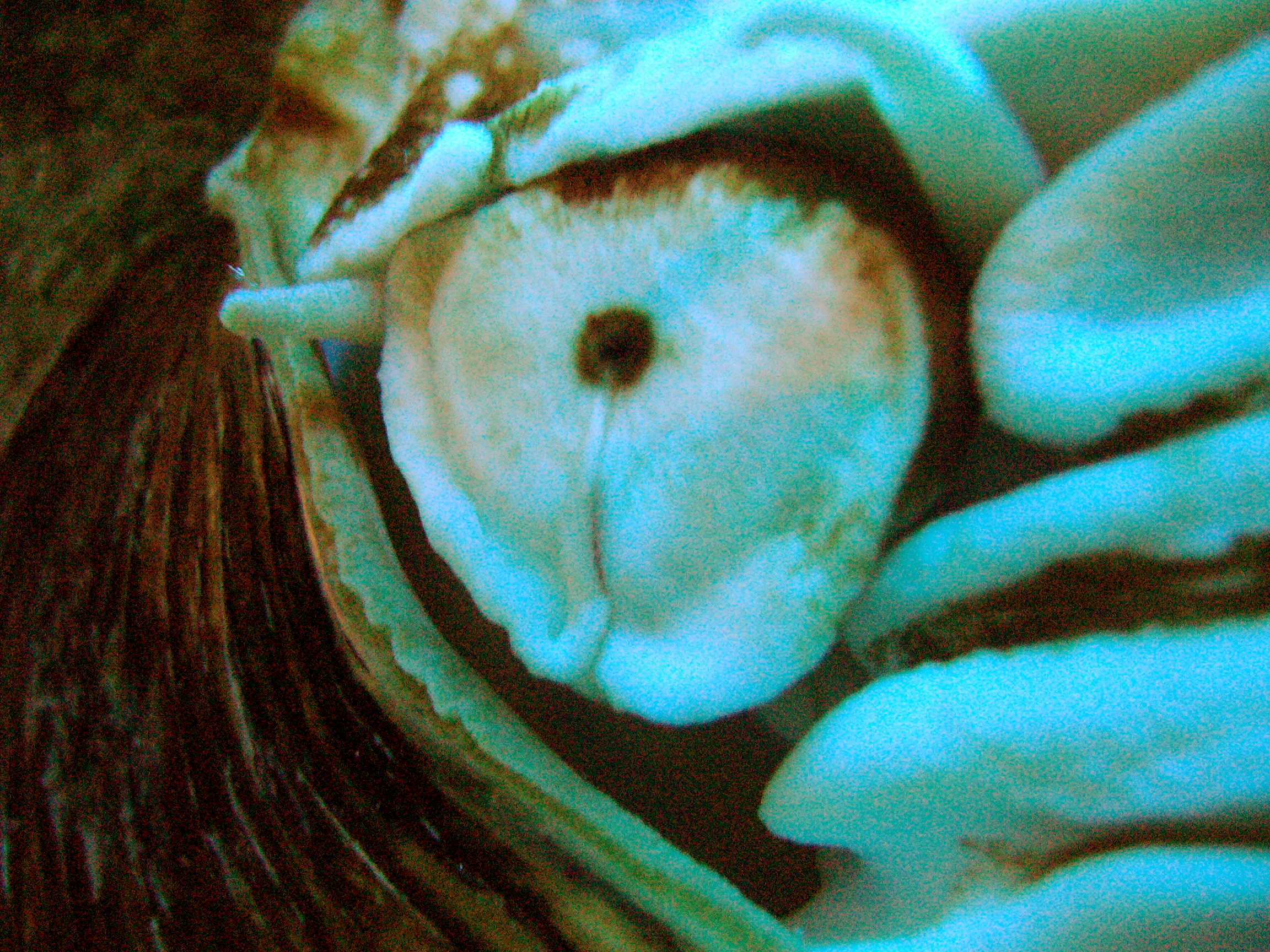
The pinhole eye of a Nautilus pompilius

Nautilus eyes lack a lens and cornea, and function akin to a pinhole camera. The pupil of a nautilus eye is a small hole approximately 10mm away from the retina. Light passes through the aperture and projects an inverted image on to the retina at the back of the eye. The nautilus can adjust the size of the pupil to sharpen or brighten the image. The eye is open to the external environment and is filled with seawater.

== Gastropod eyes ==
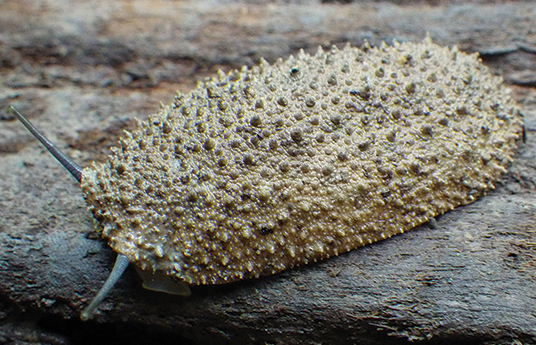
Some of the dorsal papillae (spines) on Onchidium melakense contain dorsal eyes

Most gastropods (slugs and snails) have a pair of eyes located at the head. Gastropods typically have complex eyes with a lens, but others have simpler pit eyes without lenses.

A significant variety of eye types exists within Gastropoda. Eyes may be mounted on stalks or at the tip of retractable tentacles- some species have eyes at the base of cephalic tentacles, and the genus Onchidium has both stalk eyes and functional dorsal eyes located on the back. Abalone have eyes similar to the pinhole eyes found in giant clams and nautilus.

A number of pulmonate gastropod species have double eyes. In these species each eye has a smaller accessory retina located next to the primary eye. In some species, the accessory retina may also be equipped with a lens. The function of this secondary eye is not well understood.

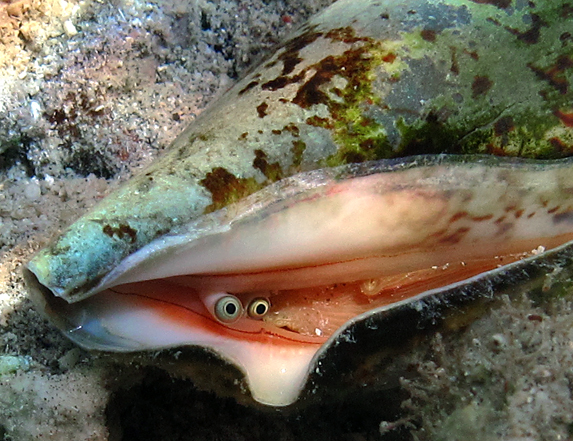
Eyes of a Strombus decorus extending from its shell.

=== Conchs ===
Conchs have unusually complex eyes in comparison to other gastropods. These camera-type eyes provide them with high-resolution spatial vision that may be important in evading predation. Conchs have an anatomical feature in their shell called a stromboid notch that allows the stalked eyes of the conch to view their surroundings while the body is withdrawn into the shell.

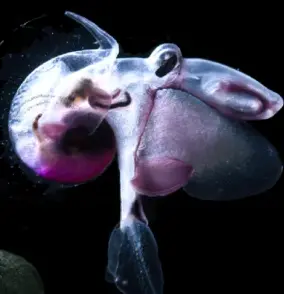
Oxygyrus inflatus showing typical narrow heteropod retina

=== Heteropods ===
Heteropods are pelagic marine snails with large, complex eyes similar in design to the eyes of fish. These eyes have a spherical lens and a thin, ribbon-like retina that provides only a very narrow strip of vision at any given time. The heteropod Atlanta peronii has been shown to compensate for this visual limitation by sweeping the retina up and down inside the eye with a repetitive scanning motion to expand their field of view.

== Bivalve eyes ==
Eyes have evolved independently at least 5 times within pteriomorphian bivalves. Bivalves are not cephalised and do not have a distinct head- when present, eyes are located on soft, exposed parts of their body, such as where the mantle meets the shell.

Although many bivalves have evolved sophisticated eyes, there is no evidence that any bivalve can perceive an image. Bivalves have not been shown to have any structure (such as an optic lobe) capable of synthesising visual information to create a visual reconstruction of its environment. Research on arc clams has suggested the eyes instead function as an "alarm" that can sense motion and trigger the animal to close its shell in response to potential danger.

All bivalves, including those without eyes, exhibit a "shadow response" when a shadow moves over them. The shadow response is defensive and typically involves withdrawal into a burrow or shell. Eyeless bivalves are able to perform the shadow response because bivalve mantle tissue itself is photoreceptive.

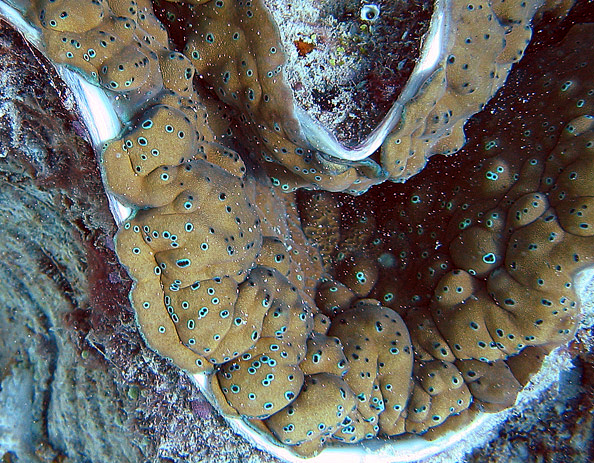
Eyes visible as dark spots on the mantle of a giant clam

=== Cardiidae ===
Cockles have eyes in the form of cups filled with photoreceptor cells lining their mantle.

In Tridacna (the giant clams), these eyes number in the thousands, and have developed a pinhole structure comparable to the eyes of the nautilus. Tridacna are known to have three types of receptor cells- blue, green, and ultraviolet.

=== Oysters ===
Most Ostreoidea lack eyes as adults, but some hammer oysters and Isognomonidae species have clustered photoreceptor cells on their outer mantle fold. Larval oysters have light sensitive eyespots that degenerate after metamorphosis.

=== Arc clams ===
Arc clams have a multitude of compound eyes arranged on the outer mantle fold. These eyes contain ommatidia and are similar in structure to arthropod eyes, although they evolved independently. Arc clams also have many hundreds of simple cup eyes in addition to their compound eyes.

=== Scallops ===
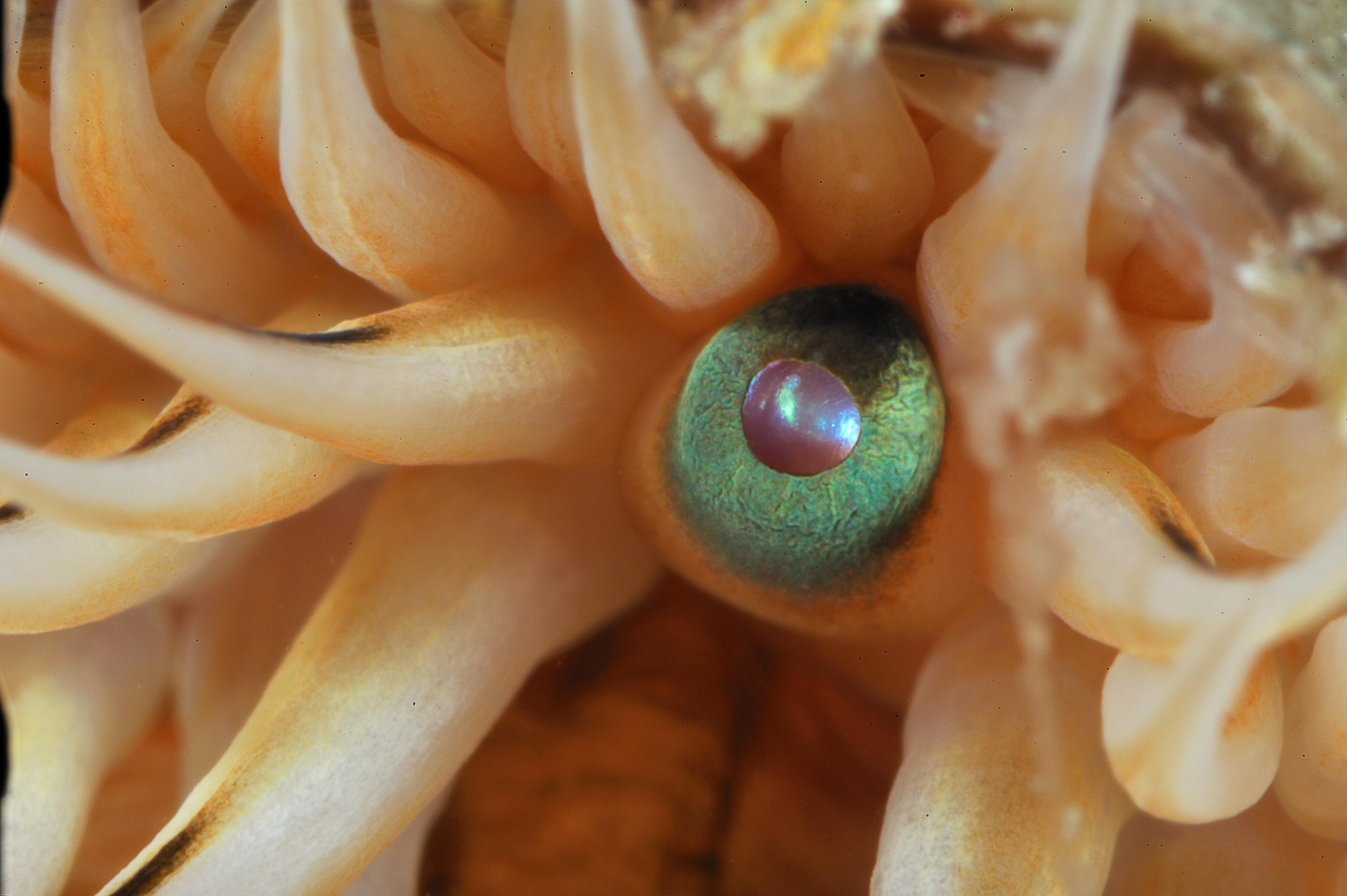
The reflective surface of the argentea is visible through the lens of this Pecten maximus eye

Scallops can have up to 200 pallial eyes arranged along the exposed surface of the mantle. These eyes have only an insubstantial jelly-like lens and make use of a concave mirror called the argentea to reflect an image onto the retina. The argentea lines the back of the eye and reflects light back into the retina, which sits between the lens and the argentea. Because the argentea sits behind the retina, unfocused light must pass through the retina and hit the argentea, where it is then focused and reflected back into the retina to form an image.

== Chiton eyes ==
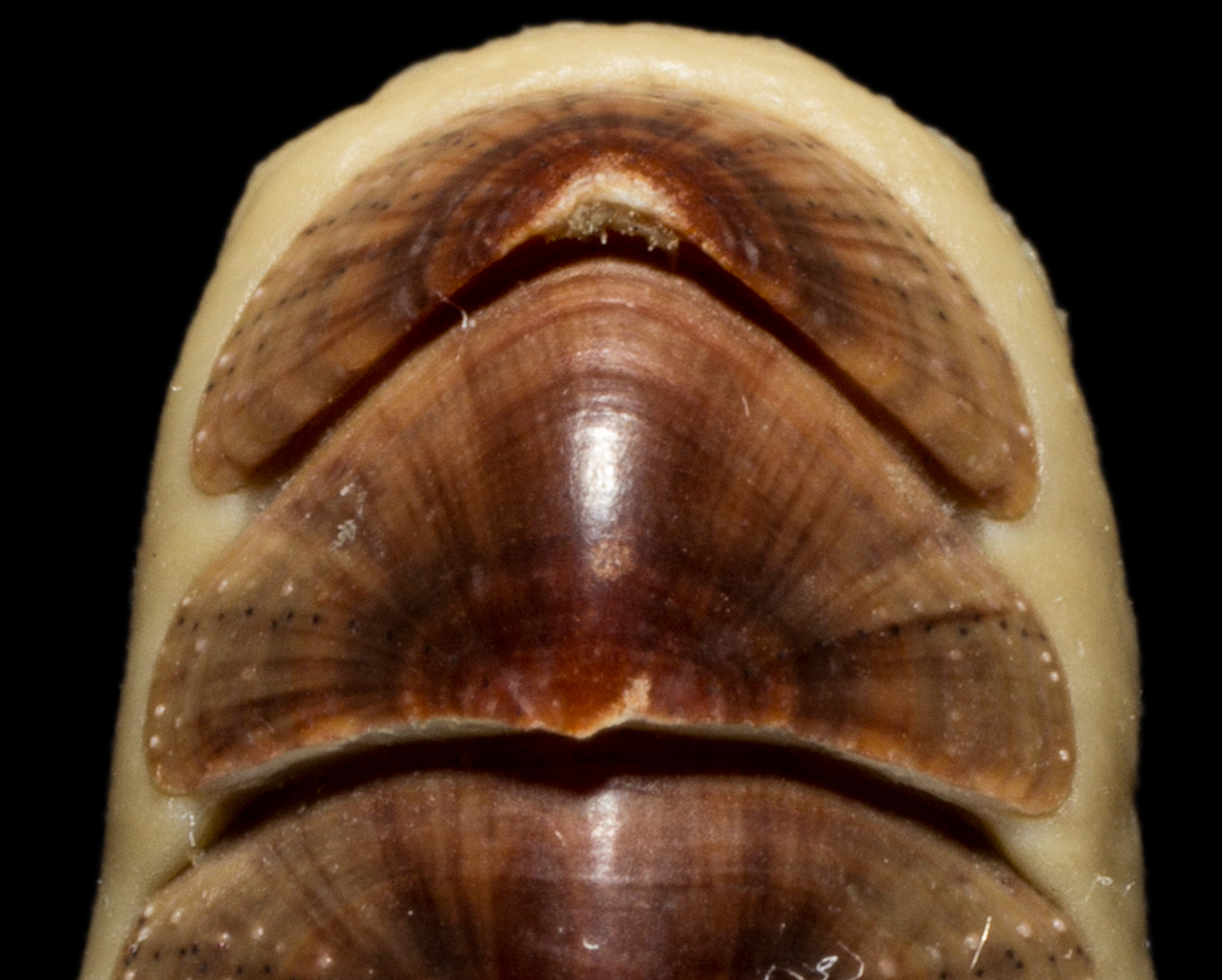
Ocelli of Tonicia lebruni, visible as dark spots on the dorsal plates.

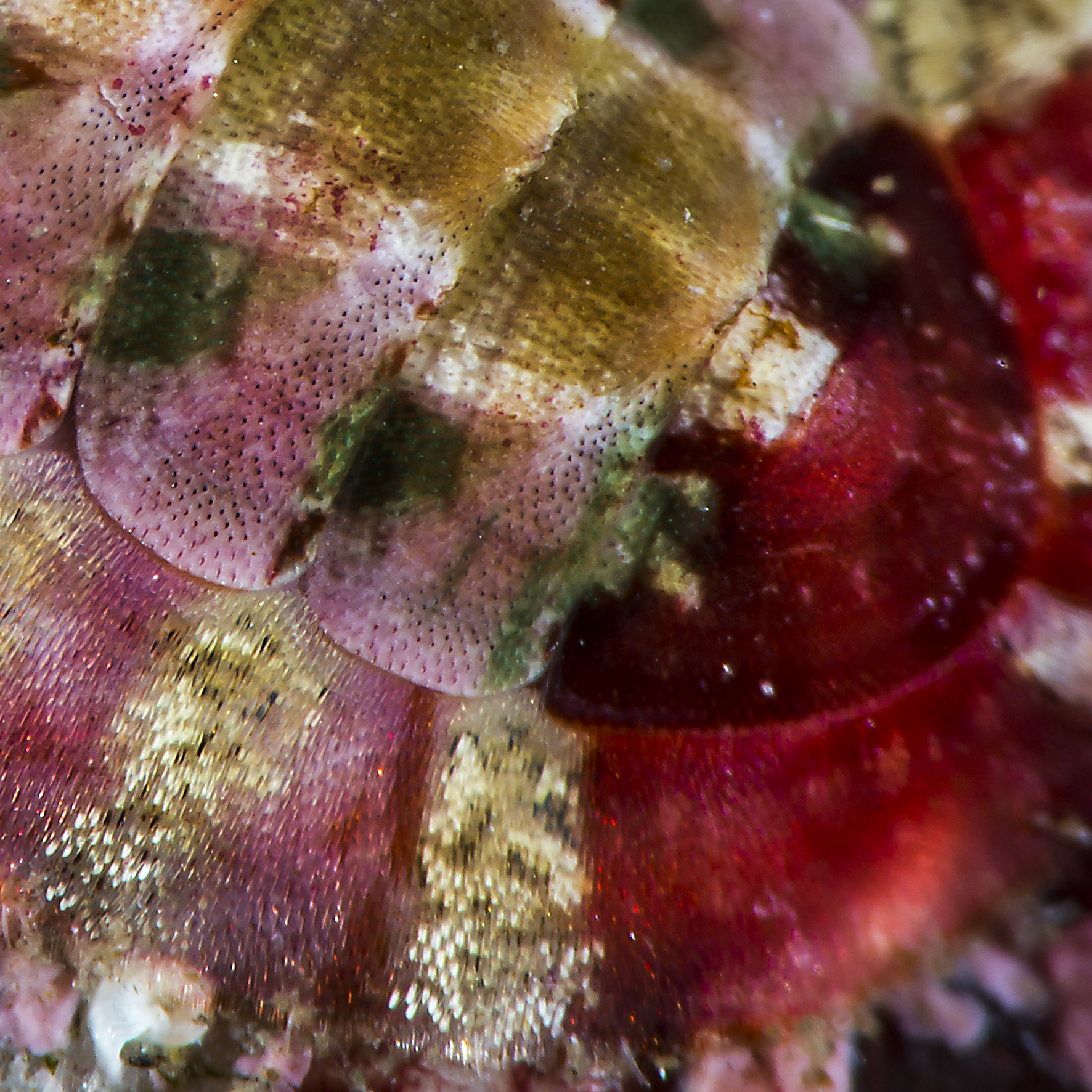
Eyespots (black spots) on the valves of Callochiton septemvalvis

The dorsal shell plates of chitons are covered with a multitude of small, photosensitive organs called aesthetes. These aesthetes are channels filled with unpigmented photoreceptive sensory cells embedded into the shell. It is possible that these aesthetes may work in unison as a giant compound eye like those found in arthropods.

Some species in the families Schizochitonidae and Chitonidae have modified aesthetes called ocelli with functional lenses made of aragonite, the same material that makes up a chiton's dorsal plates. Chitons are the only animal known to produce aragonite lenses. Like bivalves, chitons are uncephalised, and ocelli are present over the entire body of the chiton, although they tend to be most concentrated at the anterior plate. Chiton ocelli are approximately 65–80 μm wide and consist of a cornea and lens suspended by rhabdoms over a pit retina. These ocelli are able to form images and provide the chiton with spatial vision. Ocelli are functional in both water and air.

The fossil record shows that chitons with ocelli began to appear less than then 10 million years ago, making chiton ocelli one of the most recent kinds of animal eyes to evolve.

Other species of chitons lack ocelli but have developed "eyespots" or interpigmental aesthetes. These are simpler structures than the ocelli, consisting of a modified aesthete without a lens filled with pigmented cells.

== Gallery ==
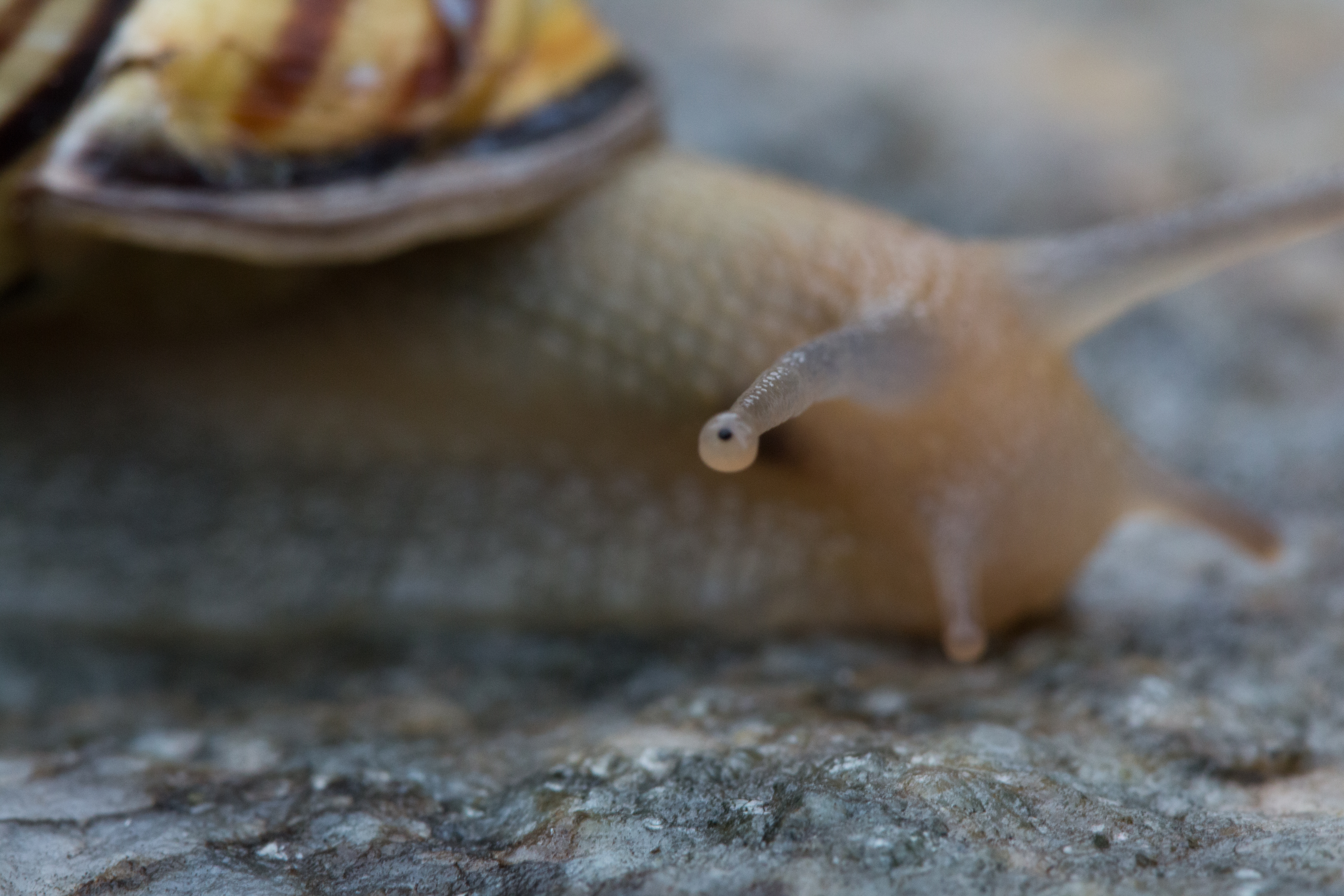
Eye of a pulmonate snail

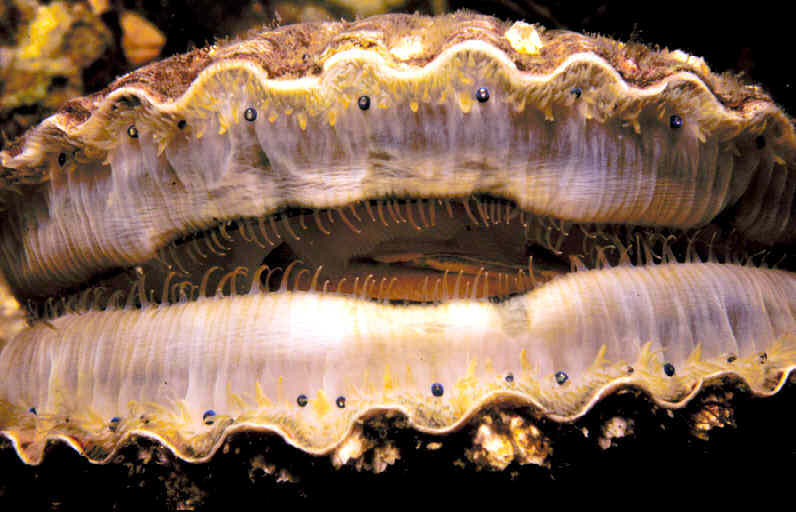
Scallops can have up to 200 eyes

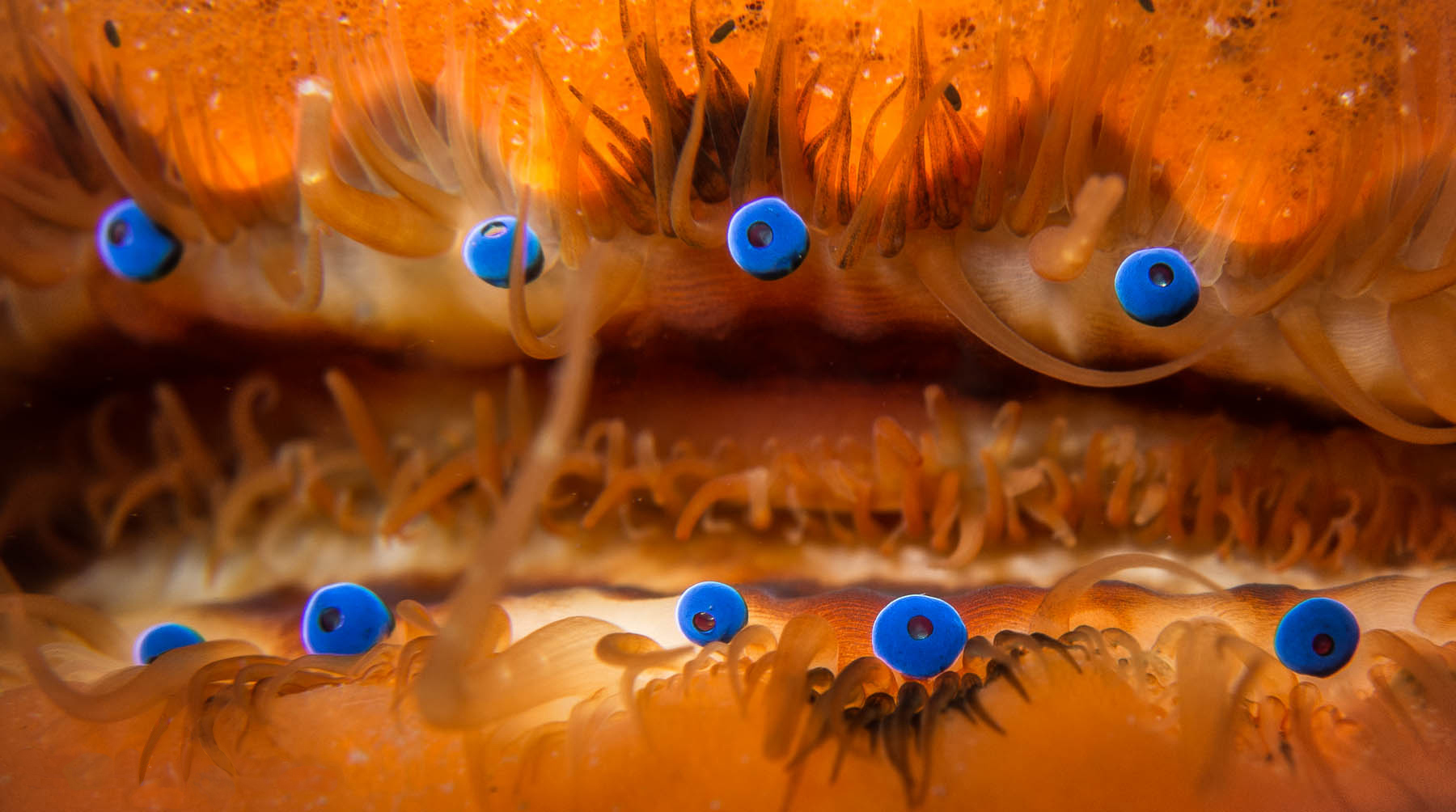
Scallop eyes

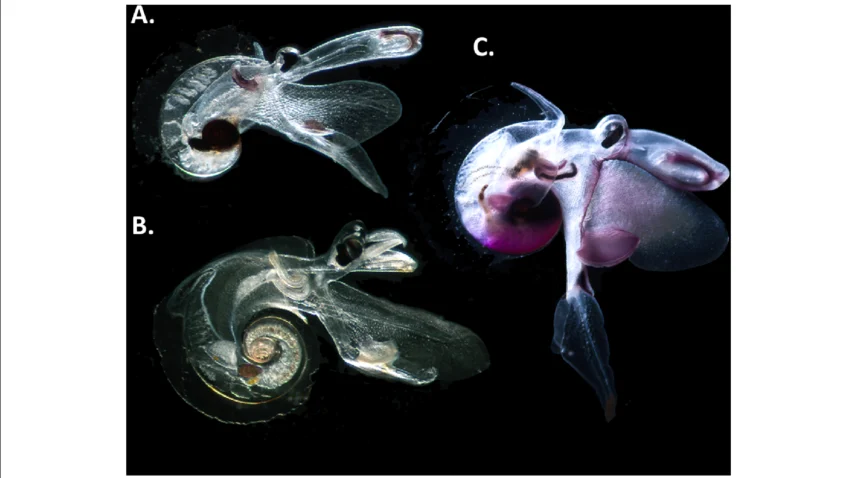
Heteropods showing the distinctive shape of the retina

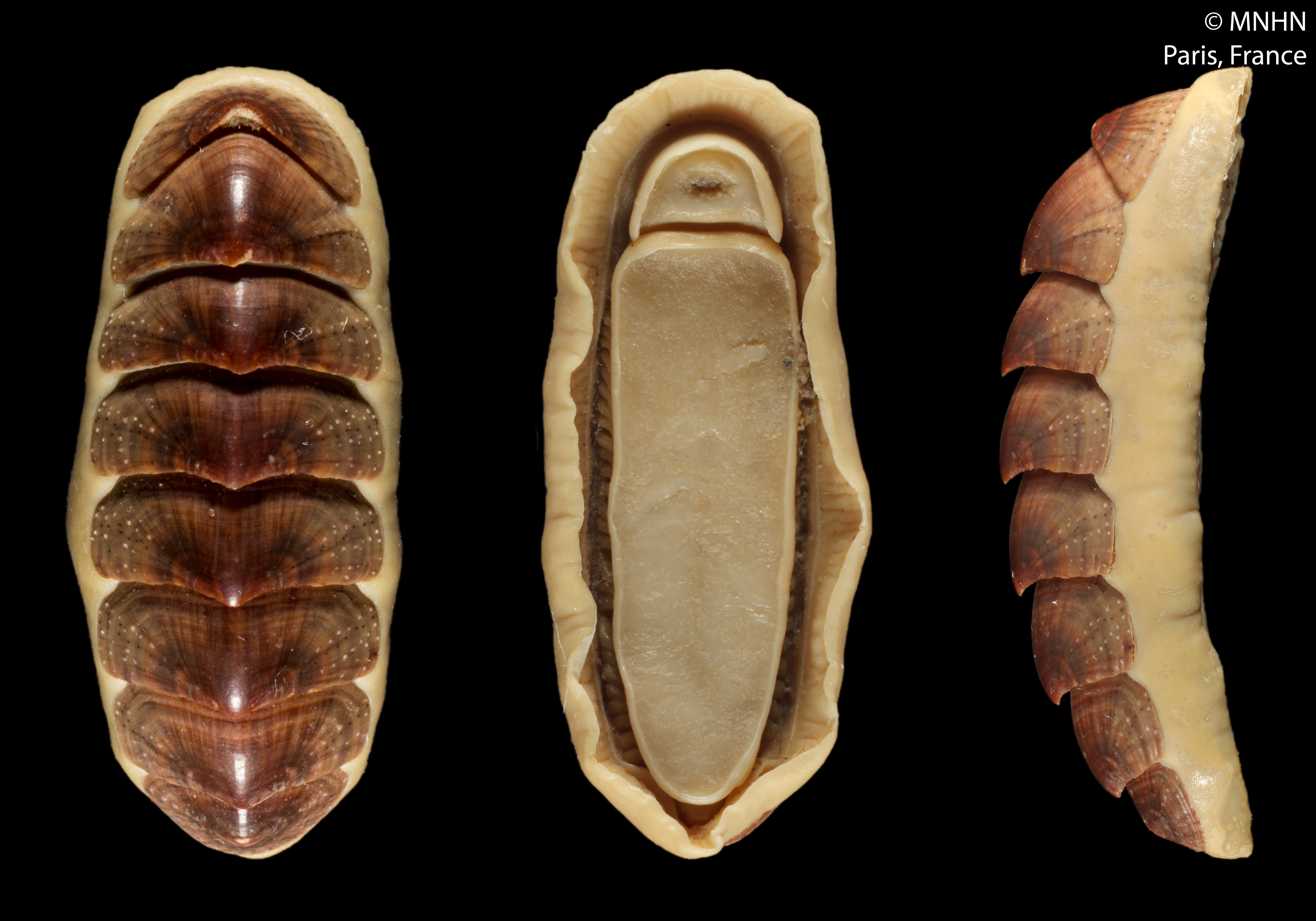
a chiton, Tonicia lebruni with ocelli visible on the dorsal plates

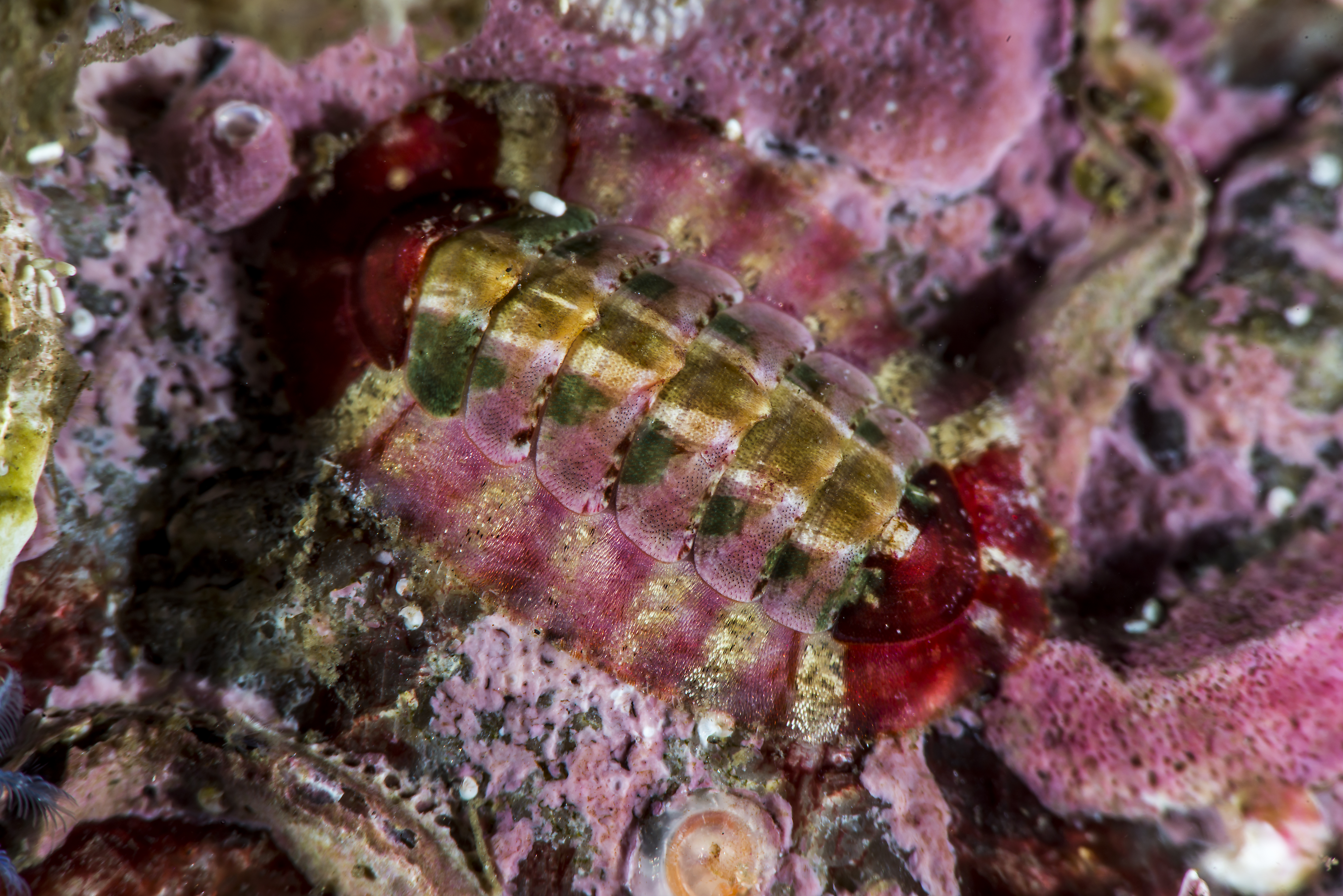
A chiton, Callochiton septemvalvis with interpigmental aesthetes visible as dark spots on the dorsal plates

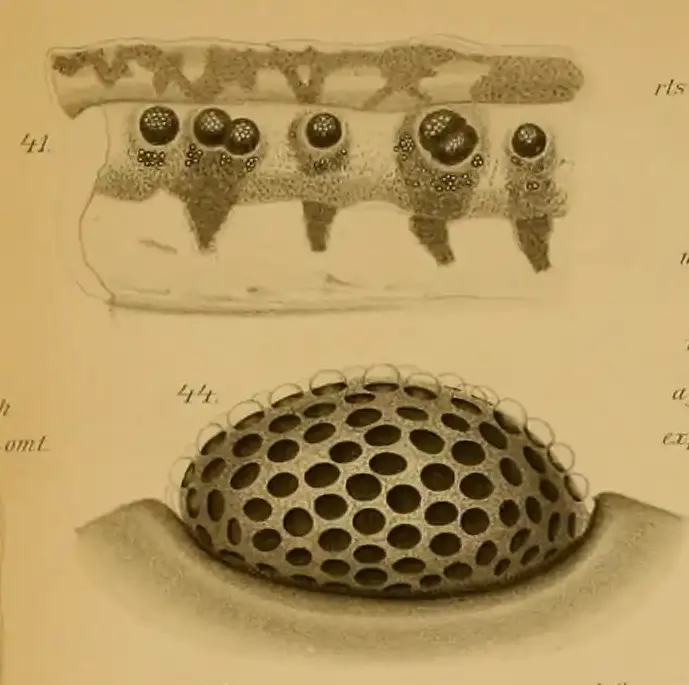
Illustration by William Patten depicting the compound eyes of arc clams

== See also ==
- Arthropod eye
- Parietal eye
- Sensory organs of gastropods
- Simple eye in invertebrates
- Vision in fish
- Visual system
