= Hanleya brachyplax =

Scientific classification
- Kingdom: Animalia
- Phylum: Mollusca
- Class: Polyplacophora
- Order: Lepidopleurida
- Family: Hanleyidae
- Genus: Hanleya
- Species: H. brachyplax

Binomial name
- Hanleya brachyplax Jardim & Simone, 2010

Synonyms
- Hanleya brachyplax Simone & Jardim [in Rios], 2009 (Description not fulfilling ICZN Art. 16.1 and 16.4)

Species of chiton

Hanleya brachyplax is a species of chiton, a polyplacophoran mollusc, which is endemic to Brazil.
