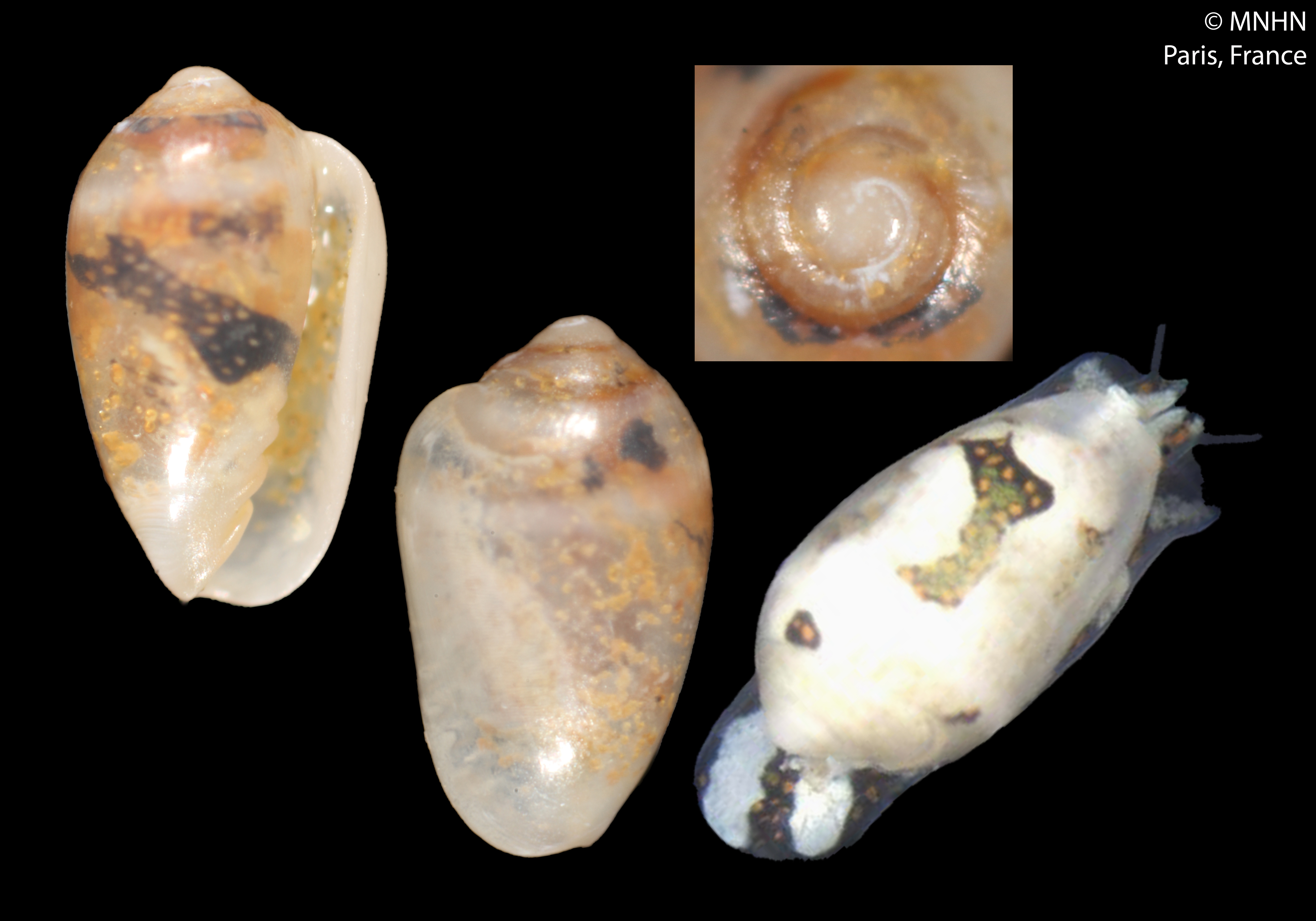
- Shell of Gibberula fortisminor (holotype at MNHN, Paris)

Scientific classification
- Kingdom: Animalia
- Phylum: Mollusca
- Class: Gastropoda
- Subclass: Caenogastropoda
- Order: Neogastropoda
- Family: Cystiscidae
- Subfamily: Cystiscinae
- Genus: Gibberula
- Species: G. fortisminor

Binomial name
- Gibberula fortisminor McCleery, 2008

= Gibberula fortisminor =

Species of gastropod

Gibberula fortisminor is a species of very small sea snail, a marine gastropod mollusc or micromollusc in the family Cystiscidae.

== Description ==
=== Shell Appearance and Structure ===
G. fortisminor is described by McCleery as having a smooth, glossy shell that is translucent white. The shell has a low spire with a moderately pointed apex, slightly convex teleoconch whorls, and a smooth suture. In addition, McCleery describes,

"suture sweeps up slightly to labial insertion point slightly below previous turn, shoulder moderately strong, posterior notch weak. Lip straight, slightly curled inwards and raised, thickened, slightly flared anteriorly, 8 very weak denticles fill more than half."

G. fortisminor has an interior shell structure with three columellar plications of which the first two are stronger than the third. The shell has two lirae that are weaker than the former. The shell is dextrally coiled.

=== Animal ===
The animal, or snail that lives inside of the shell, is white and semi-transparent with orange and black markings on the foot. The foot has six semi-white marks on the lateral sides, which are interspersed with orange and black spots. The animal has a split head that has medial semi-white marks and semi-transparent, unmarked tentacles. The eyes are black and are categorized as lens eyes. G. fortisminor has a short siphon, and its mantle roof has a white background with green and black marks intermingled with dull orange spots.

=== Size ===
1.63 x 0.94mm to 1.87 x 1.07mm. Width:Length ratio of 57-60%

== Distribution ==
This marine species occurs in the West Indies off St. Vincent and the Grenadines.

== Behavior ==
=== Habitat ===
G. fortisminor is an aquatic, desmeral (bottom-dwelling) species that lives in 2-3 meter deep waters.

=== Movement ===
G. fortisminor utilizes mucus mediated gliding, a technique that involves the animal generating muscular waves, through alternating contracting and expanding the muscles, that propel the animal over a mucus layer.

=== Diet ===
This species is a carnivorous predator, though there is no documented prey that this specific species is known to consume.

=== Reproduction ===
G. fortisminor reproduces sexually, is internally fertilized in the oviduct, and is a non-broadcast spawner.
