= Oldroydia =

Scientific classification
- Domain: Eukaryota
- Kingdom: Animalia
- Phylum: Mollusca
- Class: Polyplacophora
- Order: Lepidopleurida
- Family: Leptochitonidae
- Genus: Oldroydia; Dall, 1894

Genus of molluscs

Oldroydia is a genus of chitons belonging to the family Leptochitonidae.

The species of this genus are found in Northern America.

Species:

- Oldroydia bidentata
- Oldroydia percrassa (Dall, 1894)
