= Hemiarthrum =

Scientific classification
- Kingdom: Animalia
- Phylum: Mollusca
- Class: Polyplacophora
- Order: Chitonida
- Family: Hemiarthrumidae
- Genus: Hemiarthrum; Carpenter in Dall, 1876
- Species: H. setulosum

Binomial name
- Hemiarthrum setulosum Carpenter in Dall, 1876

Synonyms
- Acanthochiton couthouyi Rochebrune, 1889 (junior subjective synonym); Acanthochiton stygma Rochebrune, 1889 (uncertain synonym); Chiton castaneus A. Gould, 1852 (invalid: junior primary homonym of Chiton castaneus W. Wood, 1815); Hemiarthrum hamiltonorum Iredale & Hull, 1932; Hemiarthrum setulosum Powell, 1957

Genus of molluscs

Hemiarthrum setulosum is a species of chiton in the family Hemiarthrumidae, and the only member of the genus Hemiarthrum. It was previously assigned to the family Hanleyidae.

Hemiarthrum setulosum represent one of the five major clades of chitons that are living. Hemiarthrim setulosum has an incomplete lateral tract in the nerve ring. They are the only known species to have an incomplete one.

Synonym

- Hemiarthrum hamiltonorum Iredale & Hull, 1932: synonym of Hemiarthrum setulosum P. P. Carpenter [in Dall], 1876 (junior subjective synonym)

== Distribution ==
This species occurs off the Kerguelen Islands and Cape Horn.
