= Subradular organ =

The subradular organ is a sensory organ below the grinding mouthparts (radula) of some molluscs, specifically the chitons. This organ is involved in chemoreception - that is, in judging the nature of food or the substratum. In this sense, it can be considered a 'smell' or 'taste' organ; food is sensed before each stroke of the radula. Nerve cells from the subradular organ join into the buccal nerves.
