= Hemiarthrumidae =

Scientific classification
- Domain: Eukaryota
- Kingdom: Animalia
- Phylum: Mollusca
- Class: Polyplacophora
- Order: Chitonida
- Family: Hemiarthrumidae; Sirenko, 1997

Family of molluscs

Hemiarthrumidae is a family of chitons belonging to the order Chitonida.

Genera:

- Hemiarthrum Carpenter
- Weedingia Kaas, 1988
