= Loricidae =

Scientific classification
- Domain: Eukaryota
- Kingdom: Animalia
- Phylum: Mollusca
- Class: Polyplacophora
- Order: Chitonida
- Family: Loricidae; Iredale & Hull, 1923

Family of molluscs

Loricidae is a family of molluscs belonging to the order Chitonida.

Genera:

- Lorica Adams & Adams, 1852
- Loricella Pilsbry, 1893
