= Permochiton =

Permochiton Temporal range: Permian

Scientific classification
- Domain: Eukaryota
- Kingdom: Animalia
- Phylum: Mollusca
- Class: Polyplacophora
- Order: Lepidopleurida
- Family: Leptochitonidae
- Subfamily: †Helminthochitoninae
- Genus: †Permochiton; Iredale, T. & Hull, A. F. B. 1926 A monograph of the Australian Loricates (Phylum Mollusca Order Loricata), VIII. Australian Zoologist 4, 324–328.

Extinct genus of molluscs

Permochiton is an extinct genus of polyplacophoran molluscs. Permochiton became extinct during the Permian period.
