= Lorica (chiton) =

Lorica Temporal range: Cretaceous–Recent

Scientific classification
- Kingdom: Animalia
- Phylum: Mollusca
- Class: Polyplacophora
- Order: Chitonida
- Family: Loricidae
- Genus: Lorica; H. Adams & A. Adams, 1852

Species
- Lorica haurakiensis Mestayer, 1921; Lorica volvox (Reeve, 1847)

Synonyms
- Aulacochiton Shuttleworth, 1853; Protolorica Ashby, 1925; Zelorica Finlay, 1926

Genus of molluscs

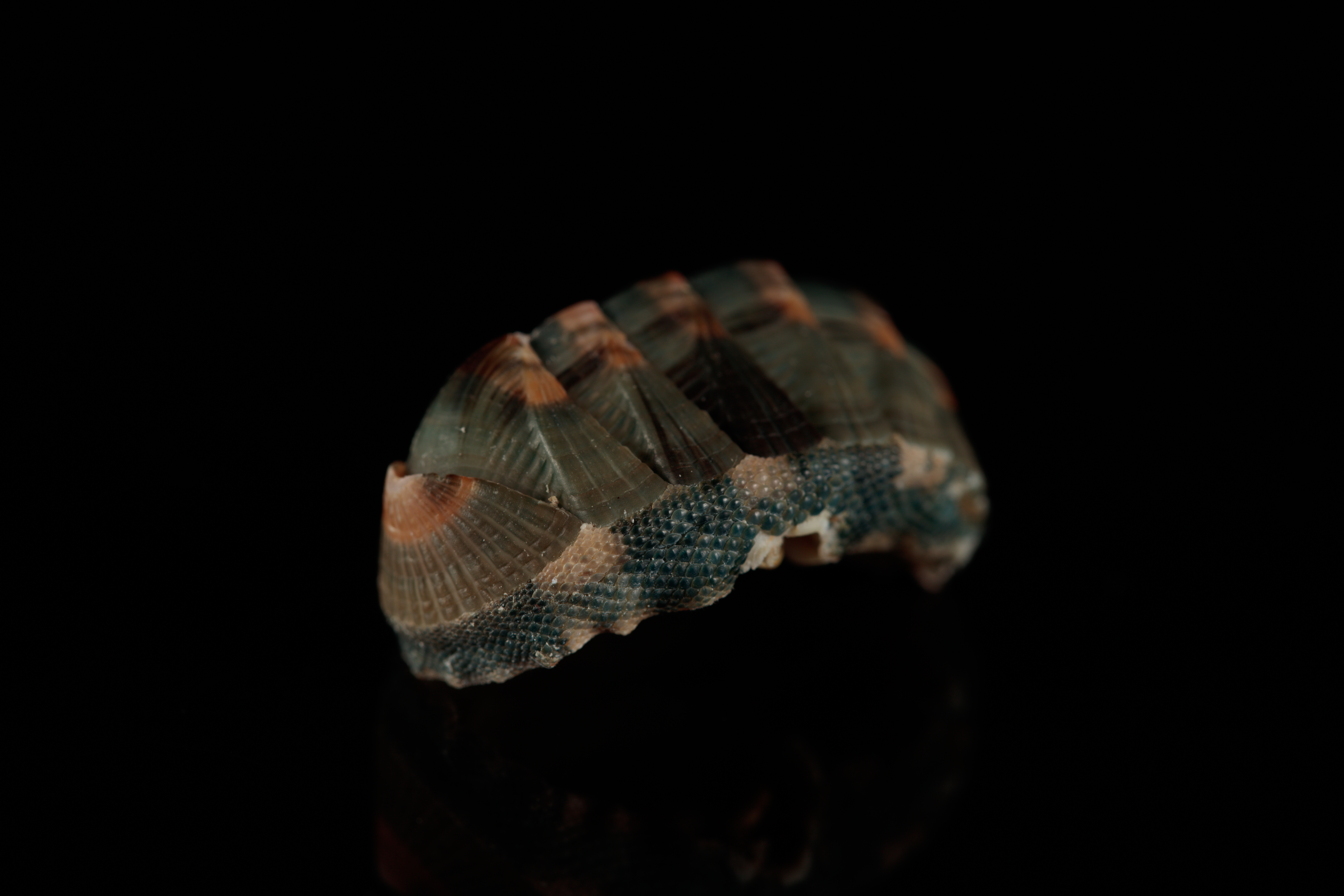
Lorica haurakiensis

Lorica is a genus of chitons in the family Schizochitonidae.

== Species ==
=== Loricahaurakiensis ===
This rare species is present in New Zealand.

=== Lorica volvox ===
Synonym: Chiton rudis Hutton, 1872 This species can reach a length of about 20.9 millimetres (0.82 in). It is present in Australia (New South Wales).

=== Extinct representatives ===
Extinct representatives of the genus are known from the Cretaceous of America and the Eocene & Miocene of Oceania.<
