= Nierstraszellidae =

Scientific classification
- Domain: Eukaryota
- Kingdom: Animalia
- Phylum: Mollusca
- Class: Polyplacophora
- Order: Lepidopleurida
- Family: Nierstraszellidae

Family of molluscs

Nierstraszellidae is a family of chitons belonging to the order Lepidopleurida.

Genera:

- Nierstraszella Sirenko, 1992
