= Oochiton =

Oochiton Temporal range: Miocene

Scientific classification
- Domain: Eukaryota
- Kingdom: Animalia
- Phylum: Mollusca
- Class: Polyplacophora
- Order: Chitonida
- Family: Schizochitonidae
- Genus: †Oochiton

Extinct genus of molluscs

Oochiton is an extinct genus of polyplacophoran molluscs. Oochiton became extinct during the Miocene period.
