= Weedingia =

Scientific classification
- Kingdom: Animalia
- Phylum: Mollusca
- Class: Polyplacophora
- Order: Chitonida
- Family: Hemiarthrumidae
- Genus: Weedingia; Kaas, 1988

Genus of molluscs

Weedingia is a genus of chitons belonging to the family Hemiarthrumidae.

The species of this genus are found in the Southern Hemisphere.

Species:

- Weedingia alborosea Kaas, 1988
- Weedingia exigua (Sowerby, 1832)
- Weedingia mooreana Kaas, 1988
- Weedingia paulayi Schwabe & Pittman, 2014
