= Schizochiton =

Schizochiton Temporal range: Miocene

Scientific classification
- Domain: Eukaryota
- Kingdom: Animalia
- Phylum: Mollusca
- Class: Polyplacophora
- Order: Chitonida
- Family: Schizochitonidae
- Genus: Schizochiton; Gray, 1847

Extinct genus of molluscs

Schizochiton is a genus of polyplacophoran molluscs. Schizochiton is known from Miocene fossils, as well as extant species.

== Extant species ==
- Schizochiton incisus (G. B. Sowerby II, 1841)
- Schizochiton jousseaumei Dupuis, 1917
