= Schizochitonidae =

Scientific classification
- Kingdom: Animalia
- Phylum: Mollusca
- Class: Polyplacophora
- Order: Chitonida
- Suborder: Chitonina
- Family: Schizochitonidae; Dall, 1889

Genera
- Schizochiton Gray, 1847; Lorica|Lorica (chiton)|Lorica Adams & Adams, 1852; Loricella|Loricella (chiton)|Loricella Pilsbry, 1893; Oochiton Ashby, 1929

Extinct family of molluscs

Schizochitonidae is a family of polyplacophoran molluscs.
