= Protochiton =

Protochiton Temporal range: Eocene

Scientific classification
- Domain: Eukaryota
- Kingdom: Animalia
- Phylum: Mollusca
- Class: Polyplacophora
- Order: Lepidopleurida
- Family: †Protochitonidae
- Genus: †Protochiton; Ashby, 1925

Extinct genus of molluscs

Protochiton is an extinct genus of polyplacophoran molluscs. Protochiton became extinct during the Eocene period.
