= Aesthete (chiton) =

Aesthetes are organs in chitons, derived from the mantle of the organism. They are generally believed to be tiny 'eyes', too small to be seen unaided, embedded in the organism's shell, acting in unison to function as a large, dispersed, compound eye. However, in 2013 studies suggested that aesthetes may serve the function of releasing material to repair the periostracum, a proteinaceous material covering the shell and protecting it from abrasion. This turned out to be false, as it was conclusively demonstrated in November 2015, that aesthetes are image forming eyes. This layer is constantly worn away by waves and debris as a function of their rugged habitat, and must be continuously replaced to protect the shell. Some chitons also have larger lens-bearing eyes.
