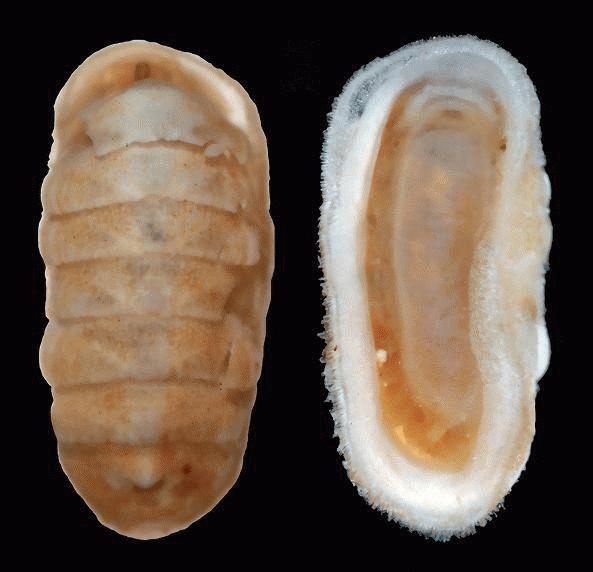
- Hanleya hanleyi

Scientific classification
- Kingdom: Animalia
- Phylum: Mollusca
- Class: Polyplacophora
- Order: Lepidopleurida
- Family: Hanleyidae
- Genus: Hanleya; Gray, 1857

= Hanleya =

Hanleya Temporal range: Oligocene–present

Genus of molluscs

Hanleya is a genus of polyplacophoran molluscs. It is represented today by a number of species including H. sinica Xu 1990 (China), H. brachyplax (Brazil) and H. hanleyi Bean in Thorpe, 1844 (Chile), which feeds on sponges. It is also known from Oligocene and Miocene fossils.
