= Loricella (chiton) =

Loricella Temporal range: Miocene–Recent

Scientific classification
- Kingdom: Animalia
- Phylum: Mollusca
- Class: Polyplacophora
- Order: Chitonida
- Family: Loricidae
- Genus: Loricella; Pilsbry, 1893

Species
- See text

Genus of molluscs

Loricella is a genus of chitons in the family Loricidae. They are marine molluscs.

== Taxonomy ==
Species in the genus include:

- Loricella angasi (H. Adams in H. Adams & Angas, 1864)
- Loricella dellangeloi Sirenko, 2008
- Loricella eernissei Sirenko, 2008
- Loricella oviformis (Nierstrasz, 1905)
- Loricella profundior (Dell, 1956)
- Loricella raceki (Milne, 1963)
- Loricella scissurata (Xu, 1990)
- Loricella vanbellei Sirenko, 2008
