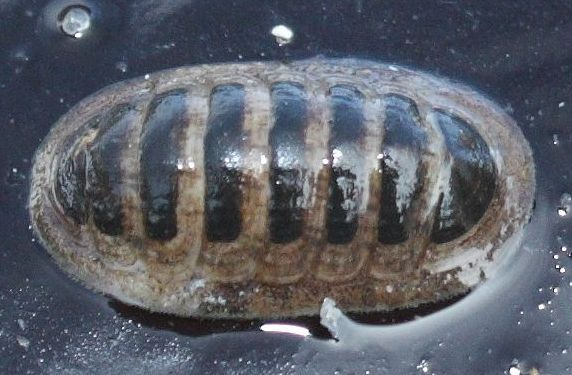
- Leptochiton asellus

Scientific classification
- Kingdom: Animalia
- Phylum: Mollusca
- Class: Polyplacophora
- Subclass: Loricata
- Order: Lepidopleurida; Thiele, 1910

= Lepidopleurida =

Order of molluscs

Lepidopleurida is an order of molluscs belonging to the class Polyplacophora. The order Lepidopleurida is the oldest group of polyplacophoran molluscs.

== Taxonomy ==
Lepidopleurida contains the following families:

- Abyssochitonidae
- †Acutichitonidae
- Afossochitonidae
- †Camptochitonidae
- †Cymatochitonidae
- †Glyptochitonidae
- †Gryphochitonidae
- Hanleyidae
- †Heterochitonidae
- †Lekiskochitonidae
- Leptochitonidae
- †Llandeilochitonidae
- †Mesochitonidae
- Nierstraszellidae
- †Permochitonidae
- Protochitonidae

† Extinct
