= List of prehistoric chitons =

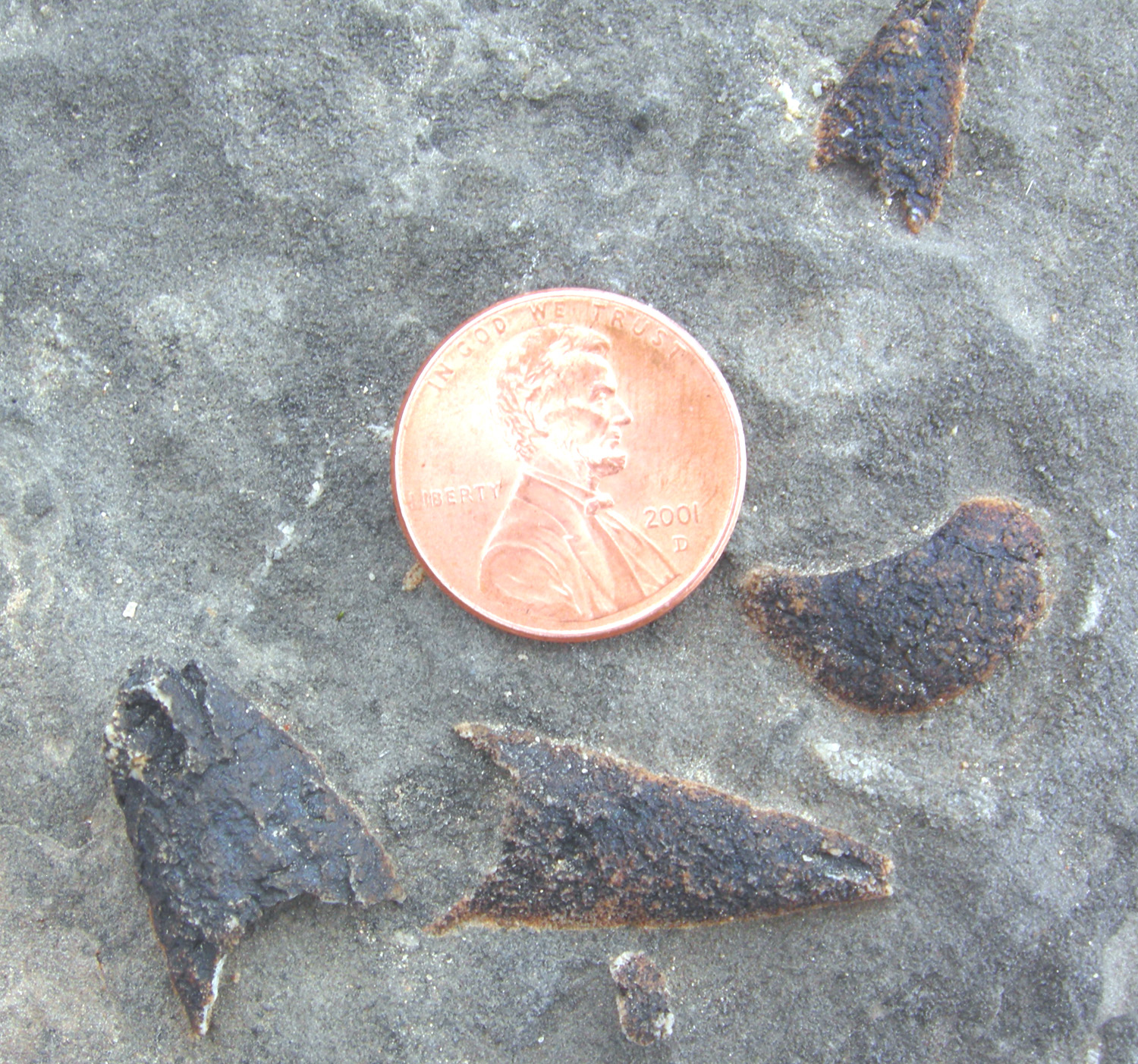
Matthevia

This list of prehistoric chitons is an attempt to create a comprehensive listing of all genera from the fossil record that have ever been considered to be polyplacophora, excluding purely vernacular terms. The list includes all commonly accepted genera, but also genera that are now considered invalid, doubtful (nomina dubia), or were not formally published (nomina nuda), as well as junior synonyms of more established names, and genera that are no longer considered chitons.

== Naming conventions and terminology ==
Naming conventions and terminology follow the International Code of Zoological Nomenclature. Technical terms used include:

- Junior synonym: A name which describes the same taxon as a previously published name. If two or more genera are formally designated and the type specimens are later assigned to the same genus, the first to be published (in chronological order) is the senior synonym, and all other instances are junior synonyms. Senior synonyms are generally used, except by special decision of the ICZN, but junior synonyms cannot be used again, even if deprecated. Junior synonymy is often subjective, unless the genera described were both based on the same type specimen.
- Nomen nudum (Latin for "naked name"): A name that has appeared in print but has not yet been formally published by the standards of the ICZN. Nomina nuda (the plural form) are invalid, and are therefore not italicized as a proper generic name would be. If the name is later formally published, that name is no longer a nomen nudum and will be italicized on this list. Often, the formally published name will differ from any nomina nuda that describe the same specimen.
- Nomen oblitum (Latin for "forgotten name"): A name that has not been used in the scientific community for more than fifty years after its original proposal.
- Preoccupied name: A name that is formally published, but which has already been used for another taxon. This second use is invalid (as are all subsequent uses) and the name must be replaced. As preoccupied names are not valid generic names, they will also go unitalicized on this list.
- Nomen dubium (Latin for "dubious name"): A name describing a fossil with no unique diagnostic features. As this can be an extremely subjective and controversial designation, this term is not used on this list.
- Acanthochitona
- Acanthopleura
- Acutichiton
- Afossochiton
- Allochiton
- Amicula
- Arcochiton
- Aulochiton
- Austrochiton
- Beloplaxus
- Bursata
- Calceochiton
- Callistochiton
- Callochiton
- Camptochiton
- Chaetopleura
- Chauliochiton
- Chelodes
- Chiton
- Cobcrephora
- Colapterochiton
- Coryssochiton
- Craspedochiton
- Crenatolorica
- Cryptochiton
- Cryptoconchus
- Cryptoplax
- Cyanoplax
- Cymatochiton
- Elachychiton
- Eochelodes
- Eudoxochiton
- Eulachychiton
- Euleptochiton
- Glaphurochiton
- Glyptochiton
- Gotlandochiton
- Gryphochiton
- Guildingia
- Haeggochiton
- Hanleya
- Hawthorneachiton
- Helminthochiton
- Hemithecella
- Heterochiton
- Ischnochiton
- Ivoechiton
- Katharina
- Kindbladochiton
- Laculina
- Lavenachiton
- Lekiskochiton
- Lepidochitona
- Lepidopleurus
- Lepidozona
- Leptochiton
- Lirachiton
- Llandeilochiton
- Loboarochiton
- Lorica
- Loricella
- Matthevia
- Mesochiton
- Notoplax
- Nuttallina
- Ochmazochiton
- Olingechiton
- Onithochiton
- Oochiton
- Paleochiton
- Pedanochiton
- Permochiton
- Pileochiton
- Placiphorella
- Plaxiphora
- Praecanthochiton
- Priscochiton
- Probolaeum
- Proleptochiton
- Protalochiton
- Protochiton
- Pseudoischnochiton
- Pterochiton
- Pterygochiton
- Rhyssoplax
- Sarkachiton
- Scanochiton
- Schizochiton
- Septemchiton
- Soleachiton
- Solenocaris
- Spicuchelodes
- Stegochiton
- Stenoplax
- Tonicella
- Tonicia
- Trachypleura

== See also ==
- List of prehistoric brittle stars
- List of prehistoric sea cucumbers
- List of crinoid genera
