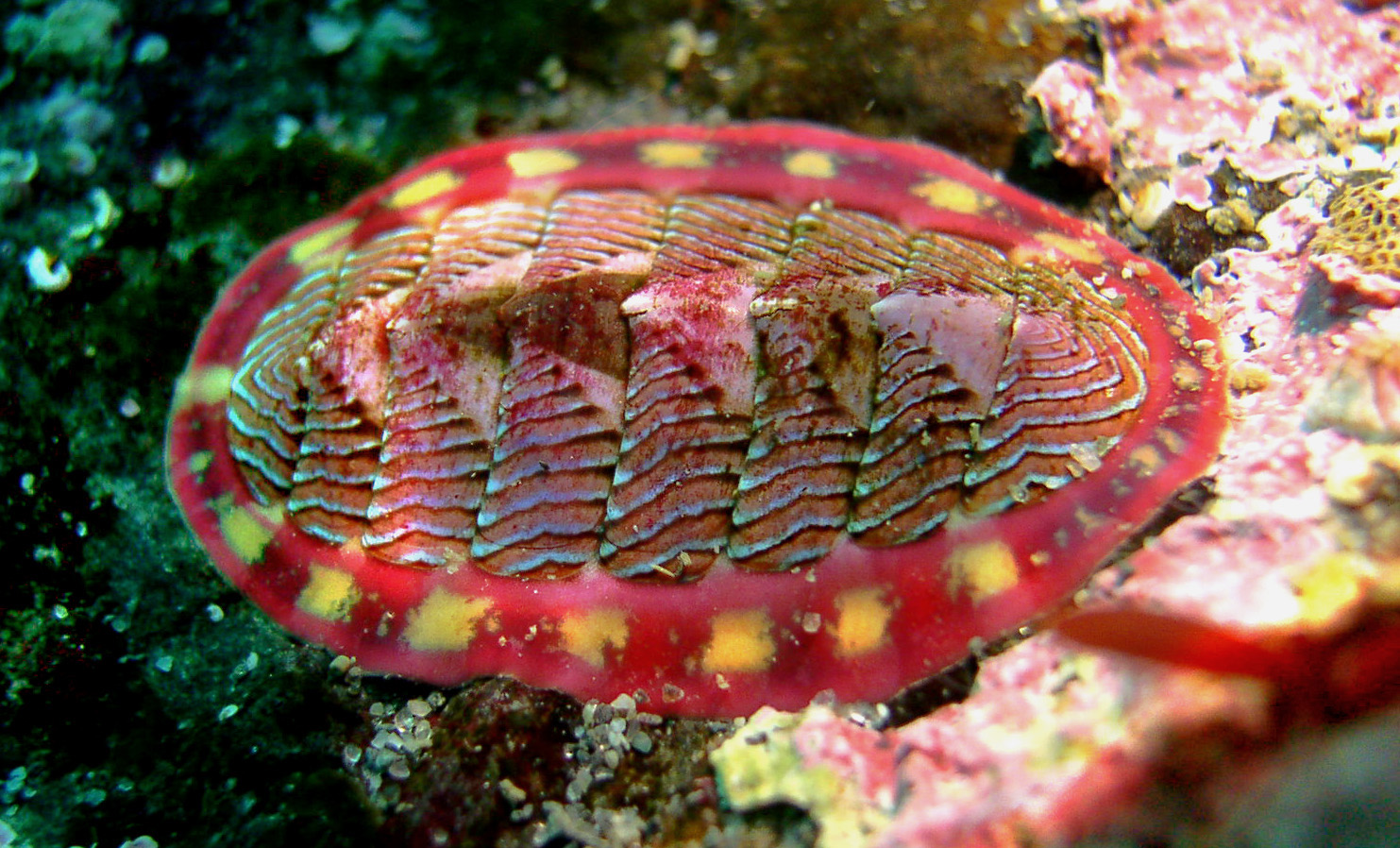
- Tonicella lineata

Scientific classification
- Domain: Eukaryota
- Kingdom: Animalia
- Phylum: Mollusca
- Class: Polyplacophora
- Subclass: Neoloricata; Bergenhayn, 1955

Families
- Suborder Lepidopleurina; Leptochitonidae; Protochitonidae; Hanleyidae; Afossochitonidae; Suborder Chitonina; Ischnochitonidae; Mopaliidae; Schizochitonidae; Chitonidae; Suborder Acanthochitonina; Cryptoplacidae; Acanthochitonidae; Lavenachiton (Family uncertain)

= Neoloricata =

Extinct subclass of mollusc

Neoloricata comprises the living representatives of the polyplacophoran molluscs, but also includes several species only known from fossils.
