= Lepidopleurus fairchildi =

Scientific classification
- Kingdom: Animalia
- Phylum: Mollusca
- Class: Polyplacophora
- Order: Lepidopleurida
- Family: Leptochitonidae
- Genus: Lepidopleurus
- Species: L. fairchildi

Binomial name
- Lepidopleurus fairchildi Iredale & Hull, 1929

Synonyms
- Lepidopleurus kerguelenensis Hedley, 1916; Terenochiton fairchildi Iredale & Hull, 1929

Species of mollusc

Lepidopleurus fairchildi is a species of chiton in the family Leptochitonidae.

== Distribution ==
This species is endemic to Australia's Macquarie Island in the Southern Ocean south of New Zealand.

== Habitat ==
This chiton lives on intertidal rocks.
