= Lepidopleurus otagoensis =

Scientific classification
- Kingdom: Animalia
- Phylum: Mollusca
- Class: Polyplacophora
- Order: Lepidopleurida
- Family: Leptochitonidae
- Genus: Lepidopleurus
- Species: L. otagoensis

Binomial name
- Lepidopleurus otagoensis Iredale and Hull, 1929

Synonyms
- Terenochiton otagoensis Iredale and Hull, 1929

Species of mollusc

Lepidopleurus otagoensis is a species of chiton in the family Leptochitonidae.
