= Lepidopleurus inquinatus =

Scientific classification
- Kingdom: Animalia
- Phylum: Mollusca
- Class: Polyplacophora
- Order: Lepidopleurida
- Family: Leptochitonidae
- Genus: Lepidopleurus
- Species: L. inquinatus

Binomial name
- Lepidopleurus inquinatus (Reeve, 1847)

Synonyms
- Chiton inquinatus Reeve, 1847; Lepidopleurus iredalei Ashby, 1921; Leptochiton inquinatus Reeve, 1847; Terenochiton inquinatus Iredale and Hull, 1929

Species of mollusc

Lepidopleurus inquinatus is a small species of chiton in the family Leptochitonidae, endemic to New Zealand.
