= Septemchitonidae =

Scientific classification
- Domain: Eukaryota
- Kingdom: Animalia
- Phylum: Mollusca
- Class: Polyplacophora
- Order: †Paleoloricata
- Suborder: †Septemchitonina
- Family: †Septemchitonidae; Bergenhayn, 1955

Genera
- Paleochiton A. G. Smith, 1964; Septemchiton Bergenhayn, 1955; Thairoplax Cherns, 1998

Extinct family of marine molluscs

Septemchitonidae is an extinct family of chitons (Polyplacophora) known from Europe and North America. Morphologically, the clade is defined by rectangular plates, and the upside-down V-shape of species' valves when viewed in cross-section.
