= Rhombichiton =

Scientific classification
- Domain: Eukaryota
- Kingdom: Animalia
- Phylum: Mollusca
- Class: Polyplacophora
- Genus: †Rhombichiton; DeKoninck, 1883

Extinct genus of molluscs

Rhombichiton is a genus of polyplacophoran mollusc. Some consider it to be synonymous with Pterochiton.
