= Lepidopleurus finlayi =

Scientific classification
- Kingdom: Animalia
- Phylum: Mollusca
- Class: Polyplacophora
- Order: Lepidopleurida
- Family: Leptochitonidae
- Genus: Lepidopleurus
- Species: L. finlayi

Binomial name
- Lepidopleurus finlayi (Ashby, 1929)

Species of mollusc

Lepidopleurus finlayi is a species of chiton in the family Leptochitonidae.
