= Medland =

Medland is a surname, and may refer to:

- Hubert Medland (1881–1964), British Labour Party politician
- Lilian Marguerite Medland (1880–1955), English-born Australian nurse and illustrator of books on birds
- Sarah Medland, Australian psychiatric geneticist
- Thomas Medland (c.1765–1833), English engraver and draughtsman
