= Parachiton =

Parachiton Temporal range: Miocene

Scientific classification
- Domain: Eukaryota
- Kingdom: Animalia
- Phylum: Mollusca
- Class: Polyplacophora
- Order: Lepidopleurida
- Family: Leptochitonidae
- Subfamily: Leptochitoninae
- Genus: Parachiton

Extinct genus of molluscs

Parachiton is a genus of polyplacophoran mollusc. The genus includes both extant and extinct species.
