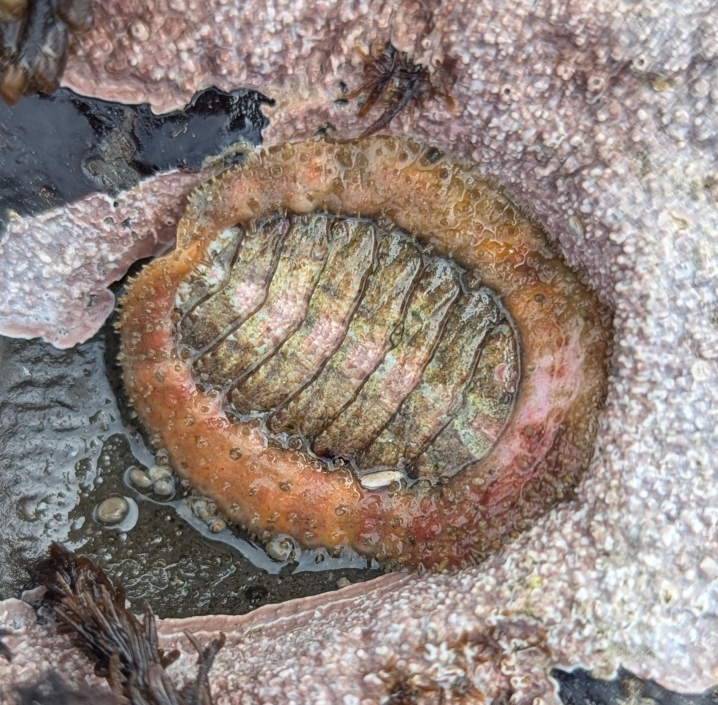
- Placiphorella velata with its anterior girdle retracted, Moss Beach, 2025

Scientific classification
- Kingdom: Animalia
- Phylum: Mollusca
- Class: Polyplacophora
- Order: Chitonida
- Family: Mopaliidae
- Genus: Placiphorella
- Species: P. velata

Binomial name
- Placiphorella velata Dall, 1879
- Placiphorella velata range map, estimated with the iNaturalist Geomodel, 2025

Synonyms
- Mopalia velata Dall, 1879

= Placiphorella velata =

Species of mollusc

Placiphorella velata, commonly known as the veiled chiton or jockey-cap chiton, is a species of chiton found in rocky crevices from Alaska to Baja California.

== Description ==
The veiled chiton has eight overlapping plates (valves), which are all visible on the dorsal surface. The plates are brown, pink, or green, and typically streaked or mottled with various accent colors. The plates are surrounded by a cream colored girdle, which is sparsely covered in long setae. The most distinguishing feature is the prolonged anterior end of the girdle, called the veil, which is often lighter in color than the rest of the girdle. It is for this veil that the species is named.

== Natural history ==
The veiled chiton can be found in very low intertidal and subtidal areas with moderate waves or tidal flow. It belongs to one of only three known genera of predatory chitons, which also include Loricella and Craspedochiton. Like most chitons, the veiled chiton will graze on coralline algae, but it will also hunt for small worms and amphipods, which it can trap under its veil. To do so, it raises its veil high above the surface of the rock and waits for prey to wander underneath. When prey brush against the chiton's sensitive tentacles, it rapidly snaps its veil down to trap them in under a second.
