= Lepidopleurus =

Lepidopleurus Temporal range: Paleocene–Miocene

Scientific classification
- Kingdom: Animalia
- Phylum: Mollusca
- Class: Polyplacophora
- Order: Lepidopleurida
- Family: Leptochitonidae
- Subfamily: Leptochitoninae
- Genus: Lepidopleurus; Risso, 1826

Species
- See text

Extinct genus of molluscs

Lepidopleurus is an extant genus of chitons in the family Leptochitonidae.

== Species ==
- Lepidopleurus cajetanus (Poli, 1791)
- Lepidopleurus fairchildi Iredale & Hull, 1929
- Lepidopleurus finlayi (Ashby, 1929)
- Lepidopleurus inquinatus (Reeve, 1847)
- Lepidopleurus otagoensis Iredale & Hull, 1929
- Lepidopleurus pergranatus
