= Chelodina (chiton) =

Chelodina Temporal range: 488.3–70.6 Ma

Scientific classification
- Kingdom: Animalia
- Phylum: Mollusca
- Class: Polyplacophora
- Order: †Paleoloricata
- Suborder: †Chelodina; Bergenhayn, 1960

Families
- Chelodidae; Scanochitonidae

Extinct suborder of molluscs

Chelodina is a suborder of polyplacophoran mollusc that appeared during the Cambrian and became extinct during the Cretaceous. It is known from fossils from Europe and North America.
