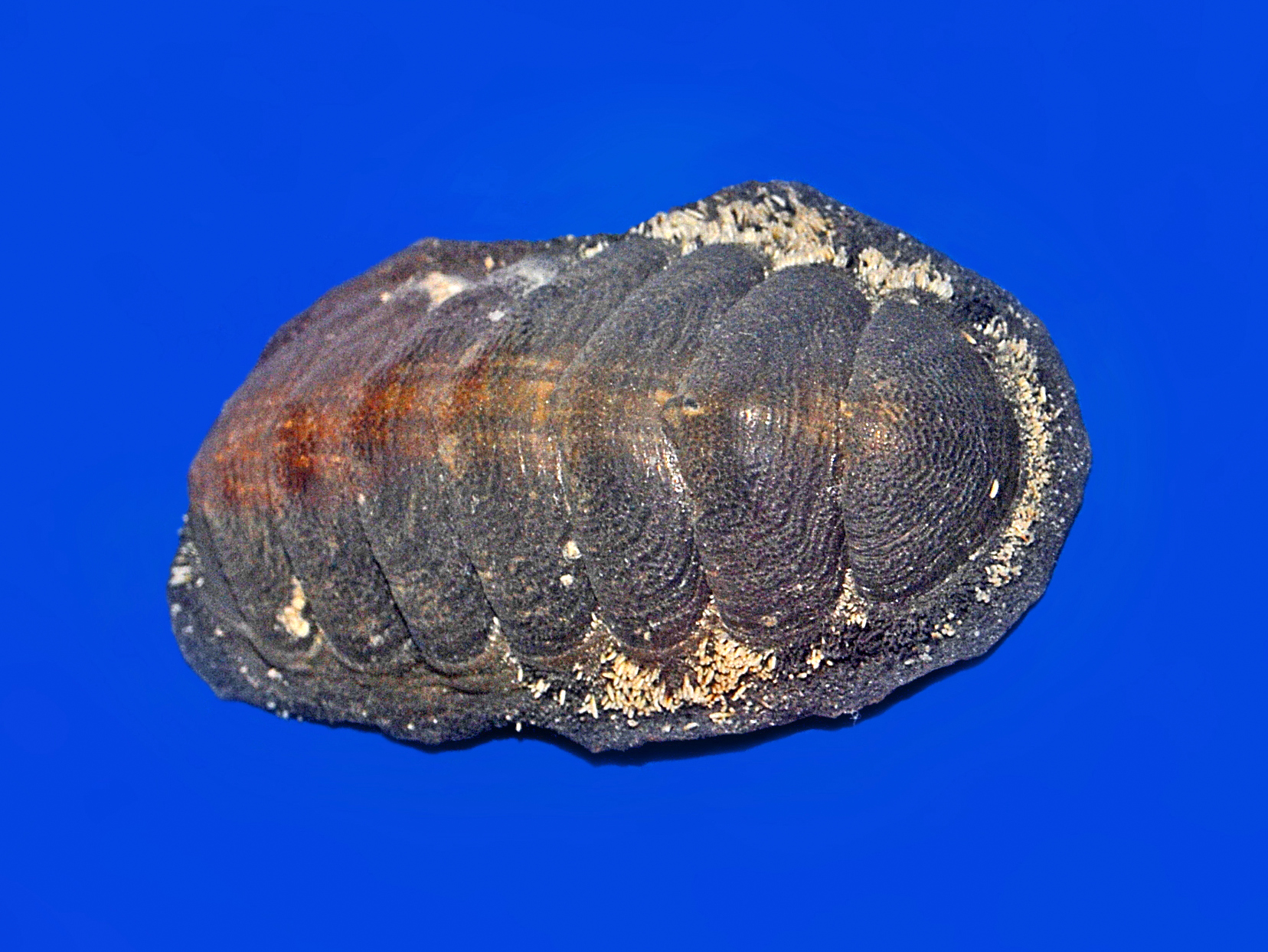
- A mounted specimen of Acanthopleura gemmata at the Museo Civico di Storia Naturale di Milano

Scientific classification
- Domain: Eukaryota
- Kingdom: Animalia
- Phylum: Mollusca
- Class: Polyplacophora
- Order: Chitonida
- Family: Chitonidae
- Subfamily: Acanthopleurinae
- Genus: Acanthopleura
- Species: A. gemmata

Binomial name
- Acanthopleura gemmata (Blainville, 1825)

Synonyms
- Acanthopleura balansae Rochebrune, 1882; Acanthopleura bergenhayni Leloup, 1937; Acanthopleura gemmata maudensis Ashby, 1928; Acanthopleura gemmata queenslandica Ashby, 1923; Acanthopleura glareosa E. A. Smith, 1884; Acanthopleura rawakiana Rochebrune, 1882; Acanthopleura spicifera [sic] (misspelling); Acanthopleura spiniger (G. B. Sowerby II, 1839) (the nominal species is a synonym of Acanthopleura gemmata; W Indian Ocean records refer to A. testudo; Red Sea records to A. vaillantii (see Kaas et al. 2006); Acanthozostera virens Ang, 1967; Chiton gemmatus Blainville, 1825 (original combination); Chiton macgillivrayi A. Adams, 1855 (junior synonym); Chiton spiniger G. B. Sowerby II, 1839

= Acanthopleura gemmata =

Species of mollusc

Acanthopleura gemmata, the jewelled chiton, is a species of chiton in the family Chitonidae.

== Description ==
This large species of chiton grows to be about 7 cm (3 inches) in length. It has oval shaped body with dimpled plate margins, a brown girdle with eight overlapping plates, long calcareous spicules and dark bands.

== Distribution ==
This chiton has an Indo-Pacific distribution.

== Habitat ==
This species lives in the littoral zone of coral reefs on the rocks and cliffs.
