= Septemchitonina =

Scientific classification
- Domain: Eukaryota
- Kingdom: Animalia
- Phylum: Mollusca
- Class: Polyplacophora
- Order: †Paleoloricata
- Suborder: †Septemchitonina

Families
- Septemchitonidae

Extinct suborder of molluscs

Septemchitonina is an extinct suborder of polyplacophoran molluscs.
