= Chelodidae =

Scientific classification
- Domain: Eukaryota
- Kingdom: Animalia
- Phylum: Mollusca
- Class: Polyplacophora
- Order: †Paleoloricata
- Suborder: †Chelodina
- Family: †Chelodidae

Genera
- Eochelodes Marek, 1962; Paleochiton Smith, 1964; Calceochiton Flower, 1968

Extinct family of molluscs

Chelodidae is an extinct family of polyplacophoran mollusc.
