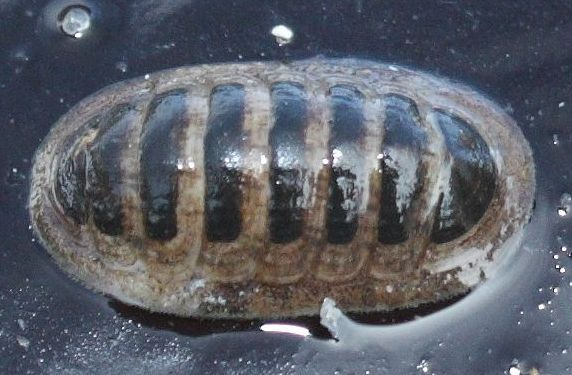
- Leptochiton asellus

Scientific classification
- Kingdom: Animalia
- Phylum: Mollusca
- Class: Polyplacophora
- Order: Lepidopleurida
- Suborder: Lepidopleurina
- Family: Leptochitonidae
- Subfamily: Leptochitoninae
- Genus: Leptochiton; Gray, 1847

Type species
- Chiton asellus Gmelin, 1791

Synonyms
- List: †Belchiton Ashby & Cotton, 1939; Chiton (Leptochiton) Gray, 1847; Holochiton P. Fischer, 1887; Lepidopleurus (Leptochiton) Gray, 1847; Lepidopleurus (Pilsbryella) Nierstrasz, 1905; Lepidopleurus (Xiphiozona) S. S. Berry, 1919; Leptochiton (Leptochiton) Gray, 1847; Leptochiton (Pilsbryella) Nierstrasz, 1905; Leptochiton (Xiphiozona) S. S. Berry, 1919

= Leptochiton (chiton) =

Leptochiton Temporal range: Jurassic–Recent

Genus of molluscs

Leptochiton is a genus of polyplacophoran molluscs.

Some Leptochiton species became extinct during the Pliocene period, but there are also extant species.

== Distribution ==
Worldwide.

== Species ==
The following species are recognised in the genus Leptochiton:

- Leptochiton abacinus (Dell'Angelo & Palazzi, 1989) †
- Leptochiton alascensis (Thiele, 1909)
- Leptochiton albemarlensis A. G. Smith & A. J. Ferreira, 1977
- Leptochiton algesirensis (Capellini, 1859)
- Leptochiton americanus Kaas & Van Belle, 1985
- Leptochiton amsterdamensis Kaas & Van Belle, 1990
- Leptochiton angustidens Sigwart & Sirenko, 2012
- Leptochiton antarcticus Sirenko, 2015
- Leptochiton antondohrni Taviani, Sosso & Dell'Angelo, 2023 †
- Leptochiton arcticus (G. O. Sars, 1878)
- Leptochiton asellus (Gmelin, 1791)
- Leptochiton assimilis (Thiele, 1909)
- Leptochiton babidus (Ashby & Cotton, 1939) †
- Leptochiton badioides (Ashby & Cotton, 1939) †
- Leptochiton badius (Hedley & Hull, 1909)
- Leptochiton batialis Sirenko, 1978
- Leptochiton bednalli (Torr, 1912)
- Leptochiton bedullii Dell'Angelo & Palazzi, 1986
- Leptochiton benthedi (Leloup, 1981)
- Leptochiton beui Sirenko, 2020
- Leptochiton binghami (Boone, 1928)
- Leptochiton blikshteyni Sirenko, 2019
- Leptochiton boettgeri (Šulc, 1934) †
- Leptochiton boucheti Sirenko, 2001
- Leptochiton cancellatus (G. B. Sowerby II, 1840)
- Leptochiton cancelloides Kaas, 1982
- Leptochiton cascadiensis Sigwart & C. Chen, 2017
- Leptochiton chariessa (Barnard, 1963)
- Leptochiton chatticus (Janssen, 1978) †
- Leptochiton cimicoides (Monterosato, 1879)
- Leptochiton clarki S. S. Berry, 1922 †
- Leptochiton clifdenensis (Ashby, 1929) †
- Leptochiton collusor (Iredale & Hull, 1925)
- Leptochiton columnarius (Hedley & May, 1908)
- Leptochiton commandorensis Sirenko, 2017
- Leptochiton compostellanus Carmona Zalvide & Urgorri, 1999
- Leptochiton consimilis Sigwart & Sirenko, 2012
- Leptochiton corticellii Dell'Angelo, Sosso & Taviani, 2025 †
- Leptochiton darioi (Righi, 1973)
- Leptochiton deforgesi Sirenko, 2001
- Leptochiton denhartogi Strack, 2003
- Leptochiton dispersus Kaas, 1985
- Leptochiton diversigranosus (Ashby & Cotton, 1939) †
- Leptochiton dykei Sigwart & Sirenko, 2012
- Leptochiton eckelsheimensis (Gürs, 1992) †
- Leptochiton fairchildi (Iredale & Hull, 1929)
- Leptochiton faxensis Sigwart, Andersen & Schnetler, 2007 †
- Leptochiton ferreirai Sirenko & Sellanes, 2016
- Leptochiton finlayi (Ashby, 1929)
- Leptochiton fischeri (Rochebrune, 1883) †
- Leptochiton foresti (Leloup, 1981)
- Leptochiton freiwaldi Dell'Angelo, Sosso & Taviani, 2024 †
- Leptochiton fuliginatus (Reeve, 1847)
- Leptochiton gascognensis Kaas & Van Belle, 1985
- Leptochiton geronensis Kaas & Van Belle, 1985
- Leptochiton gloriosus Kaas, 1985
- Leptochiton gowlettholmesae Sirenko, 2023
- Leptochiton guadelupei Sirenko, 2018
- Leptochiton habei H. Saito, 1997
- Leptochiton hakodatensis (Thiele, 1909)
- Leptochiton hirasei (Is. Taki & Iw. Taki, 1929)
- Leptochiton hiriensis Schwabe & Lozouet, 2006
- Leptochiton hodgsoni (Sirenko, 2000)
- Leptochiton ibanezi Sirenko & Sellanes, 2016
- Leptochiton incongruus (Dall, 1908)
- Leptochiton inquinatus (Reeve, 1847)
- Leptochiton josei Dell'Angelo, Sosso, Prudenza & Bonfitto, 2013 †
- Leptochiton juvenis (Leloup, 1981)
- Leptochiton kantori Sirenko, 2016
- Leptochiton kerguelensis Haddon, 1886
- Leptochiton kurnilatus Kaas, 1985
- Leptochiton lascrusesi Sirenko, 2015
- Leptochiton lateropustulosus Dell'Angelo, Landau, Van Dingenen & Ceulemans, 2018 †
- Leptochiton latidens (Bergenhayn, 1933)
- Leptochiton laurae Schwabe & Sellanes, 2010
- Leptochiton leloupi Kaas, 1979
- Leptochiton lignatilis Dell'Angelo, Bertolaso & Sosso, 2015 †
- Leptochiton linseae Sirenko, 2015
- Leptochiton liratellus (Iredale & Hull, 1925)
- Leptochiton liratus (H. Adams & Angas, 1864)
- Leptochiton longibranchiae Sirenko, 2015
- Leptochiton longigranum Sirenko, 2020
- Leptochiton longisetosus Sigwart & Sirenko, 2012
- Leptochiton longispinus H. Saito, 2001
- Leptochiton luridus (Dall, 1902)
- Leptochiton madagascaricus Sirenko, 2019
- Leptochiton magnogranifer (Ashby, 1925) †
- Leptochiton maguntiacus (Rochebrune, 1883) †
- Leptochiton marshalli Sirenko, 2020
- Leptochiton matthewsianus (Bednall, 1906)
- Leptochiton medinae (Plate, 1899)
- Leptochiton meiringae Kaas, 1985
- Leptochiton micropustulosus Kaas, 1994
- Leptochiton milwaukensis Sirenko, 2024
- Leptochiton muelleri Sirenko & Schwabe, 2011
- Leptochiton myeikensis H. Saito & Aung, 2021
- Leptochiton neocaledonicus Sirenko, 2016
- Leptochiton nexus P. P. Carpenter, 1864
- Leptochiton nierstraszi (Leloup, 1981)
- Leptochiton nivarus (Ashby & Cotton, 1939) †
- Leptochiton odhneri (Bergenhayn, 1931)
- Leptochiton otagoensis (Iredale & Hull, 1929)
- Leptochiton parvus Dell'Angelo, Landau, Van Dingenen & Ceulemans, 2018 †
- Leptochiton pepezamorai Carmona Zalvide, Urgorri & F. J. García, 2004
- Leptochiton pergranatus Dall, 1889
- Leptochiton permodestus Kaas, 1985
- Leptochiton perscitus Kaas, 1991
- Leptochiton persianus Sirenko, 2022
- Leptochiton peruvianus Sirenko, 2015
- Leptochiton poirieri (Rochebrune, 1883) †
- Leptochiton prudenzae Dell'Angelo, Sosso & Taviani, 2025 †
- Leptochiton pseudogloriosus Strack, 1991
- Leptochiton pulcherrimus (Ashby & Cotton, 1939) †
- Leptochiton pumilus Sirenko & H. Saito, 2020
- Leptochiton renauleauensis Dell'Angelo, Landau, Van Dingenen & Ceulemans, 2018 †
- Leptochiton rissoi (Nierstrasz, 1905)
- Leptochiton rogeri Sigwart & Sirenko, 2015
- Leptochiton rugatus (P. P. Carpenter, 1892)
- Leptochiton rumani Dell'Angelo, Sosso & Taviani, 2025 †
- Leptochiton saitoi Sirenko, 2001
- Leptochiton salicensis (Dell'Angelo & Bonfitto, 2005) †
- Leptochiton samadiae Sigwart & Sirenko, 2012
- Leptochiton sanmatiensis Güller, Liuzzi & Zelaya, 2015
- Leptochiton sarsi Kaas, 1981
- Leptochiton scabridus (Jeffreys, 1880)
- Leptochiton schwabei Sigwart & Sirenko, 2012
- Leptochiton sephus (Ashby & Cotton, 1939) †
- Leptochiton serenae Dell'Angelo, Piccioli Resto & Bonfitto, 2007 †
- Leptochiton setiger (Nierstrasz, 1905)
- Leptochiton sinervus (Ashby & Cotton, 1939) †
- Leptochiton singus (Ashby & Cotton, 1939) †
- Leptochiton smirnovi Sirenko, 2016
- Leptochiton sperandus (Iredale & Hull, 1925)
- Leptochiton spiniferus Sirenko, 2020
- Leptochiton subantarcticus (Iredale & Hull, 1930)
- Leptochiton subrugatus Sirenko & Sigwart, 2021
- Leptochiton sulci (Baluk, 1971) †
- Leptochiton surugensis H. Saito, 1997
- Leptochiton sykesi (G. B. Sowerby III, 1903)
- Leptochiton tahitiensis Sirenko, 2020
- Leptochiton tavianii Dell'Angelo, Landau & Marquet, 2004 †
- Leptochiton tenuidontus H. Saito & Okutani, 1990
- Leptochiton tenuis Kaas, 1979
- Leptochiton terryiverseni Hybertsen & Kiel, 2018 †
- Leptochiton thalattius Kaas & Van Belle, 1985
- Leptochiton thandari Sirenko, 2001
- Leptochiton torishimensis (S.-K. Wu & Okutani, 1984)
- Leptochiton troncosoi Carmona Zalvide, Urgorri & F. J. García, 2004
- Leptochiton uhligi (Koenen, 1892) †
- Leptochiton uxellus (Ashby & Cotton, 1939) †
- Leptochiton vanbellei Sirenko, 2001
- Leptochiton vanuatuensis Sirenko, 2016
- Leptochiton vaubani Kaas, 1991
- Leptochiton vietnamensis Sirenko, 1998
- Leptochiton vitjazi (Sirenko, 1977)
- Leptochiton wui Sirenko, 2018
- Leptochiton xanthus Kaas & Van Belle, 1990
