= Calceochiton =

Calceochiton Temporal range: Ordovician

Scientific classification
- Domain: Eukaryota
- Kingdom: Animalia
- Phylum: Mollusca
- Class: Polyplacophora
- Order: †Paleoloricata
- Family: †Chelodidae
- Genus: †Calceochiton

Extinct genus of molluscs

Calceochiton is an extinct genus of polyplacophoran molluscs. Calceochiton became extinct during the Ordovician period.
