= Olingechiton =

Olingechiton Temporal range: Cretaceous

Scientific classification
- Domain: Eukaryota
- Kingdom: Animalia
- Phylum: Mollusca
- Class: Polyplacophora
- Order: †Paleoloricata
- Family: †Scanochitonidae
- Genus: †Olingechiton

Extinct genus of molluscs

Olingechiton is an extinct genus of polyplacophoran molluscs. Olingechiton became extinct at the end of the Cretaceous period.
