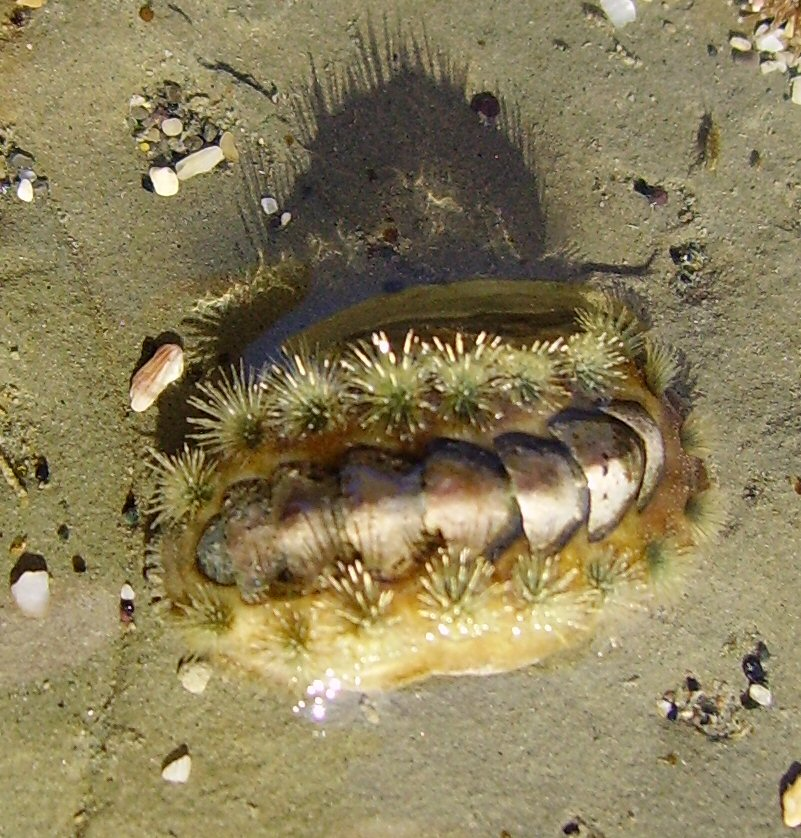

Scientific classification
- Domain: Eukaryota
- Kingdom: Animalia
- Phylum: Mollusca
- Class: Polyplacophora
- Order: Chitonida
- Suborder: Acanthochitonina; Bergenhayn, 1930

Subdivisions
- Cryptoplacidae; Acanthochitonidae; Lavenachiton (Family uncertain)

= Acanthochitonina =

Extinct suborder of molluscs

Acanthochitonina is a suborder of polyplacophoran mollusc comprising both fossil and extant species.
