= Glaphurochiton =

Glaphurochiton Temporal range: Pennsylvanian

Scientific classification
- Domain: Eukaryota
- Kingdom: Animalia
- Phylum: Mollusca
- Class: Polyplacophora
- Order: Lepidopleurida
- Family: Lepidopleuridae
- Genus: †Glaphurochiton

Extinct genus of molluscs

Glaphurochiton is a genus of fossil chitons known from the Mazon Creek biota.

Remarkably, it contains an intact radula, which with 17 teeth per row and over 100 rows is almost identical to the radula of modern chitons (even though the crown group emerged in the Mesozoic). The radula extends from the first to third shell plates.
