= Eochelodes =

Eochelodes Temporal range: Ordovician

Scientific classification
- Domain: Eukaryota
- Kingdom: Animalia
- Phylum: Mollusca
- Class: Polyplacophora
- Order: †Paleoloricata
- Family: †Chelodidae
- Genus: †Eochelodes; Marek, 1962

Extinct genus of molluscs

Eochelodes is an extinct genus of polyplacophoran molluscs.
