= Scanochitonidae =

Scientific classification
- Domain: Eukaryota
- Kingdom: Animalia
- Phylum: Mollusca
- Class: Polyplacophora
- Order: †Paleoloricata
- Suborder: †Chelodina
- Family: †Scanochitonidae

Genera
- †Scanochiton Bergenhayn, 1943; †Olingechiton Bergenhayn, 1943; †Gotlandochiton Bergenhayn, 1955; †Haeggochiton Bergenhayn, 1955; †Ivoechiton Bergenhayn, 1955; †Kindbladochiton Van Belle, 1975

Extinct family of molluscs

Scanchitonidae is an extinct family of polyplacophoran mollusc.
