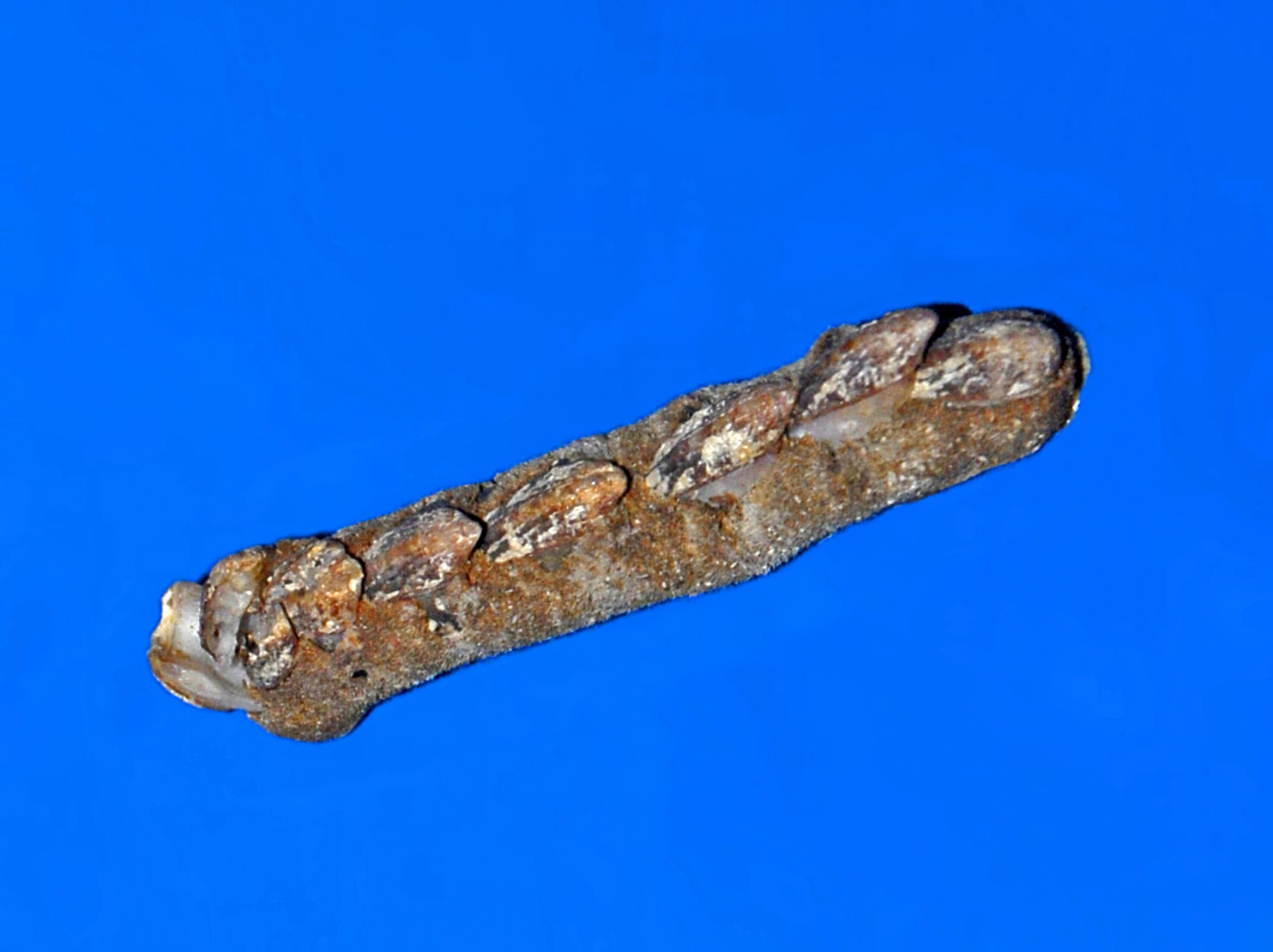
- Cryptoplax iredalei. Museum specimen

Scientific classification
- Kingdom: Animalia
- Phylum: Mollusca
- Class: Polyplacophora
- Order: Chitonida
- Family: Cryptoplacidae
- Genus: Cryptoplax
- Species: C. iredalei

Binomial name
- Cryptoplax iredalei E. Ashby, 1923

= Cryptoplax iredalei =

Species of mollusc

Cryptoplax iredalei, the Iredale's fleshy-chiton, is a species of chiton in the genus Cryptoplax.

== Description ==
The typical shell-length of Cryptoplax iredalei can reach about 36 millimetres (1.4 in). Body is narrow and flattened, oval shaped, with 8 shell sections or valves. The basic color is brown to red-brown, sometimes with light and dark bands.

== Distribution and habitat ==
This species is endemic to southeastern and southwestern Australia. These chitons can be found subtidally under rocks and stones.

== Etymology ==
The name honours Tom Iredale.
