= Haeggochiton =

Haeggochiton Temporal range: Cretaceous

Scientific classification
- Domain: Eukaryota
- Kingdom: Animalia
- Phylum: Mollusca
- Class: Polyplacophora
- Order: †Paleoloricata
- Family: †Scanochitonidae
- Genus: †Haeggochiton; Bergenhayn, 1955

Extinct genus of molluscs

Haeggochiton is an extinct genus of polyplacophoran mollusc known from a single occurrence in the Cretaceous of Europe.
