= Gotlandochiton =

Gotlandochiton Temporal range: Ordovician–Silurian

Scientific classification
- Domain: Eukaryota
- Kingdom: Animalia
- Phylum: Mollusca
- Class: Polyplacophora
- Order: †Paleoloricata
- Family: †Scanochitonidae
- Genus: †Gotlandochiton

Extinct genus of molluscs

Gotlandochiton is an extinct genus of polyplacophoran mollusc. Gotlandochiton became extinct during the Silurian period.
