= Acutichiton =

Acutichiton Temporal range: Lower Devonian– Carboniferous

Scientific classification
- Kingdom: Animalia
- Phylum: Mollusca
- Class: Polyplacophora
- Order: Lepidopleurida
- Family: Leptochitonidae
- Subfamily: †Helminthochitoninae
- Genus: †Acutichiton; Hoare, R.D.; Sturgeon, M.T.; Hoare, T.B. (1972). "Middle Pennsylvanian (Allegheny Group) Polyplacophora from Ohio". Journal of Paleontology. 46 (5): 675–680. JSTOR 1303024.

Species
- A. PYRMIDALUS Hoare, R.D.; Sturgeon, M.T.; Hoare, T.B. (1972). "Middle Pennsylvanian (Allegheny Group) Polyplacophora from Ohio". Journal of Paleontology. 46 (5): 675–680. JSTOR 1303024.; A. PANNUCEUS Hoare, R.D.; Mapes, R.H. (1985). "A New Species of Pennsylvanian Polyplacophora (Mollusca) from Texas". Journal of Paleontology. 59 (5): 1324–1326. JSTOR 1305023.; A. ALLYNSMITHI HOARE, R. D., R. H. MAPES, AND D. E. ATWATER. 1983. Pennsylvanian Polyplacophora (Mollusca) from Oklahoma and Texas. Journal of Paleontology, 57:992-1000; A. depressolatus Hoare, Richard D. (June 1999). "New Occurrences and a New Species of Pennsylvanian Polyplacophorans (Mollusca) in Ohio". The Ohio Journal of Science. 99 (3): 49–52. hdl:1811/23819.; A. gracilis Hoare, R. D.; Plas, LEO P.; Yancey, T. E. (2002). "Permian Polyplacophora (Mollusca) from Nevada, Utah, and Arizona". Journal of Paleontology. 76 (2): 256. doi:10.1666/0022-3360(2002)076<0256:PPMFNU>2.0.CO;2. ISSN 0022-3360.; A. nevadensis Hoare, R. D.; Plas, LEO P.; Yancey, T. E. (2002). "Permian Polyplacophora (Mollusca) from Nevada, Utah, and Arizona". Journal of Paleontology. 76 (2): 256. doi:10.1666/0022-3360(2002)076<0256:PPMFNU>2.0.CO;2. ISSN 0022-3360.; A. etheridgei Smith, Allyn G.; Hoare, Richard D. (Feb 25, 1987). PALEOZOIC POLYPLACOPHORA: A CHECKLIST AND BIBLIOGRAPHY. Occasional Papers of the California Academy of Sciences. San Francisco: California Academy of Sciences. ASIN B00070YQGM. ISSN 0068-5461.

Extinct genus of molluscs

Acutichiton is among the most primitive genera of Neoloricate chitons. Acutichiton became extinct during the Carboniferous period. Articulated specimens are known.
