= Pedanochiton =

Pedanochiton Temporal range: Permian

Scientific classification
- Kingdom: Animalia
- Phylum: Mollusca
- Class: Polyplacophora
- Order: Lepidopleurida
- Family: Lepidopleuridae
- Genus: †Pedanochiton; Yochelson, Ellis L. (January 1971). "The Permian Nautiloid Mandible Rhynchoteuthis kaibabensis Reinterpreted as a Polyplacophoran". Journal of Paleontology. 45 (1): 130–133. JSTOR 1302760.

Extinct genus of molluscs

Pedanochiton is a genus of Permian Neoloricate chiton.
