= Septemchiton =

Septemchiton Temporal range: Ordovician

Scientific classification
- Domain: Eukaryota
- Kingdom: Animalia
- Phylum: Mollusca
- Class: Polyplacophora
- Order: †Paleoloricata
- Family: †Septemchitonidae
- Genus: †Septemchiton; Bergenhayn, 1955

Extinct genus of molluscs

Septemchiton is an extinct genus of polyplacophoran molluscs. Septemchiton became extinct during the Ordovician period.
