= Ivoechiton =

Ivoechiton Temporal range: Ordovician–Cretaceous

Scientific classification
- Domain: Eukaryota
- Kingdom: Animalia
- Phylum: Mollusca
- Class: Polyplacophora
- Order: †Paleoloricata
- Family: †Scanochitonidae
- Genus: †Ivoechiton

Extinct genus of molluscs

Ivoechiton is an extinct genus of polyplacophoran molluscs. Ivoechiton became extinct during the Cretaceous period.
