= Joyce Allan =

Australian artist (1896–1966)

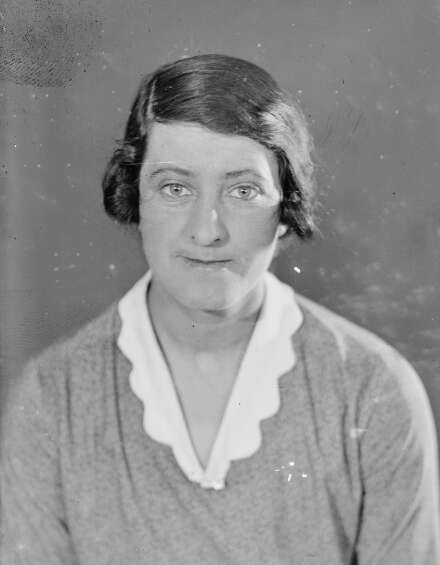
- Allan in the 1930s
- Born: 8 April 1896; Balmain, Sydney, Australia
- Died: 31 August 1966 (aged 70); Mosman, Australia
- Occupations: Conchologist, museum curator and scientific illustrator
- Spouse: Hector Walker Kirkpatrick

Joyce Allan (8 April 1896 – 31 August 1966) was an Australian conchologist, museum curator at the Australian Museum and a scientific illustrator.

== Early life and education ==
Allan was born Catherine Mabel Joyce Allan on 8 April 1896 in Balmain, Sydney. She was the eighth child of Florence Fountain Allan née Hesketh and Joseph Stuart Allan. Allan's education was initially private but she went on to attend Fort Street Girls' High School. During her time at secondary school she often visited the Australian Museum and would sort shells for Charles Hedley.

== Career ==
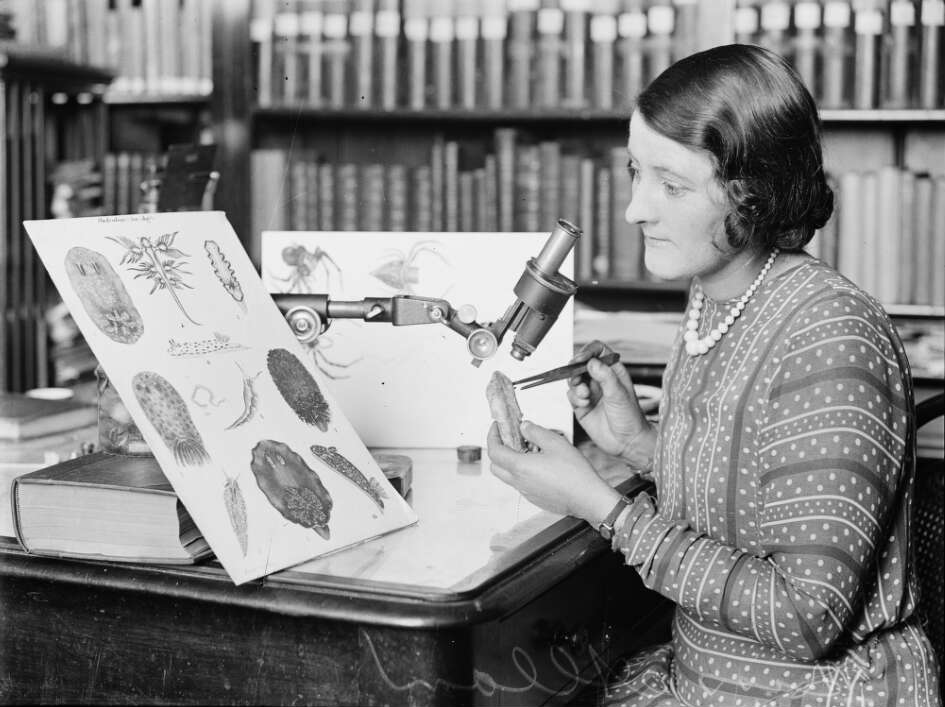
Allan examining specimens at the Australian Museum

Allan was appointed as a temporary employee at the Australia Museum in February 1917 and worked as an assistant to Charles Hedley. She was initially responsible for assisting with the curation of the conchology collection as well as providing illustrations for scientific papers written by other museum staff. Allan was a talented artist and exhibited artwork with the Royal Art Society of New South Wales. As time progressed she gained more expertise in molluscs and began writing scientific articles. She signed both her artwork and her scientific papers "Joyce K. Allan". Most of her published papers were related to the subclass Opisthobranchia.

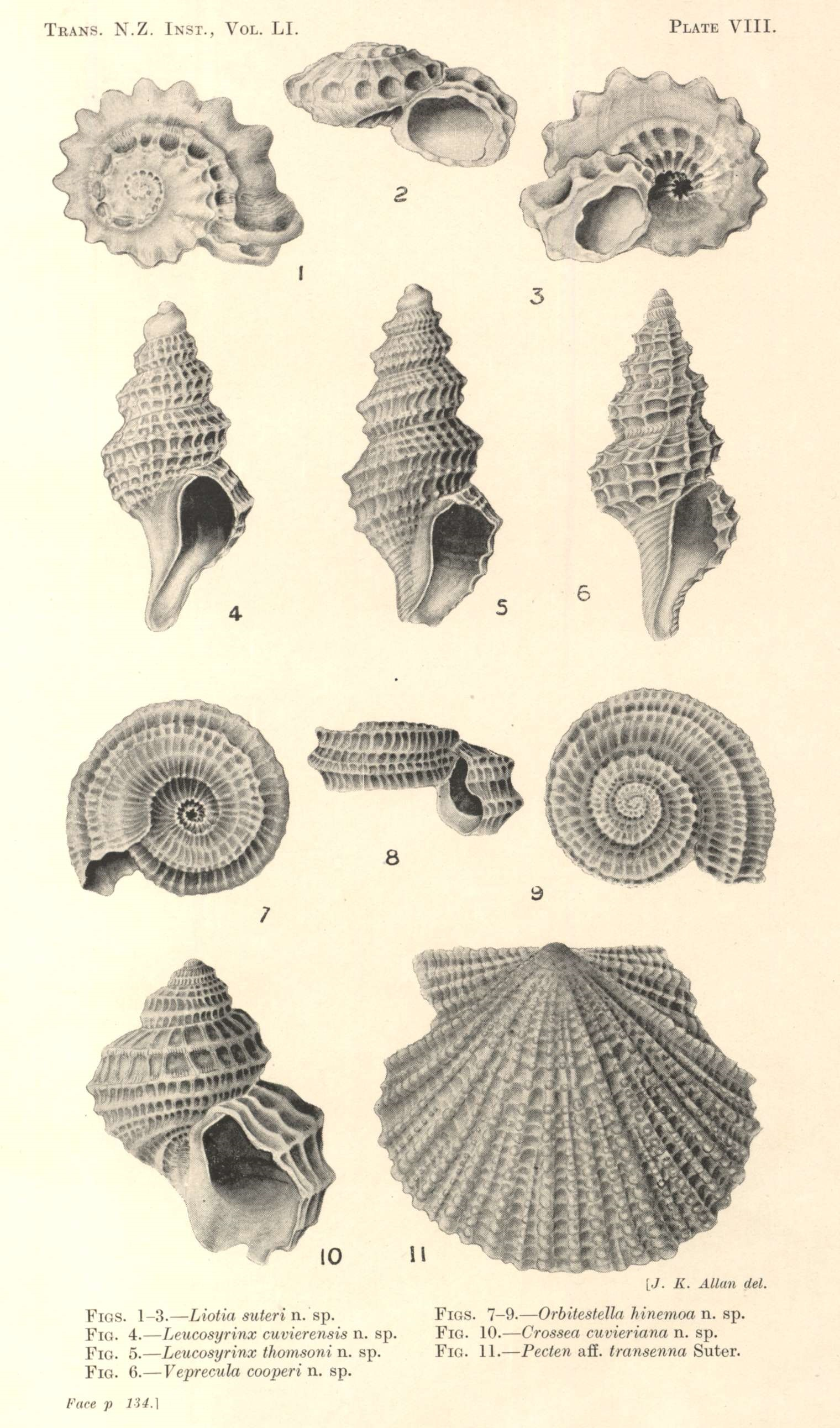
New Zealand Mollusca by Joyce K. Allan

In 1920 Allan obtained a permanent position at the museum, and upon the resignation of Hedley in 1924, was responsible for the Australia Museums's conchology section with Tom Iredale as her assistant. In 1925 Allan and Iredale's positions were reversed.

In addition to writing scientific papers on molluscs, Allan wrote articles in the Australian Museum Magazine and contributed to the Australian Encyclopaedia. She also undertook speaking engagements. Allan frequently appeared as the subject of articles in newspaper and magazines, not only as a result of being a woman scientist, but also because of her talent at science communication.

In 1931 Allan was appointed to the position of scientific assistant. During the Second World War she worked in the National Emergency Services and was appointed assistant to the superintendent of air-raid precautions. In 1943 Allan was elected a fellow of the Royal Zoological Society of New South Wales, and in doing so became the first woman to achieve this honour. In 1944 she returned to the Australia Museum and, upon the retirement of Iredale, was chosen to succeed him.

In early 1949 Allan was appointed curator of shells for the Museum and while holding that position attended gatherings of the Australian and New Zealand Association for the Advancement of Science. In 1949 she also attended the Pacific Science Congress in New Zealand and in 1953 travelled to Copenhagen to attend the International Congress of Zoology.

In 1950 Allan authored Australian Shells, the first book to attempt to describe the majority of Australian molluscs. It was well regarded by both the scientific community and mollusc collectors.

Allan retired from her position at the Museum of Australia in June 1956 as a result of suffering from ill health. However she was appointed an honorary zoologist and as such continued to work on a voluntary basis at the museum. She also authored further scientific texts. It was not until 1962 that she ceased working in any capacity at the museum.

== Personal life ==
On 18 May 1949 Allan married Hector Walker Kirkpatrick in St Clement's Anglican Church, Mosman. Joyce Allan's father Joseph Stuart Allan was a well-known artist in New Zealand and the UK, and contributed cartoons to the Australian magazine, The Bulletin, among many other publications. Joyce's grandfather was a noted artist and member of the Edinburgh Academy whilst working as a judge in Wellington.

== Death ==
Allan died on 31 August 1966 aged 70 at Mosman, of cerebrovascular disease. She was survived by her husband and was cremated.

== Selected publications ==
- 1936. Victorian sea shells : a handbook for collectors and students / by Charles J. Gabriel; with numerous illustrations by Joyce K. Allan Field Naturalists' Club of Victoria, Melbourne, Australia
- 1950. Australian shells, with related animals living in the sea, in fresh-water and on the land / by Joyce Allan. Georgian House Pty., Ltd., Melbourne, Australia
- 1956. Cowry Shells of World Seas / by Joyce Allan. Charles T. Branford Co., Boston
- 1958 The sea-horse and its relatives / by Gilbert Whitley and Joyce Allan.Georgian House, Melbourne, Australia

== Species named in honour of Joyce Allan ==
At least three shells, a fish and an insect have been named in Allan's honour. These include:

- Coralastele allanea Iredale, 1930
- Microcanthus joycei Whitley, 1931
- Phosinella allanae Laseron, 1950
