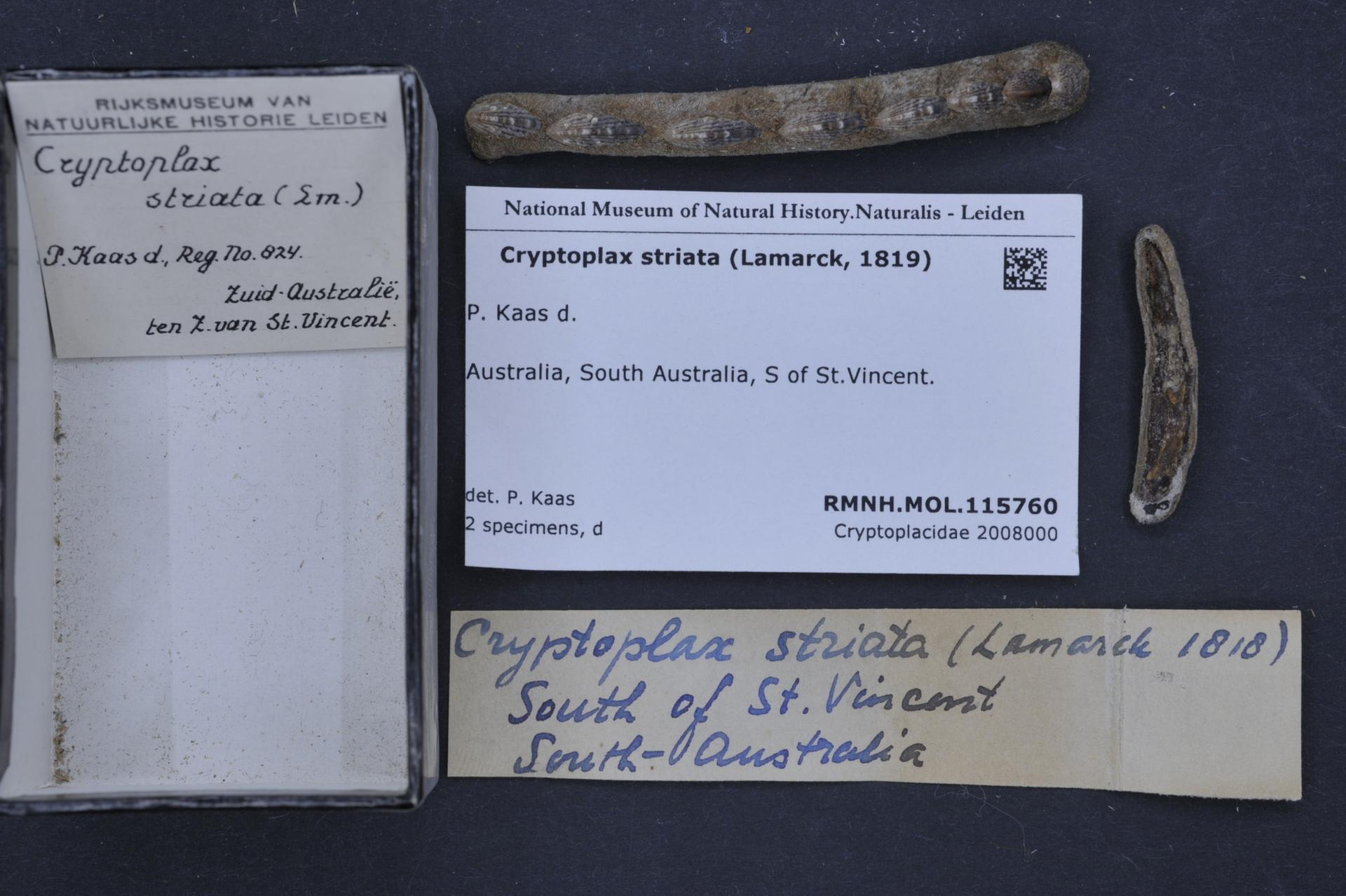

Scientific classification
- Domain: Eukaryota
- Kingdom: Animalia
- Phylum: Mollusca
- Class: Polyplacophora
- Order: Chitonida
- Family: Cryptoplacidae
- Genus: Cryptoplax
- Species: C. striata

Binomial name
- Cryptoplax striata (Lamarck, 1819)

= Cryptoplax striata =

Species of mollusc

Cryptoplax striata, commonly known as the striate leathery chiton is a species of chiton in the genus Cryptoplax that lives under rocks and in crevices in the intertidal and subtidal waters of southern Australia. It grows to 120 mm long and has a brown, leathery appearance with tiny non-articulated shell valves.
