= Pseudischnochiton =

Pseudischnochiton Temporal range: Miocene

Scientific classification
- Domain: Eukaryota
- Kingdom: Animalia
- Phylum: Mollusca
- Class: Polyplacophora
- Order: Lepidopleurida
- Family: Leptochitonidae
- Subfamily: †Helminthochitoninae
- Genus: †Pseudischnochiton

Extinct genus of molluscs

Pseudischnochiton is an extinct genus of polyplacophoran molluscs. Pseudischnochiton became extinct during the Miocene period.
