= Lirachiton =

Lirachiton Temporal range: Pliocene

Scientific classification
- Kingdom: Animalia
- Phylum: Mollusca
- Class: Polyplacophora
- Order: Lepidopleurida
- Suborder: Lepidopleurina
- Family: †Afossochitonidae
- Genus: †Lirachiton

Synonyms
- Acanthochiton (Lirachiton) Ashby & Cotton, 1939; † Acanthochitona (Lirachiton) Ashby & Cotton, 1939

Extinct genus of molluscs

Lirachiton is an extinct genus of polyplacophoran molluscs. Lirachiton became extinct in the Pliocene period.

== Species ==
- † Lirachiton inexpectus (Ashby & Cotton, 1939)
