= Kindbladochiton =

Kindbladochiton Temporal range: Ordovician

Scientific classification
- Domain: Eukaryota
- Kingdom: Animalia
- Phylum: Mollusca
- Class: Polyplacophora
- Order: †Paleoloricata
- Family: †Scanochitonidae
- Genus: †Kindbladochiton

Extinct genus of molluscs

Kindbladochiton is an extinct genus of polyplacophoran molluscs. Kindbladochiton became extinct during the Ordovician period.
