= Scanochiton =

Scanochiton Temporal range: Late cretaceous

Scientific classification
- Kingdom: Animalia
- Phylum: Mollusca
- Class: Polyplacophora
- Order: †Paleoloricata
- Family: †Scanochitonidae
- Genus: †Scanochiton; AG Smith, 1973

Species
- †Scanochiton jugatus Bergenhayn, 1943

Extinct genus of molluscs

Scanochiton is an extinct genus of polyplacophoran molluscs. Scanochiton became extinct during the Cretaceous period.
