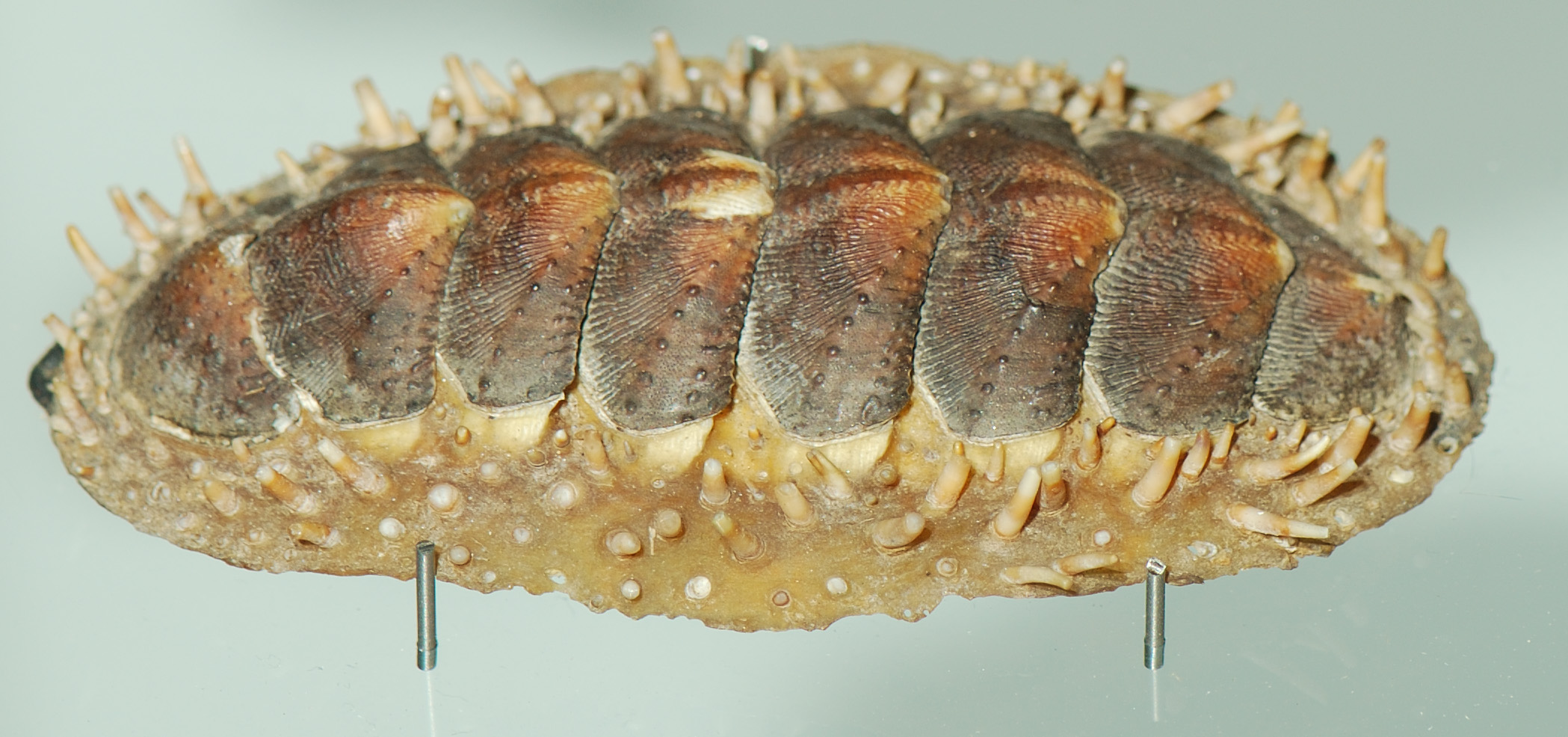
- A mounted specimen of Acanthopleura spinosa, anterior end to the left

Scientific classification
- Kingdom: Animalia
- Phylum: Mollusca
- Class: Polyplacophora
- Order: Chitonida
- Family: Chitonidae
- Subfamily: Acanthopleurinae
- Genus: Acanthopleura; Guilding, 1829

Species
- 8, see text.

= Acanthopleura =

Genus of molluscs

Acanthopleura is a genus of chitons in the family Chitonidae. In this genus the girdle is spiny or spiky. It has eight described species at present.

== Species ==
According to the World Register of Marine Species (WoRMS), species in the genus Acanthopleura:

- Acanthopleura gemmata (de Blainville, 1825)
- Acanthopleura granulata (Gmelin, 1791)
- Acanthopleura loochooana (Broderip & Sowerby, 1829)
- Acanthopleura planispina Bergenhayn, 1933
- Acanthopleura spinosa (Bruguiere, 1792)
- Acanthopleura tenuispinosa (Leloup, 1939)
- Acanthopleura testudo (Spengler, 1797)
- Acanthopleura vaillantii de Rochebrune, 1882
