= Cymatochiton =

Cymatochiton Temporal range: Carboniferous–Permian

Scientific classification
- Domain: Eukaryota
- Kingdom: Animalia
- Phylum: Mollusca
- Class: Polyplacophora
- Order: Lepidopleurida
- Family: Leptochitonidae
- Subfamily: †Helminthochitoninae
- Genus: †Cymatochiton

Extinct genus of molluscs

Cymatochiton is an extinct genus of polyplacophoran molluscs. Cymatochiton became extinct during the Permian period.

Species:

- Chiton loftusianus (King, 1848) = Cymatochiton loftusianus (King, 1848)
- Rhynchoteuthis kaibabensis (Brady, 1955) = 6Cymatochiton kaibabensis (Brady, 1955)
