= Lilian Marguerite Medland =

Australian artist (1880–1955)

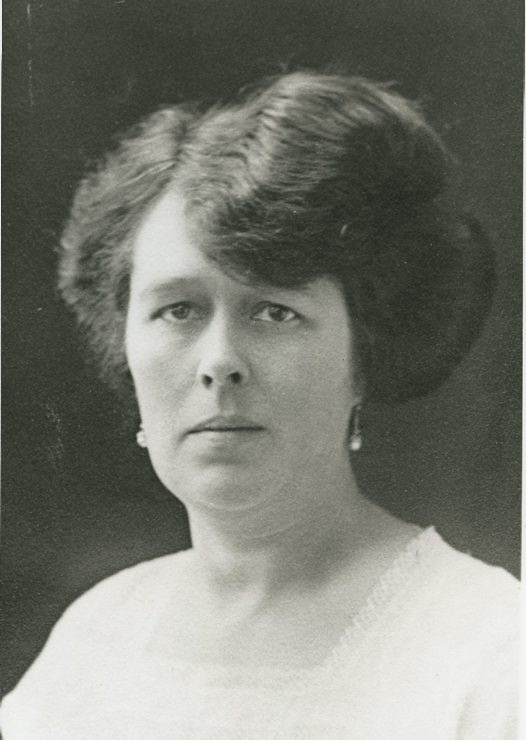
- Born: Lilian Marguerite Medland; 29 May 1880; London, United Kingdom
- Died: 16 December 1955 (aged 75); Queenscliffe, Australia
- Known for: Illustrator
- Spouse: Tom Iredale (m. 1923)

Lilian Marguerite Medland (29 May 1880 – 16 December 1955) was an English-born nurse and Australian illustrator of books on birds. She produced paintings to illustrate Gregory Mathews' books on Australian birds. She also illustrated the plates for her husband Tom Iredale's books Birds of Paradise and Bower Birds (1950) and Birds of New Guinea (1956).

== Biography ==
Lilian Marguerite Medland was born on 29 May 1880 in London, England. She trained as a nurse at Guy's Hospital in London. In her late twenties, Medland became almost completely deaf as a result of an attack of diphtheria.

Medland moved to Sydney, Australia, in 1923, the same year she married Tom Iredale.

Lilian Medland's mother was Ada Emmeline Cranstone, niece of Lefevre James Cranstone. Ada Emmeline was a pupil at the school run by Lefevre James' wife, Lillia Messenger, in Hemel Hempstead, where Lefevre James taught art.

== Career ==
In 1925 Medland painted a series bird for the Australian Museum. The series of thirty species of birds was published as postcards.

She illustrated a variety of books and articles, including plates for her husband's books.

== Works ==
- The Birds Of The British Isles Volumes I – V (London, 1906)
- Birds of Paradise and Bower Birds (Melbourne, 1950)
- Birds of New Guinea (Melbourne, 1956)

== Selected works ==
Illustrations for an unpublished book on New Zealand birds, approximately 1934

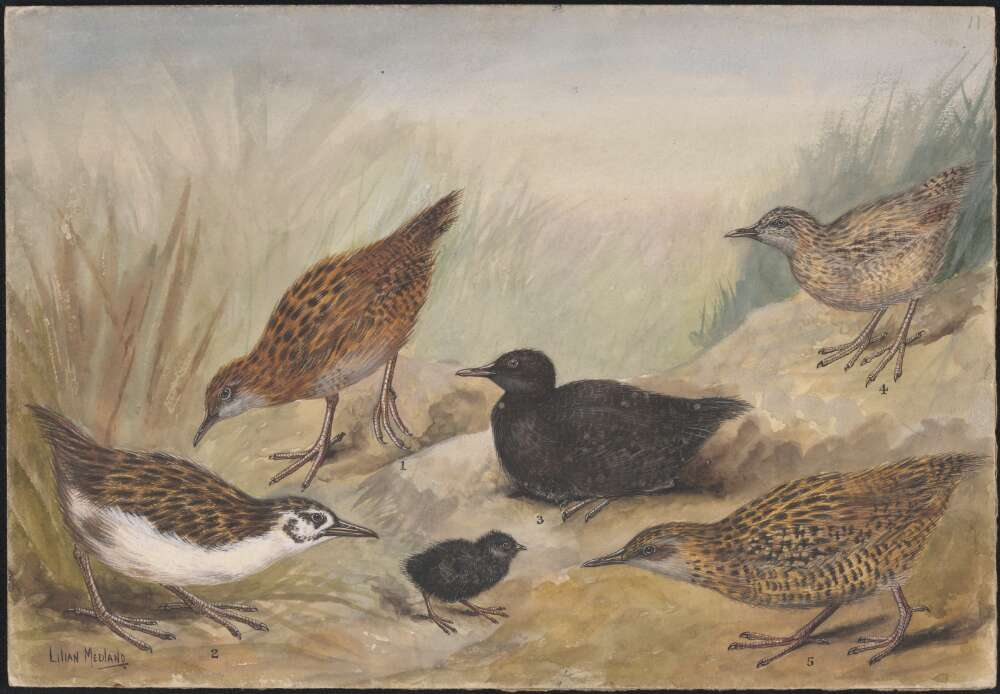
Weka bird species , National Library of Australia

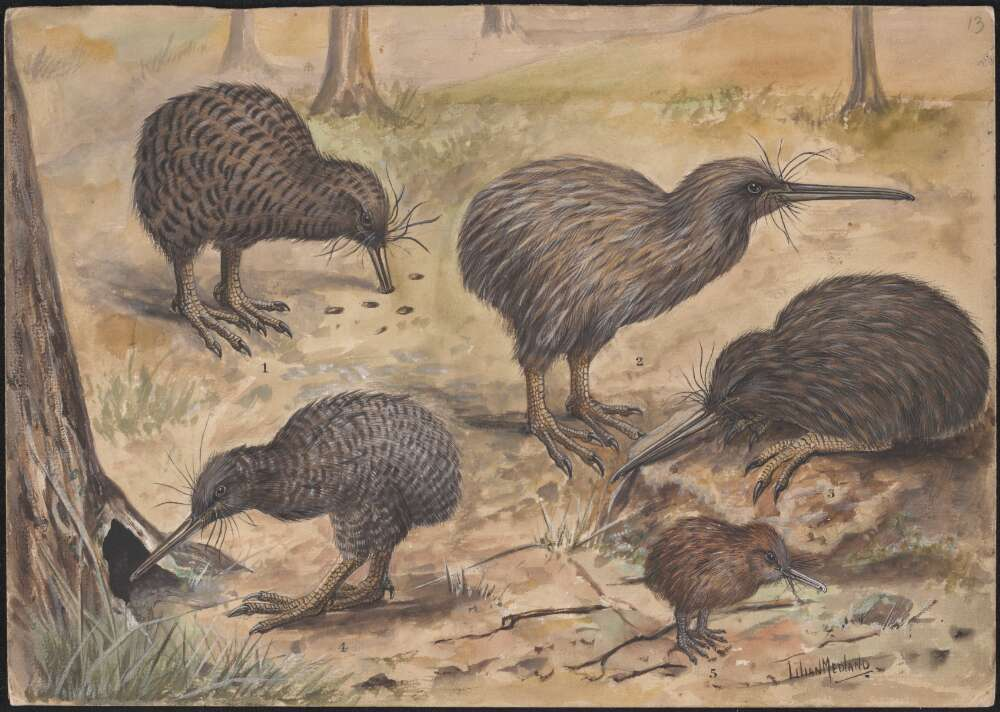
Kiwi bird species, National Library of Australia

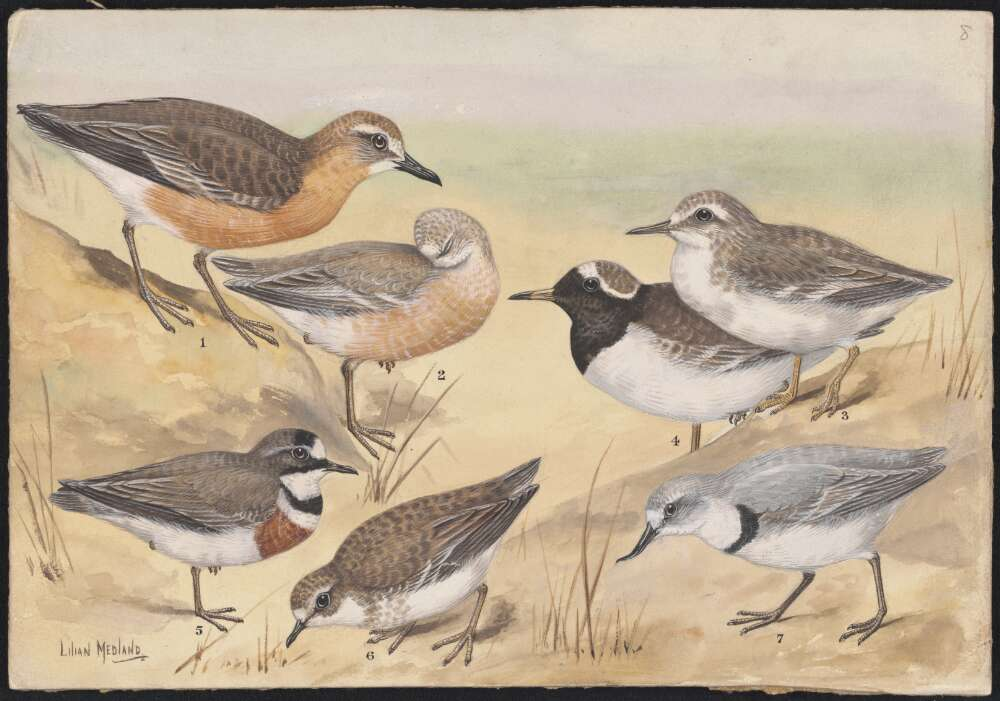
Plover bird species, National Library of Australia

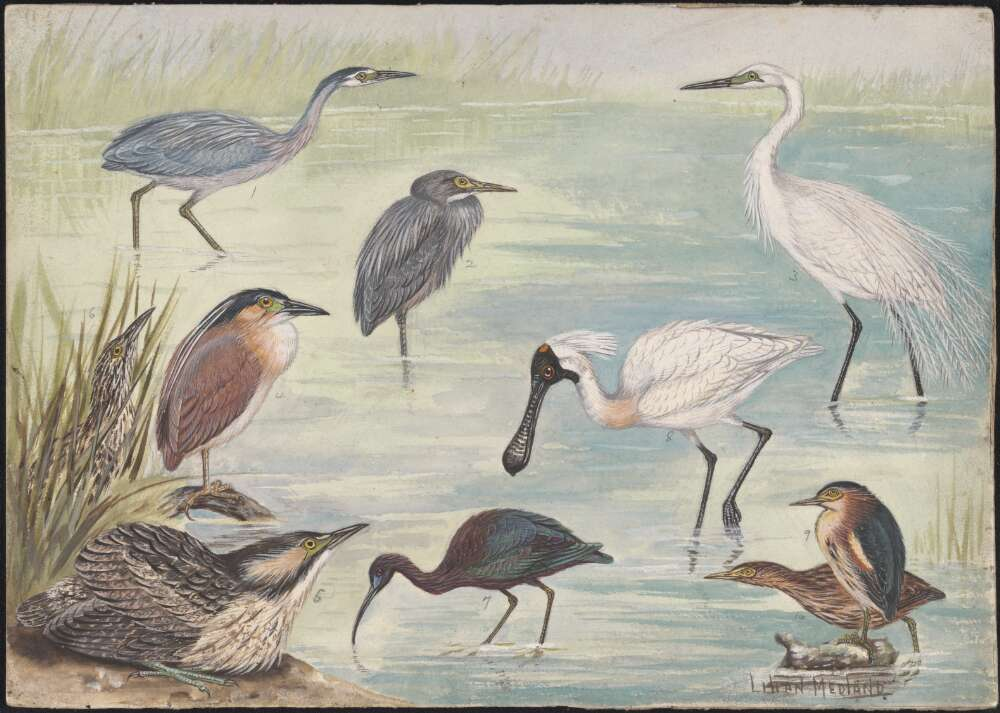
Heron, bittern and other bird species, National Library of Australia

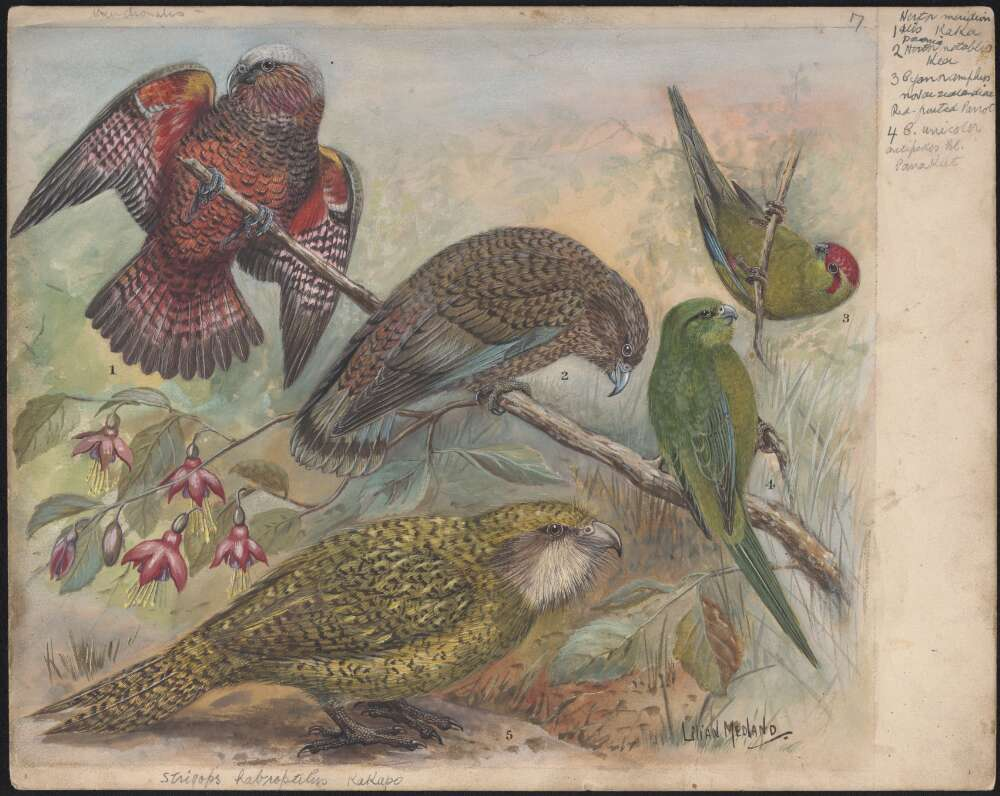
Parrot and parakeet bird species, National Library of Australia

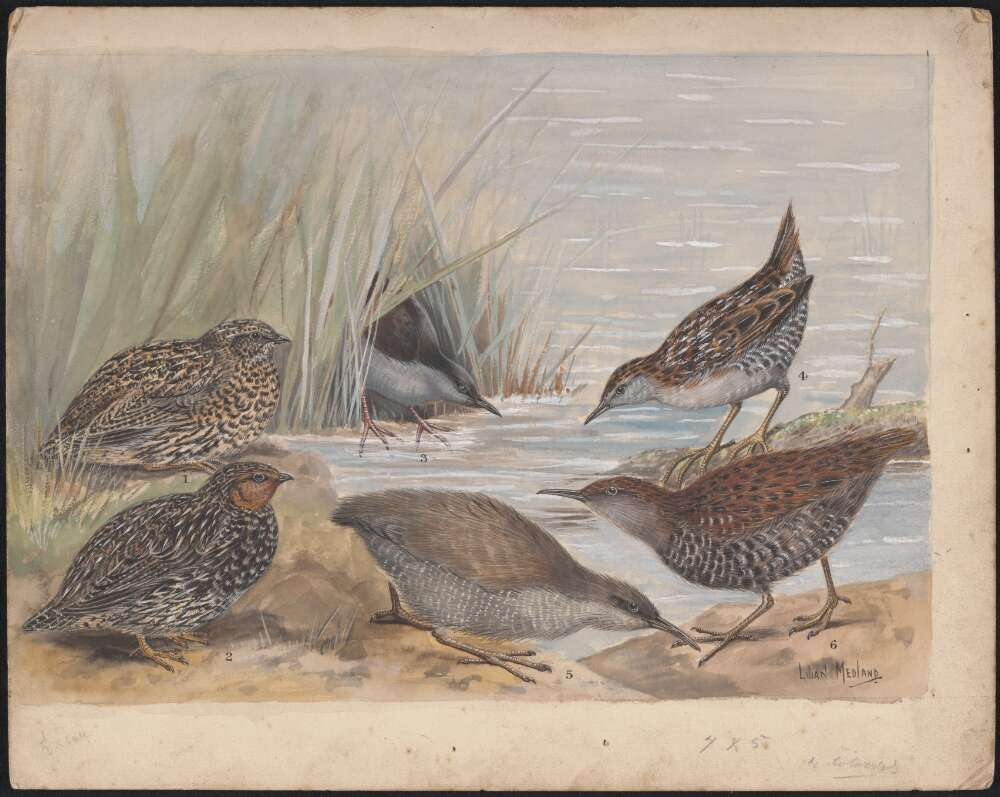
Quail, crake and rail bird species, National Library of Australia
