= Afossochiton =

Afossochiton Temporal range: Oligocene–Pliocene

Scientific classification
- Domain: Eukaryota
- Kingdom: Animalia
- Phylum: Mollusca
- Class: Polyplacophora
- Order: Lepidopleurida
- Family: †Afossochitonidae
- Genus: †Afossochiton

Genus of molluscs

Afossochiton is an extinct genus of polyplacophoran molluscs. Afossochiton became extinct during the Pliocene period.
