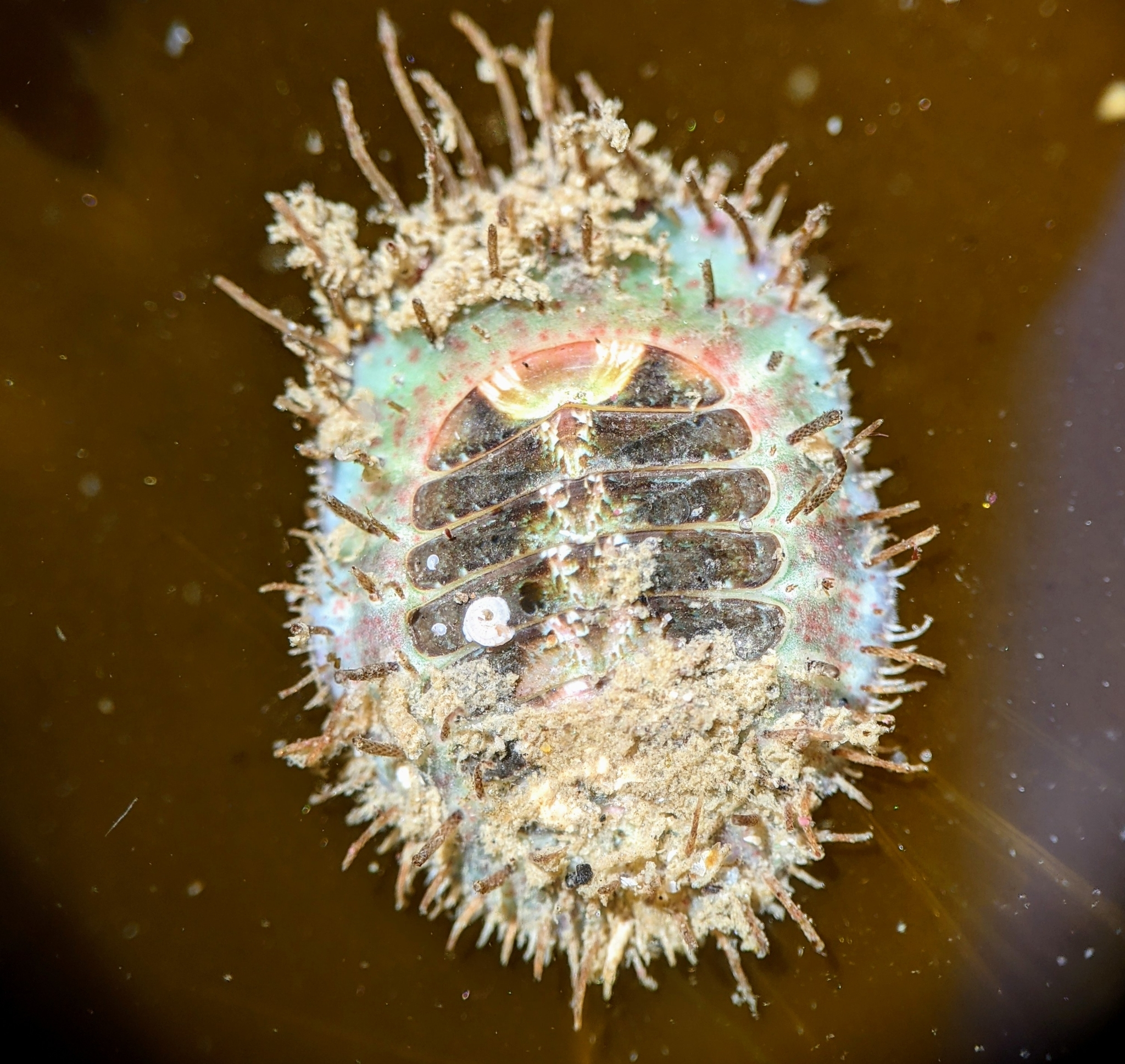
- Placiphorella velata

Scientific classification
- Kingdom: Animalia
- Phylum: Mollusca
- Class: Polyplacophora
- Order: Chitonida
- Family: Mopaliidae
- Subfamily: Mopaliinae
- Genus: Placiphorella; Dall, 1879

= Placiphorella =

Genus of molluscs

Placiphorella, the veiled chiton, is a genus of polyplacophoran molluscs with precephalic tentacles, which are used in feeding.

== Species ==
Species in the genus Placiphorella include the following:

- Placiphorella albitestae Is. Taki, 1954
- Placiphorella atlantica (A. E. Verrill & S. Smith, 1882)
- Placiphorella blainvillii (Broderip, 1832)
- Placiphorella borealijaponica H. Saito & Okutani, 1989
- Placiphorella borealis Pilsbry, 1893
- Placiphorella hanselmani R. N. Clark, 1994
- Placiphorella isaotakii H. Saito, Fujikura & Tsuchida, 2008
- Placiphorella laurae R. N. Clark, 2019
- Placiphorella methanophila Vončina, 2024
- Placiphorella mirabilis R. N. Clark, 1994
- Placiphorella okutanii H. Saito, Fujikura & Tsuchida, 2008
- Placiphorella pacifica S. S. Berry, 1919
- Placiphorella rufa S. S. Berry, 1917
- Placiphorella stimpsoni (A. Gould, 1859)
- Placiphorella velata (Dall, 1879)

== See also ==
Image
