= Paleochiton =

Paleochiton Temporal range: Ordovician

Scientific classification
- Domain: Eukaryota
- Kingdom: Animalia
- Phylum: Mollusca
- Class: Polyplacophora
- Order: †Paleoloricata
- Family: †Chelodidae
- Genus: †Paleochiton; A. G. Smith, 1964

Extinct genus of molluscs

Paleochiton is an extinct genus of polyplacophoran molluscs.
