= Trachypleura =

Trachypleura Temporal range: Triassic

Scientific classification
- Domain: Eukaryota
- Kingdom: Animalia
- Phylum: Mollusca
- Class: Polyplacophora
- Order: Lepidopleurida
- Family: Leptochitonidae
- Subfamily: †Helminthochitoninae
- Genus: †Trachypleura

Extinct genus of molluscs

Trachypleura is an extinct genus of polyplacophoran molluscs. Trachypleura became extinct during the Triassic period.
