= Mesochiton =

Mesochiton Temporal range: Jurassic

Scientific classification
- Domain: Eukaryota
- Kingdom: Animalia
- Phylum: Mollusca
- Class: Polyplacophora
- Order: Lepidopleurida
- Family: Leptochitonidae
- Subfamily: †Helminthochitoninae
- Genus: †Mesochiton

Extinct genus of molluscs

Mesochiton is an extinct genus of polyplacophoran molluscs. Mosochiton became extinct during the Jurassic period.
