= Aulochiton =

Aulochiton Temporal range: Upper Cambrian

Scientific classification
- Domain: Eukaryota
- Kingdom: Animalia
- Phylum: Mollusca
- Class: Polyplacophora
- Order: †Paleoloricata
- Family: †Aulochitonidae
- Genus: †Aulochiton; Pojeta et al., 2010

Extinct genus of molluscs

Aulochiton is a genus of upper Cambrian chitons with a circular head valve.
