= Afossochitonidae =

Scientific classification
- Domain: Eukaryota
- Kingdom: Animalia
- Phylum: Mollusca
- Class: Polyplacophora
- Order: Lepidopleurida
- Suborder: Lepidopleurina
- Family: †Afossochitonidae

Genera
- Glyptochiton De Koninck, 1883; Afossochiton Ashby, 1925; Lirachiton Ashby & Cotton, 1939

Extinct family of molluscs

Afossochitonidae is an extinct family of polyplacophoran mollusc.
