= Pterygochiton =

Pterygochiton Temporal range: Carboniferous

Scientific classification
- Domain: Eukaryota
- Kingdom: Animalia
- Phylum: Mollusca
- Class: Polyplacophora
- Order: Lepidopleurida
- Family: Leptochitonidae
- Subfamily: †Helminthochitoninae
- Genus: †Pterygochiton

Extinct genus of molluscs

Pterygochiton is an extinct genus of polyplacophoran molluscs. Pterygochiton became extinct during the Carboniferous period.
