= Glyptochiton =

Glyptochiton Temporal range: Carboniferous

Scientific classification
- Kingdom: Animalia
- Phylum: Mollusca
- Class: Polyplacophora
- Order: Lepidopleurida
- Family: †Afossochitonidae
- Genus: †Glyptochiton

Extinct genus of molluscs

Glyptochiton is an extinct genus of polyplacophoran mollusc. Glyptochiton became extinct during the Carboniferous period.
