= Lavenachiton =

Lavenachiton Temporal range: Miocene

Scientific classification
- Domain: Eukaryota
- Kingdom: Animalia
- Phylum: Mollusca
- Class: Polyplacophora
- Order: Chitonida
- Suborder: Acanthochitonina
- Family: incertae sedis
- Genus: †Lavenachiton

Extinct genus of molluscs

Lavenachiton is an extinct genus of polyplacophoran mollusc of uncertain taxonomic placement.
