= Pterochiton =

Pterochiton Temporal range: Carboniferous

Scientific classification
- Domain: Eukaryota
- Kingdom: Animalia
- Phylum: Mollusca
- Class: Polyplacophora
- Order: Lepidopleurida
- Family: Leptochitonidae
- Subfamily: †Helminthochitoninae
- Genus: †Pterochiton; Torrey et Frémont, 1845

Extinct genus of molluscs

Pterochiton is an extinct genus of polyplacophoran molluscs.
