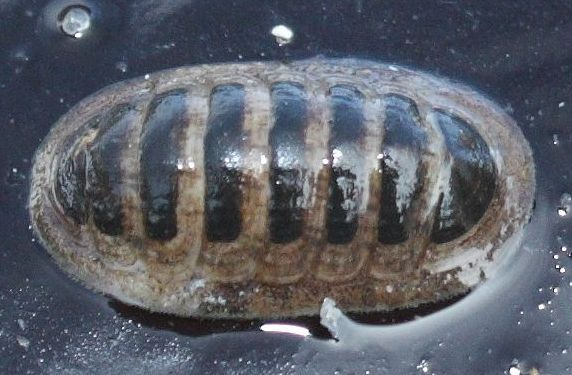
- Leptochiton asellus

Scientific classification
- Domain: Eukaryota
- Kingdom: Animalia
- Phylum: Mollusca
- Class: Polyplacophora
- Order: Lepidopleurida
- Suborder: Lepidopleurina; Thiele, 1910

Families
- Leptochitonidae; Protochitonidae; Hanleyidae; Afossochitonidae

= Lepidopleurina =

Extinct suborder of molluscs

Lepidopleurina is a suborder of polyplacophoran molluscs. It includes both extinct and extant species.
