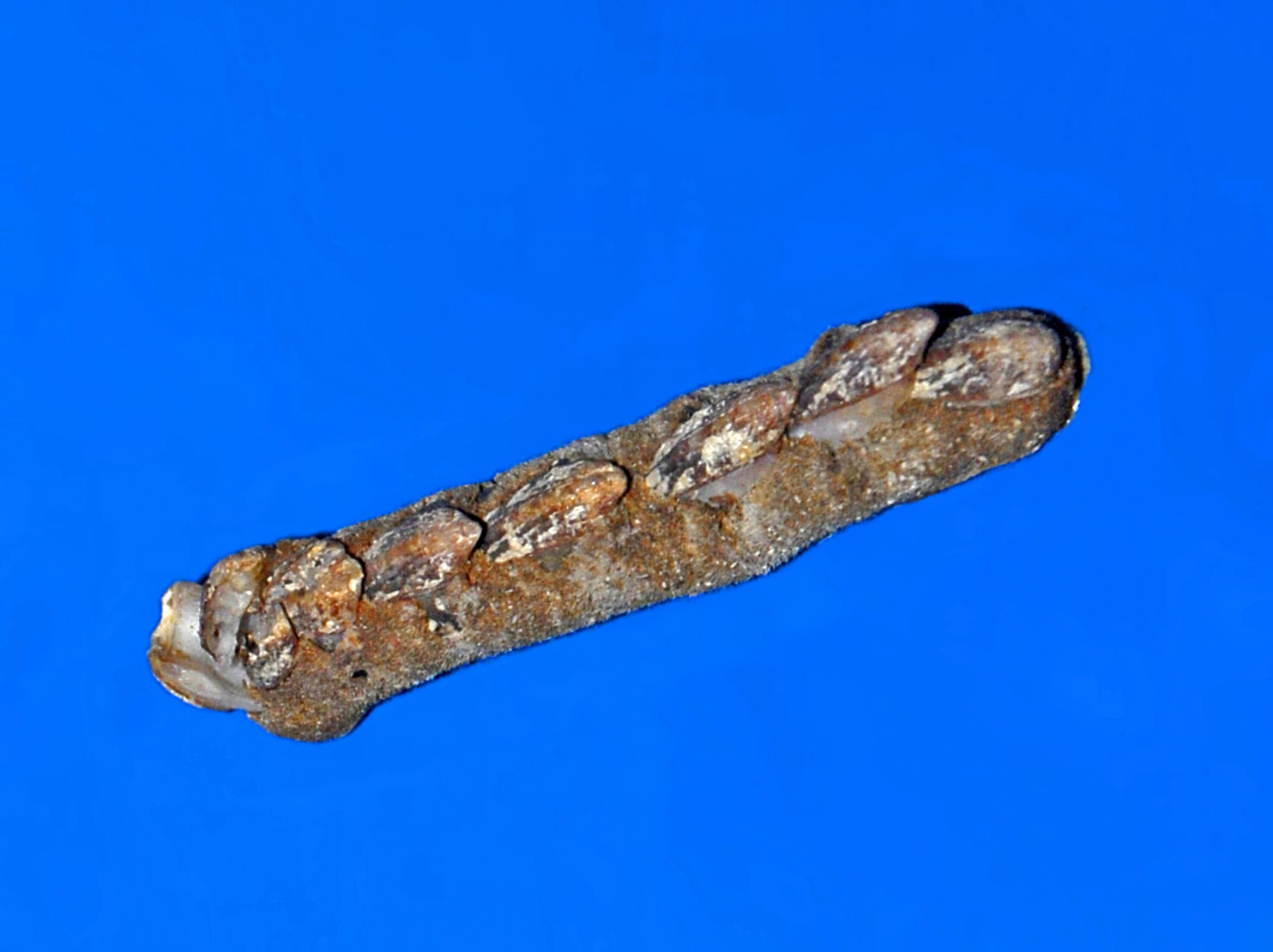
- Cryptoplax iredalei. Museum specimen

Scientific classification
- Domain: Eukaryota
- Kingdom: Animalia
- Phylum: Mollusca
- Class: Polyplacophora
- Order: Chitonida
- Family: Cryptoplacidae
- Genus: Cryptoplax; De Blainville, 1818

Species
- See text.

= Cryptoplax =

Cryptoplax Temporal range: Miocene–Holocene

Genus of molluscs

Cryptoplax is a genus of polyplacophoran molluscs. The genus consists of the following living species:

- Cryptoplax burrowi E. A. Smith, 1884
- Cryptoplax caledonicus Rochebrune, 1882
- Cryptoplax dawydoffi Leloup, 1937
- Cryptoplax dimidiata Ang, 1967
- Cryptoplax dupuisi Ashby, 1931
- Cryptoplax elioti Pilsbry, 1901
- Cryptoplax hartmeyeri Thiele, 1911
- Cryptoplax iredalei Ashby, 1923
- Cryptoplax japonica Pilsbry, 1901
- Cryptoplax larvaeformis Burrow, 1815
- Cryptoplax mystica Iredale & Hull, 1925
- Cryptoplax oculata Quoy & Gaimard, 1835
- Cryptoplax plana Ang, 1967
- Cryptoplax propior Is. & Iw. Taki, 1930
- Cryptoplax royana Iredale & Hull, 1925
- Cryptoplax striata Lamarck, 1819
- Cryptoplax sykesi Thiele, 1909
