= Tom Iredale =

British-born Australian naturalist

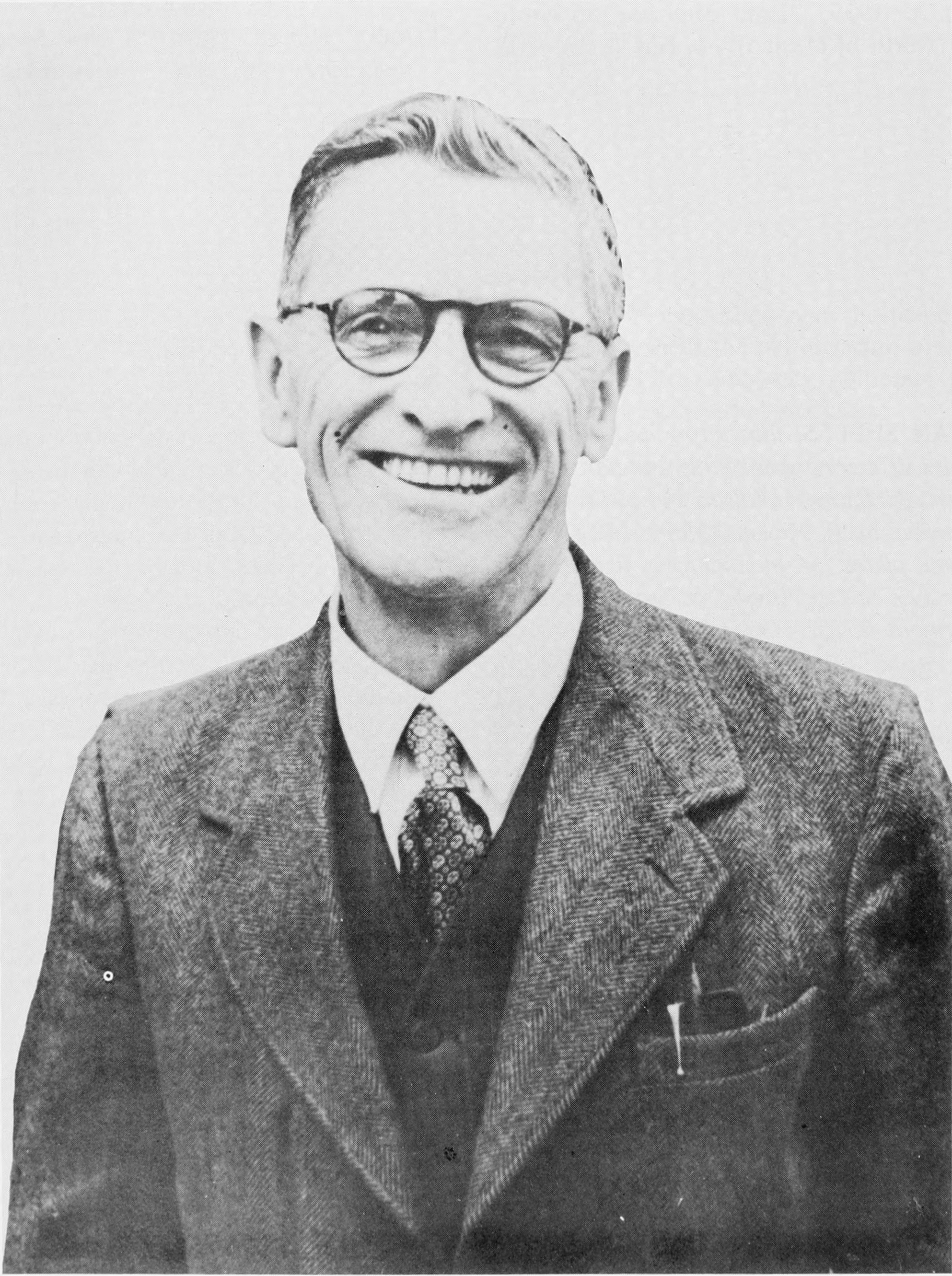
- Iredale in 1938
- Born: 24 March 1880; Workington, England
- Died: 12 April 1972 (aged 92); Harbord, Australia
- Spouse: Lilian Marguerite Medland (m. 1923)
- Awards: Clarke Medal (1959)
- Scientific career
- Fields: malacology, ornithology
- Author abbrev. (zoology): Iredale

Tom Iredale (24 March 1880 – 12 April 1972) was an English-born ornithologist and malacologist who had a long association with Australia, where he lived for most of his life. He was an autodidact who never went to university and lacked formal training. This was reflected in his later work; he never revised his manuscripts and never used a typewriter.

== Early life ==
Iredale was born at Stainburn, Workington in Cumberland, England. He was apprenticed to a pharmacist from 1899 to 1901, and used to go bird watching and egg collecting in the Lake District with fellow chemist William Carruthers Lawrie.

== New Zealand ==
Iredale emigrated to New Zealand following medical advice, as he had health issues. He may have had tuberculosis. According to a letter to Will Lawrie dated 25 January 1902, he arrived in Wellington, New Zealand in December 1901, and travelled at once on to Lyttelton and Christchurch. On his second day in Christchurch, he discovered that in the Foreign Natural History Gallery of the Museum and Public Library, 2 of 16 English birds' eggs were wrongly identified – red grouse egg labelled as sandpiper, and moorhen labelled water rail.

Iredale became a clerk in a New Zealand company at Christchurch (1902–1907). On 16 April 1906 he married Alice Maud Atkinson in New Zealand, and they had one child, Ida.

== Kermadec Islands ==
In 1908 Iredale joined an expedition to the Kermadec Islands and lived for ten months on these remote islands northeast of New Zealand. Living among and studying thousands of birds, he became a bird expert. He survived by shooting and eating the objects of his study. He also collected molluscs on the island and developed an interest in malacology. As a keen naturalist in those times, he already had a broad interest in nature, but this marked a new turn in his career.

== Queensland ==
In 1909 he visited Queensland, Australia, collecting about 300 species of chitons and other molluscs. His reputation among his peers was growing, despite the fact that he had no university degree.

== Britain ==
Iredale returned to Britain and became a freelance worker at the British Museum of Natural History in London (1909–1910). There he worked as the assistant of Gregory Mathews on the book Birds of Australia (1911–1923). He wrote much of the text, but the work was credited to Mathews.

Whilst working in London he lived with Jane Davies, a concert singer, whom he met at a Rothschild's soiree in 1910. The relationship was affected by his explorations abroad although a son and four daughters were born between 1910 and 1917. The son died in infancy.

Iredale continued his work in natural history under the patronage of wealthy naturalists such as Charles Rothschild, for whom he travelled to Hungary to collect fleas from birds. He married Lilian Marguerite Medland (1880–1955) on 8 June 1923. She illustrated several of his books and became one of Australia's finest bird artists.

== New South Wales ==
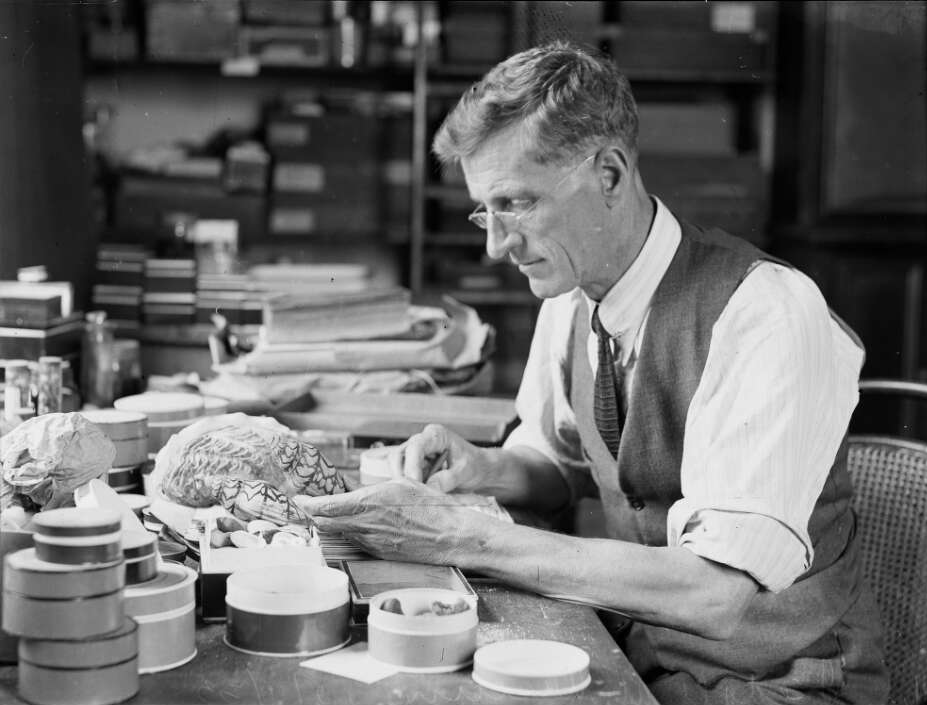
Studying shells at the Australian Museum, 1933

Iredale returned to Australia in 1923 and was elected a member of the Royal Australasian Ornithologists Union (RAOU) in the same year. He was a RAOU Councillor for New South Wales in 1926, and served on the RAOU Migration Committee 1925–1932.

He took up a position as a conchologist at the Australian Museum in Sydney (1924–1944). Iredale was originally appointed to assist Joyce Allan, the temporary head of the Conchology department. However their positions were reversed in 1925. He worked tirelessly on publications on shells, birds, ecology and zoogeography. He lectured frequently and wrote many popular scientific articles in newspapers. Due to his efforts (and those of later curators), the Mollusc Section at the Australian Museum now maintains the largest research collection of molluscs in the Southern Hemisphere with over 6,000 specimens. He was an Honorary Associate from his retirement in 1944 until his death.

== Taxa ==
Iredale recorded a list of around on thousand systematic names he had published by 1932, chronologically arranged and indexed to the relevant work, this unpublished list became the basis for the one produced for the Australian Museum and published in The Australian zoologist (1956). detailing the works of Iredale's fifty-year career. This list, produced as tribute to the still active author, brought the total number of names to over two and a half thousand, and noted his other publications and collaborators.

Many species and several genera in conchology, ichthyology and ornithology were also named in honour of Iredale, including:

- The molluscan genus Iredalea W. Oliver, 1915
- Cryptoplax iredalei E. Ashby, 1923

Iredale was made a Fellow of the Royal Zoological Society of New South Wales in 1931; was awarded the Clarke Medal of the Royal Society of New South Wales in 1959; and was President of the Royal Zoological Society of New South Wales in 1937–38.

== Selected works ==
A selection of publications written by Iredale include:

- Iredale, T., 'Solander as an Ornithologist', Ibis, 1913, pp. 127–135
- Iredale, T., 'John Brazier 1842–1930', Nautilus, vol. 44, 1931
- Iredale, T., 'J. R. and G. Forster, Naturalists', Emu, vol. 37, 1937, pp. 95–99
- Iredale, T. 1940. Book review. The fishes of Australia. Part I by G. P. Whitley. Proceedings of the RZS of NSW 1939–40: 41.
- Iredale, T. 1941. Book review. The molluscs of South Australia. Part II by B. C. Cotton & F. K. Godfrey. Proceedings of the RZS of NSW 1940–41: 35.
- Iredale, T. 1942. Book review. Australian Insects. An introductory handbook by Keith C. McKeown. Proceedings of the RZS of NSW 1941–42: 33–34.
- Iredale, T. 1947. Book review. Gliders of the gum trees. The most beautiful and enchanting Australian marsupials by David Fleay. Proceedings of the RZS of NSW 1947-47: 5.
- Iredale, T. 1951. Book review. Australian shells by Joyce Allan. Proceedings of the RZS of NSW 1949–50: 73–74.
- Iredale, T. 1958. Book review. Cowry Shells of World Seas by Joyce Allan. Proceedings of the RZS of NSW 1956–57: 95–96.
- Birds of Paradise and Bower Birds (1950)
- Birds of New Guinea, 1956 (Vol.1, 2), Illustrated with 35 plates in colour figuring 347 birds by Lilian Medland
- Iredale, T., 'John (William) Brazier', Proceedings of the Royal Zoological Society of New South Wales, 1956, p. 105
- Iredale, T., 'Broinowski's Birds and Mammals of Australia', Proceedings of the Royal Zoological Society of New South Wales, 1956
- Iredale, T., 'Scientific Societies in Australia. The Sydney University Chemical Society', The Royal Australian Chemical Institute Proceedings, vol. 27, 1960, pp. 216–217
- Iredale, T. and Whitley, G.P., 'Sir William Dennison as a Conchologist', Proceedings of the Royal Zoological Society of New South Wales, 1964, pp. 27–30
- Iredale, T., 'Charles Hedley', Proceedings of the Royal Zoological Society of New South Wales, vol. 88, 1967, pp. 26–31

Awards
| Preceded by T. G. B. Osborn | Clarke Medal; 1959 | Succeeded by A. B. Edwards |
