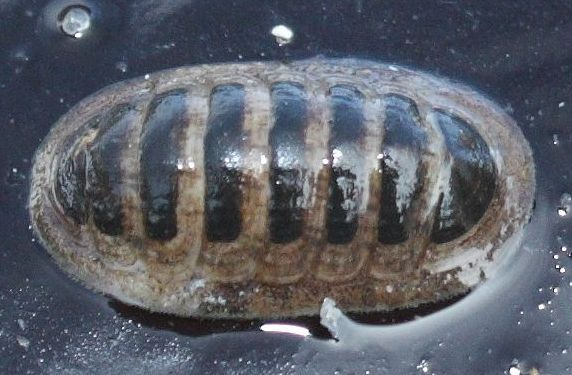
- Leptochiton asellus

Scientific classification
- Domain: Eukaryota
- Kingdom: Animalia
- Phylum: Mollusca
- Class: Polyplacophora
- Order: Lepidopleurida
- Suborder: Lepidopleurina
- Family: Leptochitonidae; Dall, 1889

Genera
- Subfamily Helminthochitoninae; Helminthochiton Salter, 1846; Pterochiton Dall, 1882; Cymatochiton Dall, 1882; Pterygochiton De Rochebrune, 1883; Trachypleura Jawkel, 1900; Permochiton Iredale & Hull, 1926; Pseudischnochiton Ashby, 1930; Acutichiton Hoare et al, 1972; Mesochiton Van Belle, 1975; Subfamily Leptochitoninae; Lepidopleurus Risso, 1826; Leptochiton Gray, 1847; Parachiton Thiele, 1909

Synonyms
- Lepidopleuridae

= Leptochitonidae =

Family of molluscs

Leptochitonidae is a family of polyplacophoran mollusc. While the subfamily Leptochitoninae has both extant and extinct species, all members of Helminthochitoninae are extinct.
