= Paleoloricata =

Paleoloricata Temporal range: Upper Cambrian – Cretaceous

Scientific classification
- Domain: Eukaryota
- Kingdom: Animalia
- Phylum: Mollusca
- Class: Polyplacophora
- Order: †Paleoloricata; Bergenhayn, 1955

Included families
- Suborder Chelodina; Chelodidae; Scanochitonidae; Suborder Septemchitonina; Septemchitonidae; Other families; Mattheviidae Walcott, 1885; Aulochitonidae Pojeta et al, 2010

Extinct order of molluscs

The Paleoloricata are valved polyplacophora without sutural laminae or insertion plates (as found in the neoloricata). The "order" probably represents a paraphyletic grouping.
