= List of marine molluscs of Ireland =

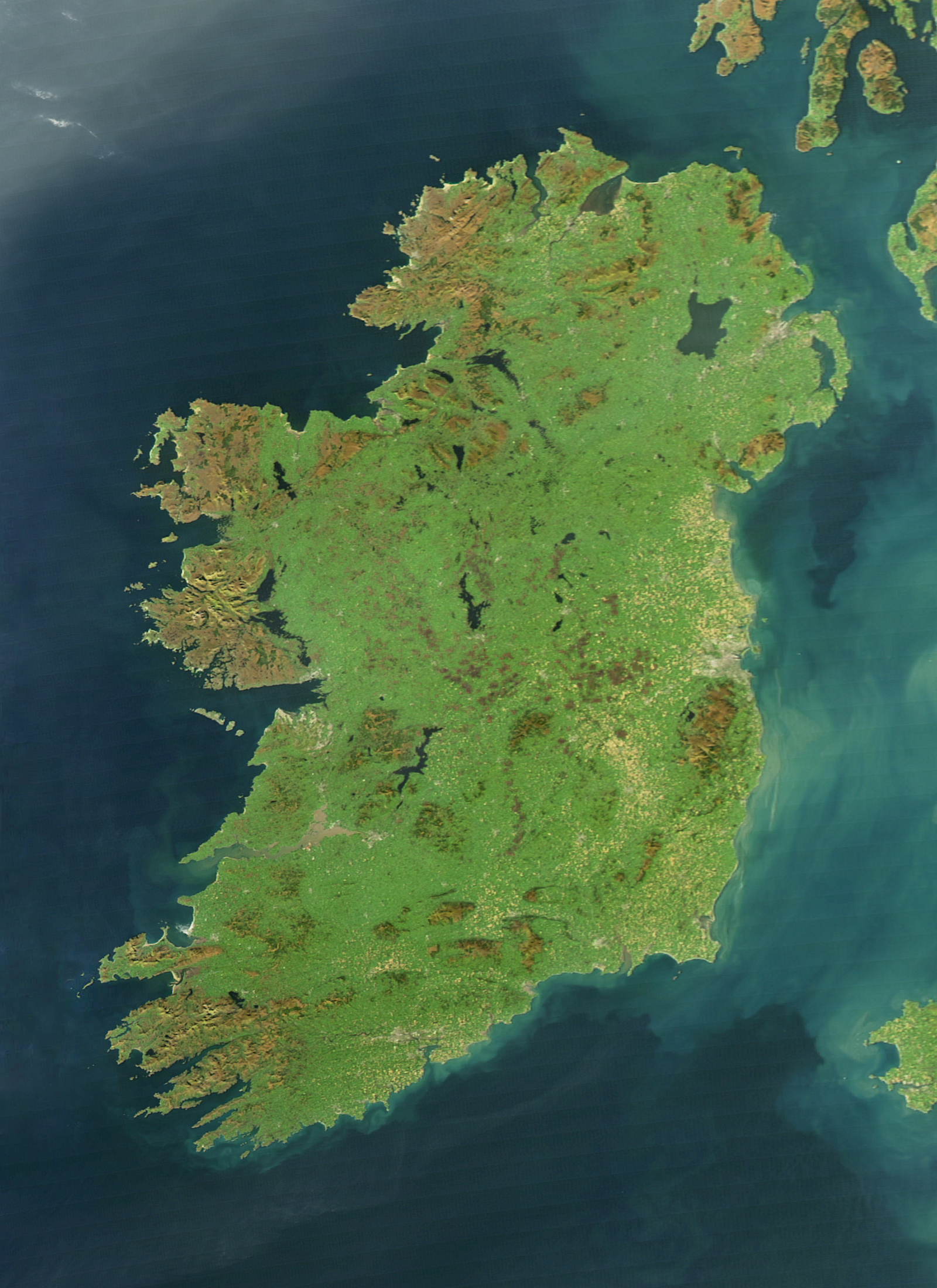
Ireland

The list of marine molluscs of Ireland is a list of marine species that form a part of the molluscan fauna of Ireland.

Their habitats include littoral, mesopelagic, pelagic, oceanic zone, benthic, deep ocean water and deep sea.

== Class Aplacophora (worm-like molluscs) ==
=== Subclass Solenogastres ===
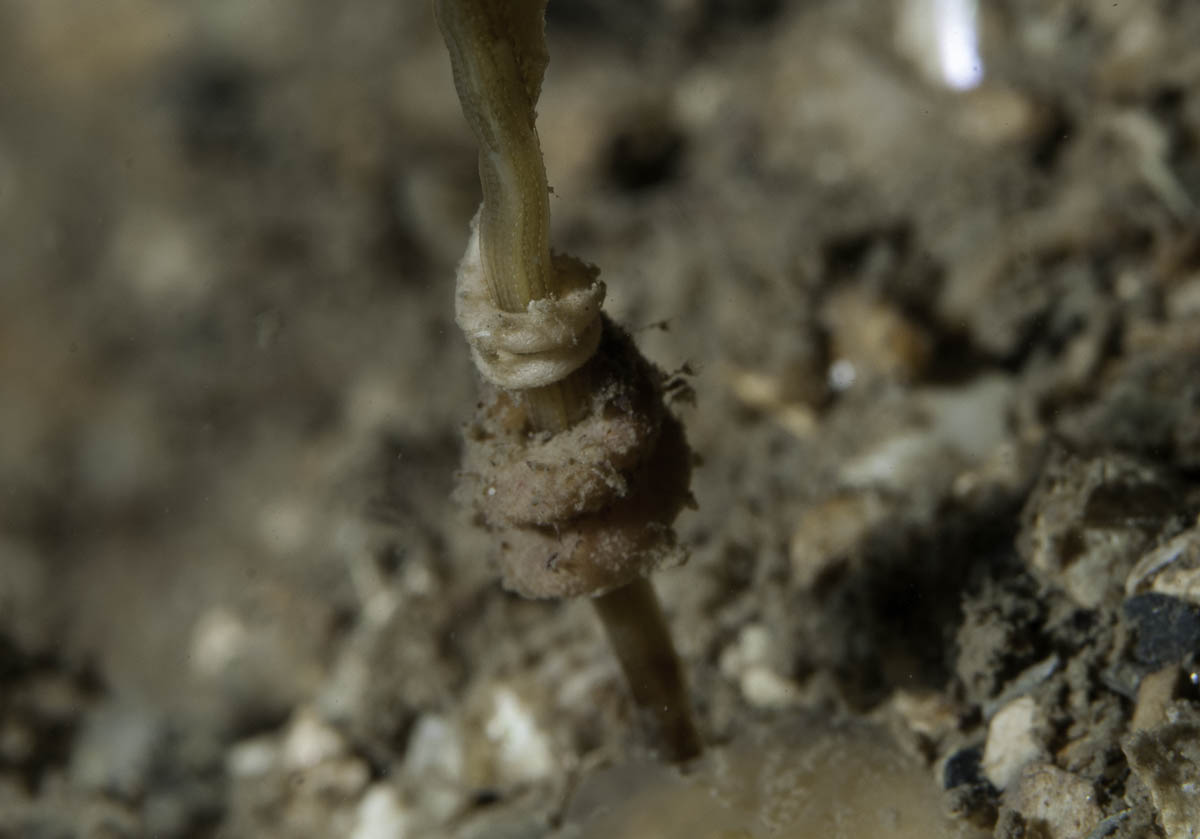
Rhopalomenia aglaopheniae

There were recorded at least 2 species of solenogastres in Ireland.

Family Rhopalomeniidae

- Rhopalomenia aglaopheniae (Kowalewsky & Marion, 1887)

Family Neomeniidae

- Neomenia carinata Tullberg, 1875

=== Subclass Caudofoveata ===
There was recorded at least 1 species of Caudofoveata in Ireland.

Family Chaetodermatidae

- Chaetoderma nitidulum Lovén, 1844

== Class Polyplacophora (sea cradles, loricates) ==
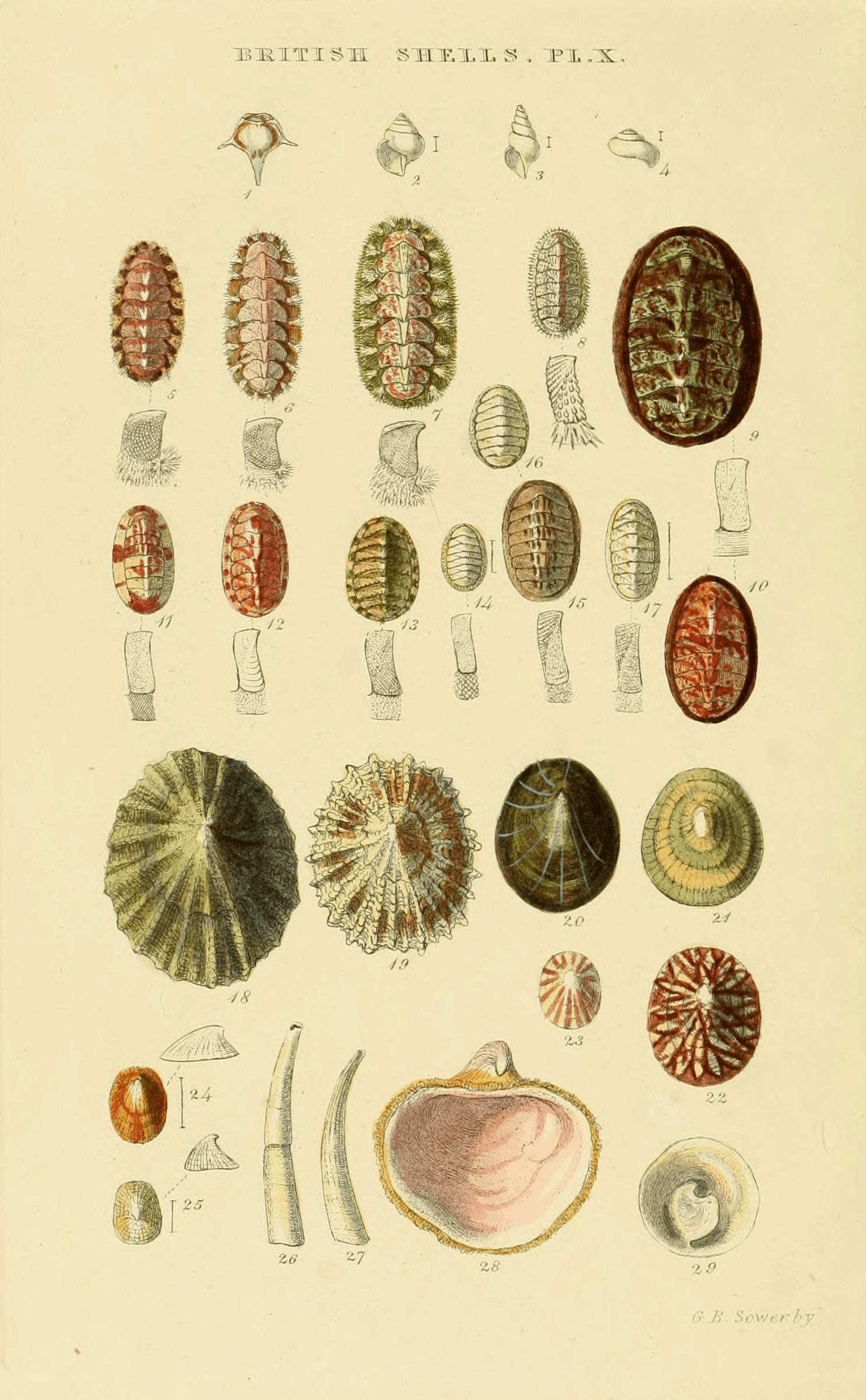
Chitons (Polyplacophora) and other marine shells

There were recorded at least 13 species of polyplacophorans in Ireland.

Family Acanthochitonidae

- Acanthochitona crinita (Pennant, 1777)
- Acanthochitona discrepans (Brown, 1827)
- Acanthochitona fascicularis (Linnaeus, 1767)

Family Ischnochitonidae

- Lepidochitona cinerea (Linnaeus, 1767)
- Tonicella marmorea (Fabricius, 1780)
- Tonicella rubra (Linnaeus, 1767)

Family Leptochitonidae

- Callochiton achatinus (Brown, 1827)
- Callochiton septemvalvis (Montagu, 1803)
- Hanleya hanleyi (Bean in Thorpe, 1844)
- Lepidopleurus asellus (Gmelin, 1791)
- Lepidopleurus cancellatus (Sowerby, 1839)
- Leptochiton asellus (Gmelin, 1791)
- Leptochiton cancellatus (G. B. Sowerby II, 1840)

== Class Scaphopoda (tusk shells, tooth shells) ==
There were recorded at least 2 species of tusk shells in Ireland.

Family Dentaliidae

- Antalis entalis (Linnaeus, 1758)
- Antalis vulgaris (da Costa, 1778)

== Class Cephalopoda (inkfish) ==
There were recorded at least 5 species of cephalopods in Ireland.

Family Octopodidae (most octopuses)

- Eledone cirrhosa (Lamarck, 1798)
- Octopus vulgaris Cuvier, 1797

Family Sepiolidae

- Rossia macrosoma (Delle Chiaje, 1829)
- Sepiola atlantica d'Orbigny, 1839

Family Architeuthidae (giant squid)

- Architeuthis dux Steenstrup, 1857

== See also ==
- List of non-marine molluscs of Ireland

Lists of molluscs of surrounding countries:

- List of non-marine molluscs of Great Britain
- List of marine molluscs of Island
