= Chaetoderma elegans =

Scientific classification
- Domain: Eukaryota
- Kingdom: Animalia
- Phylum: Mollusca
- Class: Caudofoveata
- Order: Chaetodermatida
- Family: Chaetodermatidae
- Genus: Chaetoderma
- Species: C. elegans

Binomial name
- Chaetoderma elegans Scheltema, 1997

Species of mollusc

Chaetoderma elegans is a species of glisten worm, a kind of shell-less, worm-like mollusc in the family Chaetodermatidae. This species is found in the Eastern Pacific Ocean.
