= Acanthochitona thileniusi =

Scientific classification
- Kingdom: Animalia
- Phylum: Mollusca
- Class: Polyplacophora
- Order: Chitonida
- Family: Acanthochitonidae
- Genus: Acanthochitona
- Species: A. thileniusi

Binomial name
- Acanthochitona thileniusi (Thiele, 1909)

Synonyms
- Acanthochites thileniusi Thiele, 1909

Species of mollusc

Acanthochitona thileniusi is a very rare species of chiton in the family Acanthochitonidae. The only specimens have been found in Tauranga Harbour in New Zealand.
