= Lepoderma =

Lepoderma may refer to:

- Lepoderma, a genus of molluscs in the family Chaetodermatidae, synonym of Falcidens
- Lepoderma, a genus of flatworms in the family Plagiorchiidae, synonym of Plagiorchis
