= Limifossoridae =

Scientific classification
- Domain: Eukaryota
- Kingdom: Animalia
- Phylum: Mollusca
- Class: Caudofoveata
- Order: Chaetodermatida
- Family: Limifossoridae; Salvini-Plawen, 1970

Synonyms
- Metachaetodermatidae

Family of molluscs

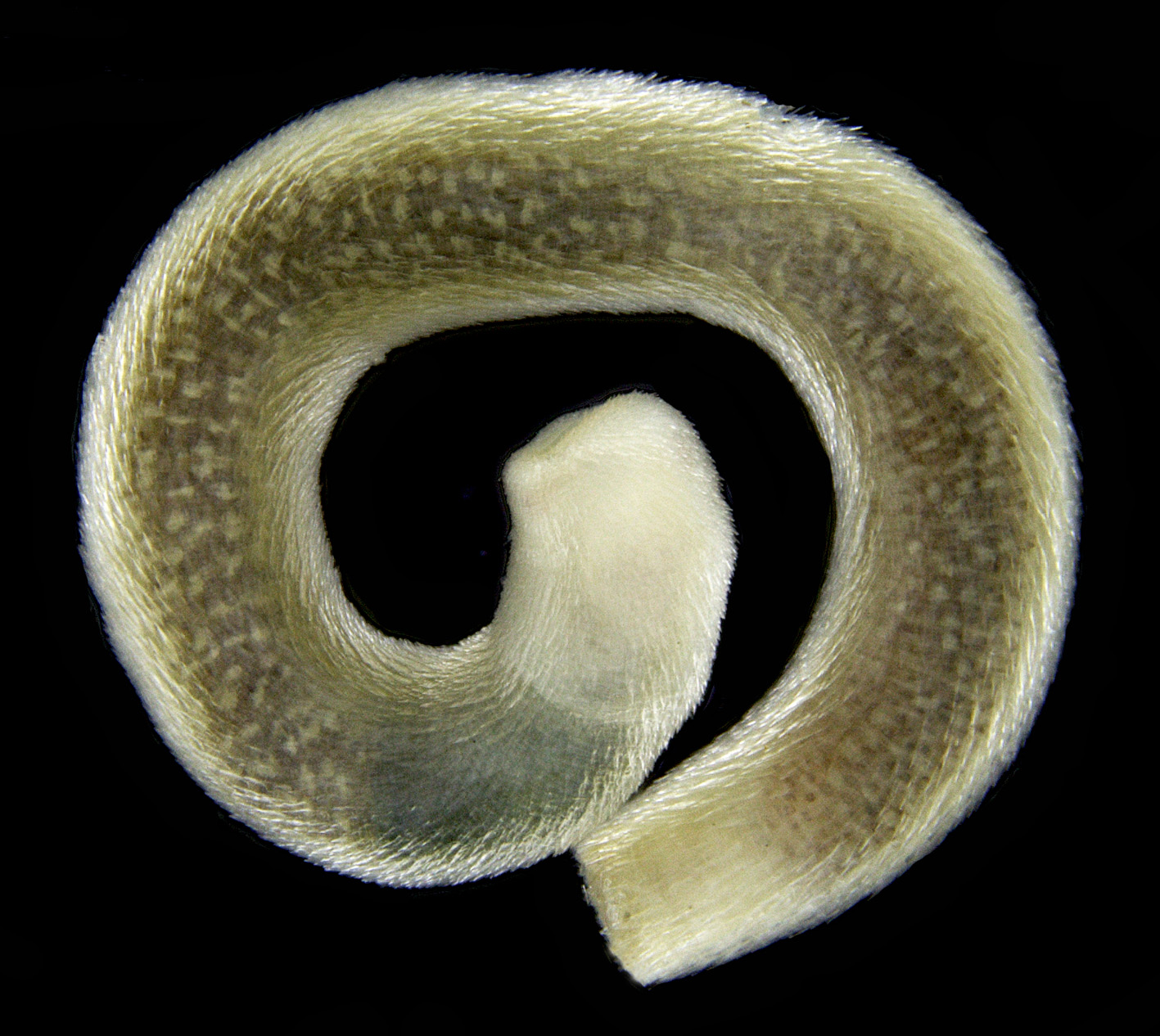

Limifossoridae is a family of molluscs belonging to the class Caudofoveata, order Chaetodermatida.

Genera:

- Limifossor Heath, 1904
- Metachaetoderma Thiele, 1913
- Psilodens Salvini-Plawen, 1977
- Scutopus Salvini-Plawen, 1968
