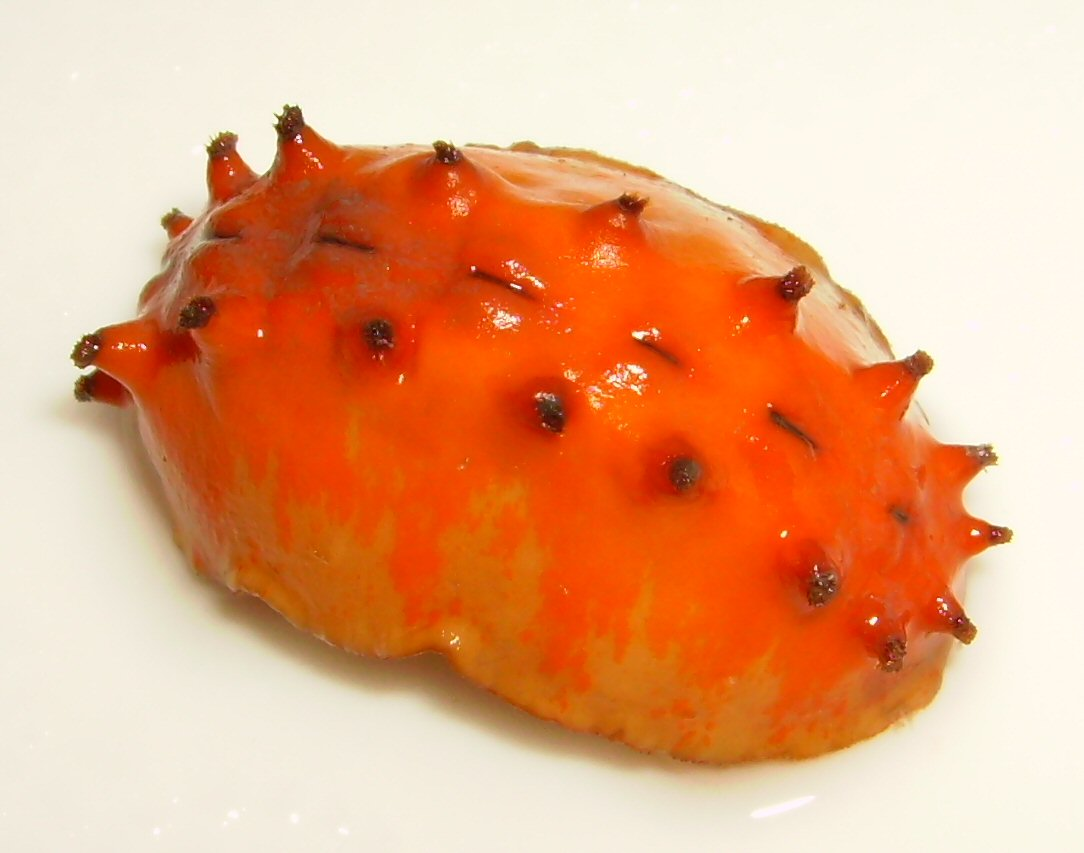
- Cryptoconchus porosus from Auckland, New Zealand

Scientific classification
- Kingdom: Animalia
- Phylum: Mollusca
- Class: Polyplacophora
- Order: Chitonida
- Family: Acanthochitonidae
- Genus: Cryptoconchus
- Species: C. porosus

Binomial name
- Cryptoconchus porosus (Burrow, 1815)

Synonyms
- Cryptoplax depressus Blainville, 1818; Chiton leachi Blainville, 1825; Chiton monticularis Quoy and Gaimard, 1835; Cryptoconchus stewartianus Rochebrune, 1882; Acanthochites porosus Suter, 1913

= Cryptoconchus porosus =

Species of mollusc

Cryptoconchus porosus, the butterfly chiton, is a species of chiton, a marine polyplacophoran mollusc in the family Acanthochitonidae.

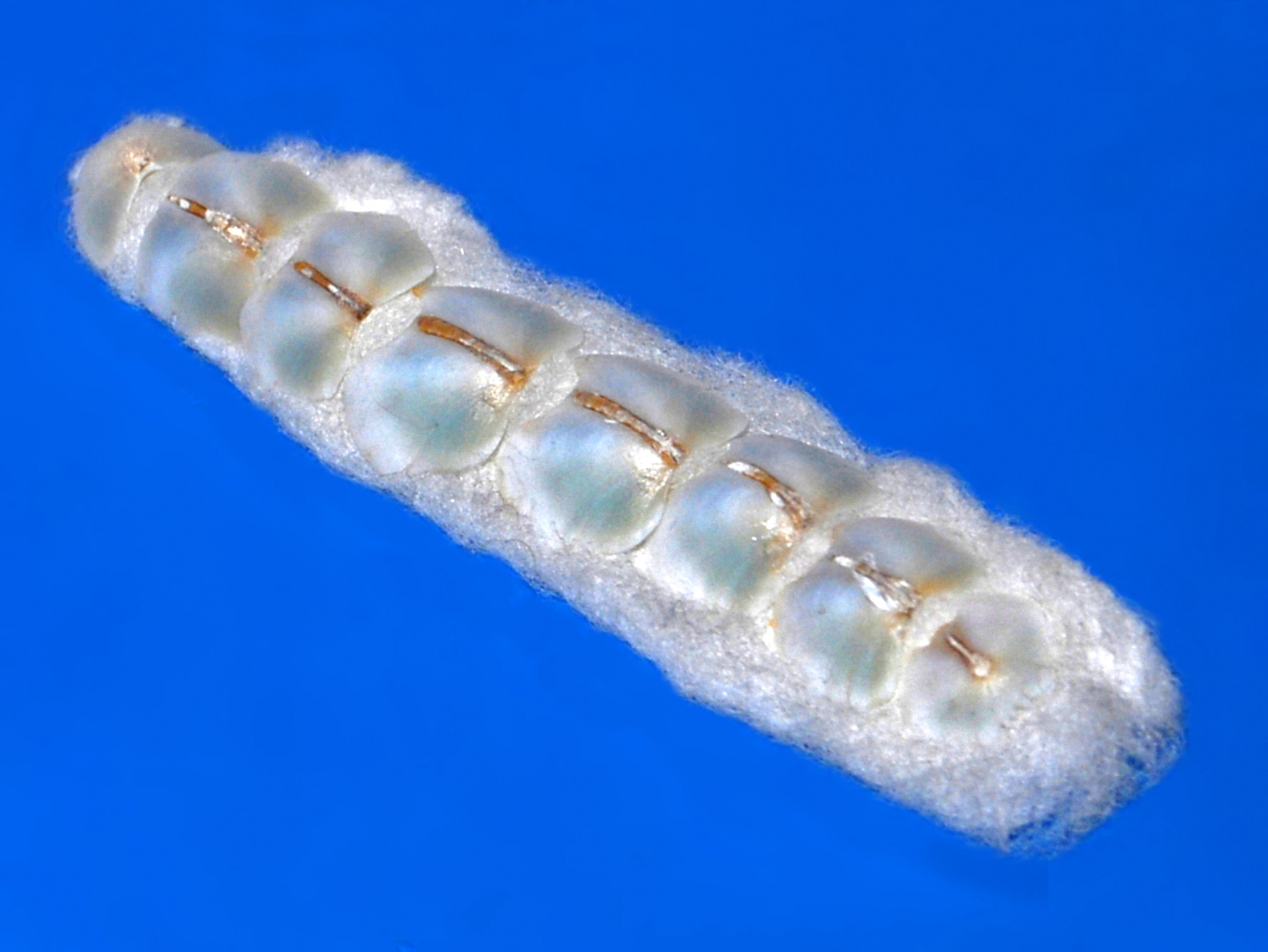
The eight interlocking plates of Cryptoconchus porosus. Museum specimen

== Description ==
Cryptoconchus porosus is a large chiton reaching a length of about 45–75 millimetres (1.8–3.0 in). The eight valves are almost completely covered by a raised girdle, young specimens may have only seven. These are pale blue or white on top, sometimes sky blue underneath, and when removed from the animal they each resemble a butterfly giving the common name. The girdle is fleshy and smooth with short sutural bristles that protrude from 18 rounded pores, which are elevated and run in two crested rows from head to tail. The colour of the dorsal surface can range from dark brown to bright orange, while the underside of the girdle is pale orange with a bright orange foot.

== Distribution and habitat ==
Cryptoconchus porosus is native to New Zealand, and present in Madagascar. These common grazers prefer outer exposed rocks washed by waves, in the low intertidal and shallow subtidal zone, or in deeper water down to 30m, often in association with sponges.

== Gallery ==
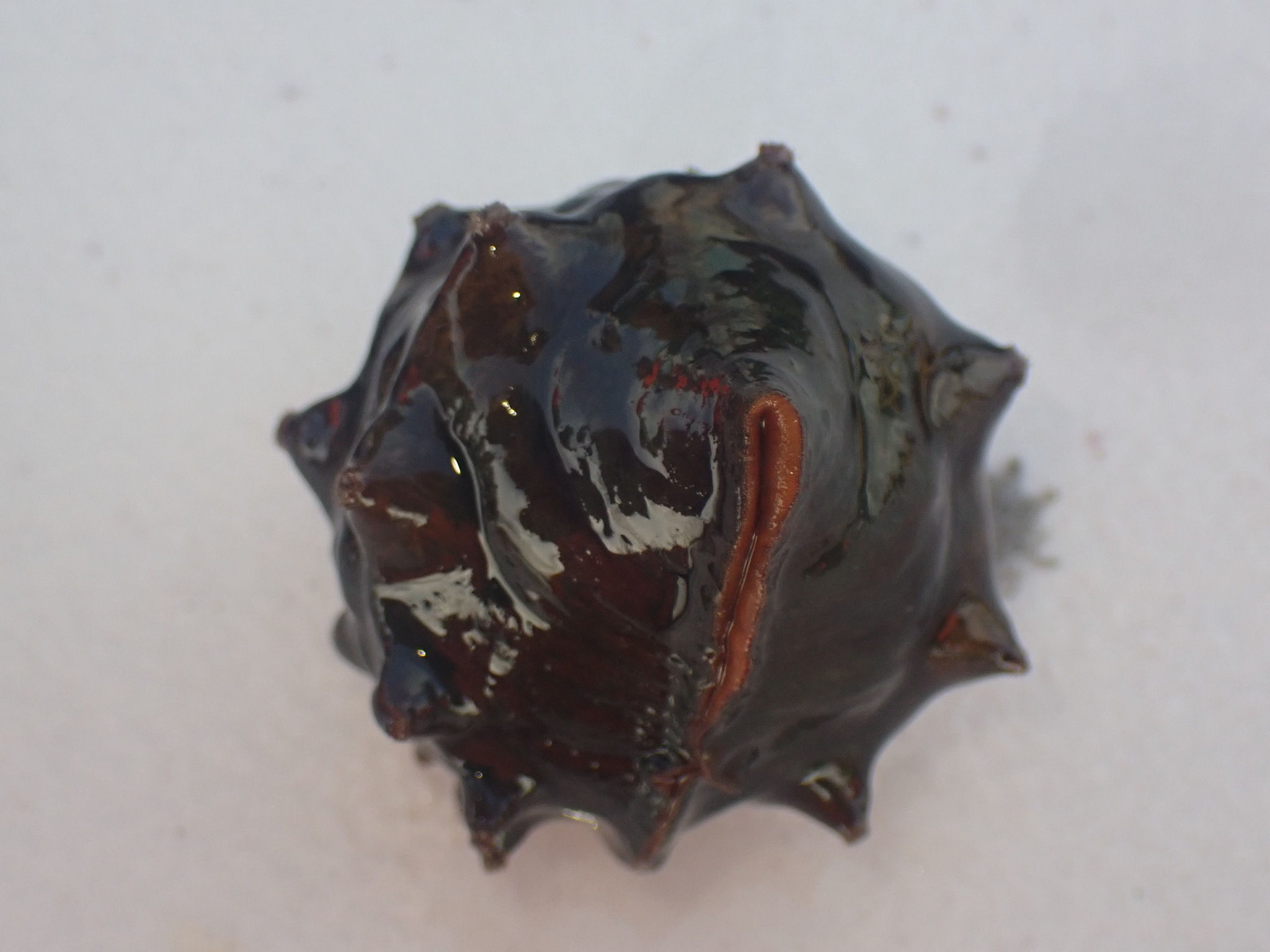

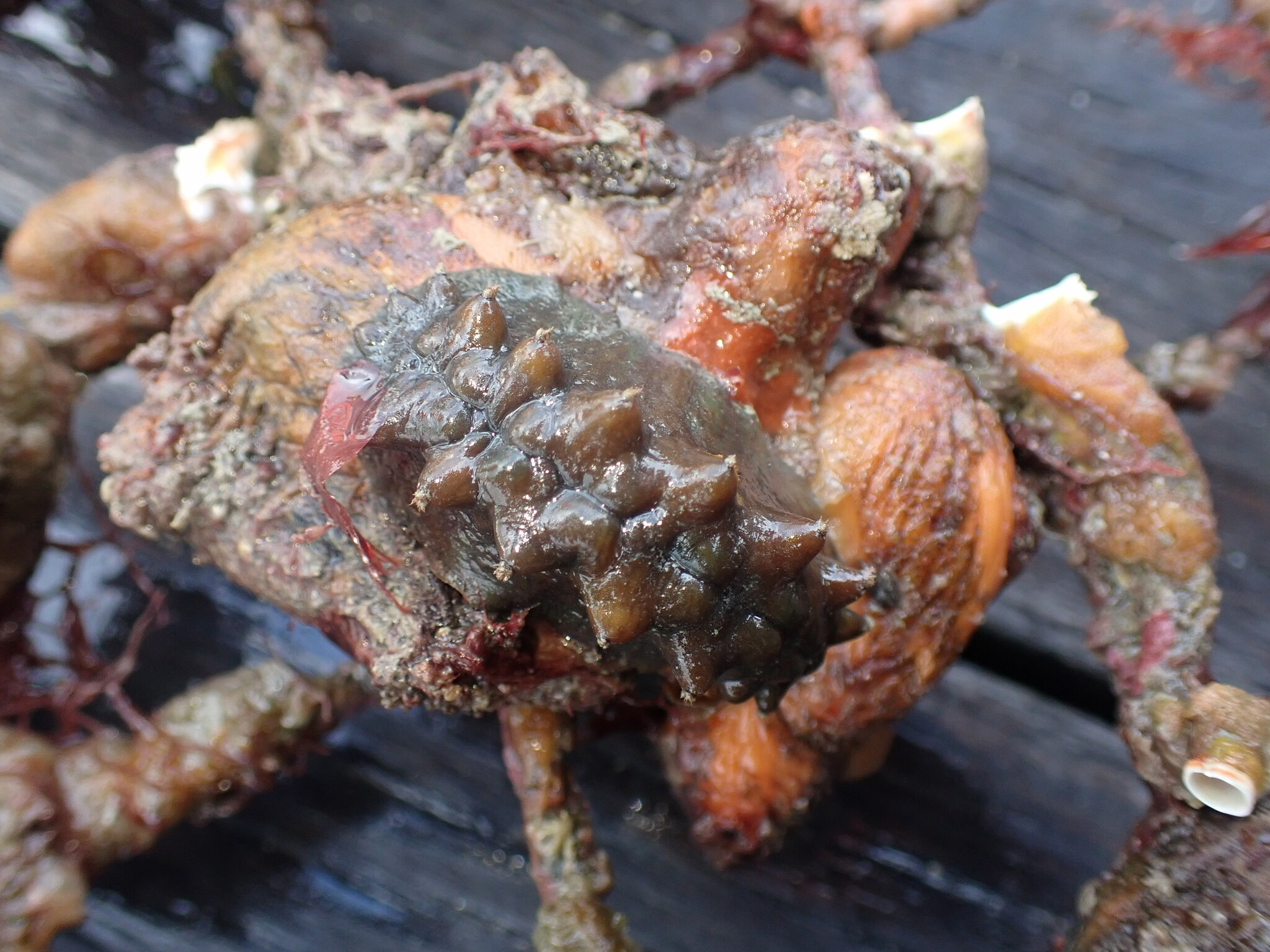

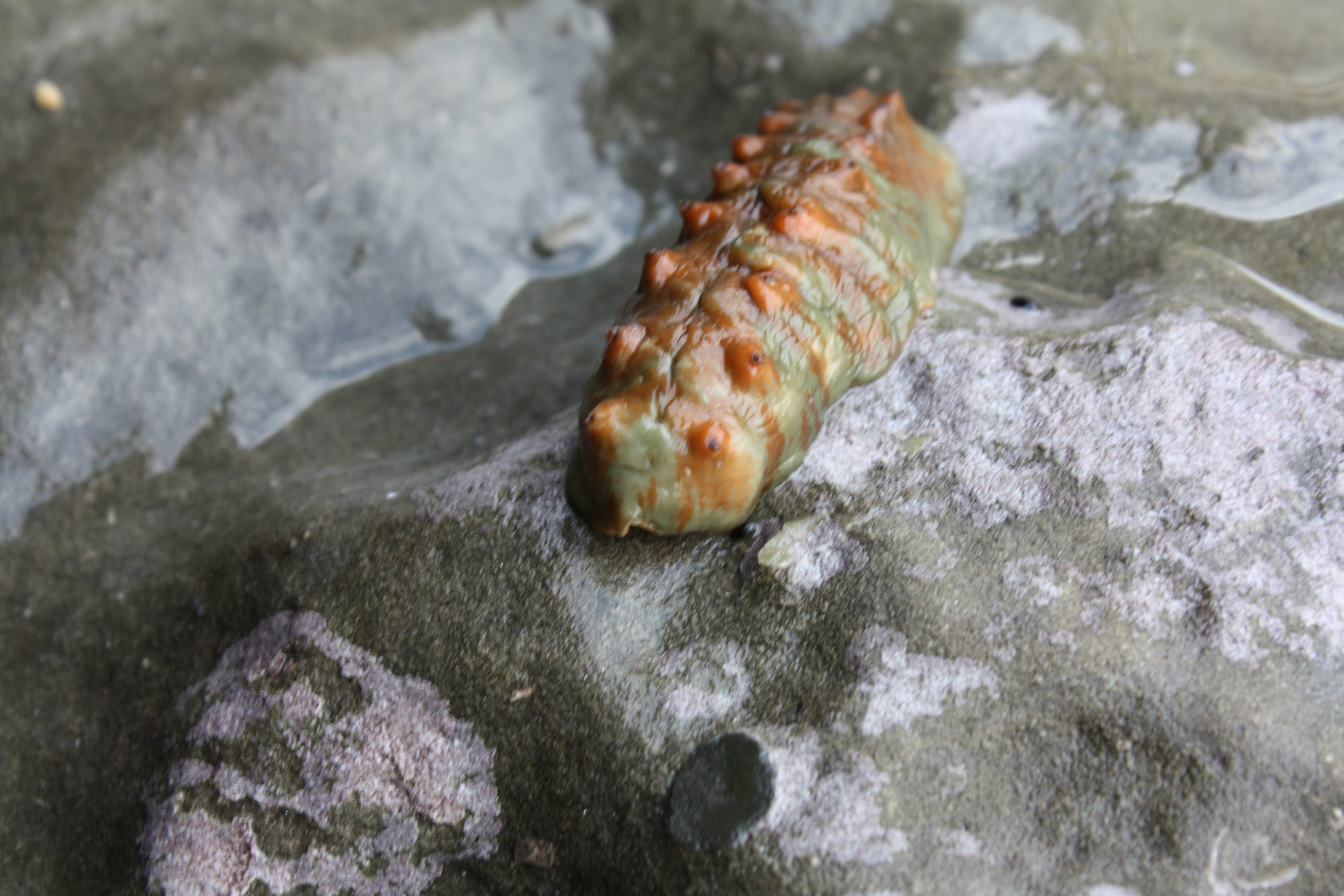

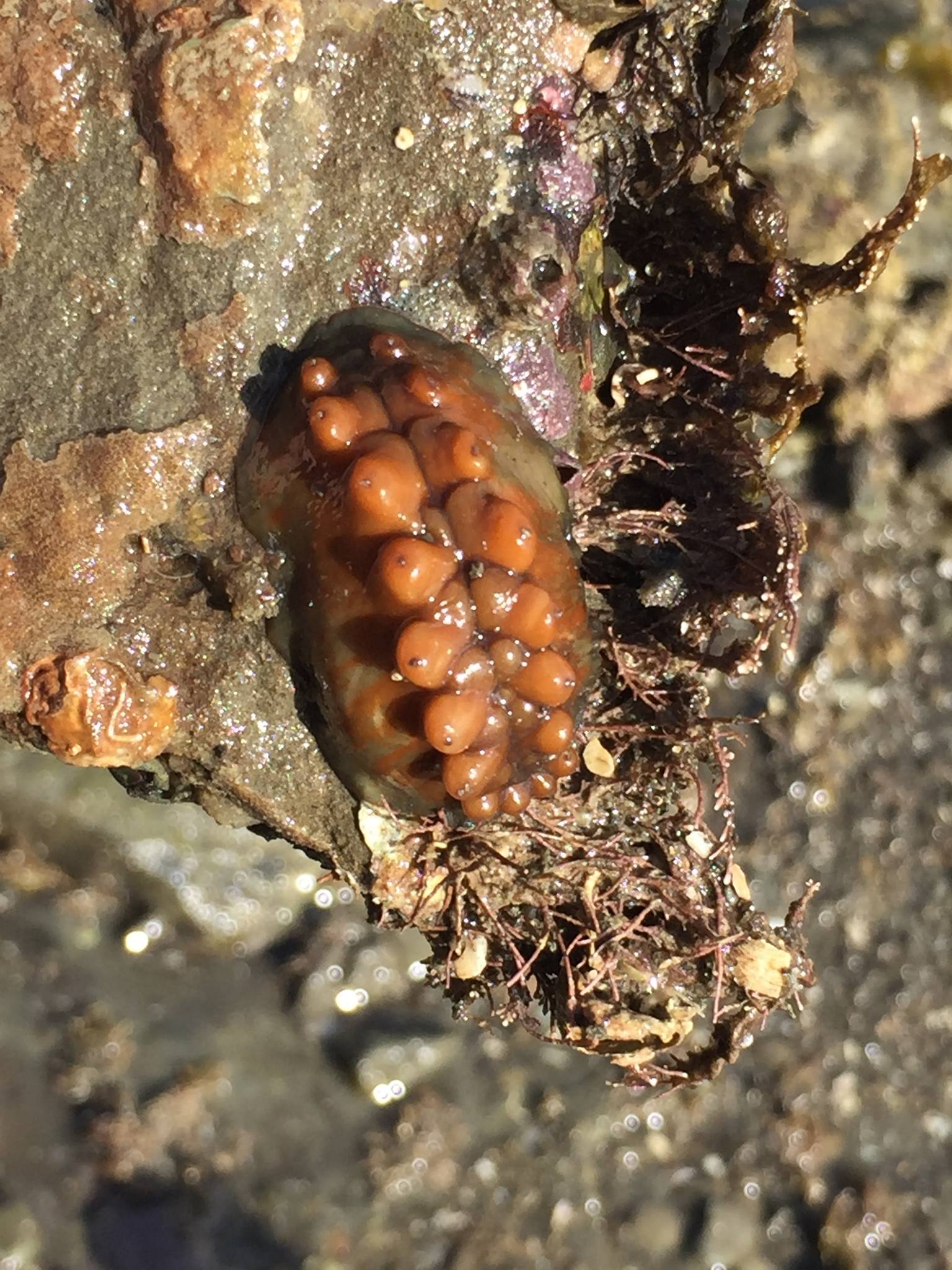
