= Prochaetodermatidae =

Scientific classification
- Domain: Eukaryota
- Kingdom: Animalia
- Phylum: Mollusca
- Class: Caudofoveata
- Order: Chaetodermatida
- Family: Prochaetodermatidae; Salvini-Plawen, 1969

Genera
- Chevroderma Scheltema, 1985; Claviderma Scheltema & Ivanov, 2000; Dacryomica Ivanov & Scheltema, 2004; Lonchoderma Salvini-Plawen, 1992; Niteomica D. Ivanov, 1996; Prochaetoderma Thiele, 1902; Spathoderma Scheltema, 1985

Family of molluscs

The Prochaetodermatidae are a family of small worm-shaped (<1 cm) chaetoderm molluscs. The burrowing organisms lack a true foot; they have a large pair of jaws and a small radula, comprising a dozen rows of paired teeth. They are known from around the globe, except in polar regions, and inhabit ocean depts of 50 m to the deepest depths trawled.
