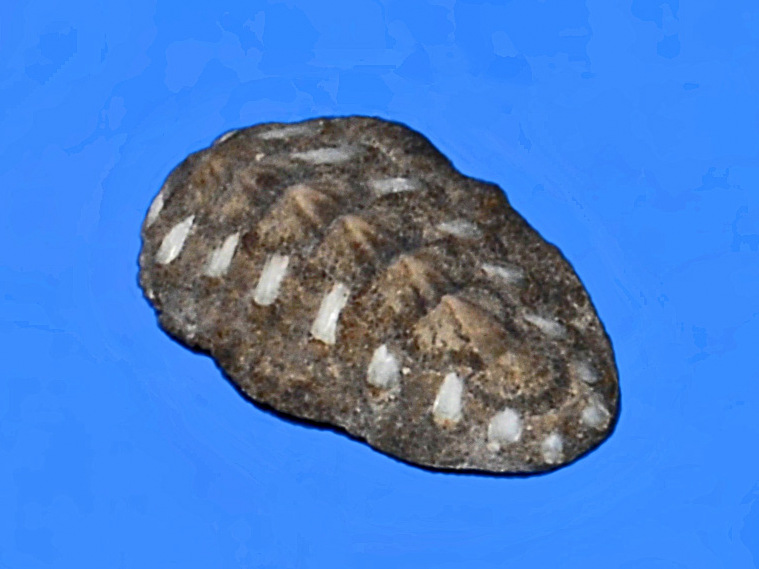
- Dorsal view of Acanthochitona bednalli from Tasmania. Museum specimen

Scientific classification
- Kingdom: Animalia
- Phylum: Mollusca
- Class: Polyplacophora
- Order: Chitonida
- Family: Acanthochitonidae
- Genus: Acanthochitona
- Species: A. bednalli

Binomial name
- Acanthochitona bednalli (Pilsbry, 1894)

Synonyms
- Subterenochiton bednalli

= Acanthochitona bednalli =

Species of mollusc

Acanthochitona bednalli, the Bednall's chiton, is a species of chiton in the family Acanthochitonidae.

== Description ==
Acanthochitona bednalli can reach a length of about 28 millimetres (1.1 in). This species has a broad girdle surrounding the valves.

== Distribution ==
This species is endemic to southeastern and southwestern Australia. These chitons live subtidally on rocks.
