= Acanthochitona pygmaea =

Acanthochitona pygmaea Temporal range: Oligocene–Present

Scientific classification
- Kingdom: Animalia
- Phylum: Mollusca
- Class: Polyplacophora
- Order: Chitonida
- Family: Acanthochitonidae
- Genus: Acanthochitona
- Species: A. pygmaea

Binomial name
- Acanthochitona pygmaea Pilsbry, 1893

Synonyms
- Acanthochites pygmaeus Pilsbry, 1893

Species of Atlantic chiton

Acanthochitona pygmaea, commonly known as the striate glass-hair chiton, is a species of chiton in the family Acanthochitonidae.

== Description ==
Acanthochitona pygmaea is a relatively small chiton that can grow to up to about 13 mm (0.5 in) long. The chiton's color is variable, being mostly white, tan, and green, but possibly also red and orange. The valves across the body are somewhat broad and beaked with a triangular shape. These valves have longitudinal lines with lateral beads. The girdle has a row of 9 silver-white or green tufts of spicules on each side of the valves. The glass-like spicules of the tufts are where the species gets its common name.

== Distribution and habitat ==
Acanthochitona pygmaea is found from North Carolina in the United States to Brazil, including throughout the Gulf of Mexico. Within this range, the chiton lives in shallow habitats, including coral reefs.
