= Craspedochiton elegans =

Scientific classification
- Domain: Eukaryota
- Kingdom: Animalia
- Phylum: Mollusca
- Class: Polyplacophora
- Order: Chitonida
- Family: Acanthochitonidae
- Genus: Craspedochiton
- Species: C. elegans

Binomial name
- Craspedochiton elegans (Iredale & Hull, 1925)

Synonyms
- Craspedoplax elegans Iredale & Hull, 1925

Species of mollusc

Craspedochiton elegans is a chiton species in the genus Craspedochiton.
