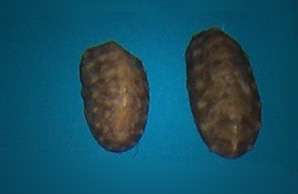

Scientific classification
- Kingdom: Animalia
- Phylum: Mollusca
- Class: Polyplacophora
- Order: Chitonida
- Family: Acanthochitonidae
- Genus: Acanthochitona
- Species: A. fascicularis

Binomial name
- Acanthochitona fascicularis (Linnaeus, 1767)

Synonyms
- Acanthochites communis Risso, 1826 (basionym); Acanthochiton fascicularis (Following genus synonymy); Acanthochitona communis (Risso, 1826) (Synonym); Chiton fascicularis Linnaeus, 1767 (basionym)

= Acanthochitona fascicularis =

Species of mollusc

Acanthochitona fascicularis, the Velvety mail shell, is a common chiton in the family Acanthochitonidae.

== Distribution and habitat ==
This chiton has been recorded in European waters, the Mediterranean Sea, the Red Sea and the Pacific Ocean. It is usually found on the lower shore and the sublittoral zone to a depth of 50 m on hard surfaces, such as on or under rocks, boulders or in rock crevices

== Description ==
The shell of Acanthochitona fascicularis has an elongate, flat oval shape and is about twice as long as broad. It has a length of up to 60 mm. The color may be variable; being marbled with off-white, gray, yellowish or brown. The eight transverse valves of the shell are strongly arched with a rounded keel and prominent beaks. The keel shows longitudinal ridges and appears coarsely granular due to densely packed, oval or rounded and evenly arranged dorsal papillae. The girdle contains 18 tufts of bristles (maximum length : 1.5 mm), one on each side at the back of the plates. Four of these bristles are arranged around the cephalic plate. The sculpture of the valves consists of a cover with densely packed, backward-pointing spines that are regularly distributed and give a velvety feel when touched. The girdle is fringed with a dense series of longer spines (up to 1 mm).

This species can be confounded with Acanthochitona crinita, but this last one is smaller (about 30 mm) and the granules on the dorsal plates are large, flat topped and pyriform and unevenly spaced.

== Feeding habits ==
This chiton is a grazer that feeds on encrusting or filamentous algae and possibly bryozoans.
