= Acanthochitona armata =

Scientific classification
- Kingdom: Animalia
- Phylum: Mollusca
- Class: Polyplacophora
- Order: Chitonida
- Suborder: Acanthochitonina
- Family: Acanthochitonidae
- Genus: Acanthochitona
- Species: A. armata

Binomial name
- Acanthochitona armata (Pease, 1872)

Synonyms
- Acanthochites armatus Pease, 1872 (original combination); Acanthochites boeticus Pilsbry, 1893 ·

Species of chiton in Hawaii

Acanthochitona armata is a chiton of the surf zone endemic to Hawaiʻi. It has the common name Bristled chiton.

== Description ==
The shell of Acanthochitona armata is typically a light green with black spots and stripes. It grows to about one inch in length. It is oval-shaped with a bilaterally symmetric body. Its girdle has shiny metallic-colored spicules. The girdle holds together valves, which are grainy at its sides. It reproduces through external fertilization.

== Distribution and habitat ==
Acanthochitona armata is endemic to Hawai'i. It subsides along the coasts, found along the surf zone, among the rocks and red algae.

== Human use and cultural significance ==
Historically, chiton species were not eaten by Hawaiians, but used in ceremonies like the mawaewae to show the presence of firstborns.
