= Lonchoderma =

Scientific classification
- Domain: Eukaryota
- Kingdom: Animalia
- Phylum: Mollusca
- Class: Caudofoveata
- Order: Chaetodermatida
- Family: Prochaetodermatidae
- Genus: Lonchoderma; Salvini-Plawen, 1992

Genus of molluscs

Lonchoderma is a genus of molluscs belonging to the family Prochaetodermatidae.

Species:

- Lonchoderma longisquamosum (Salvini-Plawen, 1986)
