= Furcillidens =

Scientific classification
- Domain: Eukaryota
- Kingdom: Animalia
- Phylum: Mollusca
- Class: Caudofoveata
- Order: Chaetodermatida
- Family: Chaetodermatidae
- Genus: Furcillidens; Scheltema, 1998

Genus of molluscs

Furcillidens is a genus of molluscs belonging to the family Chaetodermatidae.

The species of this genus are found in Western America.

Species:

- Furcillidens incrasatus (Schwabl, 1963)
