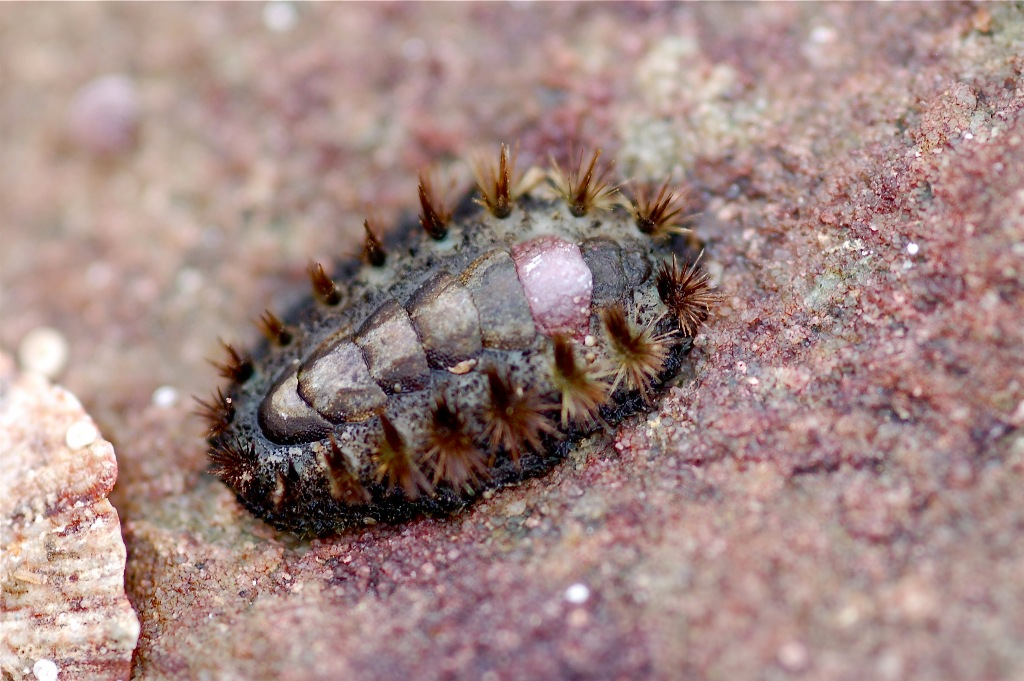

Scientific classification
- Kingdom: Animalia
- Phylum: Mollusca
- Class: Polyplacophora
- Order: Chitonida
- Family: Acanthochitonidae
- Genus: Acanthochitona
- Species: A. garnoti

Binomial name
- Acanthochitona garnoti (Blainville, 1825)

Synonyms
- Acanthochiton turtoni Ashby, 1928; Chiton garnoti Blainville, 1825

= Acanthochitona garnoti =

Species of mollusc

Acanthochitona garnoti, the spiny chiton, is a medium-sized polyplacophoran mollusc in the family Acanthochitonidae, found on the coast of southern Africa.

== Description ==
This species is conspicuous for the nine paired tufts or rosettes of long glassy spines that decorate its girdle. Between the tufts, the girdle bears many smaller spicules. The spicules are sharp, and if carelessly handled, easily penetrate the human skin, where they detach and remain, becoming painfully irritating.

The valves are of a dull brown color and marked with oblique pale stripes. They are largely concealed by the girdle. Adult size is 30–45 mm.

== Distribution and habitat ==
A. garnoti occurs along the south coast of Africa, from Cape Columbine in Namibia to the south coast of KwaZulu-Natal in South Africa. It can be found on exposed rock surfaces high up in the inter-tidal zone, a location that is unusually far from the water for chitons.

== Ecology ==
The species is mostly active at night, foraging by grazing in a small radius (10–30 cm) around its location. Both the range and the pattern of foraging are adapted to the type of substrate, with different strategies adopted on rocky versus sandy ground.
