= Scutopodidae =

Scientific classification
- Kingdom: Animalia
- Phylum: Mollusca
- Class: Caudofoveata
- Order: Limifossorida
- Family: Scutopodidae

Genus and species
- Scutopus; Scutopus robustus; Scutopus ventrolineatus

Family of molluscs

Scutopodidae is a monotypic family of molluscs in the class Aplacophora.
