= Craspedochiton zefranki =

Scientific classification
- Kingdom: Animalia
- Phylum: Mollusca
- Class: Polyplacophora
- Order: Chitonida
- Family: Acanthochitonidae
- Genus: Craspedochiton
- Species: C. zefranki

Binomial name
- Craspedochiton zefranki Vončina, 2025

Species of mollusc

Craspedochiton zefranki is a species of chiton belonging to the family Acanthochitoninae. It is native to the Solomon Islands near San Cristobal.

== Etymology ==
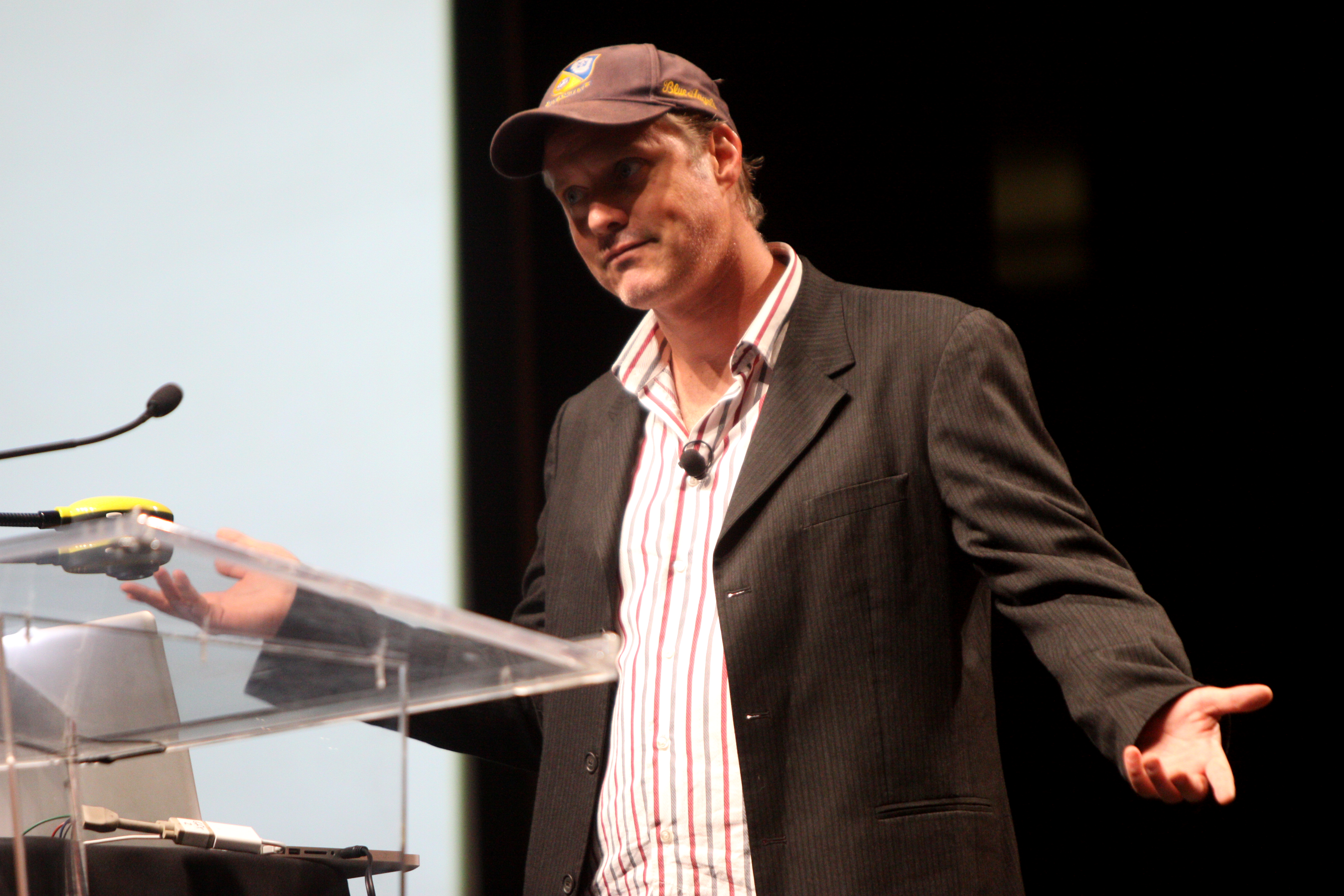
Image of the person this species was named after.

The species name "zefranki" is a masculine adjective formed from the name of Hosea Jan "Ze" Frank, who is known for his wit, creativity and humorous approach to scientific knowledge in the YouTube series TRUE FACTS.

== Description ==
It has a small size growing to a size of up to 15 millimeters. Its head is semicircular and body has an overall ovoid shape with a ridge. The coloration of its body has a mix of yellow, dark orange and white with some green.
