= Chevroderma =

Scientific classification
- Domain: Eukaryota
- Kingdom: Animalia
- Phylum: Mollusca
- Class: Caudofoveata
- Order: Chaetodermatida
- Family: Prochaetodermatidae
- Genus: Chevroderma; Scheltema, 1985

Genus of molluscs

Chevroderma is a genus of molluscs belonging to the family Prochaetodermatidae.

The species of this genus are found in Atlantic Ocean.

Species:

- Chevroderma cuspidatum Ivanov & Scheltema, 2008
- Chevroderma gauson Scheltema, 1985
- Chevroderma hadalis Ivanov, 1996
- Chevroderma javanicum Ivanov & Scheltema, 2002
- Chevroderma lusae Ivanov & Scheltema, 2002
- Chevroderma paradoxum Ivanov & Scheltema, 2001
- Chevroderma scalpellum Scheltema, 1985
- Chevroderma turnerae Scheltema, 1985
- Chevroderma vityazi Ivanov & Scheltema, 2002
- Chevroderma whitlatchi Scheltema, 1985
