= Claviderma =

Scientific classification
- Domain: Eukaryota
- Kingdom: Animalia
- Phylum: Mollusca
- Class: Caudofoveata
- Order: Chaetodermatida
- Family: Prochaetodermatidae
- Genus: Claviderma; Scheltema & Ivanov, 2000

Genus of molluscs

Claviderma is a genus of molluscs belonging to the family Prochaetodermatidae.

The species of this genus are found on the coasts of Atlantic Ocean and Australia.

Species:

- Claviderma amplum Ivanov & Scheltema, 2008
- Claviderma australe (Scheltema, 1989)
- Claviderma brevicaudatum Scheltema & Ivanov, 2000
- Claviderma compactum Ivanov & Scheltema, 2008
- Claviderma crassum Ivanov & Scheltema, 2008
- Claviderma gagei Ivanov & Scheltema, 2001
- Claviderma gladiatum (Salvini-Plawen, 1992)
- Claviderma laticarinatum Ivanov & Scheltema, 2001
- Claviderma mexicanum Ivanov & Scheltema, 2008
- Claviderma tricosum Scheltema & Ivanov, 2000
- Claviderma virium Corrêa, Miranda & Passos, 2018
