= Florida Middle Grounds =

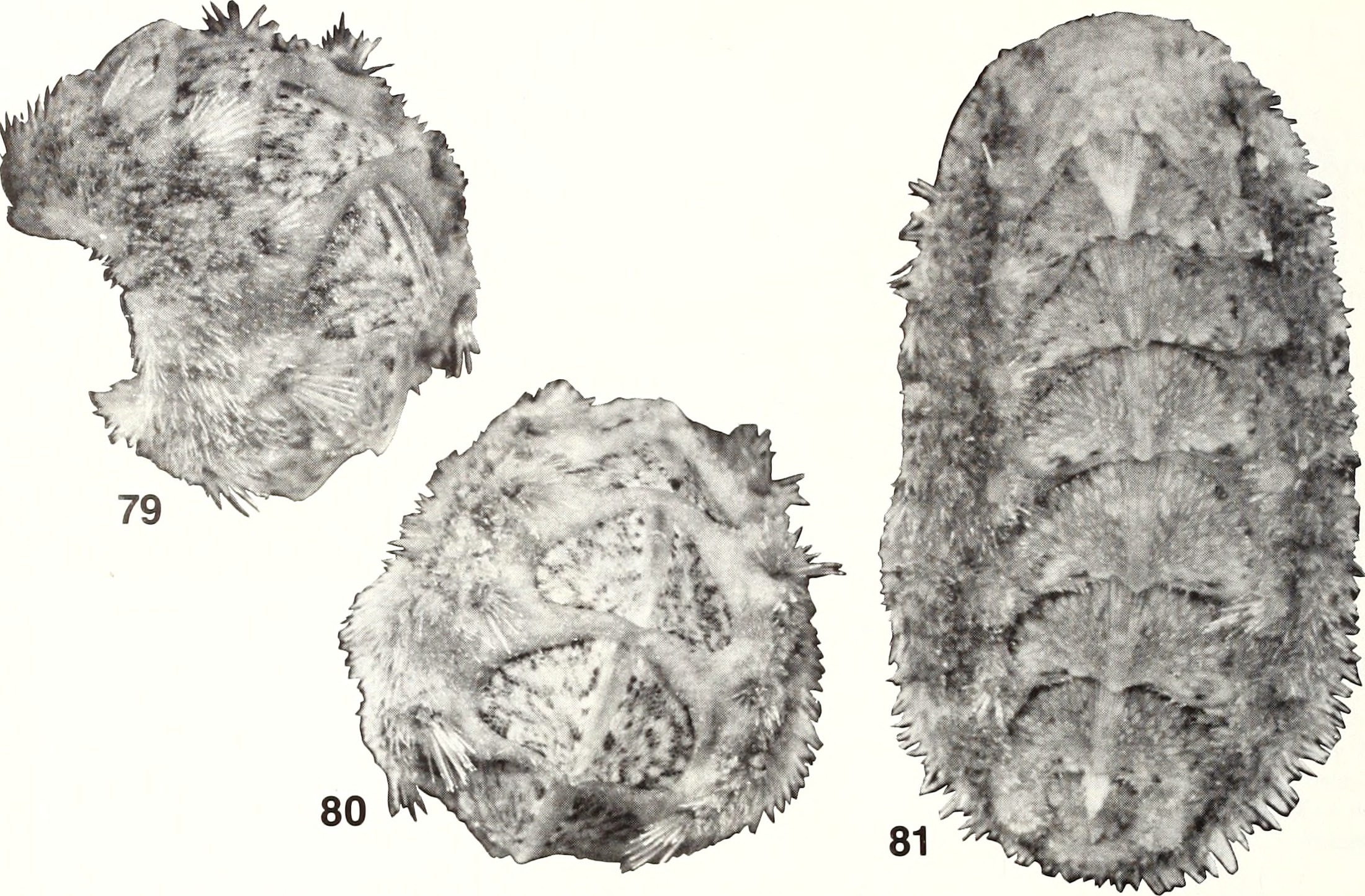
- Acanthochitona venezuelana, Florida Middle Ground, May 1977

- Location within Florida Location within the United States

Location
- Location: Gulf of Mexico
- Coordinates: 28°27′30″N 84°12′30″W
- Country: United States

Geology
- Type: reef

The Florida Middle Grounds are a reefs in the northeastern Gulf of Mexico, approximately 128 kilometres (80 miles) west northwest of the West coast of Florida.

== Geography ==
These reefs consist of a series of both high and low relief limestone ledges and pinnacles that exceed 15 metres (49 feet) in some areas. The roughly 348 NM² of this hardbottom region lies 150 kilometres (93 miles) south of the panhandle coast and 160 kilometres (99 miles) northwest of Tampa Bay between 28° 10' and 28° 45' N and 084°00' and 084°25' W

== Geology ==
The ridges consist of unconsolidated marine calcareous muddy sand, about 12 meters (40 feet) thick, overlying a weathered, fossiliferous limestone of Miocene age (between 5 and 22 million years old) and capped by a carbonate rock composed primarily of the sessile vermetid gastropod Petaloconchus sp. (a marine snail that cements its tubular shell to a hard surface, such as a rock or another shell). Previous to core sample studies in 2010 and 2011, the Florida Middle grounds were thought to have been formed by coral. However, new research indicates that the ridges likely formed as a series of shore-parallel sediment bars eventually capped and preserved by vermetid gastropods, or "worm snails."

== Flora and fauna ==
Today's middle ground reef ecosystem represents the northernmost scope of mid-shelf octocoral communities in North America. It is a prehistoric coral-reef complex that has bio-similarities to modern patch-reefs, and a species distribution that includes both Carolinian and Caribbean components. The fish species are markedly tropical, with stony coral, gorgonians, and sponge dominating the community that relies upon the existence of the Loop Current. Currently, there are 170 species of fish, 103 species of algae, approximately 40 sponges, 75 mollusks, 56 decapod crustaceans, 41 polychaetes, 23 echinoderms and 23 species of stony corals.

== Research ==
In 2000, a research project was funded by the National Oceanic and Atmospheric Administration to evaluate the status of the reef. This research was conducted utilizing the DeepWorker 2000 one person submersible.

== Recreation ==
The "Middle grounds shipwreck" is a popular scuba diving and fishing location. In 2004, the wreck was identified by a team of divers led by Michael C. Barnette as the tugboat Gwalia.
