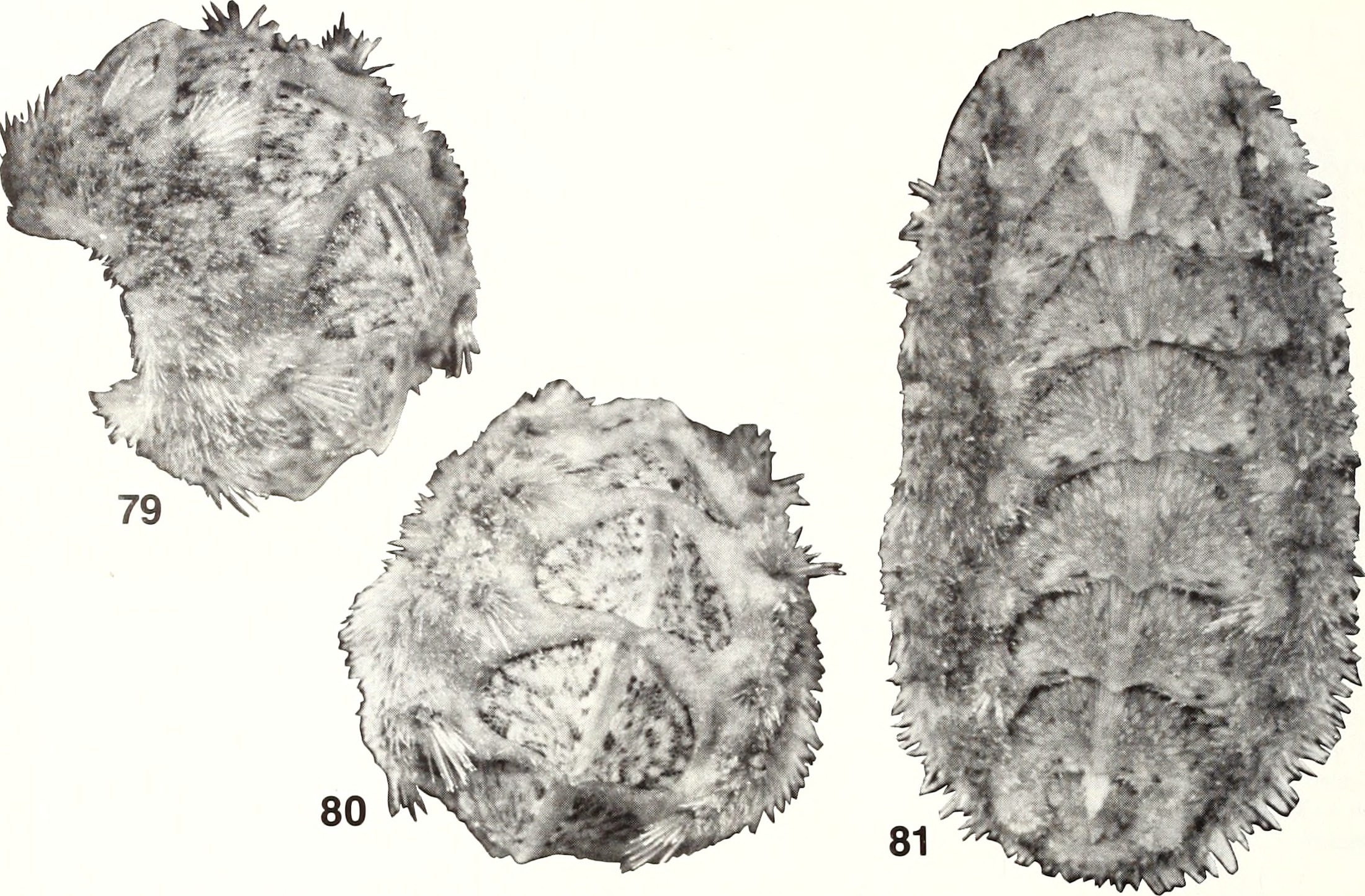
- Acanthochitona venezuelana, Florida Middle Grounds, 28°35.0'N, 84°14.9'W, 31 m, 19 May 1977.

Scientific classification
- Kingdom: Animalia
- Phylum: Mollusca
- Class: Polyplacophora
- Order: Chitonida
- Family: Acanthochitonidae
- Genus: Acanthochitona; Gray, 1821

Synonyms
- Acanthochaetes Risso, 1826 (synonym and incorrect subsequent spelling of Acanthochites Risso, 1826); Acanthochites Risso, 1826; Acanthochites (Meturoplax) Pilsbry, 1894; Acanthochiton Herrmannsen, 1846 (invalid: unjustified emendation of Acanthochites Risso, 1826); Acanthochiton (Acanthochites) Risso, 1826; Anisochiton P. Fischer, 1885; Chiton (Acanthochaetes) [sic] (misspelling); Chiton (Acanthochites) Risso, 1826; Chiton (Acanthochiton) Herrmannsen, 1846; Chiton (Hamachiton) Middendorff, 1847 (a junior synonym); Chiton (Platysemus) Middendorff, 1847; Meturoplax Pilsbry, 1894

= Acanthochitona =

Acanthochitona Temporal range: Oligocene–Recent

Genus of molluscs

Acanthochitona is a genus of chitons in the family Acanthochitonidae, of worldwide distribution.

== Species ==
According to the World Register of Marine Species (WoRMS), species in the genus Acanthochitona include

- Acanthochitona achates (Gould, 1859)
- Acanthochitona andersoni Watters, 1981
- Acanthochitona angelica W. H. Dall, 1919
- Acanthochitona approximans (Hedley & Hull, 1912)
- Acanthochitona armata (Pease, 1872)
- Acanthochitona arragonites (Carpenter, 1857)
- Acanthochitona astrigera (Reeve, 1847)
- Acanthochitona avicula (Carpenter, 1857)
- Acanthochitona balesae Pilsbry MS, Abbott, 1954 – slender glass-hair chiton
- Acanthochitona bednalli (Pilsbry, 1894)
- Acanthochitona biformis (Nierstrasz, 1905)
- Acanthochitona bisulcata (Pilsbry, 1893)
- Acanthochitona bouvieri (de Rochebrune, 1881)
- Acanthochitona brookesi Ashby, 1926
- Acanthochitona brunoi Righi, 1971
- Acanthochitona burghardtae Clark, 2000
- Acanthochitona byungdoni Hong, Dell'Angelo & Van Belle, 1990
- Acanthochitona circellata (A. Adams & Reeve MS, Reeve, 1847)
- Acanthochitona ciroi Righi, 1971
- Acanthochitona complanata Hull, 1924
- Acanthochitona coxi (Pilsbry, 1894)
- Acanthochitona crinita (Pennant, 1777)
  - Acanthochitona crinita crinita (Pennant, 1777)
  - Acanthochitona crinita oblonga Leloup, 1981
- Acanthochitona defilippii (Tapparone Canefri, 1874)
- Acanthochitona discrepans (Brown, 1827)
- Acanthochitona dissimilis Is. & Iw. Taki, 1931
- Acanthochitona exquisita (Pilsbry, 1893)
- Acanthochitona fascicularis (Linnaeus, 1767)
- Acanthochitona feroxa Kim & Hwang, 2026
- Acanthochitona ferreirai Lyons, 1988
- Acanthochitona garnoti (de Blainville, 1825)
- Acanthochitona gatliffi Ashby, 1919
- Acanthochitona granostriata (Pilsbry, 1894)
- Acanthochitona hemphilli (Pilsbry, 1893) – red glass-hair chiton
- Acanthochitona hirudiniformis
  - Acanthochitona hirudiniformis hirudiniformis (Sowerby in Broderip & Sowerby, 1832)
  - Acanthochitona hirudiniformis peruviana Leloup, 1941
- Acanthochitona imperatrix Watters, 1981
- Acanthochitona intermedia(Nierstrasz, 1905)
- Acanthochitona joallesi (de Rochebrune, 1881)
- Acanthochitona jucunda (de Rochebrune, 1882)
- Acanthochitona jugotenuis Kaas, 1979
- Acanthochitona kimberi (Torr, 1912)
- Acanthochitona leopoldi (Leloup, 1933)
- Acanthochitona limbata Kaas, 1986
- Acanthochitona lineata Lyons, 1988
- Acanthochitona macrocystialis Ashby, 1924
- Acanthochitona mahensis Winckworth, 1927
- Acanthochitona mastalleri Leloup MS, Strack, 1989
- Acanthochitona minuta Leloup, 1980
- Acanthochitona noumeaensis Leloup, 1941
- Acanthochitona pelicanensis Mackay, 1929
- Acanthochitona penetrans Winckworth, 1933
- Acanthochitona penicillata (Deshayes, 1863)
- Acanthochitona pilsbryi (Sykes, 1896)
- Acanthochitona pygmaea (Pilsbry, 1893) – striate glass-hair chiton
- Acanthochitona quincunx Leloup, 1981
- Acanthochitona retrojecta (Pilsbry, 1894)
- Acanthochitona rhodea (Pilsbry, 1893)
- Acanthochitona roseojugum Lyons, 1988
- Acanthochitona rubrolineata (Lischke, 1873)
- Acanthochitona saundersi Gowlett & Zeidler, 1987
- Acanthochitona scutigera (A. Adams & Reeve MS, Reeve, 1847)
- Acanthochitona shaskyi Ferreira, 1987
- Acanthochitona shirleyi Ashby, 1922
- Acanthochitona sibogae (Thiele, 1909)
- Acanthochitona subrubicunda Leloup, 1941
- Acanthochitona sueurii (de Blainville, 1825)
- Acanthochitona terezae Guerra Júnior, 1983
- Acanthochitona thackwayi Ashby, 1924
- Acanthochitona thileniusi Lyons, 1988
- Acanthochitona variegata (Nierstrasz, 1906)
- Acanthochitona venezuelana Lyons, 1988
- Acanthochitona viridis (Pease, 1872)
- Acanthochitona woodwardi Kaas & Van Belle, 1988
- Acanthochitona worsfoldi Lyons, 1988
- Acanthochitona zebra Lyons, 1988
- Acanthochitona zelandica (Quoy and Gaimard, 1835)
