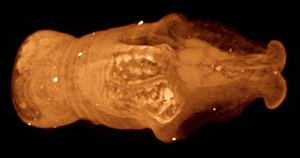
- Falcidens sp. stained with osmium tetroxide and embedded in Spurr's resin for electron microscopy, scanned in resin block. Volume rendering of a low-resolution scan, showing the anterior-most 1.4 mm of the animal.

Scientific classification
- Domain: Eukaryota
- Kingdom: Animalia
- Phylum: Mollusca
- Class: Caudofoveata
- Order: Chaetodermatida
- Family: Chaetodermatidae
- Genus: Falcidens; Salvini-Plawen, 1968

= Falcidens =

Genus of molluscs

Falcidens is one of three genera within the family Chaetodermatida; its radula consists of a single row of teeth which are mineralized in crystalline hydroxyapatite (a most unusual mineral in organisms), and its teeth are not periodically shed and replaced like in other molluscs. For details of the radula, see Radula#In caudofoveates.

It contains the following species:

- Falcidens acutargatus Salvini-Plawen, 1992
- Falcidens aequabilis Salvini-Plawen, 1972
- Falcidens caudatus Heath, 1918)
- Falcidens chiastos Scheltema, 1989
- Falcidens crossotus Salvini-Plawen, 1968
- Falcidens gutturosus Kowalewsky, 1901)
- Falcidens halanychi Schander, Scheltema & Ivanov, 2006
- Falcidens hartmanae Schwabl, 1961)
- Falcidens hoffmanni Stork, 1939)
- Falcidens indicus Stork, 1941)
- Falcidens ingolfensis Salvini-Plawen, 1971
- Falcidens limifossorides Salvini-Plawen, 1986
- Falcidens liosqueameus Salvini-Plawen, 1969
- Falcidens lipuros Scheltema, 1989
- Falcidens longus Scheltema, 1998
- Falcidens loveni Nierstrasz, 1902)
- Falcidens macracanthos Scheltema, 1998
- Falcidens macrafrondis Scheltema, 1989
- Falcidens nontargatus Salvini-Plawen, 1992
- Falcidens normanni Nierstrasz, 1903)
- Falcidens poias Scheltema, 1995
- Falcidens profundus Salvini-Plawen, 1968
- Falcidens sagittiferus Salvini-Plawen, 1968
- Falcidens sterreri Salvini-Plawen, 1967)
- Falcidens strigisquamatus Salvini-Plawen, 1977)
- Falcidens targatus Salvini-Plawen, 1986
- Falcidens targotegulatus Salvini-Plawen, 1992
- Falcidens thorensis Salvini-Plawen, 1971
- Falcidens vasconiensis Salvini-Plawen, 1996
- Falcidens wireni Nierstrasz, 1902)
