= Americhiton =

Scientific classification
- Domain: Eukaryota
- Kingdom: Animalia
- Phylum: Mollusca
- Class: Polyplacophora
- Order: Chitonida
- Family: Acanthochitonidae
- Genus: Americhiton; Watters, 1990

Type species
- Acanthochites arragonites P. P. Carpenter, 1857

Genus of molluscs

Americhiton is a genus of chitons within the family Acanthochitonidae. Members of this genus are found distributed in the Caribbean Sea and in the Pacific off coasts of Mexico.

== Species ==
- Americhiton andersoni (Watters, 1981)
- Americhiton arragonites (P. P. Carpenter, 1857)
- Americhiton balesae (Abbott, 1954)
- Americhiton zebra (Lyons, 1988)
