= Craspedoplax =

Scientific classification
- Kingdom: Animalia
- Phylum: Mollusca
- Class: Polyplacophora
- Order: Chitonida
- Family: Acanthochitonidae
- Genus: Craspedoplax; Iredale & Hull, 1925

Species
- Craspedoplax variabilis (H. Adams & Angas, 1864)

Genus of molluscs

Craspedoplax is a genus of chitons in the family Acanthochitonidae.

Names brought to synonymy

- Craspedoplax elegans Iredale & Hull, 1925, a synonym for Craspedochiton elegans (Iredale & Hull, 1925)
