= Craspedochiton =

Craspedochiton Temporal range: Miocene–Recent

Scientific classification
- Kingdom: Animalia
- Phylum: Mollusca
- Class: Polyplacophora
- Order: Chitonida
- Family: Acanthochitonidae
- Genus: Craspedochiton; Shuttleworth, 1853

Species
- See text

Genus of molluscs

Craspedochiton is a genus of chitons in the family Acanthochitonidae, endemic to New Zealand, the Philippines and Australia.

== Species ==
- Craspedochiton aberrans (Odhner, 1919)
- Craspedochiton cornutus (Torr & Ashby, 1898)
- Craspedochiton elegans (Iredale)
- Craspedochiton foresti (Leloup, 1965)
- Craspedochiton hystricosus Kaas, 1991
- Craspedochiton isipingoensis (Sykes, 1901)
- Craspedochiton laqueatus (Sowerby, 1841)
- Craspedochiton liberiensis Thiele, 1909
- Craspedochiton petasa (Reeve, 1847)
- Craspedochiton producta (Carpenter in Pilsbry, 1892)
- Craspedochiton pyramidalis (Is. Taki, 1938)
- Craspedochiton tesselatus Nierstrasz, 1905
- Craspedochiton zefranki Vončina, 2025

Synonyms:

- Craspedochiton hemphilli (Pilsbry, 1893): Synonym of Acanthochitona hemphilli (Pilsbry, 1893)
- Craspedochiton rubiginosus (Hutton, 1872): Synonym of Notoplax rubiginosa (Hutton, 1872)
- Craspedochiton tetricus (Carpenter in Dall, 1882): Synonym of Craspedochiton laqueatus (Sowerby, 1841)
- Craspedochiton variabilis (H. Adams & Angas, 1864): Synonym of Craspedoplax variabilis (H. Adams & Angas, 1864)
