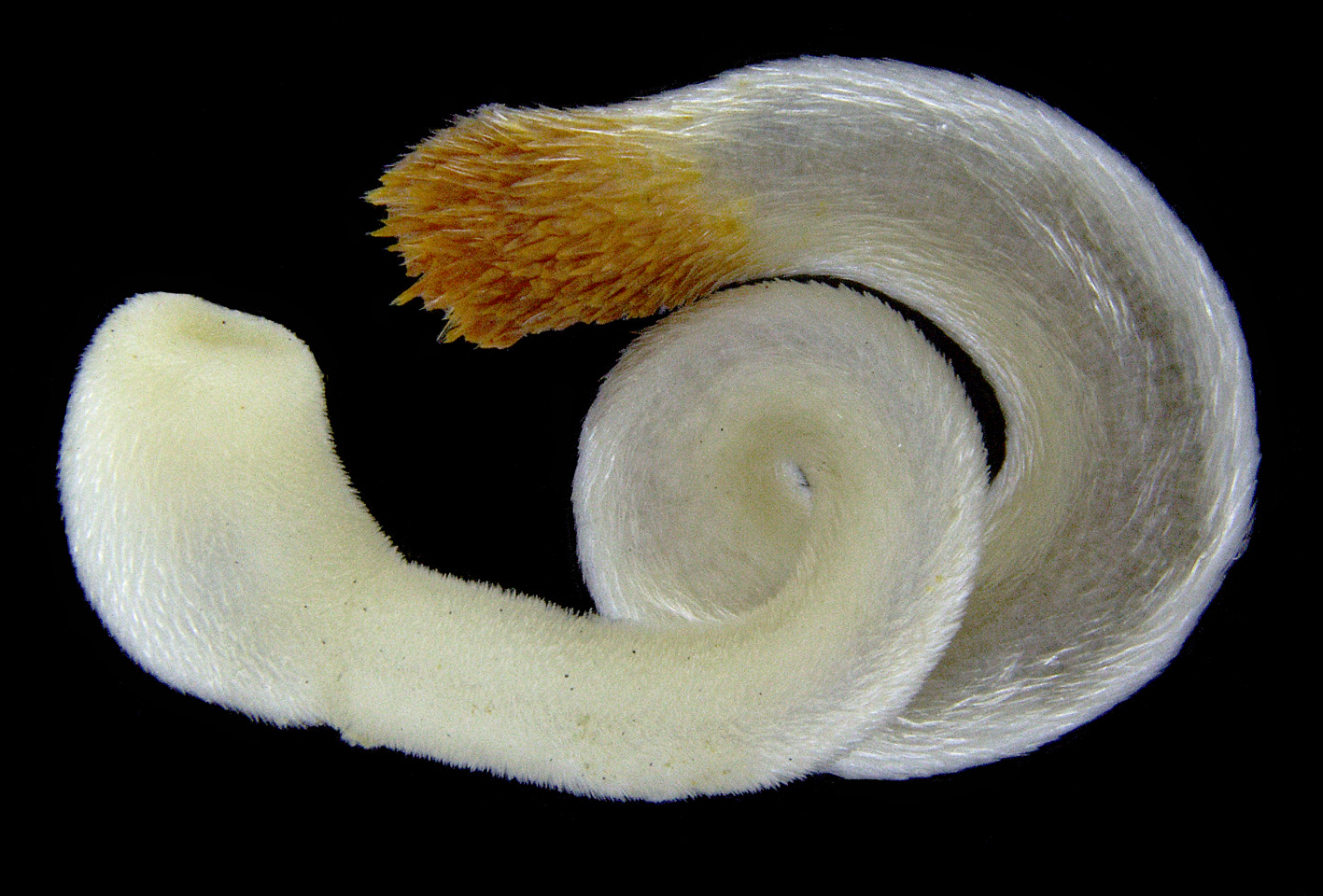
- Chaetoderma nitidulum

Scientific classification
- Domain: Eukaryota
- Kingdom: Animalia
- Phylum: Mollusca
- Class: Caudofoveata
- Order: Chaetodermatida
- Family: Chaetodermatidae
- Genus: Chaetoderma; Loven, 1844

Synonyms
- Caudofoveatus Ivanov, 1981; Crystallophrisson Mobius, 1874

= Chaetoderma (mollusc) =

Genus of molluscs

Chaetoderma is a speciose genus of aplacophoran mollusc. It has forty described species at present.

== Species ==
- Chaetoderma abidjanense Scheltema, 1976
- Chaetoderma afanasjevi
- Chaetoderma akkesiense
- Chaetoderma araucanae
- Chaetoderma argentum
- Chaetoderma bacillum
- Chaetoderma californicum
- Chaetoderma canadense
- Chaetoderma christikovi
- Chaetoderma elegans Scheltema, 1976 Gistle worm
- Chaetoderma eruditum
- Chaetoderma glaciale
- Chaetoderma hancocki
- Chaetoderma hawaiiense
- Chaetoderma indicum
- Chaetoderma intermedium
- Chaetoderma japonicum
- Chaetoderma kafanovi
- Chaetoderma lucidum
- Chaetoderma luitfriedi
- Chaetoderma majusculum Scheltema, 1976
- Chaetoderma marinae
- Chaetoderma marinelli
- Chaetoderma marioni
- Chaetoderma marisjaponicum Saito & Salvini-Plawen, 2014
- Chaetoderma militare
- Chaetoderma nanulum
- Chaetoderma nitens
- Chaetoderma nitidulum
- Chaetoderma odhneri
- Chaetoderma orientale
- Chaetoderma pacificum
- Chaetoderma pellucidum
- Chaetoderma productum
- Chaetoderma recisum
- Chaetoderma robustum
- Chaetoderma salviniplaweni
- Chaetoderma scabrum
- Chaetoderma scheltemae
- Chaetoderma sibogae
- Chaetoderma simplex
- Chaetoderma squamosum
- Chaetoderma tetradens
- Chaetoderma usitatum Scheltema, 1976
- Chaetoderma vadorum 1918
