= Leptoplax =

Scientific classification
- Domain: Eukaryota
- Kingdom: Animalia
- Phylum: Mollusca
- Class: Polyplacophora
- Order: Chitonida
- Family: Acanthochitonidae
- Genus: Leptoplax; Dall, 1882

Genus of molluscs

Leptoplax is a genus of chitons belonging to the family Acanthochitonidae.

The species of this genus are found in Southeastern Asia and Australia.

Species:

- Leptoplax coarctata (Sowerby II, 1841)
- Leptoplax curvisetosa (Leloup, 1960)
- Leptoplax doederleini (Thiele, 1909)
- Leptoplax duongae Sirenko, 2024
- Leptoplax nhatrangi Sirenko & Saito, 2017
- Leptoplax richardi (Kaas, 1990)
- Leptoplax rubromaculata (Nierstrasz, 1905)
- Leptoplax tongkingi Sirenko & Saito, 2017
- Leptoplax unica (Nierstrasz, 1905)
- Leptoplax varia Nierstrasz, 1905
- Leptoplax verconis (Torr & Ashby, 1898)
- Leptoplax wilsoni (Sykes, 1896)
