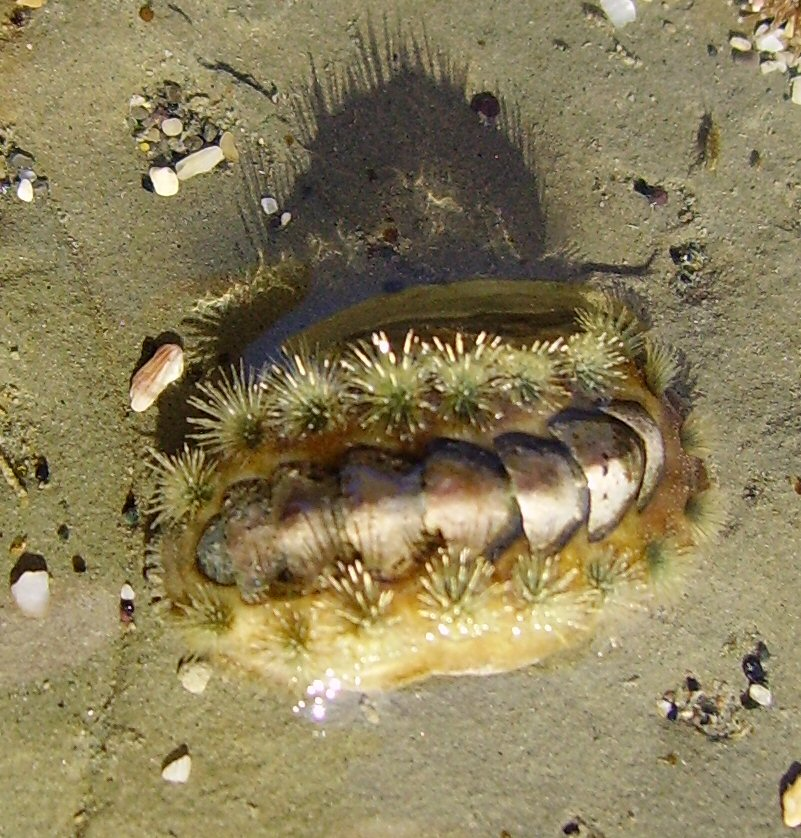

Scientific classification
- Kingdom: Animalia
- Phylum: Mollusca
- Class: Polyplacophora
- Order: Chitonida
- Family: Acanthochitonidae
- Genus: Acanthochitona
- Species: A. zelandica

Binomial name
- Acanthochitona zelandica (Quoy & Gaimard, 1835)

Synonyms
- Chiton zelandicus Quoy & Gaimard, 1835; Acanthochoetes hookeri Gray, 1843; Acanthochiton zealandicus doubtessensis Ashby, 1926; Acanthochiton brookesi Ashby, 1926; Acanthochiton zelandicus amplificatus Iredale & Hull, 1930

= Acanthochitona zelandica =

Species of mollusc

Acanthochitona zelandica is a species of chiton in the family Acanthochitonidae, also sometimes known as the hairy, or "tufted", chiton. It probably developed during the mid to late Pleistocene, and is endemic to New Zealand.

== Description ==
Acanthochitona zelandica has an oval shaped body, growing up to 30.1 mm in length and 20 mm in width. The individual median valves of the shell, excluding the head and tail, are small, usually no more than 5 mm wide and 4 mm long. The shell and girdle are generally light brown, with darker brown spots across the shell. The girdle is adorned with small bunches of spines for protection, leading to the pseudonyms "hairy" or "tufted" chiton.

== Distribution ==
Acanthochitona zelandica is found off the coast of New Zealand around the North, South, Stewart, and Auckland Islands, including the Otago Peninsula and the great Bay of Islands. It is less common off the more exposed, west coast beaches. It occupies the intertidal and shallow sub-tidal areas, in depths of up to 10 meters. A. zelandica lives primarily on, underneath, and in the crevices of coastal rocks. It has been observed living in clumps of the Pacific oyster Magallana gigas, most likely to avoid being smothered by increasing mud levels.

== Anatomy ==
Chitons have a relatively simple body structure, with a straight-line arrangement of the visceral organs. It moves on its one large foot, and its symmetrical body is surrounded by a girdle of muscular tissue and protected by partially embedded dorsal shell plates. The girdle on Acanthochitona zelandica is adorned with patches of spines. Unlike other mollusks, the plates consist of eight articulating aragonite valves, which allow for chitons to cling to irregular surfaces and roll into balls when dislodged or endangered. Chiton valve structure is composed of three layers. The first layer is the outer periostracum, which is a thin, organic membrane. The second layer is known as the tegmentum, which is composed of organic material as well as pigmented calcium carbonate. The third and bottommost layer is the calcareous layer, or articulamentum, which is a thick, pearly layer. Acanthochitona zelandica, along with other species of chiton such as Notoplax violacea, have some of the simplest valve structure of all known chitons. The dorsal layer, or tegmentum, is composed of one spherulitic sublayer, one crossed lamellar sublayer, and a ventral acicular sublayer. A. zelandica is the only currently known chiton that utilizes two different crossed lamellar structures.

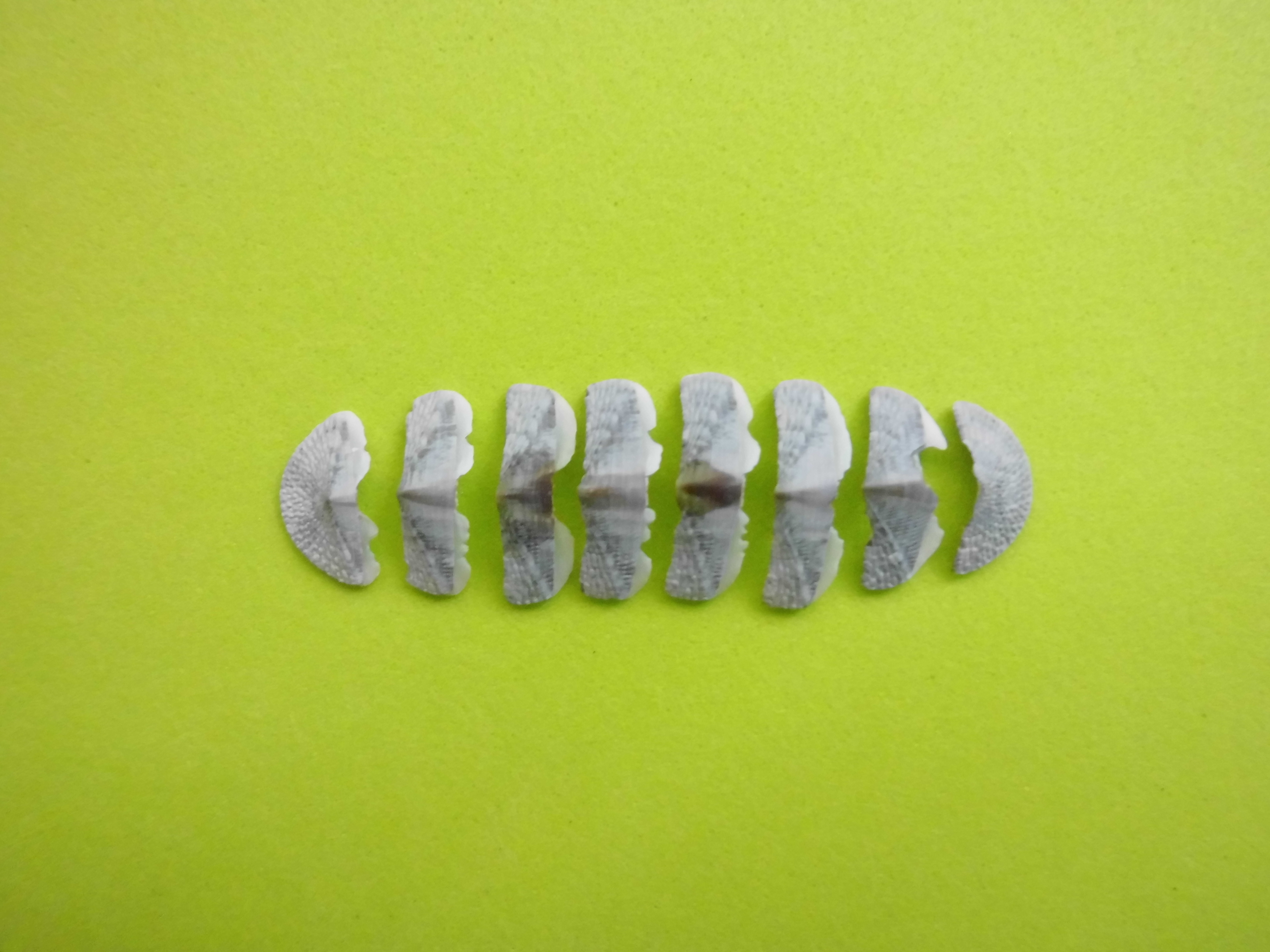
Photo of the eight individual chiton dorsal valves, which overlap but allow flexibility for locomotion. Anterior to the left.

As mollusks, Acanthochitona zelandica have an internal mantle, or pallial cavity. In chitons, gills are suspended from the mantle on either side of the foot and interact with an open circulatory system. The nerve system most resembles a round nerve net. Chiton body fluid is isosmotic with sea water, implying no osmotic regulation. Like other chitons, A. zelandica has no eyes, instead relying on simple sensory structures in the girdle and photosensory organs known as aesthetes in the shell. Inside the shell, the tegmentum layer is permeated by vertical canals, which allow light to reach sensory megalopores and micropores.

The Acanthochitona zelandica mouth is similar to that of other mollusks. It is associated with two salivary glands and uses a thin strap with rows of teeth, known as the radula, to graze and bottom-feed. As the organism wears through the front rows of the teeth, they are discarded or swallowed, then replaced by new rows that move forward. Unique to chitons, one pair of cusps in each row is coated with magnetite, reinforcing the teeth to be stronger than stainless steel. They are the only mollusks that have magnetite-coated teeth, and the only organisms known to produce such large amounts of magnetite.

== Diet ==
While larger chitons have been known to eat large algal blades, encrusting colonial animals, or even engage in predatory behavior to trap and consume mobile animals, Acanthochitona zelandica is a grazer and uses the radula to scrape algal films and built-up diatom layers off of tidal rocks.
