= Choneplax =

Scientific classification
- Domain: Eukaryota
- Kingdom: Animalia
- Phylum: Mollusca
- Class: Polyplacophora
- Order: Chitonida
- Family: Acanthochitonidae
- Genus: Choneplax; Carpenter & Dall, 1882

Genus of molluscs

Choneplax is a genus of chitons belonging to the family Acanthochitonidae.

The species of this genus are found in Central America and Africa.

Species:

- Choneplax indica Odhner, 1919
- Choneplax lata (Guilding, 1829)
- Choneplax littlerorum Sirenko, 2003
