= DeepWorker 2000 =

Submarine vehicle

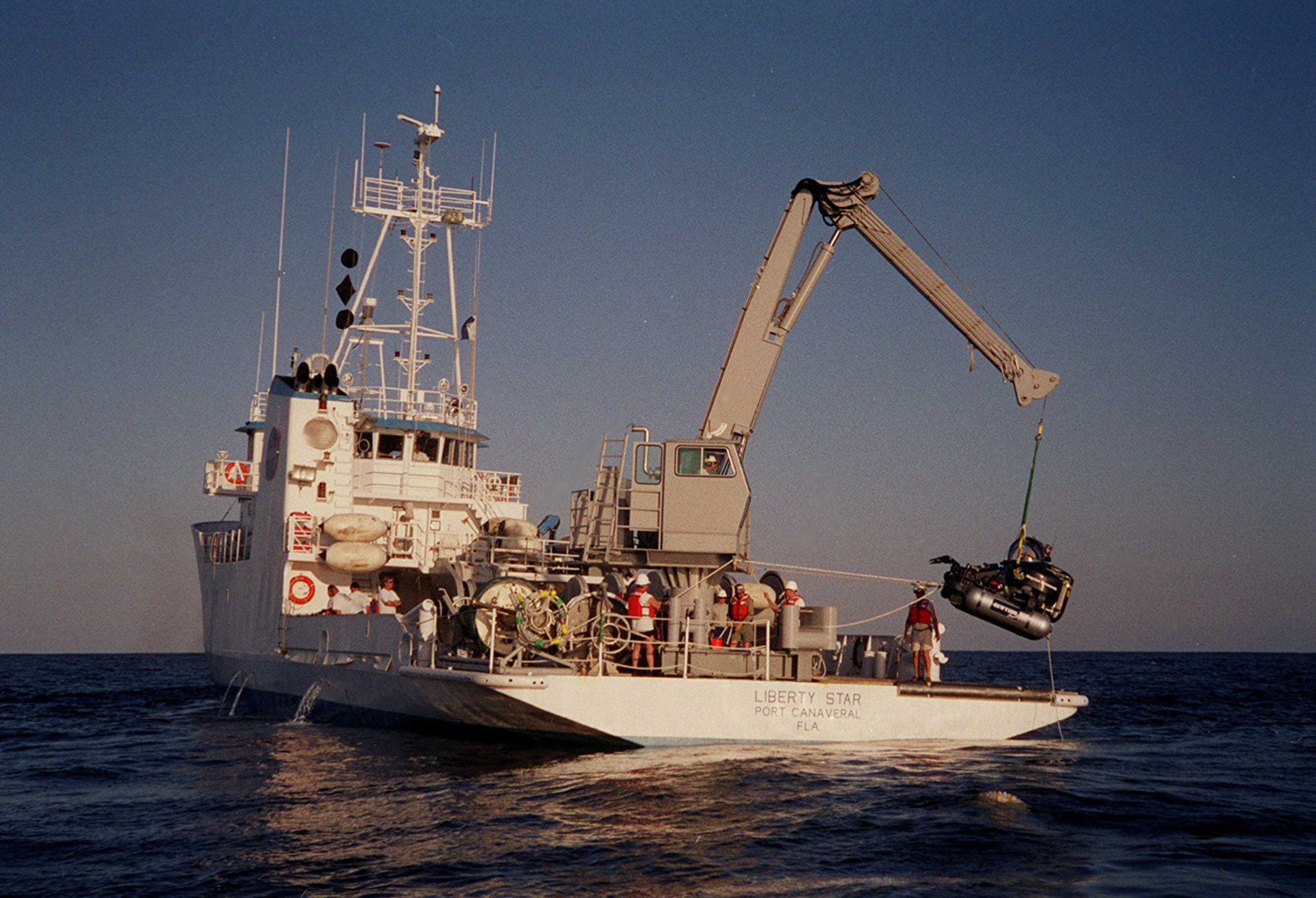
MV Liberty Star carrying the DeepWorker 2000 submersible

DeepWorker 2000 is a submarine vehicle developed by Nuytco Research, Ltd. It is capable of descending to a depth of 610 m (2001 ft) and remaining submerged for 12 hours. In 1999, it was deployed to the continental shelf and upper continental slope on a five-year mission in association with the National Geographic Society's Sustainable Seas Expeditions.

== Projects ==
In 1999, the DeepWorker 2000 submersible was used to quantify the species of fish as well as the space resources utilized within the Stellwagen Bank National Marine Sanctuary.

In 2000, DeepWorker 2000 was used for evaluating the coral reef system located in the Florida Middle Grounds.
