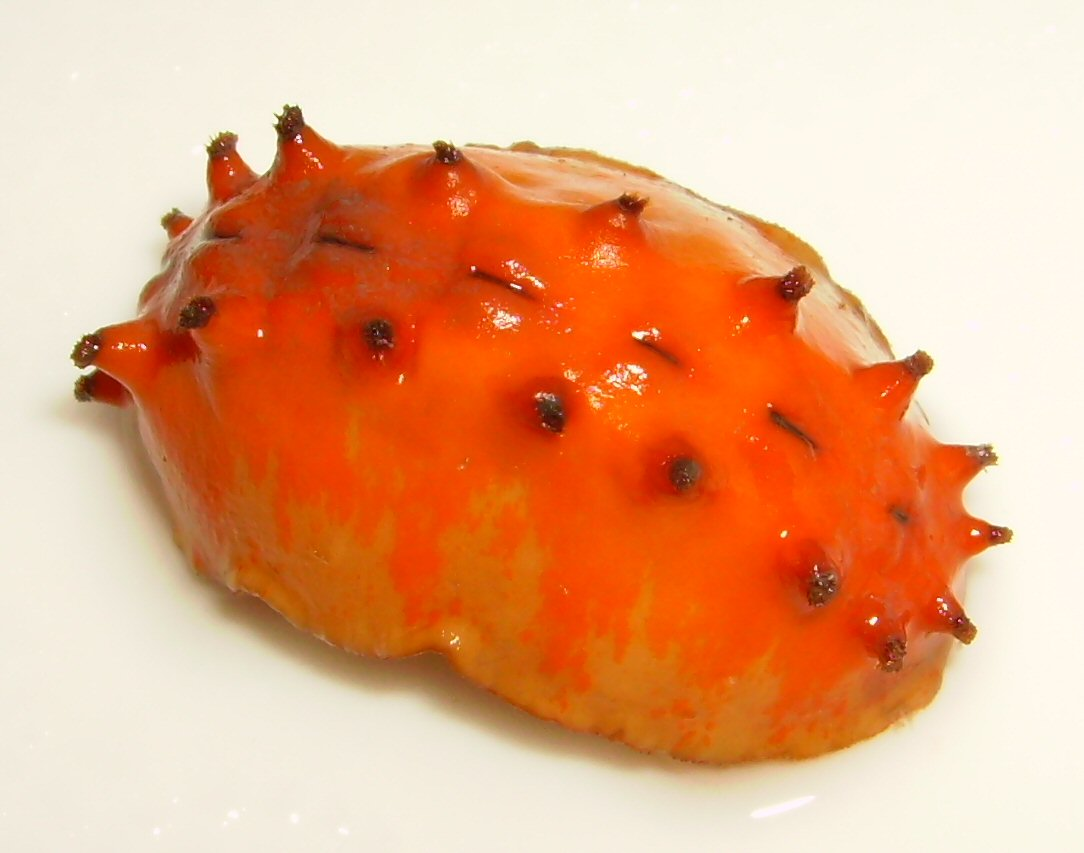
- The butterfly chiton, Cryptoconchus porosus.

Scientific classification
- Kingdom: Animalia
- Phylum: Mollusca
- Class: Polyplacophora
- Order: Chitonida
- Family: Acanthochitonidae
- Genus: Cryptoconchus; Blainville in Burrow, 1815

Species
- C. floridanus (Dall, 1889); C. porosus (Burrow, 1815)

= Cryptoconchus =

Cryptoconchus Temporal range: Pliocene–Recent

Genus of molluscs

Cryptoconchus is a genus of chitons in the family Acanthochitonidae.

== Species ==
- Cryptoconchus porosus - the butterfly chiton
- Cryptoconchus floridanus - the white-barred chiton

== Extinct species ==
The genus is also represented in the fossil record, in Pliocene and Pleistocene rocks.
