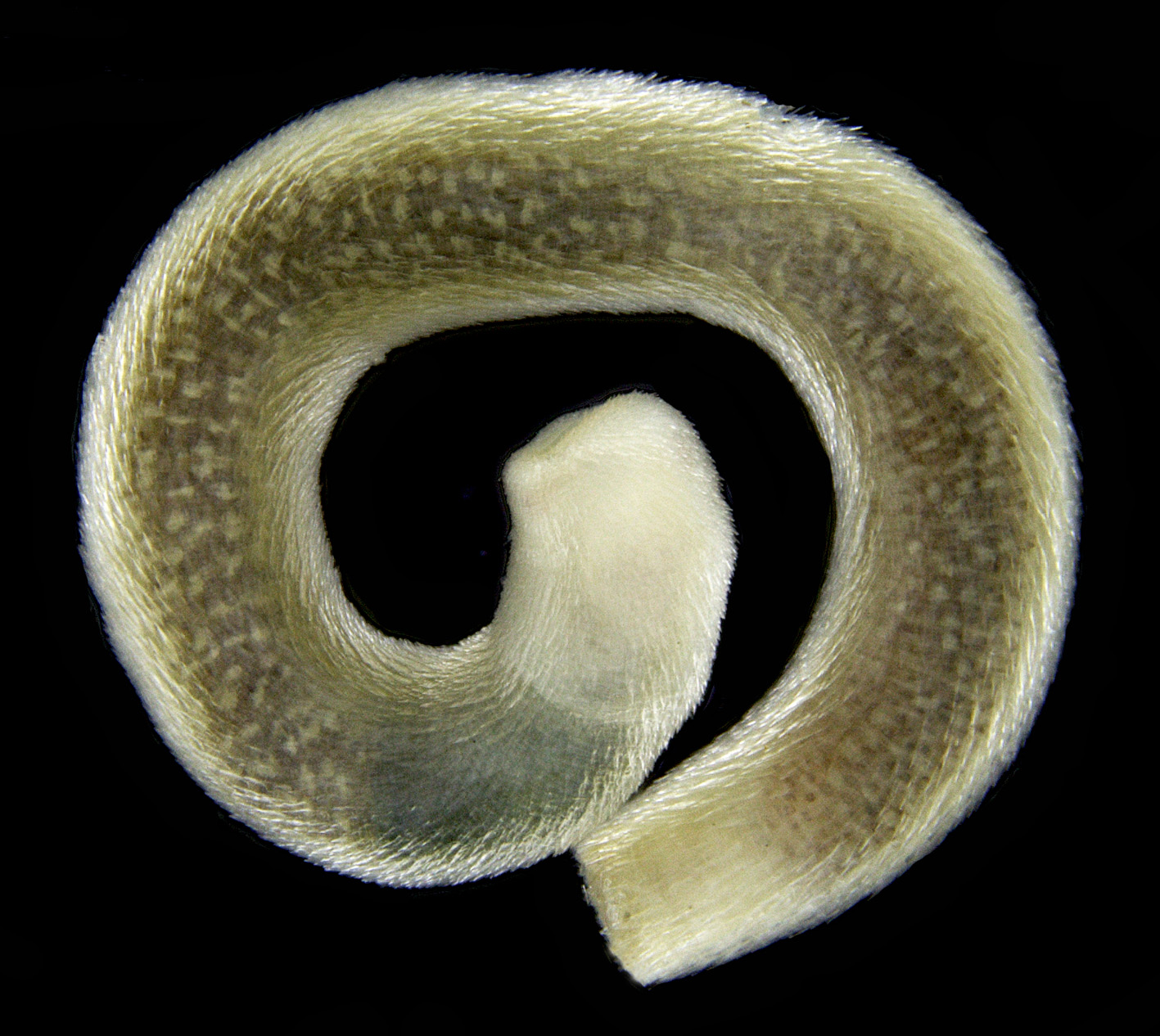
- Scutopus robustus

Scientific classification
- Kingdom: Animalia
- Phylum: Mollusca
- Class: Caudofoveata
- Order: Limifossorida
- Family: Scutopodidae
- Genus: Scutopus; Salvini-Plawen, 1968

= Scutopus =

Genus of molluscs

Scutopus is a genus of chaetoderm mollusc once assigned to the family Scutopodidae. Species in this genus include:

- Scutopus chilensis
- Scutopus megaradulatus
- Scutopus robustus
- Scutopus ventrolineatus
