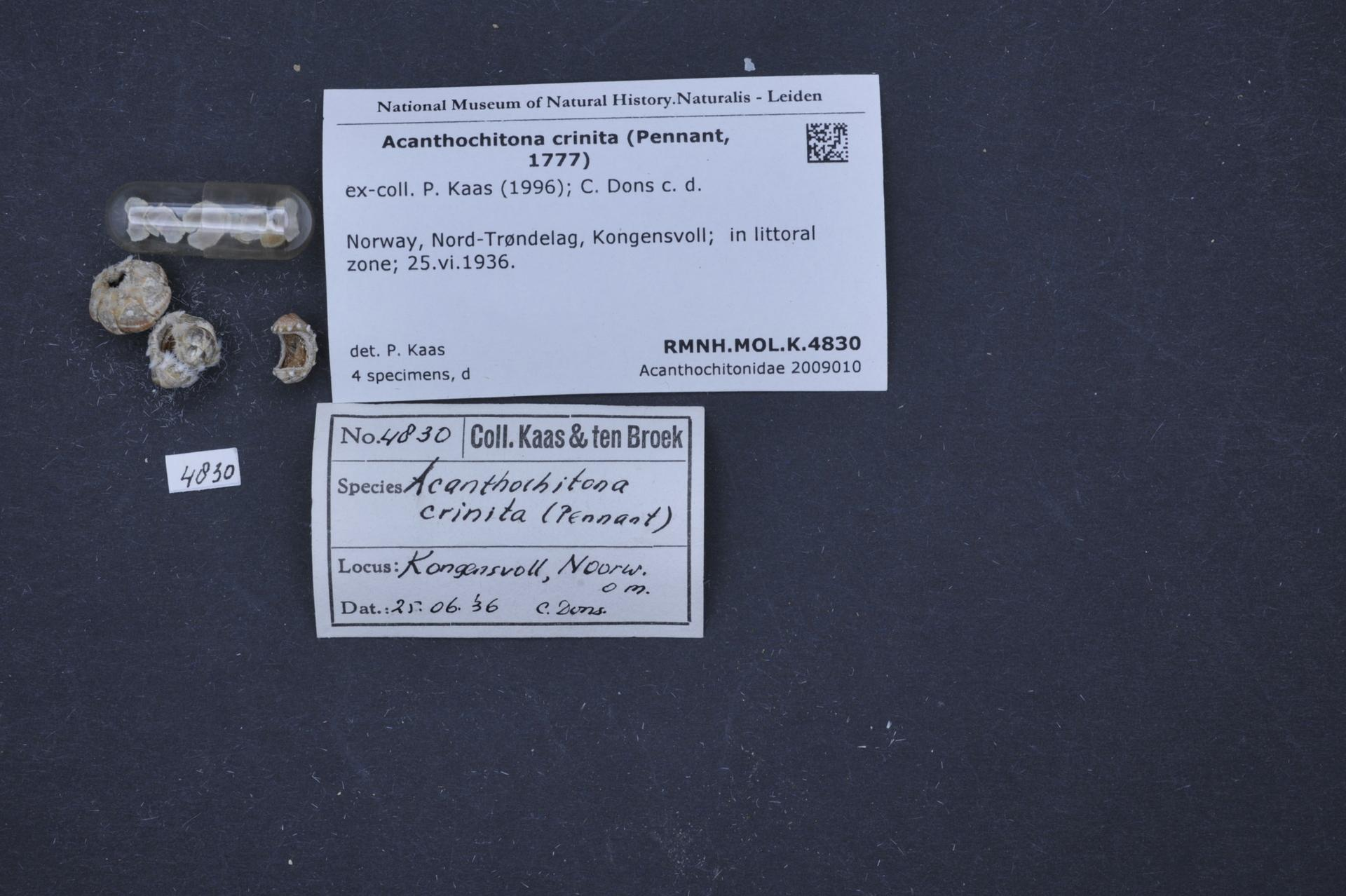
- Acanthochitona crinita specimens in Naturalis

Scientific classification
- Domain: Eukaryota
- Kingdom: Animalia
- Phylum: Mollusca
- Class: Polyplacophora
- Order: Chitonida
- Family: Acanthochitonidae
- Genus: Acanthochitona
- Species: A. crinita

Binomial name
- Acanthochitona crinita (Pennant, 1777)

Synonyms
- Acanthochaetes vulgaris Leach, 1852; Acanthochites adansoni Rochebrune, 1881; Acanthochites carinatus Risso, 1826; Acanthochiton adansoni (Rochebrune, 1881); Acanthochiton hispidus Palmer, 1945; Acanthochitona gracilis (Jeffreys, 1859); Chiton crinitus Pennant, 1777; Chiton onyx Spengler, 1797

= Acanthochitona crinita =

Species of mollusc

Acanthochitona crinita is a species of marine chiton in the family Acanthochitonidae. It is found on rocky coasts in the northeastern Atlantic Ocean, the North Sea and the Mediterranean Sea.

== Description ==
Acanthochitona crinita is oval, less than half as long as it is wide, and grows to a length of about 34 mm (1.34 in). Like other chitons, it bears a protective shell formed from eight articulating valves on its dorsal surface, these being embedded in a tough muscular girdle. The valves in this species are strongly arched with moderately rounded keels, and are finely sculpted longitudinally. The girdle bears 18 tufts of short bristles, four tufts at the front, and one on either side of the junctions between the plates. The dorsal surface is rough, with irregular granulations and fine spines. The colour is very variable, being some shade of grey, fawn, brown, pink, pale green or pale blue, often marbled or streaked.

== Distribution and habitat ==
Native to the northeastern Atlantic Ocean, A. crinita ranges from Norway and the North Sea, through the English Channel and the Bay of Biscay to the Mediterranean Sea. It is found on rocks on the lower shore and shallow sublittoral zone, especially areas with strong surf action. It tends to remain under stones to prevent desiccation when not immersed.

== Ecology ==
This species is herbivorous, and when submerged, especially at night, crawls about on the rock feeding. It uses its radula, which is armed with several rows of teeth, to graze on the coralline algae growing on the rock, also feeding on any unicellular algae forming a film there. Chitons have separate sexes, and fertilisation takes place in the mantle cavity of the female. The larvae have a short planktonic trochophore larval phase before settling to the seabed, undergoing metamorphosis and developing into juvenile chitons with six valve plates, which soon hide under stones. Chitons can adhere to the rock with a powerful suction grip.
