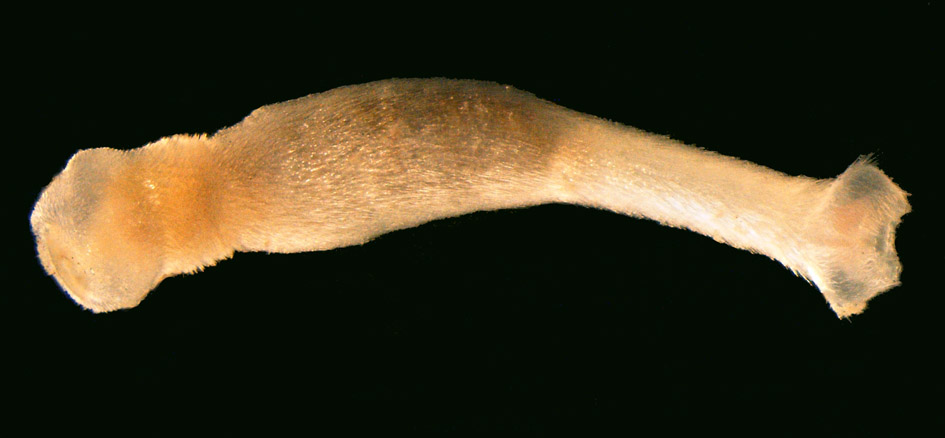
- Falcidens crossotus

Scientific classification
- Domain: Eukaryota
- Kingdom: Animalia
- Phylum: Mollusca
- Class: Caudofoveata
- Order: Chaetodermatida
- Family: Chaetodermatidae

Synonyms
- Falcidentidae

= Chaetodermatidae =

Family of molluscs

Chaetodermatidae is a family of molluscs belonging to the order Caudofoveata.

Genera:

- Chaetoderma Lovén, 1844
- Falcidens Salvini-Plawen, 1968
- Furcillidens Scheltema, 1998
