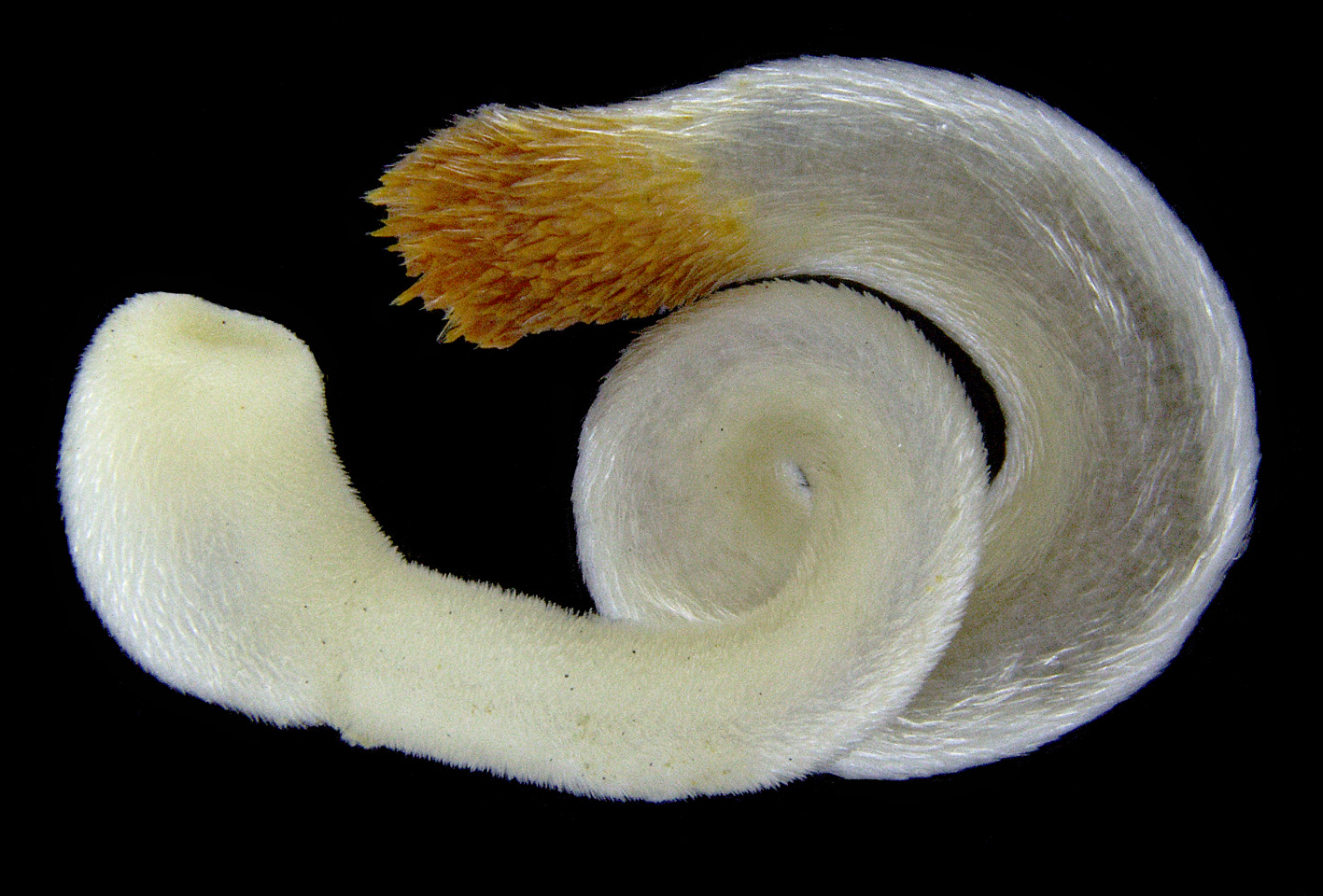
- Chaetoderma nitidulum

Scientific classification
- Kingdom: Animalia
- Phylum: Mollusca
- Class: Caudofoveata

Families and genera
- See text.

= Caudofoveata =

Class of molluscs

Caudofoveata is a small class within the phylum Mollusca, also known as Chaetodermomorpha. The class is often combined with Solenogastres and termed Aplacophora, but some studies have cast doubt on the monophyly of this group.

== Anatomy ==
The Caudofoveata are worm-like molluscs typically ranging 0.02–10 cm in size, but one species, Chaetoderma felderi, can reach 36.5 cm (14.4 in). The foot is completely absent, and instead of a shell their mantle is covered in calcareous spines called sclerites.

== Ecology ==
Caudofoveates live by burrowing through soft sediment, and feed by lying vertically in the sediment with just the mouthparts exposed and taking in passing organic detritus. During sexual reproduction, the female produces eggs which are fertilized and brooded, and then the larvae swim freely.

=== Diet ===
Caudofoveates are deposit feeders, or more selective detritivores or predators of foraminifera.

== Taxonomy ==
Caudofoveata comprises one order Chaetodermatida and three families, containing 14 genera:

- Order Chaetodermatida
  - Family Chaetodermatidae
    - Chaetoderma
    - Falcidens
    - Furcillidens
  - Family Limifossoridae
    - Limifossor
    - Metachaetoderma
    - Psilodens
    - Scutopus
  - Family Prochaetodermatidae
    - Chevroderma
    - Claviderma
    - Dacryomica
    - Lonchoderma
    - Niteomica
    - Prochaetoderma
    - Spathoderma
