= Chaetodermatida =

Scientific classification
- Domain: Eukaryota
- Kingdom: Animalia
- Phylum: Mollusca
- Class: Caudofoveata
- Order: Chaetodermatida

Order of molluscs

Chaetodermatida is an order of molluscs belonging to the class Caudofoveata.

Families:

- Chaetodermatidae
- Limifossoridae
- Prochaetodermatidae
