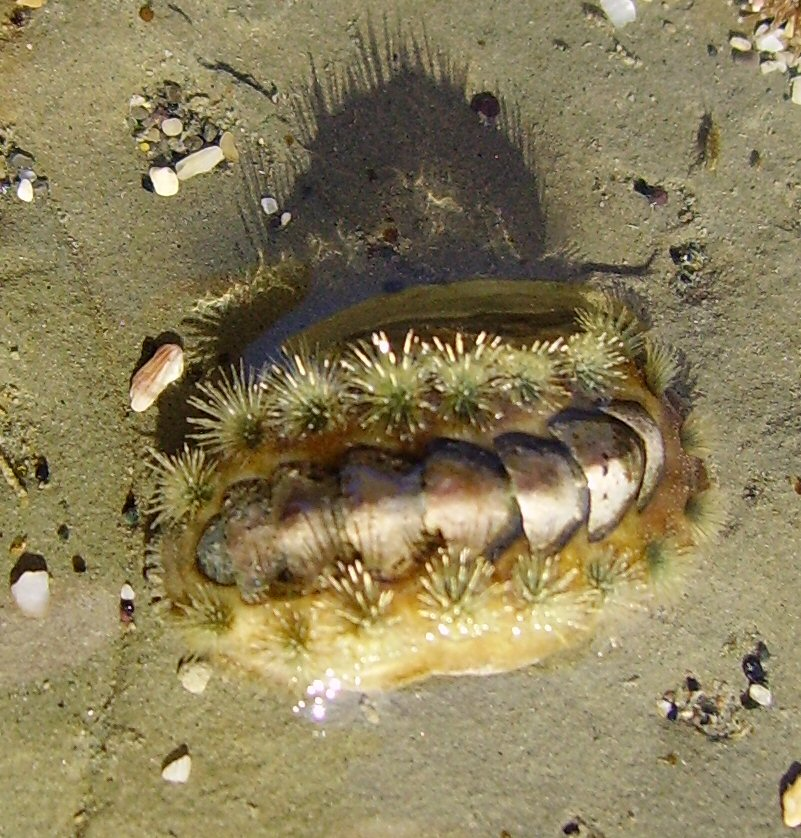
- Acanthochitona zelandica

Scientific classification
- Kingdom: Animalia
- Phylum: Mollusca
- Class: Polyplacophora
- Order: Chitonida
- Suborder: Acanthochitonina
- Family: Acanthochitonidae; Pilsbry, 1893

Synonyms
- Acanthochitidae

= Acanthochitonidae =

Family of molluscs

Acanthochitonidae is a family of marine mollusks belonging to the class Polyplacophora, commonly known as chitons. Species of the family is distributed widely most commonly around the Southern Hemisphere and the northeastern Atlantic.

== Description ==
Acanthochitonidae are characterized by sunken sutural tufts in the well-expanded girdle (chiton). The girdles are also scales or spicules to stick to rocky surfaces and a radula which allows them to feed.

== Habitat ==
Acanthochitonidae chitons are found in a variety of marine habitats, including rocky intertidal and subtidal zones, specifically rocky shores, reefs, and kelp forests.

== Taxonomy ==
The family Acanthochitonidae includes around 80 species, distributed across 12 genera and 2 subfamily.

== Genera ==
The following genera are included in this family:

Subfamily Acanthochitoninae Pilsbry, 1893

- Acanthochitona Gray, 1821
- Americhiton Watters, 1990
- Bassethullia Pilsbry, 1928
- Choneplax Carpenter MS, Dall, 1882
- Craspedochiton Shuttleworth, 1853
- Craspedoplax Iredale & Hull, 1925
- Cryptoconchus de Blainville MS, Burrow, 1815
- Leptoplax Carpenter MS, Dall, 1882
- Notoplax H. Adams, 1862
- Pseudotonicia Ashby, 1928
