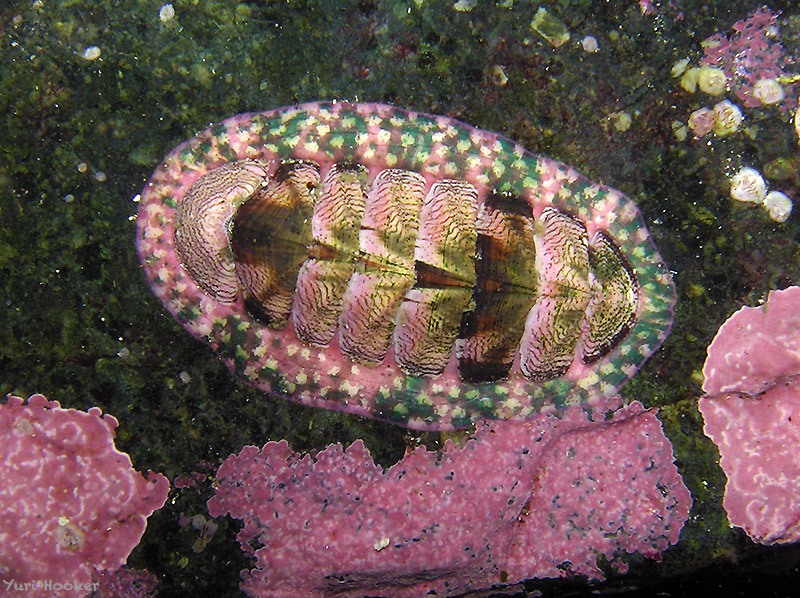
- Tonicia chilensis from Peru

Scientific classification
- Kingdom: Animalia
- Phylum: Mollusca
- Class: Polyplacophora
- Order: Chitonida
- Family: Chitonidae
- Genus: Tonicia; Gray, 1847

Type species
- Chiton elegans Frembly, 1827

Synonyms
- Chiton (Tonicia) Gray, 1847; Rapanuia Dell'Angelo, Raines & Bonfitto, 2004; Tonicia (Tonicia) Gray, 1847 · alternate representation

= Tonicia =

Genus of molluscs

Tonicia is a genus of chitons in the subfamily Toniciinae of the family Chitonidae.

The genus was recently restricted to include only 12 New World species, with the more species-rich and exclusively Old World subgenus Lucilina Dall, 1882, being elevated to a separate genus. Of these 12, ten species are found in the eastern Pacific, one in the Magellan province (southern Chile, Argentina and Falkland Islands) and one in the Caribbean Sea (Florida to Barbados).

However, a study published in 2019 which used molecular systematics to compare the eastern Pacific Tonicia species suggested that there are only 9 extant species in the eastern Pacific.

== Species ==
- Tonicia argyrosticta (Philippi, 1845)
- Tonicia arnheimi Dall, 1903
- Tonicia atrata Sowerby II, 1840
- Tonicia chilensis Frembly, 1827
- Tonicia disalvoi (Dell'Angelo, Raines & Bonfitto, 2004)
- Tonicia disjuncta Frembly, 1827
- † Tonicia edwardsi Rochebrune, 1883
- Tonicia forbesii Carpenter, 1857
- Tonicia horniana Rochebrune, 1889
- † Tonicia pannonica Szőts, 1953
- Tonicia rubridens Pilsbry, 1892
- Tonicia schrammi (Shuttleworth, 1856)
- Tonicia smithi Leloup, 1980
- Tonicia swainsoni Sowerby I in Broderip & Sowerby, 1832

== Synonyms ==
- Tonicia atrata Hutton, 1880: synonym of Plaxiphora (Plaxiphora) aurata (Spalowsky, 1795) represented as Plaxiphora aurata (Spalowsky, 1795) (invalid: junior homonym of Tonicia atrata (G.B. Sowerby II, 1840); Tonicia subatrata Pilsbry, 1893 is a replacement name)
- Tonicia boetica Pilsbry, 1893: synonym of Tonicia atrata (G. B. Sowerby II, 1840)
- Tonicia calbucensis Plate, 1898: synonym of Tonicia lebruni Rochebrune, 1884: synonym of Tonicia argyrosticta (Philippi, 1845)
- Tonicia atrata Hutton, 1880: synonym of Plaxiphora (Plaxiphora) aurata (Spalowsky, 1795) represented as Plaxiphora aurata (Spalowsky, 1795) (invalid: junior homonym of Tonicia atrata (G.B. Sowerby II, 1840); Tonicia subatrata Pilsbry, 1893 is a replacement name)
- Tonicia boetica Pilsbry, 1893: synonym of Tonicia atrata (G. B. Sowerby II, 1840)
- Tonicia elegans Frembly, 1827: synonym of Tonicia chilensis (Frembly, 1827)
- Tonicia fastigiata (G. B. Sowerby II, 1840): synonym of Tonicia atrata (G. B. Sowerby II, 1840)
- Tonicia fontainei Rochebrune, 1882: synonym of Ischnochiton punctulatissimus (G. B. Sowerby I, 1832)
- Tonicia fremblyana Kaas, 1956: synonym of Tonicia chilensis (Frembly, 1827)
- Tonicia gambiensis Rochebrune, 1881: synonym of Chaetopleura (Chaetopleura) gambiensis (Rochebrune, 1881) represented as Chaetopleura gambiensis (Rochebrune, 1881) (original combination)
- Tonicia gaudichaudi Rochebrune, 1884: synonym of Ischnochiton punctulatissimus (G. B. Sowerby I, 1832)
- Tonicia greyi Filhol, 1880: synonym of Ischnochiton circumvallatus (Reeve, 1847)
- Tonicia hullianus Torr, 1911: synonym of Lucilina hulliana (Torr, 1911) (original combination)
- Tonicia indica Leloup, 1981: synonym of Tonicia (Lucilina) carnosa Kaas, 1979: synonym of Lucilina carnosa (Kaas, 1979) (original combination)
- Tonicia jugosulcata Pilsbry, 1893: synonym of Lucilina truncata (G. B. Sowerby II, 1841)
- Tonicia lebruni de Rochebrune, 1884: synonym of Tonicia argyrosticta (Philippi, 1845)
- Tonicia martiali Rochebrune in Rochebrune & Mabille, 1889: synonym of Nuttallochiton martiali (Rochebrune, 1889) (original combination)
- Tonicia mixta Dall, 1919: synonym of Chaetopleura (Pallochiton) lanuginosa mixta (Dall, 1919) represented as Chaetopleura lanuginosa mixta (Dall, 1919) (original combination)
- Tonicia novemrugata Bergenhayn, 1930: synonym of Lucilina novemrugata (Bergenhayn, 1930) (original combination)
- Tonicia pectinoides Sykes, 1903: synonym of Lucilina pectinoides (Sykes, 1903) (original combination)
- Tonicia perligera (Thiele, 1909): synonym of Lucilina perligera Thiele, 1909 (incorrect placement)
- Tonicia polyomma Bergenhayn, 1932: synonym of Lucilina polyomma (Bergenhayn, 1932) (original combination)
- Tonicia prashadi Leloup, 1937: synonym of Tonicia pectinoides Sykes, 1903: synonym of Lucilina pectinoides (Sykes, 1903)
- Tonicia ptygmata Rochebrune, 1884: synonym of Lucilina sueziensis (Reeve, 1847)
- Tonicia reticulata Nierstrasz, 1905: synonym of Lucilina reticulata (Nierstrasz, 1905) (original combination)
- Tonicia rubiginosa F. W. Hutton, 1872: synonym of Notoplax rubiginosa (F. W. Hutton, 1872) (original combination)
- Tonicia sowerbyi Nierstrasz, 1905: synonym of Lucilina sowerbyi (Nierstrasz, 1905) (original combination)
- Tonicia subatrata Pilsbry, 1893: synonym of Plaxiphora (Plaxiphora) aurata (Spalowsky, 1795) represented as Plaxiphora aurata (Spalowsky, 1795)
- Tonicia suezensis; auct.: synonym of Lucilina sueziensis (Reeve, 1847) (incorrect spelling)
- Tonicia tydemani Nierstrasz, 1905: synonym of Lucilina tydemani (Nierstrasz, 1905) (original combination)
- Tonicia variegata Nierstrasz, 1905: synonym of Lucilina variegata (Nierstrasz, 1905) (original combination)
- Tonicia zigzag Hutton, 1872: synonym of Plaxiphora caelata (Reeve, 1847)
