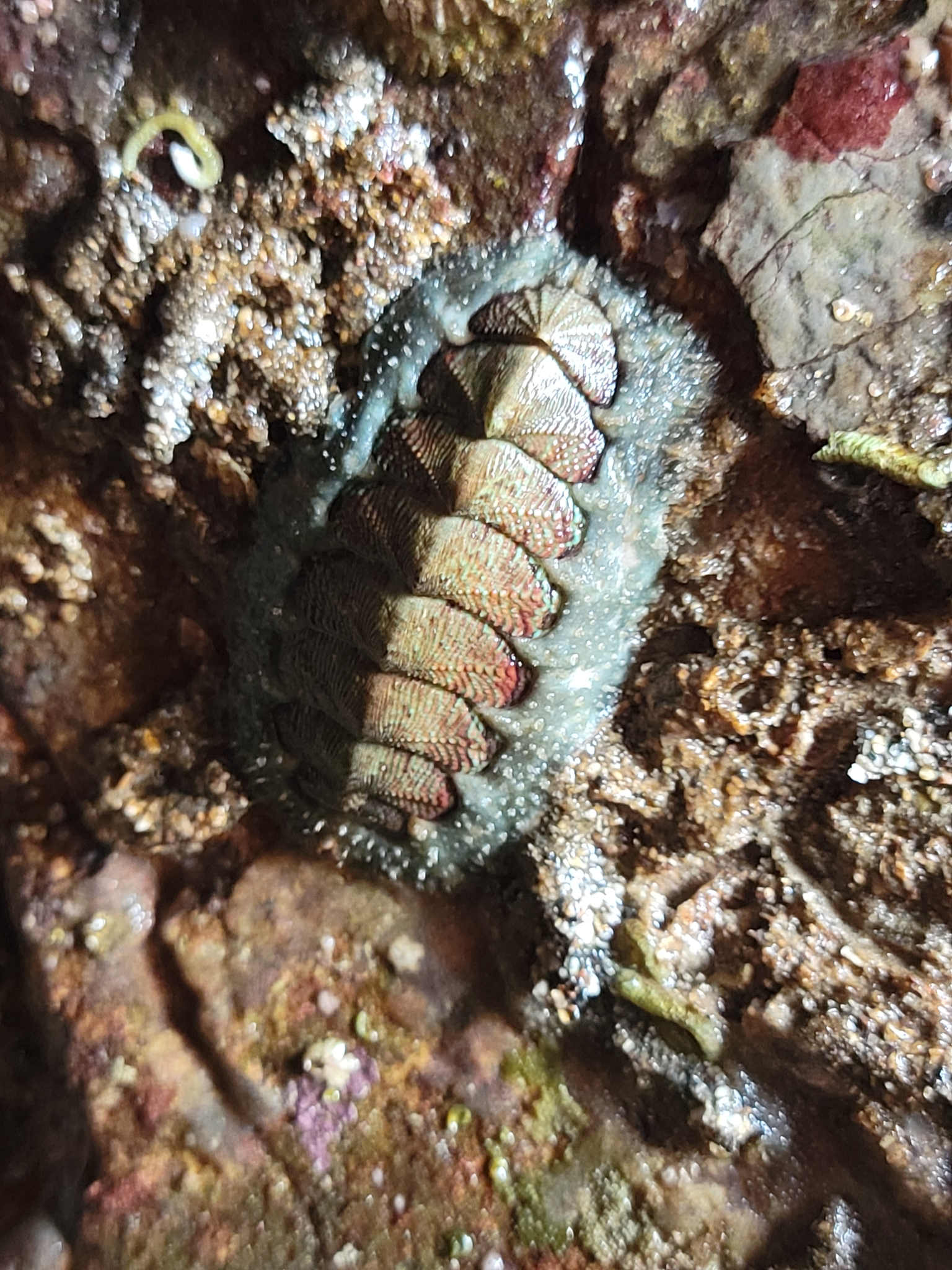
- Hairy chiton near Avila Beach, California, United States

Scientific classification
- Domain: Eukaryota
- Kingdom: Animalia
- Phylum: Mollusca
- Class: Polyplacophora
- Order: Chitonida
- Family: Mopaliidae
- Genus: Mopalia
- Species: M. ciliata

Binomial name
- Mopalia ciliata Sowerby, 1840

= Mopalia ciliata =

Species of mollusc

Mopalia ciliata is a chiton in the genus Mopalia, commonly known as the hairy chiton. It is a medium-sized marine mollusc up to 5.0 cm (2.0 in) in length. It is oval shaped with 8 separate, moderately elevated, overlapping ridged valves on its dorsal surface. Hairy chitons can be found along the coast of North America.

== Distribution and habitat ==
The distribution of Mopalia ciliata is somewhat controversial, however it is agreed that it resides on the southern coast of North America as far south as Baja California. The presence of this species north of California is currently debated whether it be a similar species M. kennerleyi. M. ciliata are found on the underside of rocks near cracks or crevices or other hard stubstrata in intertidal zones.

== Color ==
M. ciliata's valve colors mainly vary between pale green, white or dark brown. They can have colorful markings sometimes of olive, white, orange, red and blue. The girdle color can be dark green, pinkish or white.

== Diet ==
This species is an omnivore. They feed on algae, bryozoans, hydroids and other low-growing organisms.

== Biology ==
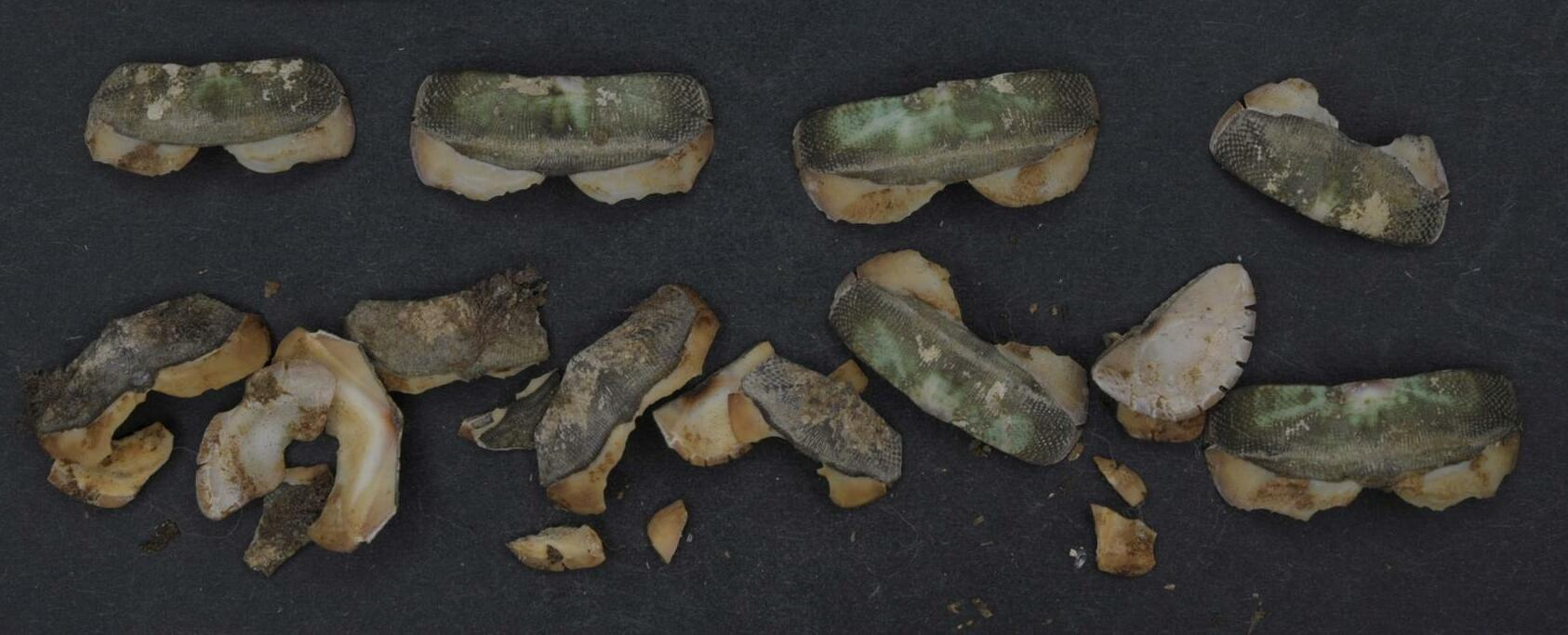
Preserved specimens of Mopalia ciliata from the Naturalis Biodiversity Center in the Netherlands.

A chiton has a dorsal side composed of eight valves embedded in the mantle tissue. Surrounding the valves is their thick mantle called the girdle. The valves are strong enough for protection, but shaped so that their bodies are flexible for moving on uneven rocks and turning into crevices. Mopalia species' girdles are covered with large setae that distinguish them from other genera.

On their ventral surface they have a partial head, mouth, mantle, mantle cavity, foot, gills, gonopore, nephridiopore and anus. The ventral surface is bordered with the mantle and moving towards the center of the chiton is the mantle cavity. There they have a head on the anterior end and the foot below it extending to the posterior end of the chiton. The mantle cavity is divided into two chambers by ctenidia that circulate water and waste through the chiton. The gill cilia draw in water through the incurrent chamber and run posteriorly in the excurrent stream where they are discharged.

The foot runs the length of the entire ventral surface yet does not extend past the girdle. Its way of motion is by moving its foot in small waves of muscular activity. It is termed as pedal waves. It also uses its foot for holding on to the substrate. They do this by lifting up the central portion of the foot, while retaining a tight seal on the outer portion of the foot. This creates a tight suction against the substrate and allows them to live in heavy wave zones.

Their head is seen only as a partial head because they have no brain or eyes, but they are still responsive to possible predators and waves by creating suction or curling up in a ball.

The radula, made of 17 teeth, has one pair of cusps in each row hardened with magnetite, which makes chiton the only mollusc with these specialized magnetite teeth. They also have a subradular organ that is used for taste.

=== Characteristics ===
Valves

The valves are not always similar. They can vary from broad, to narrow plates as well as smooth or coarse plates. The plates are all notched posteriorly and have radial rows of pustules.

Girdle

The girdle is half to three-quarters the width of the valves. The girdle is studded with spines of spiculed setae.

Setae

The setae are very distinct if viewed under a scanning electron microscope. They have flat and broad setae, which bare found rows of large, curved white calcareous spicules. These are up to 600 micrometers (0.024 in) in length.

Radula

The radula are not very distinguishable. In size they are proportionally 20% smaller than M. kennerleyi, a similar species.

Canal

M. ciliata shares aesthete canal characteristics with M. spectabilis and M. swanii. They have a wider range of the slit ray canals that turn downwards towards the slit rays opposed to the short distance other Mopalia species have their slit ray canals extended. Another similarity between these three species is their horizontal canals that flank the jugal area fan out laterally opposed to straight.
