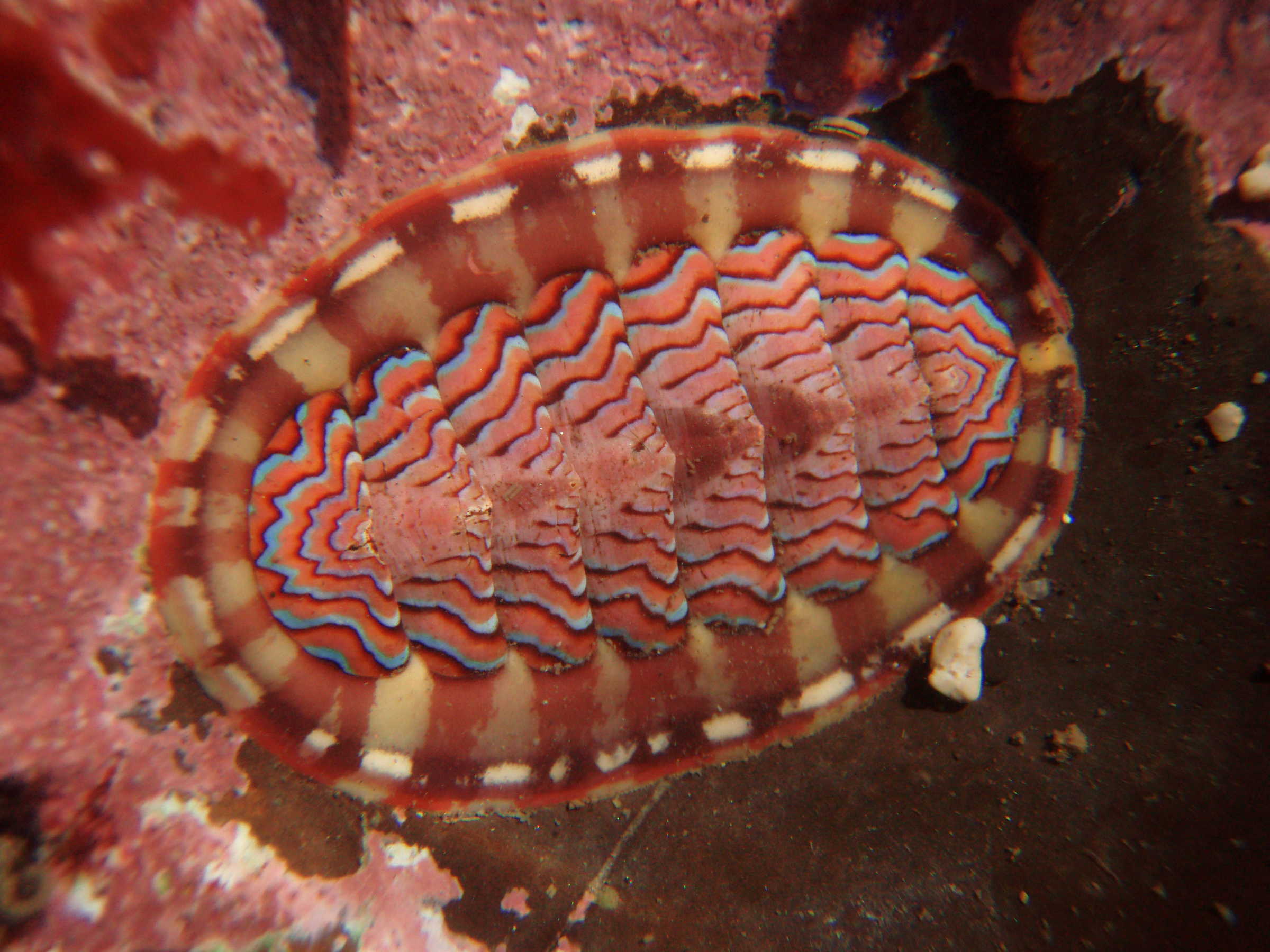

Scientific classification
- Domain: Eukaryota
- Kingdom: Animalia
- Phylum: Mollusca
- Class: Polyplacophora
- Order: Chitonida
- Family: Tonicellidae
- Genus: Tonicella
- Species: T. lokii

Binomial name
- Tonicella lokii Clark, 1999

= Tonicella lokii =

Species of mollusc

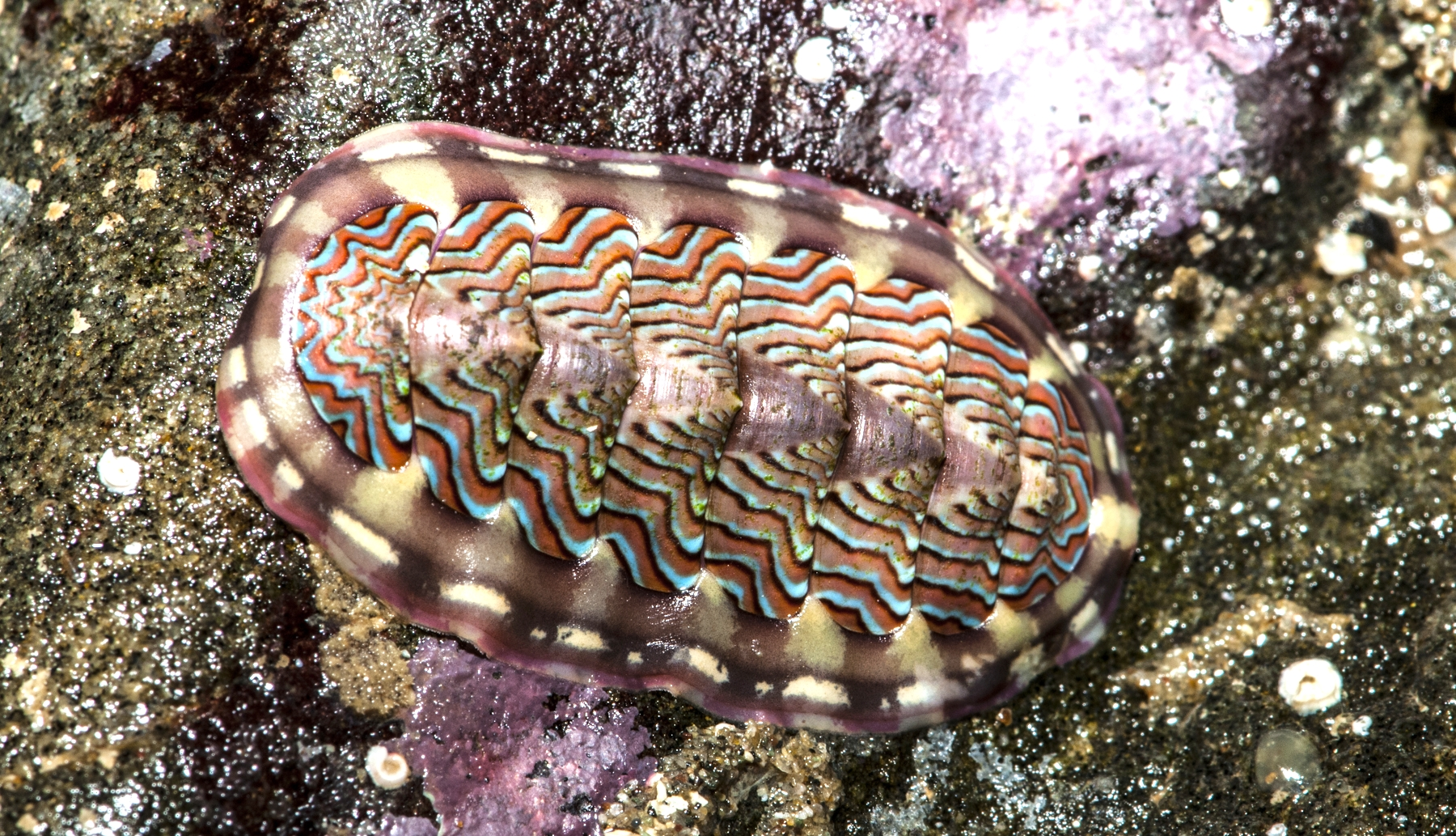
Loki's chiton (Tonicella lokii), near Cambria, California

Tonicella lokii, commonly known as the flame lined chiton or Loki's chiton, is a chiton in the lined chiton genus Tonicella.

== Size and description ==
Like most chitons in this genus, T. lokii has blue, white, purple or black zig-zaged lines on each of the eight valves. The background color of the valves is often brown or red, but can also be bright blue or yellow to orange. The girdle is hairless and brown to red or pink. It has radiating bands and often bears a yellow or white broken concentric line, alternating with radiating bands.

== Similar species ==
Tonicella lineata is extremely similar but does not have radiating bands on the girdle. Tonicella undocaerulea is also very similar but does not have the radiating bands on the girdle and also lacks a dark border to the concentric blue lines on the anterior plate. Mopalia spectabilis looks superficially similar due to its bright blue wavy lines on the valves and its radiating bands on the girdle, but differs in having a hairy girdle.
