= T. insignis =

T. insignis may refer to:

- Tetraceratops insignis, a lizard-like synapsid species that lived during the Early Permian period
- Thamnochortus insignis, a grass-like restio species found in Africa
- Thamnophilus insignis, the streak-backed antshrike, a bird species found in Brazil, Guyana and Venezuela
- Thaumastoptera insignis, a crane fly species in the genus Thaumastoptera
- Thyreus insignis, a bee species in the genus Thyreus
- Tityus insignis, a scorpion species in the genus Tityus
- Tonicella insignis, a chiton species in the genus Tonicella
- Torellia insignis, a sea snail species
- Trachelyopterus insignis, a species of catfish
- Trochisciopsis insignis, an alga species in the genus Trochisciopsis

== Synonyms ==
- Tadarida insignis, a synonym for Tadarida teniotis, the European free-tailed bat, a bat species found across the Old World
