= Plaxiphora boydeni =

Scientific classification
- Domain: Eukaryota
- Kingdom: Animalia
- Phylum: Mollusca
- Class: Polyplacophora
- Order: Chitonida
- Family: Mopaliidae
- Genus: Plaxiphora
- Species: P. boydeni

Binomial name
- Plaxiphora boydeni Murdoch, 1982

Species of mollusc

Plaxiphora boydeni is a small uncommon chiton in the family Mopaliidae, endemic to the East Coast of the South Island, New Zealand, Stewart Island and the Chatham and Subantarctic Islands.

== Description and habitat ==
A flat oval chiton with an undistinguished appearance and no distinct markings on the eroded valves apart from the occasional white blotch. Girdle narrow, cream to mid-brown, also with occasional white blotches, covered in nodules. Usually attached to open rock surfaces on wave-exposed shores in the mid to low intertidal zone.
