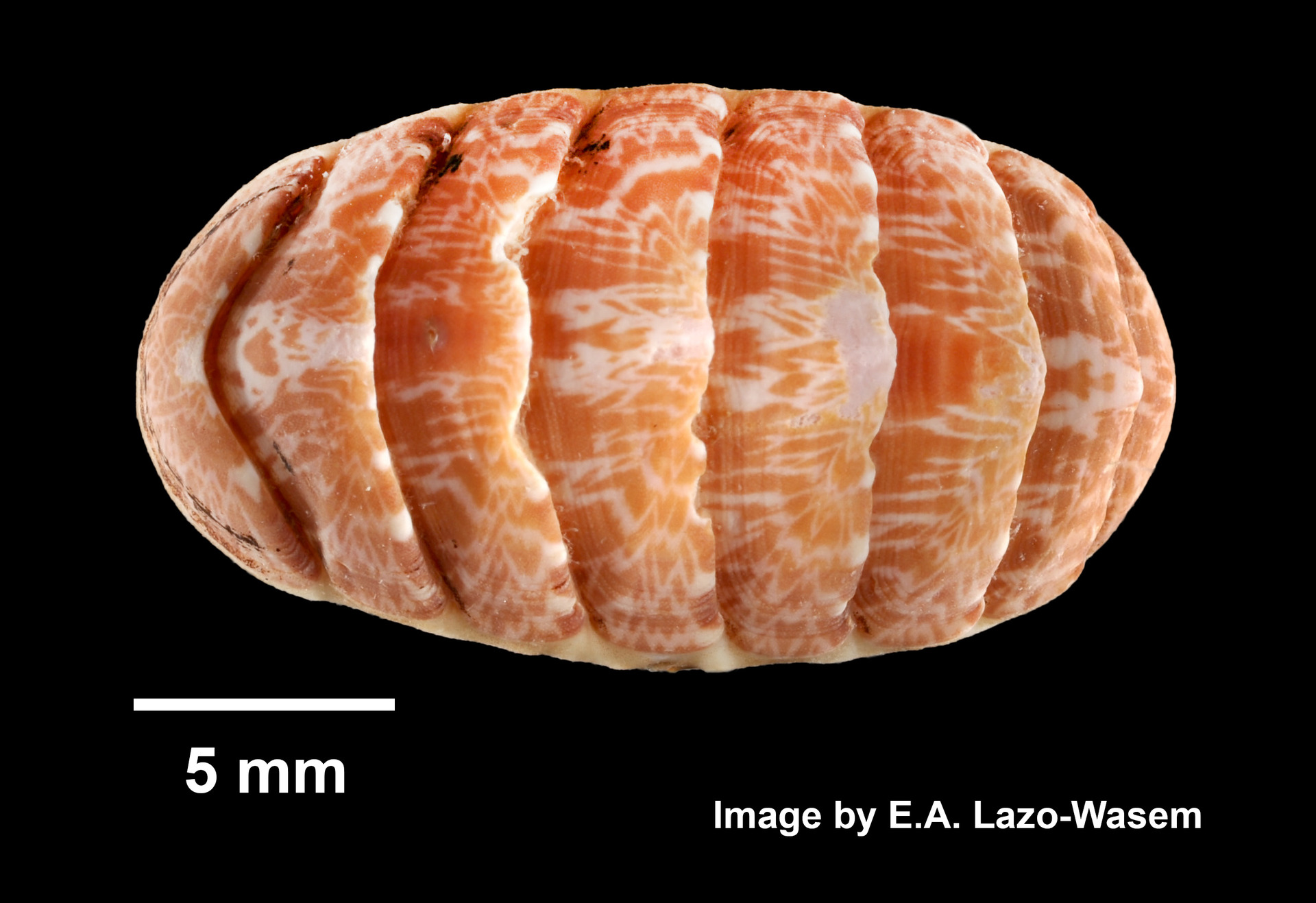

Scientific classification
- Domain: Eukaryota
- Kingdom: Animalia
- Phylum: Mollusca
- Class: Polyplacophora
- Order: Chitonida
- Family: Tonicellidae
- Genus: Tonicella
- Species: T. marmorea

Binomial name
- Tonicella marmorea (O. Fabricius, 1780)

Synonyms
- Chiton flemingius Leach, 1852; Chiton fulminatus Couthouy, 1838; Chiton laevigatus J. Fleming, 1813; Chiton latus R. T. Lowe, 1825; Chiton marmoreus Fabricius, 1780; Chiton pictus Bean in Thorpe, 1844; Chiton submarmoreus Middendorff, 1847; Tonicella blaneyi Dall, 1905

= Tonicella marmorea =

Species of mollusc

Tonicella marmorea is a species of chiton, a polyplacophoran mollusc found in the Arctic Ocean and the North Atlantic Ocean. It was first described by the Danish missionary and naturalist Otto Fabricius.

== Description ==
Tonicella marmorea is broadly oval and grows to a length of about 4 cm (1.6 in). The eight plates of which the shell is composed are smooth and glossy, reddish-brown, marbled or patterned with intricate pale brown or white zigzag lines. The girdle which surrounds the shell is wide, thin and leathery, and also reddish-brown. Round its margin are small, flattened spines in red, purple or green, sometimes with paler bands. There are 17 to 25 pairs of gills, usually in the posterior part of the mantle groove, but sometimes scattered along the groove. On the ventral side is the yellowish muscular foot, with the mouth at the anterior end and the anus at the posterior end. In the northwestern Atlantic the colouring may vary.

== Distribution and habitat ==
This species occurs in the Arctic Ocean and the North Atlantic Ocean. Its range includes the eastern coast of North America, Greenland, Norway, Sweden, and Britain, where it is largely confined to Scotland, Northern Ireland and northern England. It is quite common in Scottish sea lochs, and it has been common in Strangford Lough, but is becoming less so. It lives on rocks, and on and under pebbles at depths from the littoral zone down to about 200 m (660 ft).

== Ecology ==
Tonicella marmorea has a strong muscular foot that enables it to grip the substrate firmly; the plates have individual bundles of muscle fibres and this allows it to conform to the irregularities of the rock surface. If it becomes detached from the substrate, it can roll itself defensively into a ball. It lacks eyes or sensory organs on the head, but instead has aesthetes on its plates and girdle; these are sensory organs and function as a dispersed, compound eye. Beneath the mantle, cilia on the gills create a water current for respiration, and this current also carries away waste products. In its feeding habits, the chiton resembles a gastropod, grazing on algae with its reinforced radula. However, it differs from a gastropod in having a long, coiled gut, and forming faecal pellets, which pass out with the water current.

The sexes are separate in this species. The gametes pass out with the water current and are liberated into the sea. In many chiton species, the timing of liberation of gametes is synchronized with the phase of the moon and the tides. The larvae are planktonic and when sufficiently developed, settle on the seabed and undergo metamorphosis into juveniles without passing through an intervening veliger stage.
