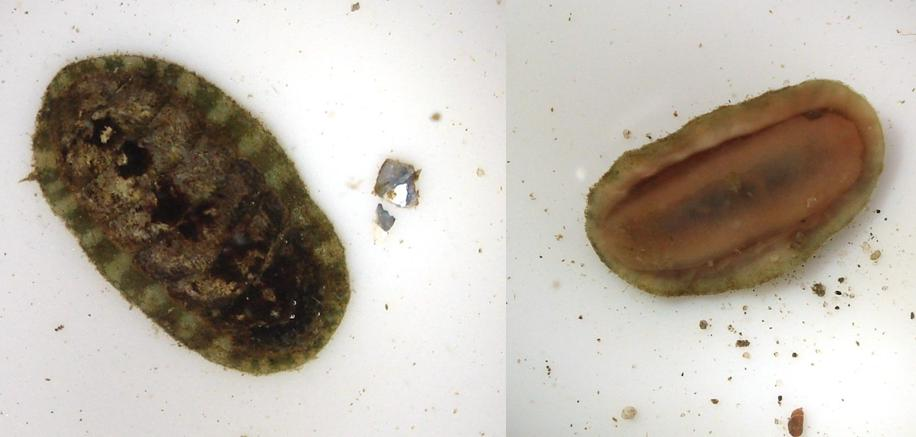
- Top and underside of Lepidochitona cinerea

Scientific classification
- Kingdom: Animalia
- Phylum: Mollusca
- Class: Polyplacophora
- Order: Chitonida
- Family: Tonicellidae
- Genus: Lepidochitona
- Species: L. cinerea

Binomial name
- Lepidochitona cinerea Linnaeus, 1767

= Lepidochitona cinerea =

Species of mollusc

Lepidochitona cinerea, known by the common names common chiton or gray chiton, is a species of chiton, a marine polyplacophoran mollusc in the family Tonicellidae.

== Distribution ==
Lepidochitona cinerea is found in the North Sea and on the coastal region of the Black Sea.

== Description ==
Lepidochitona cinerea is a broadly oval mollusc that grows up to 24 mm long.
