= Tonicella undocaerulea =

Blue lined chiton

Scientific classification
- Domain: Eukaryota
- Kingdom: Animalia
- Phylum: Mollusca
- Class: Polyplacophora
- Order: Chitonida
- Family: Tonicellidae
- Genus: Tonicella
- Species: T. undocaerulea

Binomial name
- Tonicella undocaerulea Sirenko, 1973

Species of mollusc

Tonicella undocaerulea, commonly known as the blue lined chiton, is a species of chiton.

== Size and description ==
The blue-lined chiton features a head plate adorned with zigzagging white concentric lines, which may appear blue while the creature is alive, and lacks a dark border. When in its vibrant state, it often exhibits vivid electric blue stripes and specks. The girdle of this chiton is typically hairless and showcases hues ranging from brown to red or pink, often accompanied by mottling in yellow or white.

== Similar species ==
Tonicella lineata is very similar but has a dark border to the concentric blue lines on the anterior plate. Tonicella lokii is also similar but has radiating bands on the girdle. Mopalia spectabilis looks superficially similar due to its bright blue wavy lines on the valves, but has a hairy girdle.

== Distribution and habitat ==
The natural range of T. undocaerulea stretches from Kodiak, Alaska to Point Conception, California. It is commonly found on rocks in low intertidal and shallow subtidal waters.

== Biology ==
This chiton grazes on coralline algae.
