= Amicula =

Amicula may refer to:

- Amicula (chiton), a genus of chitons in the family Mopaliidae
- Amicula (alga), a genus of algae in the family Naviculaceae
