= Maorichiton schauinslandi =

Scientific classification
- Kingdom: Animalia
- Phylum: Mollusca
- Class: Polyplacophora
- Order: Chitonida
- Family: Mopaliidae
- Genus: Maorichiton
- Species: M. schauinslandi

Binomial name
- Maorichiton schauinslandi (Thiele, 1909)

Synonyms
- Plaxiphora schauinslandi Thiele, 1909

Species of mollusc

Maorichiton schauinslandi is a species of chiton in the family Mopaliidae.

== Distribution ==
New Zealand
