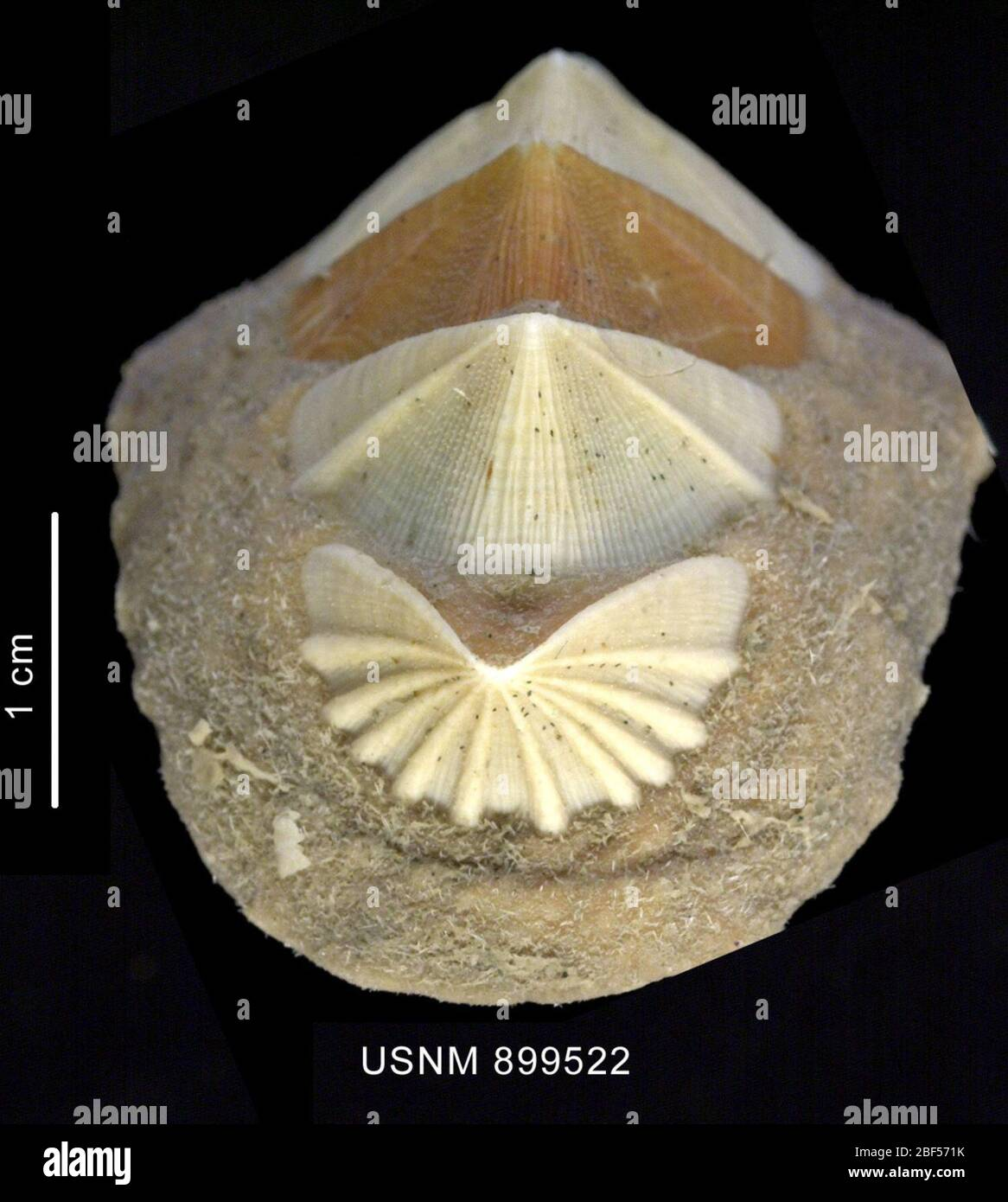

Scientific classification
- Kingdom: Animalia
- Phylum: Mollusca
- Class: Polyplacophora
- Order: Chitonida
- Family: Mopaliidae
- Genus: Nuttallochiton
- Species: N. mirandus

Binomial name
- Nuttallochiton mirandus Thiele, 1906

Synonyms
- Notochiton mirandus

= Nuttallochiton mirandus =

Species of polyplacophoran mollusc

Nuttallochiton mirandus is a medium to large-sized species of polyplacophoran mollusc in the family Mopaliidae. It was initially described by the zoologist Johannes Thiele in 1906 and is endemic to Antartica's cold waters.

== Description ==
Nuttallochiton mirandus is medium to large in size, measuring between 30 mm (1.2 in) to 120 mm (4.7 in) long. It has a creamy white shell, sometimes stained reddish brow which is very elevated and appears saw-toothed in lateral view. It has high, brittle valves with a notch in the center. Each valve consists of 8 to 10 strong ribs, crossed by fine growth marks. This chiton has a leathery and wide girdle which is covered with fine and elongate spicules.

== Distribution and habitat ==
Nuttallochiton mirandus is a common circumpolar chiton which is endemic to Antarctica's cold waters. It can be found from only 30 metres (100 ft) deep to the depth of 1,400 metres (4,590 ft) and mostly thrives on hard bottoms.

== Feeding ==
Nuttallochiton mirandus is a grazer which mainly feeds on Bryozoans and foraminifera. It uses its radula to swallow big pieces of bryozoan colonies.

== Reproduction ==
To reproduce, both males and females of this species bend the posterior part of their body and release eggs and milt respectively in the water column.
