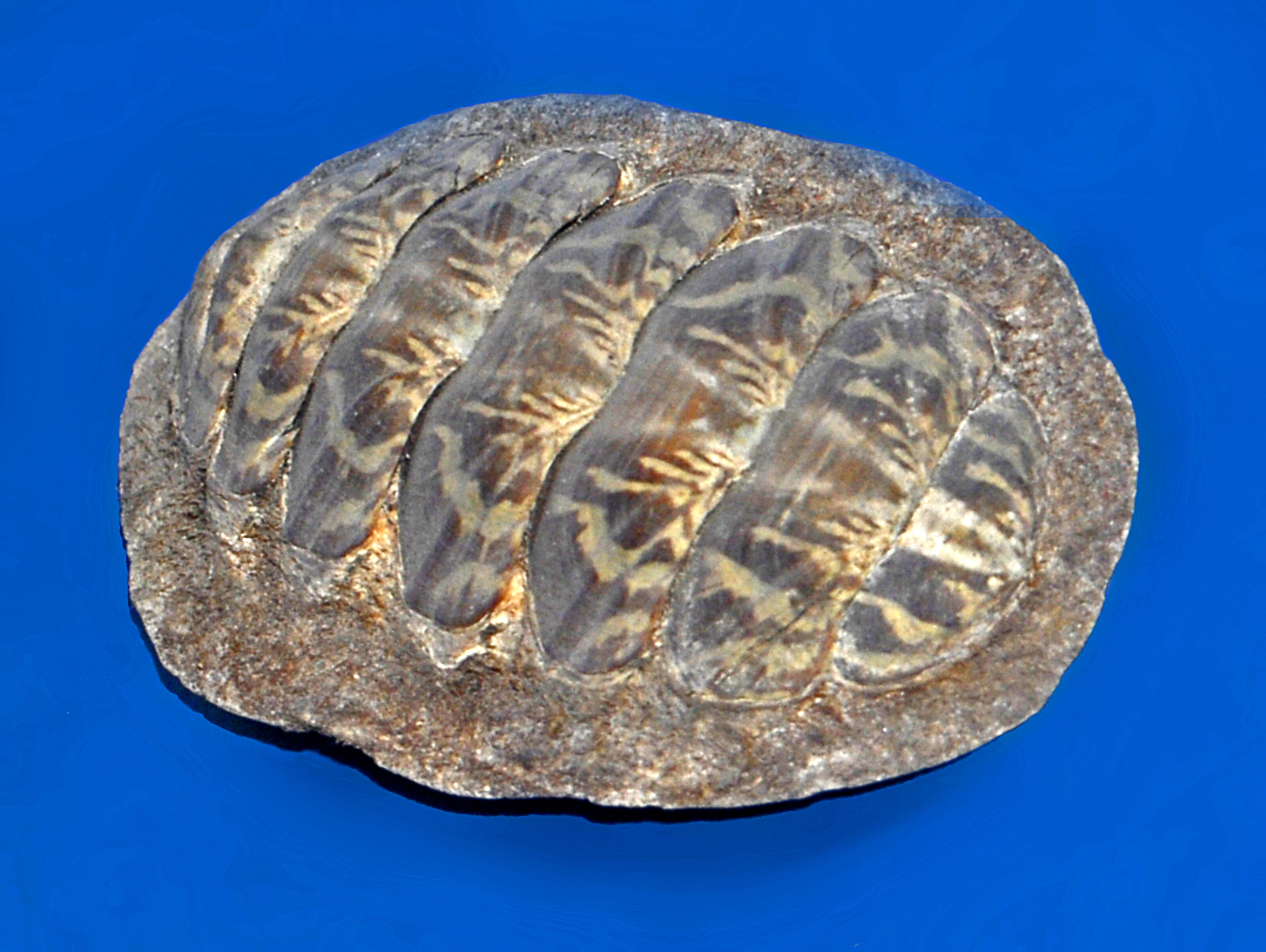
- Dorsal surface of specimen from Tasmania on display at the Museo Civico di Storia Naturale di Milano.

Scientific classification
- Kingdom: Animalia
- Phylum: Mollusca
- Class: Polyplacophora
- Order: Chitonida
- Family: Mopaliidae
- Genus: Plaxiphora
- Species: P. albida

Binomial name
- Plaxiphora albida (Blainville, 1825)

Synonyms
- List: Chaetopleura conspersa H. Adams & Angas, 1864; Chiton albidus Blainville, 1825; Chiton costatus Blainville, 1825; Chiton glaucus Quoy & Gaimard, 1835; Chiton petholatus G. B. Sowerby II, 1839; Chiton porphyrius G. B. Sowerby II, 1839; Chiton tasmanicus Paetel, 1887; Euplaxiphora modesta Haddon, 1886; Plaxiphora bednalli Thiele, 1909; Plaxiphora excurvata Pilsbry, 1893; Plaxiphora paeteliana Thiele, 1909; Plaxiphora petholata (G. B. Sowerby II, 1840); Plaxiphora tasmanica Thiele, 1909; Poneroplax mawlei Iredale & Hull, 1926

= Plaxiphora albida =

Species of mollusc

Plaxiphora albida, the white Plaxiphora chiton, is a species of chiton in the family Mopaliidae.

== Description ==
The white Plaxiphora chiton reaches a common size of about 95mm, with a minimum and maximum length of 40–100 millimetres (1.6–3.9 in) and a width of 25–38 millimetres (0.98–1.50 in). The shell of this large chiton is dark green to brown, humped and oval shaped, with eight rough valves. Its girdle is leathery, brown with darker bars and with long bristles.

== Species discovery ==
This species of Plaxiphora chiton was discovered by Dr. Charles Boyden on wave-exposed rocky shores of New Zealand. It was distinguishable enough from other chitons that it was described as a new species. These chitons do not have bristle-tufts on their girdle, and are low shore chiton. They are also the largest giant chiton species found on Australia's coasts.

== Teeth ==
Plaxiphora albida has radular, bulbous teeth. Their teeth are iron-biomineralized, allowing them to more readily feed on algae attached to hard substrates like rock. Chitons not only feed on algae, but they are able to feed on sponges, corals or tunicates. These molluscs have 17 teeth per row with one pair of those teeth being iron mineralized. Biomineralization strengthens the teeth and prevents mechanical wear, it makes the teeth harder. The tooth size of Plaxiphora albida is similar to that of the chiton species Acanthopleura hirtosa. In a study on mechanical tooth wear in chitons and limpets, P. albida teeth were observed to have had wear, and had more rounded teeth that were stub like. There were also small amounts of silica, presumed to be SiO_{2} in the teeth, but is not thought to contribute a major role to the structure of their teeth.

== Distribution and habitat ==
This species of low-shore chitons is native to south-western Australia, including Queensland, New South Wales, Victoria and Tasmania.

== Population ecology ==
Plaxiphora albida and Onithochiton quercinus are endemic to Southeast Australia, where they are the most abundant chitons. Both chitons grow to about 80 mm in length and are usually found around the surface of rocky shores that are exposed. The specific community is a low-shore algal type which is most abundant with the species Pyura stolonifera. The sex ratio of the chiton is consistently 1:1 for males and females.

== Growth ==
The growth of Plaxiphora albida is estimated to be around ~1 mm per season depending on the age of the chiton. This leads to the estimate of chiton growth being around ~5 mm every year

Recruits of Plaxiphora albida range from 1-2 inches in width. Peak population of recruitment for the chiton is late autumn (May). Recruits have been observed to be. in multiple sites within the community. Reproductive maturity for Plaxiphora albida is roughly 2 years after birth. 50% maximum body size for the chiton is reached after only 3 to 4 years. P. albida is estimated to have a lifespan of around 6 years. While the major cause of mortality is unknown, the best conclusion would be a mixture of predation of other organisms such as starfish and seabirds, desiccation, and tidal action

== Reproductive cycle ==
The gonodosomatic index of Plaxiphora albida showed fluctuations throughout the year. Smaller gonads are characteristic of immature gametes and a lower gonadosomastic index. Contrarily, larger gonads show more mature gametes and exhibit a bigger gonadosomatic index. Gonads in Plaxiphora albida are around 6–7mm. This number rises to 9–10mm when there are mature eggs and sperm present. For the Plaxiphora albida, January was the month which showed the most mature gametes and an increased size of the gonads. The gonads showed a dip in the index size during late summer and early autumn. By April, the gonads of the chiton are reduced immensely in size, staying this size for the remainder of the year.

== Threats ==
As rocky intertidal organisms, Chitons directly face threats caused by ecological shifts: temperature, tidal action, and pH. The organism's resistance to the physiological changes due to the negative impacts is largely determined by its valves. The valves determine the integrity of the shells, of which when at their threshold, could fracture and compromise the defense structure of the organism. While the fractures on the valves can be caused by a multitude of factors, there is a positive correlation between the thickness of the valves and force required to fracture.

Although Chitons face variety of threats from the marine ecosystem, their ability to be abundant for the last 500 million years, suggest that their resistance to ecological pressure is robust. Scientists have accredited the agile movements of Chitons up and down the rocky niche to have partaken in their longing survival.
