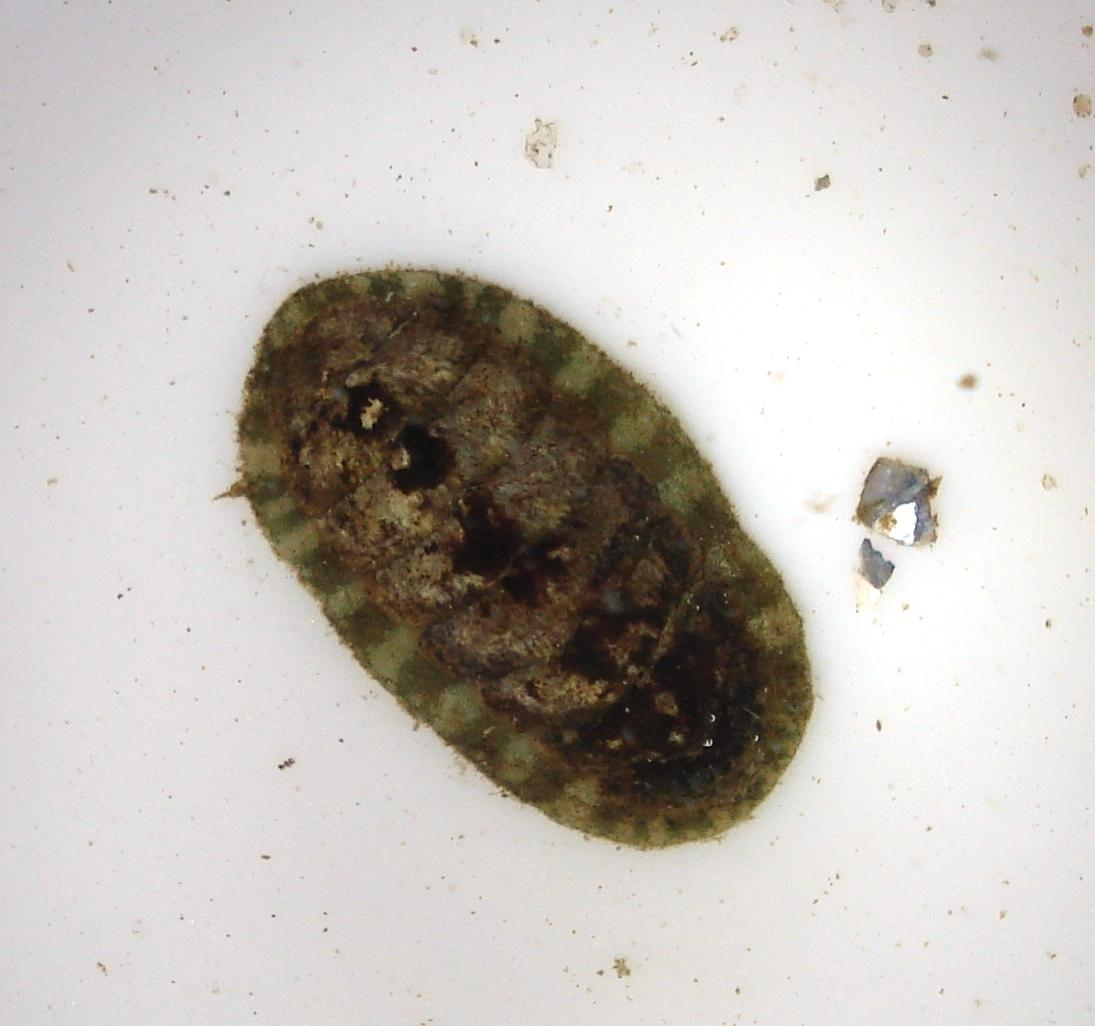
- Lepidochitona cinerea

Scientific classification
- Domain: Eukaryota
- Kingdom: Animalia
- Phylum: Mollusca
- Class: Polyplacophora
- Subclass: Neoloricata
- Order: Chitonida
- Family: Tonicellidae
- Genus: Lepidochitona; Gray, 1821

Type species
- Chiton marginatus Pennant, 1777

Species
- See text

Synonyms
- Beanella Dall, 1882; Craspedochilus G.O. Sars, 1878; Ischnochiton (Trachydermon) Carpenter, 1864; Lepidochiton Gray, 1821 (incorrect subsequent spelling); Lepidochitona (Lepidochitona) Gray, 1821 · alternate representation; Lepidochitona (Middendorffia) Carpenter in Dall, 1882; Lepidochitona (Spongioradsia) Pilsbry, 1894 · alternate representation; Middendorffia Carpenter, 1882; Trachydermon Carpenter, 1864; Trachydermon (Craspedochilus) G. O. Sars, 1878 · alternate representation; Trachydermon (Trachyradsia) Carpenter, 1878 · alternate representation

= Lepidochitona =

Genus of molluscs

Lepidochitona is a genus of chitons. It has been included in the families Tonicellidae, Ischnochitonidae, and Lepidochitonidae.

L. raymondi is the only hermaphroditic polyplacophoran.

There are many fossil species in the genus, as well as species extant today.

Species include:

- Lepidochitona aleutica
- Lepidochitona bullocki
- Lepidochitona caboverdensis
- Lepidochitona canariensis
- Lepidochitona caprearum
- † Lepidochitona chalossensis Dell'Angelo, Lesport, Cluzaud & Sosso, 2020
- Lepidochitona cinerea
- Lepidochitona dicksae
- Lepidochitona furtiva
- Lepidochitona iberica
- Lepidochitona kaasi
- Lepidochitona liozonis
- Lepidochitona monterosatoi
- Lepidochitona piceola
- Lepidochitona rolani
- Lepidochitona rosea
- Lepidochitona rufoi
- Lepidochitona salvadorensis
- Lepidochitona severianoi
- Lepidochitona simrothi
- Lepidochitona stroemfelti
- Lepidochitona subaleutica
- Lepidochitona turtoni
