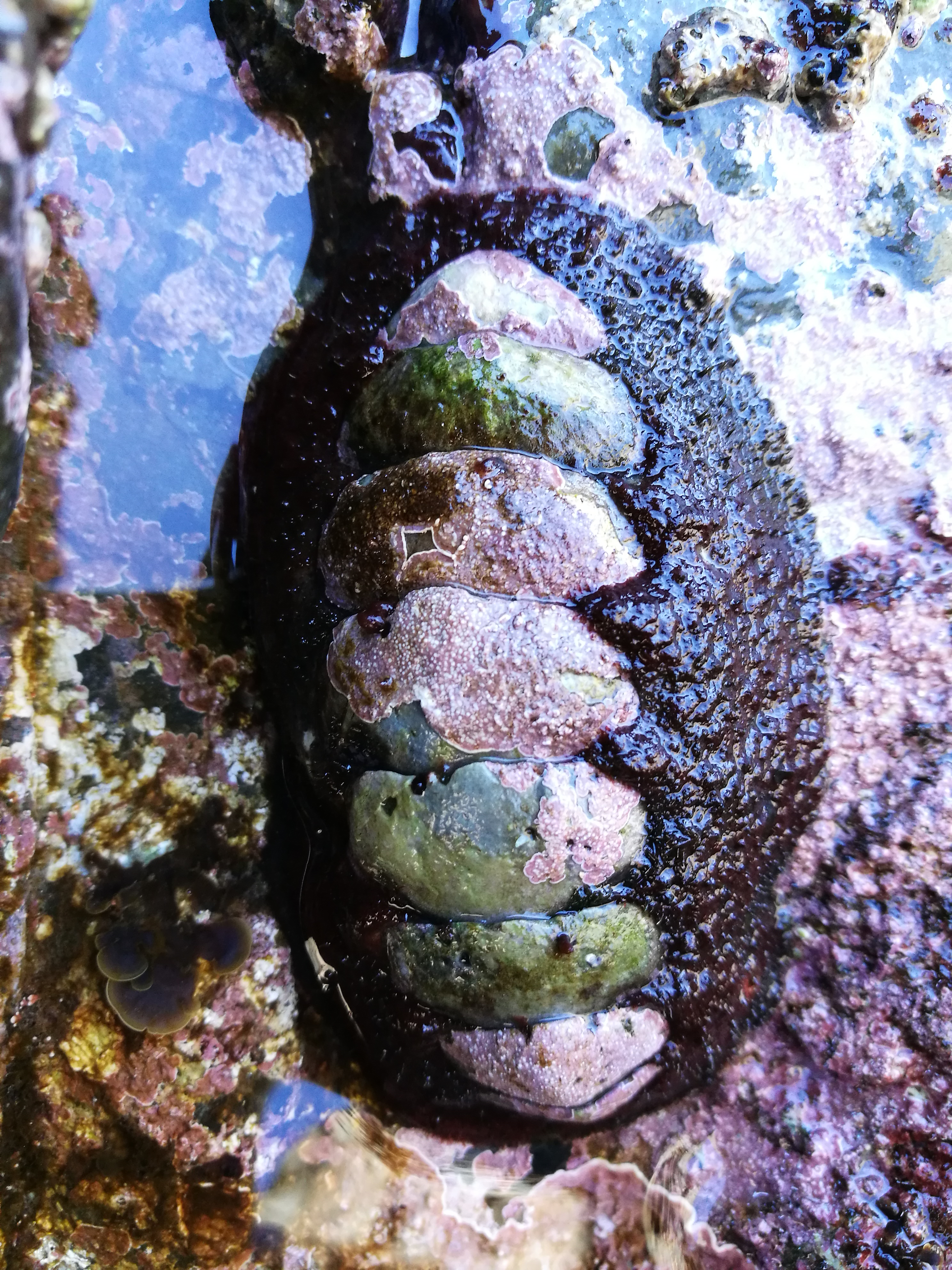

Scientific classification
- Domain: Eukaryota
- Kingdom: Animalia
- Phylum: Mollusca
- Class: Polyplacophora
- Order: Chitonida
- Family: Mopaliidae
- Genus: Plaxiphora
- Species: P. obtecta

Binomial name
- Plaxiphora obtecta Carpenter in Pilsbry, 1893

Synonyms
- Guildingia obtecta Iredale & Hull 1932; Morton & Miller 1968, 1973; Walsby & Morton 1982

= Plaxiphora obtecta =

Species of mollusc

Plaxiphora obtecta is a large chiton in the family Mopaliidae, endemic to New Zealand, where it is most often found on the West Coast of the North Island. It is called Haka-hiwihiwi by some Māori and was likely a food source.

== Description and habitat ==
Up to 90 millimetres (3.5 in) long and 65 millimetres (2.6 in) wide, making it one of the largest chitons found in New Zealand. It has a broad dark brown girdle dotted with small short bristles, and reduced dark green valves, sometimes with a paler stripe down the centre. It is frequent around the holdfasts of algae and in rock crevices around the low intertidal zone, usually on exposed coasts.
