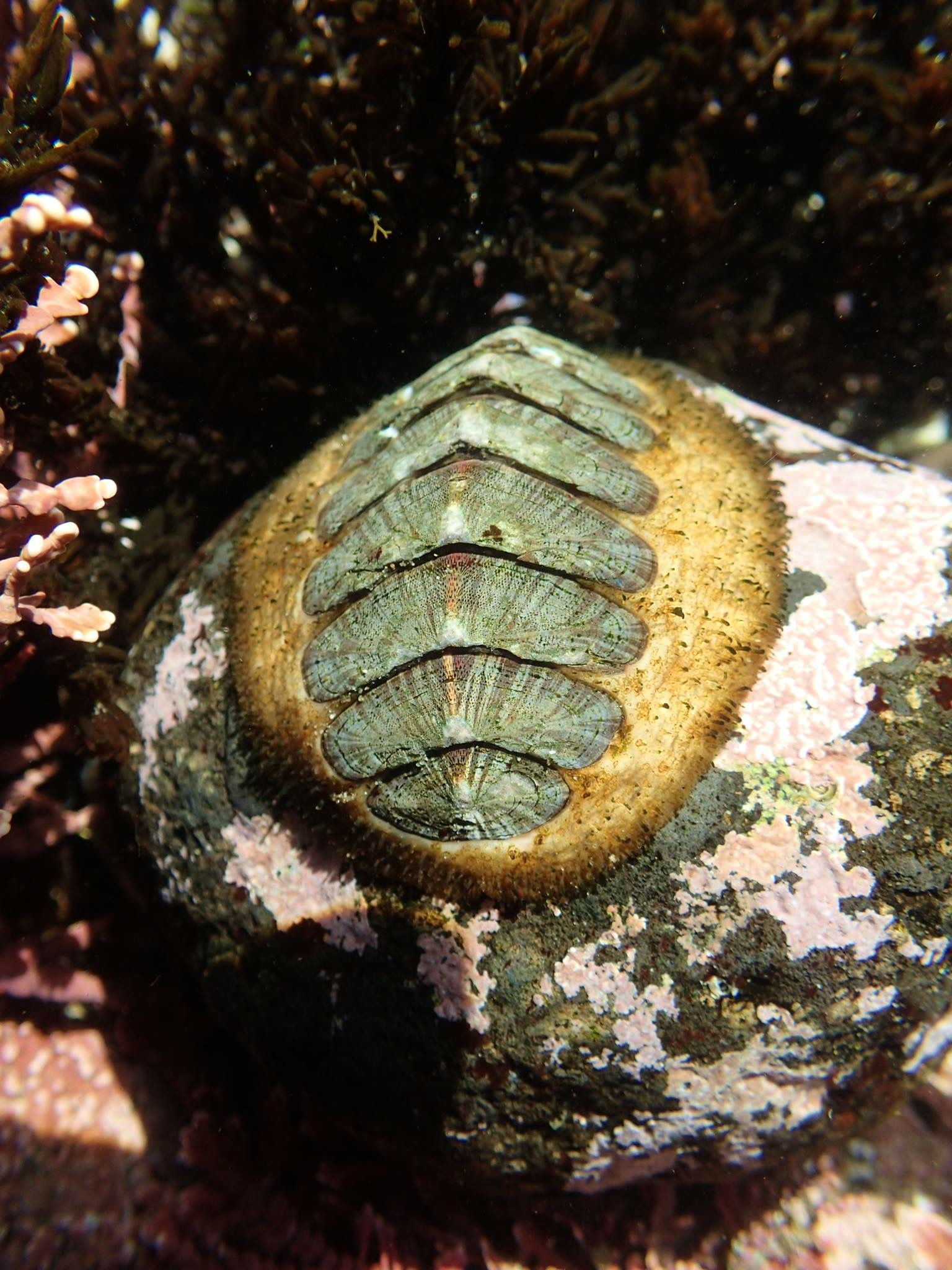

Scientific classification
- Kingdom: Animalia
- Phylum: Mollusca
- Class: Polyplacophora
- Order: Chitonida
- Family: Mopaliidae
- Genus: Mopalia
- Species: M. lignosa

Binomial name
- Mopalia lignosa (Gould, 1846)

Synonyms
- Chiton eschscholtzii Middendorff, 1847; Chiton lignosus, Gould, 1846; Chiton merckii, Middendorff, 1847; Chiton montereyensis, Carpenter, 1855; Chiton simpsonii, Gray, 1847; Mopalia insignis, Pilsbry, 1843; Mopalia muscosa f. elevata Pilsbry, 1893; Mopalia muscosa subsp. lignosa (Gould, 1846)

= Mopalia lignosa =

Species of chiton

Mopalia lignosa, the woody chiton, is a medium to large-sized species of polyplacophoran mollusc in the family Mopaliidae. This species was first described in 1846 by the conchologist Augustus Addison Gould and can be found on the west coast of the United States, Mexico and Canada.

== Description ==
The woody chiton is medium to large in size, measuring between 37 and 76 mm long. It has a brown or greenish shell, which contains prominent lines in light brown or pale green. The structure of the valves consists of a strong V-shape ridge and fine radial lines. Depending on the shell, the lines can be irregular and the valves can also be mottled. This chiton has also a thick, leathery girdle, which is brown and has short hairs.

== Distribution and habitat ==
The woody chiton is commonly found on rocky shores of the Eastern Pacific. Its range spans from the Alaska, to the Mexican state of Baja California. This chiton can be found in the intertidal zone and mostly lives on the bottoms or sides of large boulders on open coasts.

== Feeding ==
This chiton is a nocturnal grazer which feeds on sea lettuce, diatoms as well as foraminifera. To do so, the woody chiton has radular teeth with magnetite to reduce tooth wear.

== Life cycle ==
The eggs hatch into planktonic trocophore larvae, which means they form part of the meroplankton. Eventually they will metamorphose and settle on the bottom as young adults.
