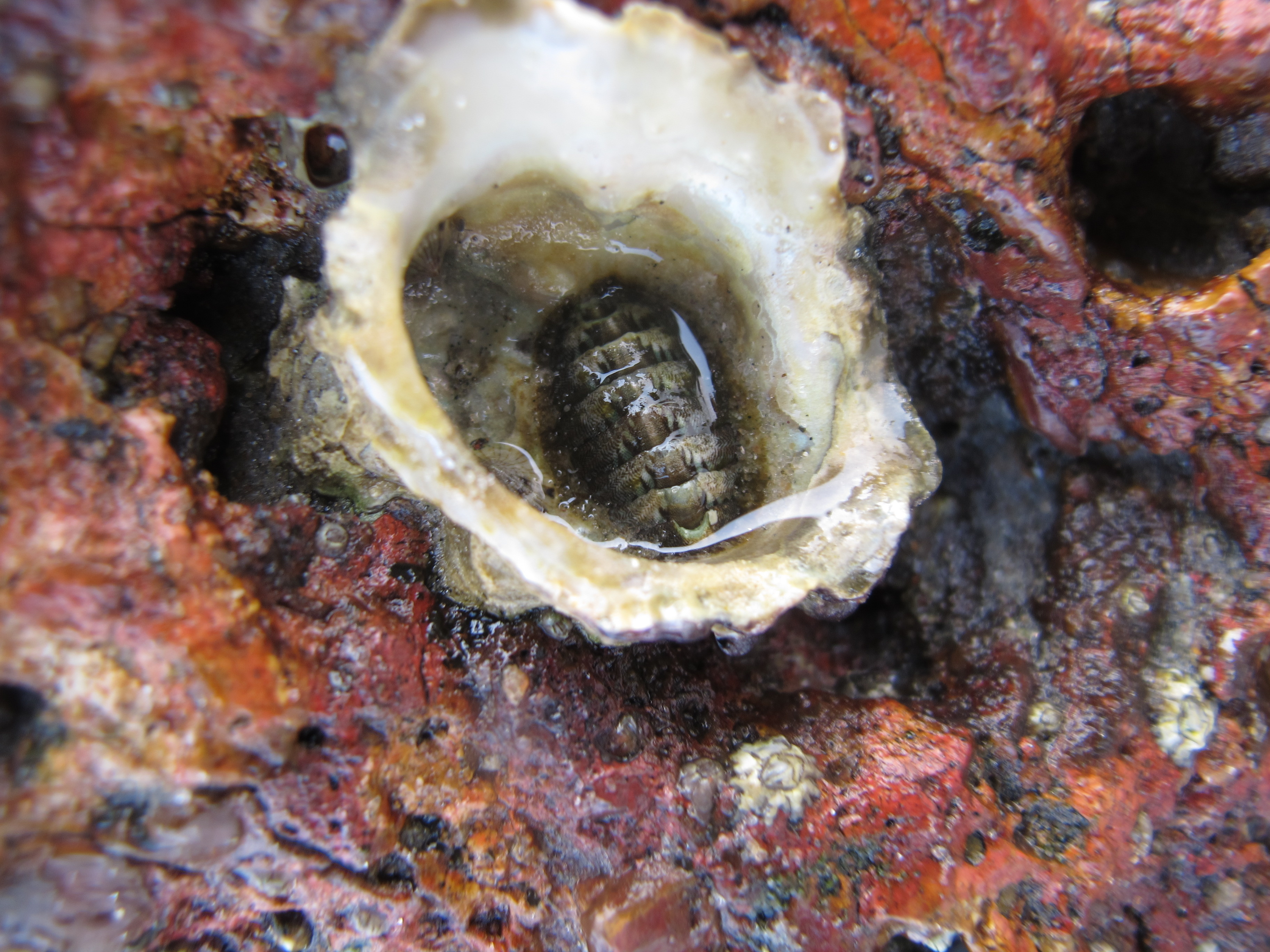
- Plaxiphora albida in situ, in south Kerala

Scientific classification
- Domain: Eukaryota
- Kingdom: Animalia
- Phylum: Mollusca
- Class: Polyplacophora
- Order: Chitonida
- Family: Mopaliidae
- Genus: Plaxiphora
- Species: P. tricolor

Binomial name
- Plaxiphora tricolor Thiele, 1909

= Plaxiphora tricolor =

Species of mollusc

Plaxiphora tricolor is a species of chiton in the family Mopaliidae.

== Distribution ==
This species was first described by Thiele in 1909 from Sri Lanka. The same species has been collected in southern Kerala, India in 2013. This species is commonly found intertidally.

== Description ==
The animal is small, 1 to 1.5 cm in length and 0.5 to 1 cm in width, oval, rather flat, black rounded, valves little or not beaked. The first valve is sculptured with distinct 8 radiating ribs and two indistinct radiating ribs. The girdle is very narrow and has bristles, not spines. The tegmentum is variously blotched and streaked with brown, green and white. The tegmentum is smooth and glossy to the naked eye, very finely granulose.

The girdle is whitish, banded with brown, dorsally densely covered with very small, elongate oval, calcareous corpuscules, interspersed with long, slender hairs, bearing a blunt topped, smooth, calcareous needle. The radula extends back from the mouth to approximately one third of the animal's length. The radula is polystichous, since there are many different teeth in each row, and there are 43 rows of teeth. Plaxiphora tricolor has different colour morphs. The gill arrangement is abanal and holobranchial.
