= Plaxiphora egregia =

Scientific classification
- Domain: Eukaryota
- Kingdom: Animalia
- Phylum: Mollusca
- Class: Polyplacophora
- Order: Chitonida
- Family: Mopaliidae
- Genus: Plaxiphora
- Species: P. egregia

Binomial name
- Plaxiphora egregia (H. Adams, 1866)

Synonyms
- Frembleya egregia H. Adams, 1866; Iredale & Hull, 1932; Dell, 1951; Powell, 1979; Plaxiphora ovata Suter, 1913

Species of mollusc

Plaxiphora egregia is a distinctive chiton in the family Mopaliidae, endemic to the South Island of New Zealand, where it is uncommon.

== Description and habitat ==
Small flat chiton, 15-25mm in length, usually oval with some individuals almost round. Crests of the valves are smooth with radial ribs and granular grooves running down to the edges, the whole usually light greenish with darker blotches. The yellowish brown girdle is relatively wide and is covered in spicules. There are tufts of white bristles along the inner girdle at the base of each valve suture and at the head, with shorter bristles surrounding the margin poking outwards. P. egregia hollows out a cavity in bull kelp holdfasts, usually on exposed rocky coasts, from low intertidal to shallow subtidal zones. Found from Cook Strait south to Stewart Island.
