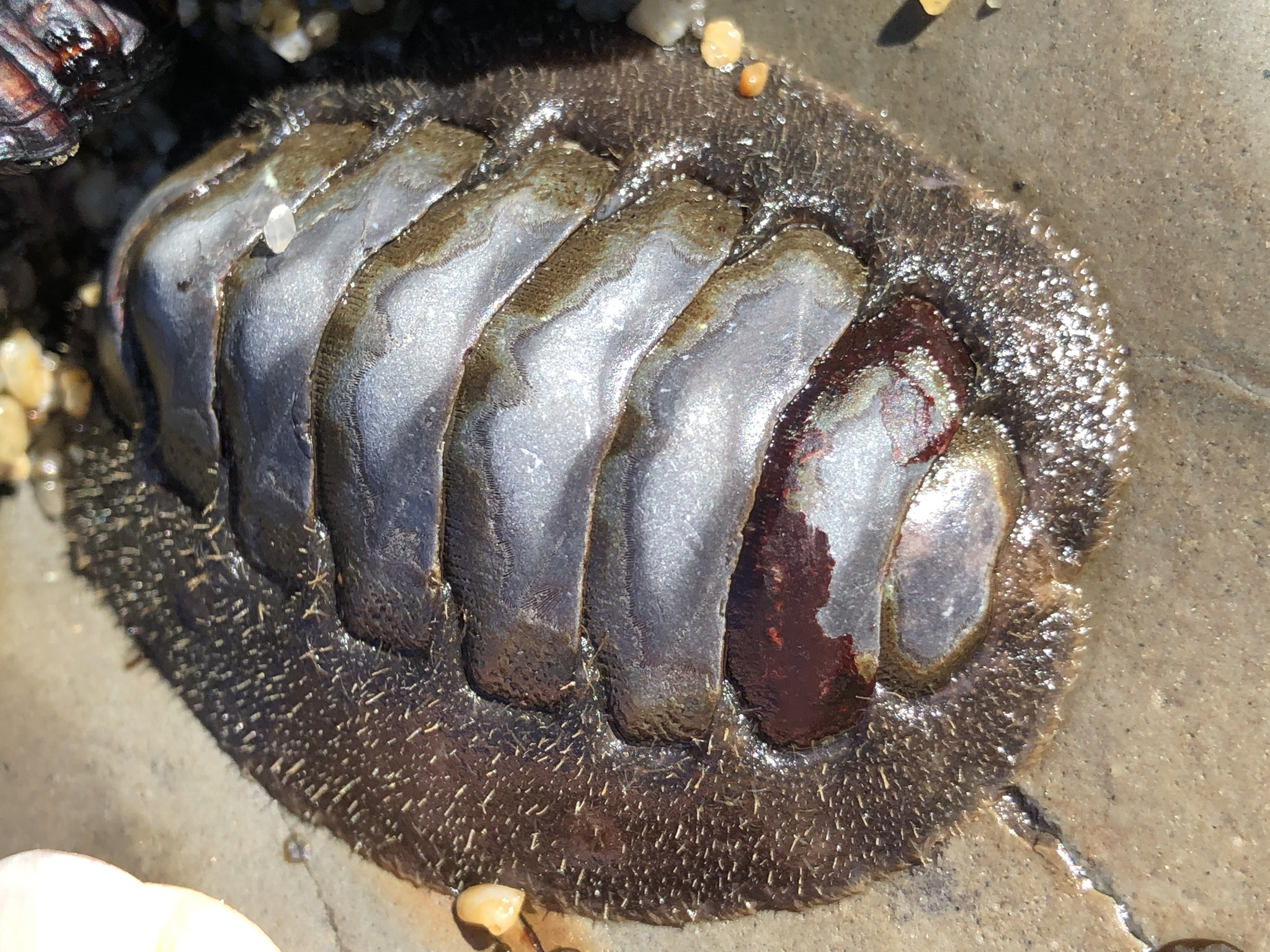

Scientific classification
- Domain: Eukaryota
- Kingdom: Animalia
- Phylum: Mollusca
- Class: Polyplacophora
- Order: Chitonida
- Family: Mopaliidae
- Genus: Mopalia
- Species: M. hindsii

Binomial name
- Mopalia hindsii Sowerby in Reeve, 1847

= Mopalia hindsii =

Hind's mopalia

Species of mollusc

Mopalia hindsii is a species of medium-sized chiton that grows up to 7 cm long. Most commonly found in intertidal zones, M. hindsii has a white ventral side unlike most intertidal chitons that are orange underneath.

== Range ==
Mopalia hindsii has been observed living from South California north to Alaska.

== Habitat ==
Mopalia hindsii are most common in protected environments like shallow bays, underneath rocks and on shaded pilings.

== Diet ==
While most chitons are herbivores, M. hindsii will graze on just about anything in its path that doesn’t escape including polychaetes, amphipods, barnacles, sponges and algae. This uncommon lifestyle most likely explains why M. hindsii are able to survive in areas too silty for other chitons.
