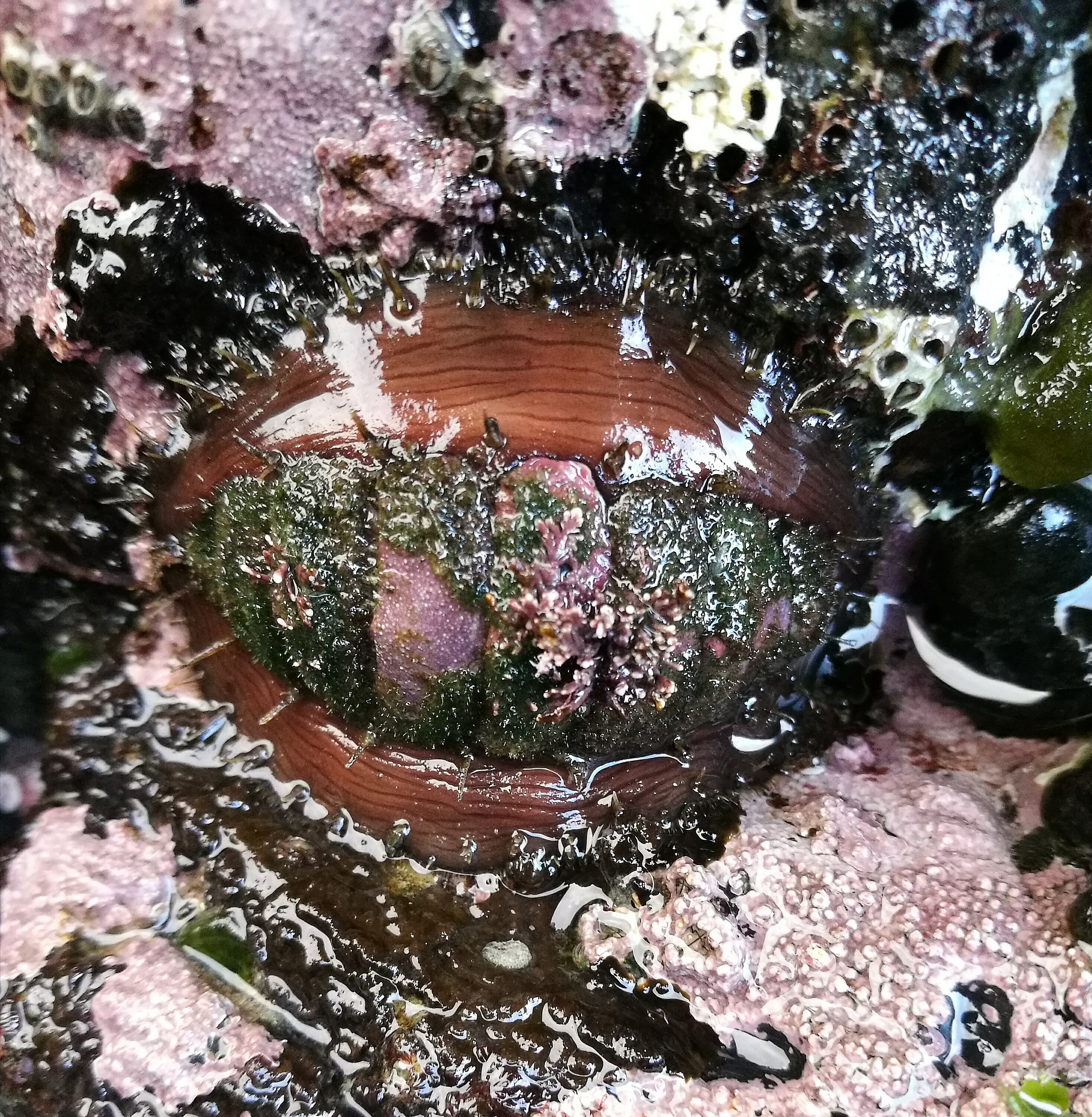

Scientific classification
- Domain: Eukaryota
- Kingdom: Animalia
- Phylum: Mollusca
- Class: Polyplacophora
- Order: Chitonida
- Family: Mopaliidae
- Genus: Plaxiphora
- Species: P. biramosa

Binomial name
- Plaxiphora biramosa (Quoy & Gaimard, 1835)

Synonyms
- Chiton biramosus Quoy & Gaimard, 1835; Diaphoroplax biramosus Iredale & Hull, 1932; Dell, 1951; Powell, 1979

= Plaxiphora biramosa =

Species of mollusc

Plaxiphora biramosa is an uncommon chiton in the family Mopaliidae, endemic to New Zealand.

== Description and habitat ==
P. biramosa is a medium-sized chiton, oval and very flat, with the head and tail valves much reduced in size. Wavy grooves run lengthwise along the central areas of the valves, which can be cream through yellow to light olive-green. These are often coated in pink coralline algae and other small growths, much like the rocks the animal lives around, giving it a cryptic disguise. The girdle is wide, usually a reddish brown, and distinguished by many fine bristles along the margin and larger tufts of bristles at the sutures. The usual length is from 45-62mm, making it one of the larger chitons found in New Zealand. Although an extremely slow moving species, P. biramosa exhibits homing behaviour after moving around at night. It inhabits crevices in smooth rocks on wave-exposed coasts around New Zealand, although it is not known from the warmer north-eastern areas of the North Island.
