= Plaxiphora australis =

Scientific classification
- Kingdom: Animalia
- Phylum: Mollusca
- Class: Polyplacophora
- Order: Chitonida
- Family: Mopaliidae
- Genus: Plaxiphora
- Species: P. australis

Binomial name
- Plaxiphora australis (Suter, 1907)

Synonyms
- Mopalia australis Suter, 1907; Plaxiphora (Plaxiphora) australis (Suter, 1907)

Species of mollusc

Plaxiphora australis is a very small species of chiton marine molluscs in the family Mopaliidae.

== Distribution ==
New Zealand
