= Maorichiton =

Scientific classification
- Kingdom: Animalia
- Phylum: Mollusca
- Class: Polyplacophora
- Order: Chitonida
- Family: Mopaliidae
- Genus: Maorichiton; Iredale, 1914

Species
- See text.

Genus of molluscs

Maorichiton is a defunct genus of chitons in the family Mopaliidae.

== Species ==
Species within this genus included:

- Maorichiton caelatus (Reeve, 1847)
- Maorichiton schauinslandi (Thiele, 1909)

These two species are now recognized as a single species Plaxiphora caelata (Reeve, 1847)
