= Spongioradsia =

Spongioradsia Temporal range: Oligocene

Scientific classification
- Kingdom: Animalia
- Phylum: Mollusca
- Class: Polyplacophora
- Subclass: Neoloricata
- Order: Chitonida
- Family: Tonicellidae
- Genus: Spongioradsia; Pilsbry, 1894

Type species
- Trachydermon (Trachyradsia) aleutica Dall, 1878

Synonyms
- Trachydermon (Spongioradsia) Pilsbry, 1894 (original rank)

Extinct genus of molluscs

Spongioradsia is a genus of polyplacophoran molluscs. Spongioradsia became extinct during the Oligocene period.

== Species ==
- Spongioradsia aleutica (Dall, 1878)

Synonyms

- Spongioradsia foveolata Is. Taki, 1938: synonym of Callochiton foveolatus (Is. Taki, 1938) (original combination)
- Spongioradsia subaleutica Sirenko, 1976: synonym of Lepidochitona (Lepidochitona) subaleutica (Sirenko, 1976) (original combination)
