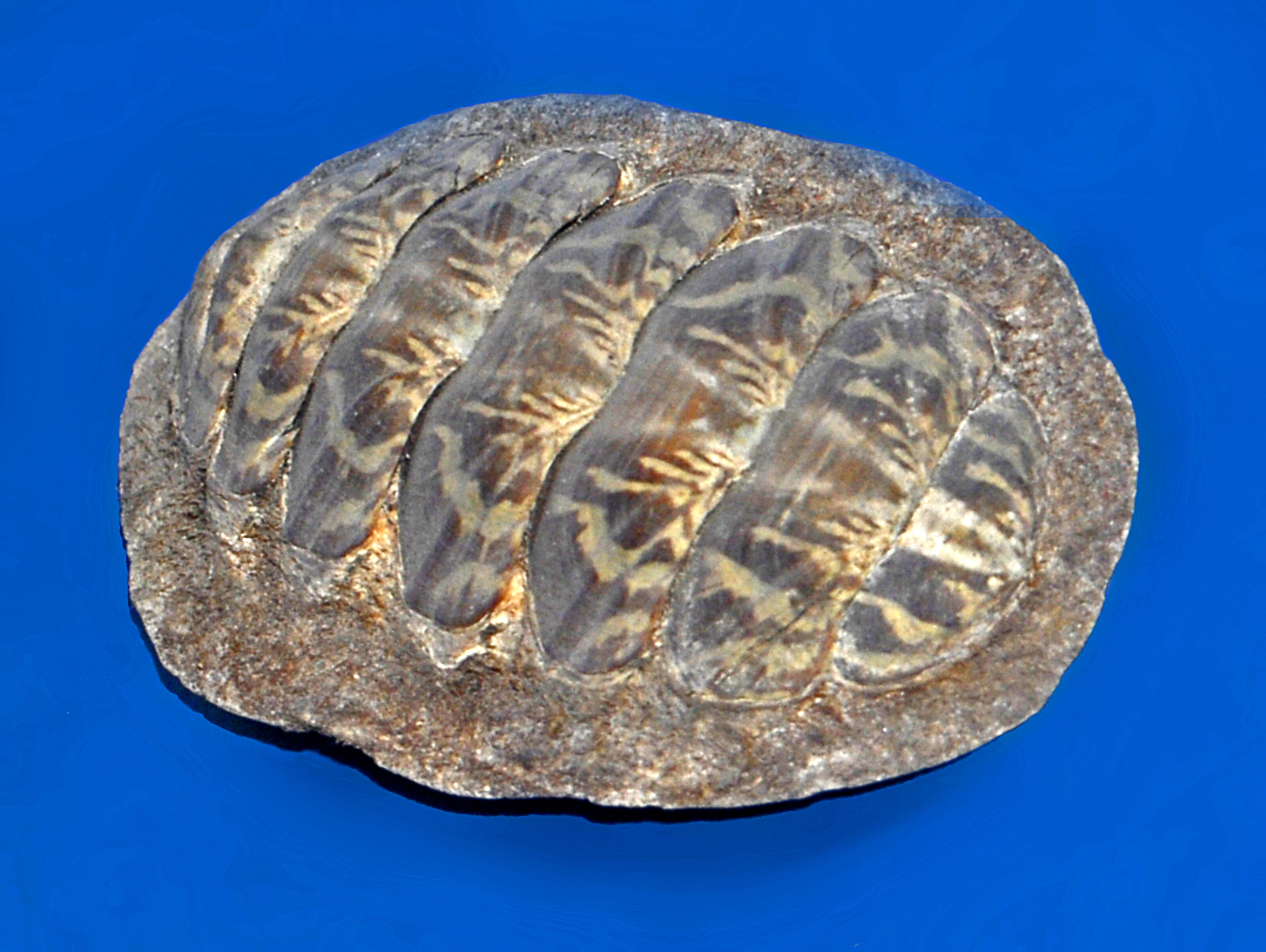
- Dorsal surface of Plaxiphora albida from Tasmania on display at the Museo Civico di Storia Naturale di Milano.

Scientific classification
- Kingdom: Animalia
- Phylum: Mollusca
- Class: Polyplacophora
- Order: Chitonida
- Family: Mopaliidae
- Subfamily: Mopaliinae
- Genus: Plaxiphora; Gray, 1847

Species
- 22 species (see text)

Synonyms
- Aerilamma Hull, 1924; Chiton (Plaxiphora) J. E. Gray, 1847; Diaphoroplax Iredale, 1914; Euplaxiphora Shuttleworth, 1853; Frembleya H. Adams, 1867; Guildingia P. P. Carpenter, 1882; Hachijomopalia Is. Taki, 1954; Kopionella Ashby, 1919; Maorichiton Iredale, 1914; Mopalia (Semimopalia) Dall, 1919; Plaxiphora (Diaphoroplax) Iredale, 1914; Plaxiphora (Euplaxiphora) Shuttleworth, 1853; Plaxiphora (Frembleya) H. Adams, 1867; Plaxiphora (Guildingia) P. P. Carpenter, 1882; Plaxiphora (Maorichiton) Iredale, 1914; Plaxiphora (Mercatora) Leloup, 1942; Plaxiphora (Plaxiphora) J. E. Gray, 1847; Plaxiphora (Poneroplax) Iredale, 1914; Poneroplax Iredale, 1914; Streptochiton Dall, 1879; Vaferichiton Iredale & Hull, 1932

= Plaxiphora =

Genus of molluscs

Plaxiphora is a genus of chitons in the family Mopaliidae. It is distributed in the Atlantic, Indian, and Pacific Oceans, primarily in the south-temperate and subantarctic regions.

== Species ==
There are 22 species:

- Plaxiphora albida (Blainville, 1825)
- Plaxiphora aurata (Spalowsky, 1795)
- Plaxiphora australis (Suter, 1907)
- Plaxiphora biramosa (Quoy & Gaimard, 1835)
- Plaxiphora boydeni R. C. Murdoch, 1982
- Plaxiphora bucklandnicksi Sirenko, 2012
- Plaxiphora caelata (Reeve, 1847)
- Plaxiphora egregia (H. Adams, 1867)
- Plaxiphora fernandezi Thiele, 1909
- Plaxiphora gwenae A. J. Ferreira, 1987
- Plaxiphora indica Thiele, 1909
- Plaxiphora integra (Is. Taki, 1954)
- Plaxiphora javanica Kaas & Van Belle, 1994
- Plaxiphora kamehamehae A. J. Ferreira & Bertsch, 1979
- Plaxiphora matthewsi Iredale, 1910
- Plaxiphora mercatoris Leloup, 1936
- Plaxiphora murdochi Suter, 1905
- Plaxiphora obscurella (Souverbie, 1866)
- Plaxiphora obtecta Carpenter, 1893
- Plaxiphora parva Nierstrasz, 1906
- Plaxiphora tricolor Thiele, 1909
- Plaxiphora tulearensis Leloup, 1981

=== Extinct species ===
In 2024, Sirenko and Dell'Angelo described the first extinct species of the genus, Plaxiphorma luzanovskae, discovered through fossils from the Paleocene of Ukraine.
