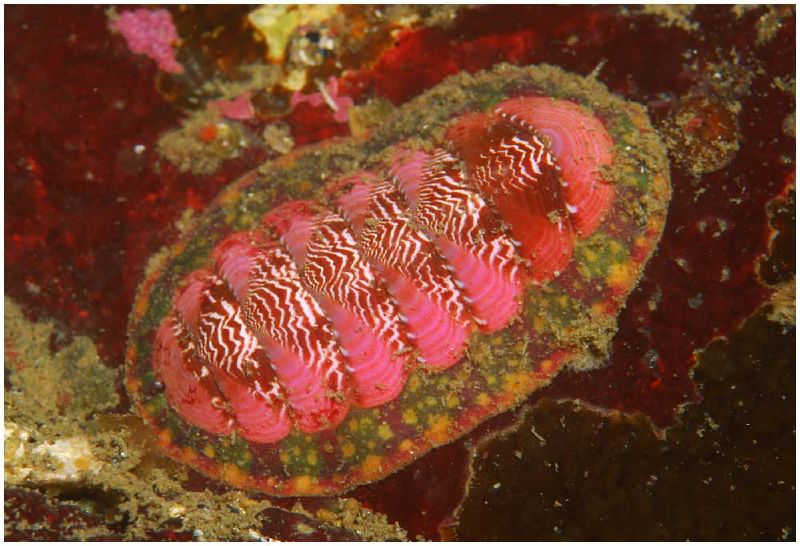

Scientific classification
- Kingdom: Animalia
- Phylum: Mollusca
- Class: Polyplacophora
- Order: Chitonida
- Family: Tonicellidae
- Genus: Tonicella
- Species: T. insignis

Binomial name
- Tonicella insignis Reeve, 1847

Synonyms
- Tonicella submarmorea, Chiton insignis

= Tonicella insignis =

Species of mollusc

Tonicella insignis, the white-lined chiton, or red chiton, also known as the hidden chiton, belongs to the Tonicellidae family in the class Polyplacophora, and the phylum of Mollusca. Its body length of T. insignis is around 5 cm.

== Habitat ==
It can be found in the coastal region of Alaska to Oregon in North America. Similar to other types of chitons, T. insignis also lives on hard rocks in the sub-tidal zone and can be found at depths up to 52 meters under water.

== Characteristic ==
Tonicella insignis have camouflaged eight-valve shells with white wavy lines on all valves. The shell protects them from predators by blending their bodies into the environment. The special white line on T. insignis is one of the most distinguishable characteristics, which can only be found on the second to the seventh valve.

Tonicella insignis mainly eat phytoplankton and algae that float around them or are on rocks. The shell consists of eight valves which gives them flexibility while crawling through uneven rocks and also the ability to curl up like a ball when facing external threats.

== Similar species ==
One closely related species is Tonicella lineata, which has a similar shell color, but instead of white lines on the shell, it has pink or orange lines.

== Reproductive cycle ==
The reproductive cycle of this chiton happens annually. They reproduce between summer and mid-winter demonstrated with an increase in gonads size. Some earlier observations showed that their reproductive period might be affected by the changes of external environment, such as water temperature or the abundance of food supply. The major trigger of T. Insignis's reproductive period was believed to be the water temperature, which is between 7 and 8 °C in spring. However, data from 1971 showed that T. Insignis started their reproductive cycle when the temperature was still 6.3 °C.

Now the common hypothesis relates to the spring bloom, resulting in the increased number of phytoplankton and algae in the water. This hypothesis was later supported by more correlative data. A possible explanation could be that with the increased abundance of food source, T. Insignis may begin to enlarge their gonad size. With further investigation, scientist Himmelman found that instead of the phytoplankton as food source, some unknown substances related to or secreted by the phytoplankton were the key for triggering the start of their reproductive cycle.
