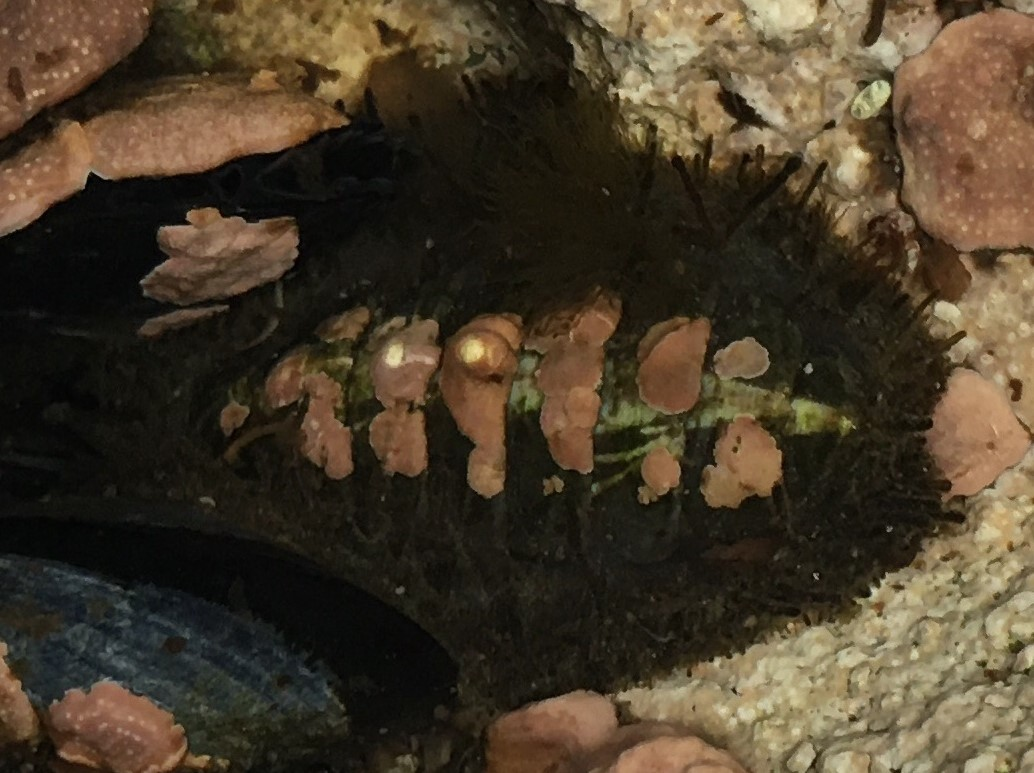

Scientific classification
- Kingdom: Animalia
- Phylum: Mollusca
- Class: Polyplacophora
- Order: Chitonida
- Family: Mopaliidae
- Genus: Plaxiphora
- Species: P. aurata

Binomial name
- Plaxiphora aurata (Spalowsky, 1795)

Synonyms
- List: Chaetopleura ahnni Rochebrune, 1884; Chaetopleura frigida Rochebrune, 1889; Chaetopleura hahni Rochebrune, 1889; Chaetopleura savatieri Rochebrune, 1881; Chaetopleura veneris Rochebrune, 1884 sensu Carcelles, 1950; Chiton auratus Spalowsky, 1795; Chiton aureus [lapsus]; Chiton carmichaelis W. Wood, 1828; Chiton frembleii Broderip, 1832; Chiton raripilosus Blainville, 1825; Chiton setiger P. P. King, 1832; Mopalia (Semimopalia) grisea Dall, 1919; Mopalia grisea Dall, 1919; Plaxiphora (Plaxiphora) aurata (Spalowsky, 1795); Plaxiphora aucklandica Suter, 1909; Plaxiphora campbelli Filhol, 1880; Plaxiphora carpenteri Haddon, 1886; Plaxiphora frigida (Rochebrune, 1889); Plaxiphora setigera (P. P. King, 1832); Plaxiphora simplex P. P. Carpenter in Haddon, 1886; Plaxiphora superba Pilsbry, 1892; Tonicia atrata Hutton, 1880; Tonicia subatrata Pilsbry, 1893

= Plaxiphora aurata =

Subspecies of mollusc

Plaxiphora aurata is a species of chiton in the family Mopaliidae.
