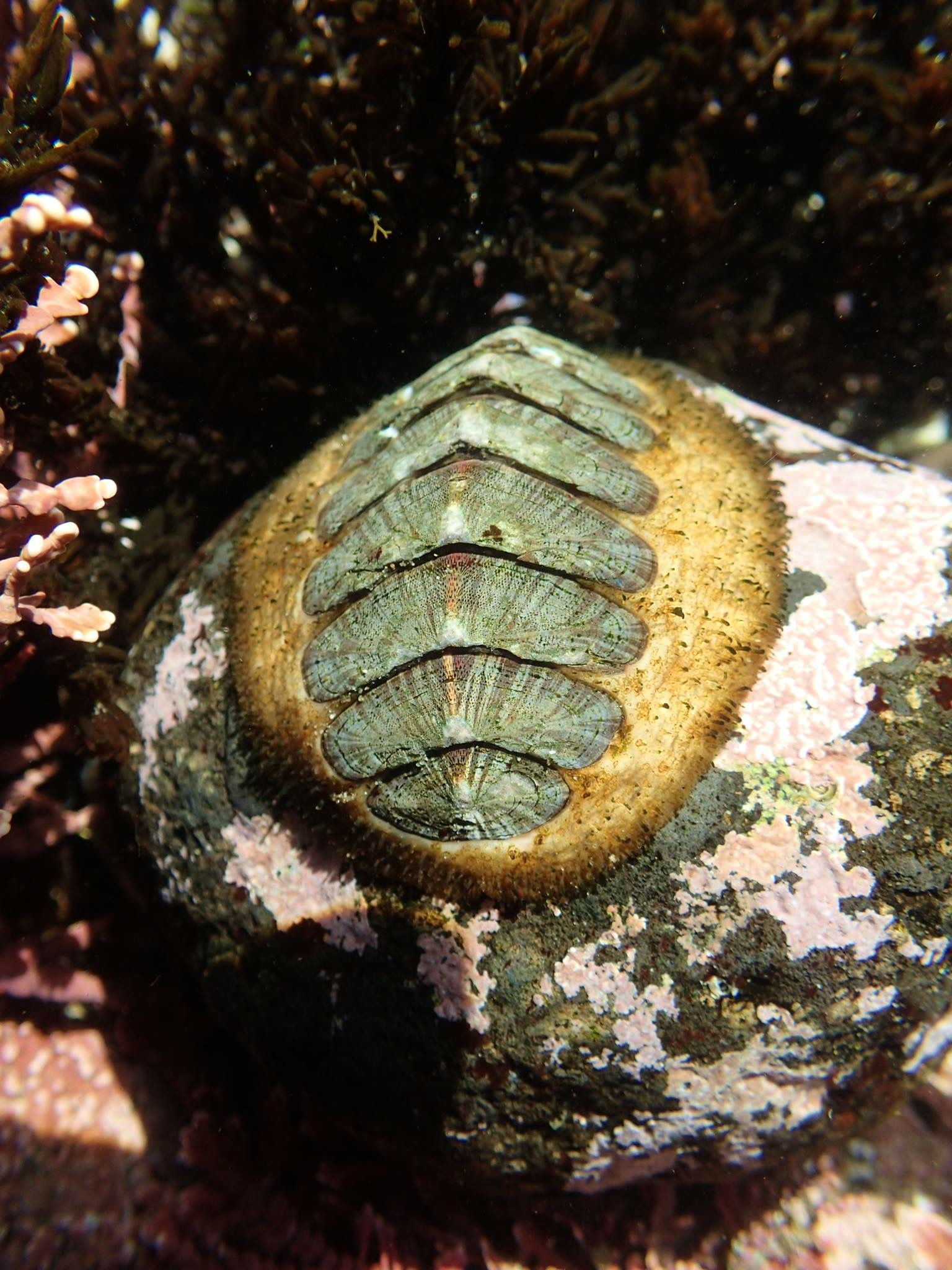
- Mopalia lignosa

Scientific classification
- Domain: Eukaryota
- Kingdom: Animalia
- Phylum: Mollusca
- Class: Polyplacophora
- Order: Chitonida
- Family: Mopaliidae
- Subfamily: Mopaliinae
- Genus: Mopalia; Gray, 1847

= Mopalia =

Genus of molluscs

Mopalia is a genus of chitons in the family Mopaliidae.

== Species ==
Species include:

- Mopalia acuta
- Mopalia ciliata
- Mopalia cirrata
- Mopalia egretta
- Mopalia ferreirai
- Mopalia hindsii
- Mopalia imporcata
- Mopalia laevior
- Mopalia lignosa
- Mopalia lionotus
- Mopalia lowei
- Mopalia muscosa
- Mopalia phorminx
- Mopalia porifera
- Mopalia recurvans
- Mopalia sinuata
- Mopalia spectabilis
- Mopalia swanii
