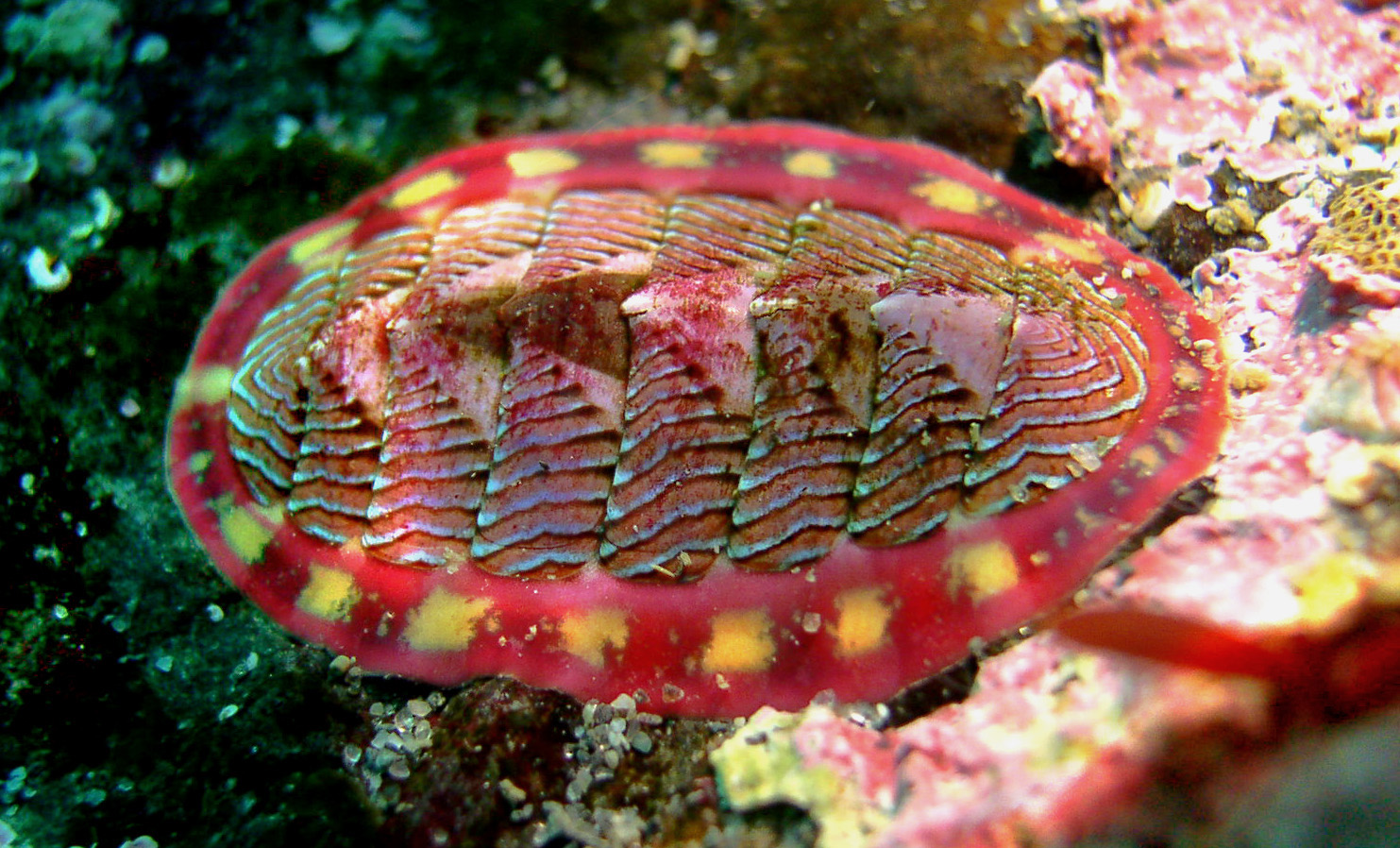

Scientific classification
- Domain: Eukaryota
- Kingdom: Animalia
- Phylum: Mollusca
- Class: Polyplacophora
- Order: Chitonida
- Family: Tonicellidae
- Genus: Tonicella
- Species: T. lineata

Binomial name
- Tonicella lineata Wood, 1815

Synonyms
- Tonicella blaneyi Dall, 1905

= Tonicella lineata =

Species of mollusc

Tonicella lineata, commonly known as the lined chiton, is a species of chiton from the North Pacific.

== Size and description ==
Tonicella lineata is a very colorful chiton, having blue, purple or black straight or zig-zag lines on each of the eight valves. The background color of the valves is often brown or red, but can also be bright blue or yellow to orange. The girdle is hairless and brown to red or pink, often with regular yellow or white patches. This species grows to 5 cm in length.

== Similar species ==
Tonicella lokii is extremely similar but has radiating bands on the girdle. Tonicella undocaerulea is very similar but lacks a dark border to the concentric blue lines on the anterior plate. Mopalia spectabilis looks superficially similar due to its bright blue wavy lines on the valves, but has a hairy girdle. It can also be confused with Tonicella insignis (Reeve, 1847) which retains the zig-zag pattern in concentric rings on the first and eighth valves and also the lines are most often white.

== Distribution and habitat ==
The natural range of T. lineata stretches from the Aleutian Islands of Alaska to San Miguel Island of California, as well as the Sea of Okhotsk of Russia and northern Japan. This species has also been found in Puget Sound, Washington on floats. It has been recorded from intertidal and subtidal waters to a depth of 30 to 90 m (98 to 295 ft).

== Biology ==
Tonicella lineata often occurs on rocks that are encrusted by coralline algae; presumably this is what their coloration is intended to camouflage against. If knocked from its substrate, T. lineata will contract into a ball in order to protect its vulnerable ventral side, similar to many isopods. Coralline algae are also the major food item of T. lineata. On the Oregon coast this species can be found living under purple urchins (Strongylocentrotus purpuratus). This species is preyed upon by the sea stars Pisaster ochraceus and Leptasterias haxactis. Animals out of water only have about 73% the respiration of submerged animals, and likely incur an oxygen debt while out of water that must be repaid once resubmerged. When submerged, gas exchange occurs by water flowing from the anterior portion of the chiton into the mantle cavity where the ctenidia (gills) reside in the pallial grooves. This also takes care of waste produced as the water passes over the anus after the ctenidia and carries away feces.
