= Lucilina =

Lucilina Temporal range: Pliocene

Scientific classification
- Domain: Eukaryota
- Kingdom: Animalia
- Phylum: Mollusca
- Class: Polyplacophora
- Order: Chitonida
- Family: Chitonidae
- Subfamily: Toniciinae
- Genus: Lucilina; Dall 1882

Extinct genus of molluscs

Lucilina is a genus of polyplacophoran molluscs. It includes species known from fossil remains, as well as living species. It is often considered a subgenus of Tonicia.

== Species ==
- Lucilina amanda
- Lucilina carnosa
- Lucilina carpenteri
- Lucilina ceylonica
- Lucilina dilecta
- Lucilina dupuisi
- Lucilina floccata
- Lucilina fortilirata
- Lucilina hulliana
- Lucilina indica
- Lucilina lamellosa
- Lucilina mariae
- Lucilina nigropunctata
- Lucilina novemrugata
- Lucilina pacifica
- Lucilina pectinoides
- Lucilina perligera
- Lucilina polyomma
- Lucilina reticulata
- Lucilina russelli Ladd, 1966
- Lucilina sowerbyi
- Lucilina sueziensis
- Lucilina tilbrooki
- Lucilina truncata
- Lucilina tydemani
- Lucilina variegata
