= Nuttallochiton =

Scientific classification
- Domain: Eukaryota
- Kingdom: Animalia
- Phylum: Mollusca
- Class: Polyplacophora
- Order: Chitonida
- Family: Mopaliidae
- Subfamily: Mopaliinae
- Genus: Nuttallochiton; Plate, 1899

Synonyms
- Notochiton Thiele, 1906

Genus of molluscs

Nuttallochiton is a genus of chitons; the only one to have paired rather than fused gonads.

== Species ==
There are three species:

- Nuttallochiton hyadesi (Rochebrune, 1889)
- Nuttallochiton martiali (Rochebrune, 1889)
- Nuttallochiton mirandus (Thiele, 1906)
