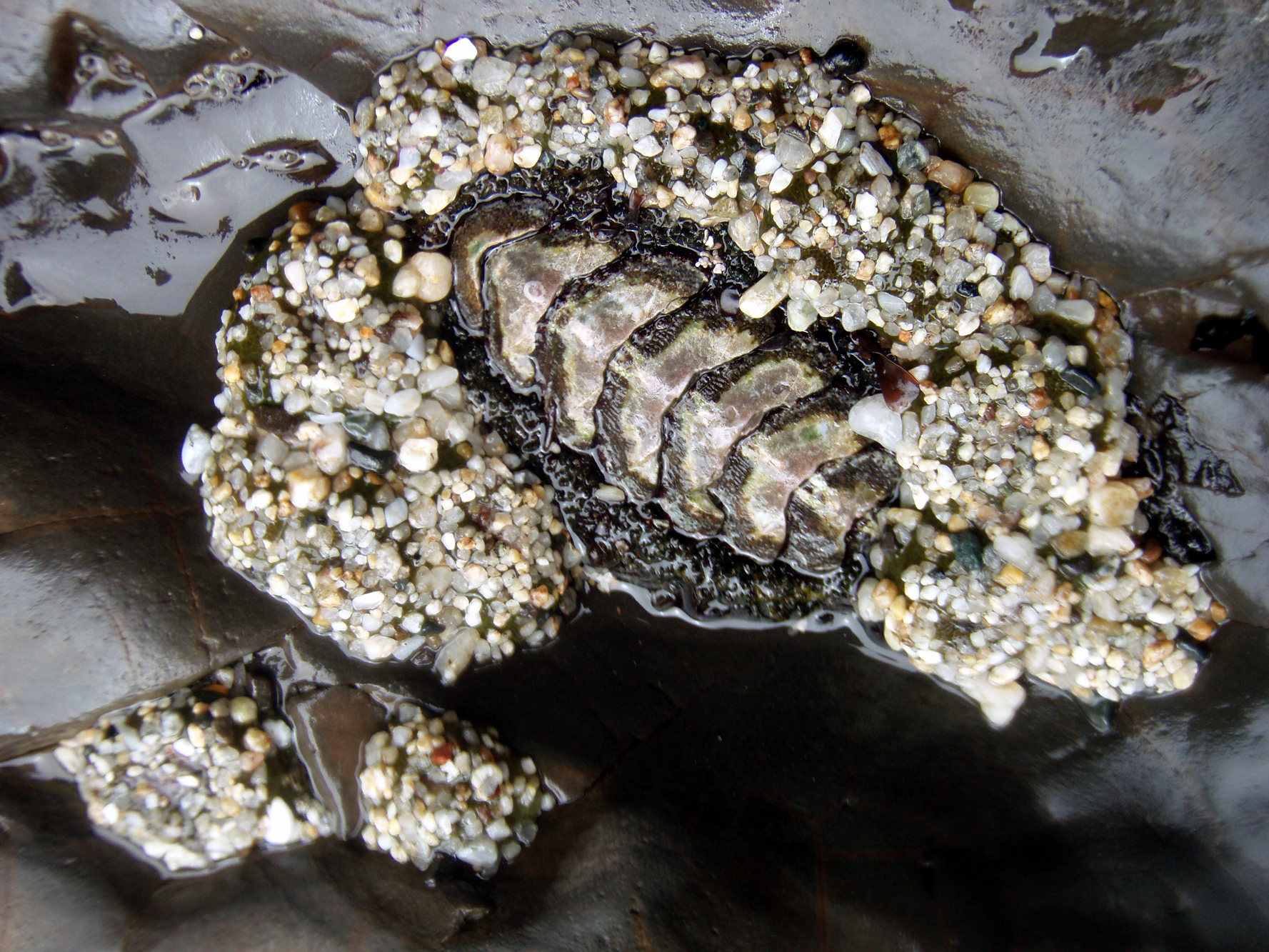

Scientific classification
- Domain: Eukaryota
- Kingdom: Animalia
- Phylum: Mollusca
- Class: Polyplacophora
- Order: Chitonida
- Family: Mopaliidae
- Genus: Mopalia
- Species: M. muscosa

Binomial name
- Mopalia muscosa (Gould, 1846)

Synonyms
- Chiton muscosus Gould, 1846

= Mopalia muscosa =

Species of mollusc

Mopalia muscosa, the mossy chiton, is a species of chiton, a polyplacophoran, an eight-plated marine mollusk. It is a northeastern Pacific species which occurs from British Columbia, Canada, to Baja California Mexico.

This species is found in the middle and lower intertidal zone on exposed rocky shores. Mopalia muscosa can be 40 to 55 mm (1.6 to 2.2 in) in length. Mossy chitons are often covered by algae, barnacles, and limpets. The chiton's girdle is covered with coarse hair-like bristles or "setae".The visible exterior of the chiton's eight shell plates are typically a drab brown or grey-green, however on the underside the shell plates have a vibrant turquoise blue color. Some mossy chitons are biofluorescent mainly around the girdle and may show a bright glowing green color under ultra-violet or blue light. Mossy chitons typically move about at night or when covered by a high tide in order to graze on the red and green algae of which their diet consists. Young chitons have a planktonic stage and later metamorphose and settle on the bottom as adults.

== Gallery ==
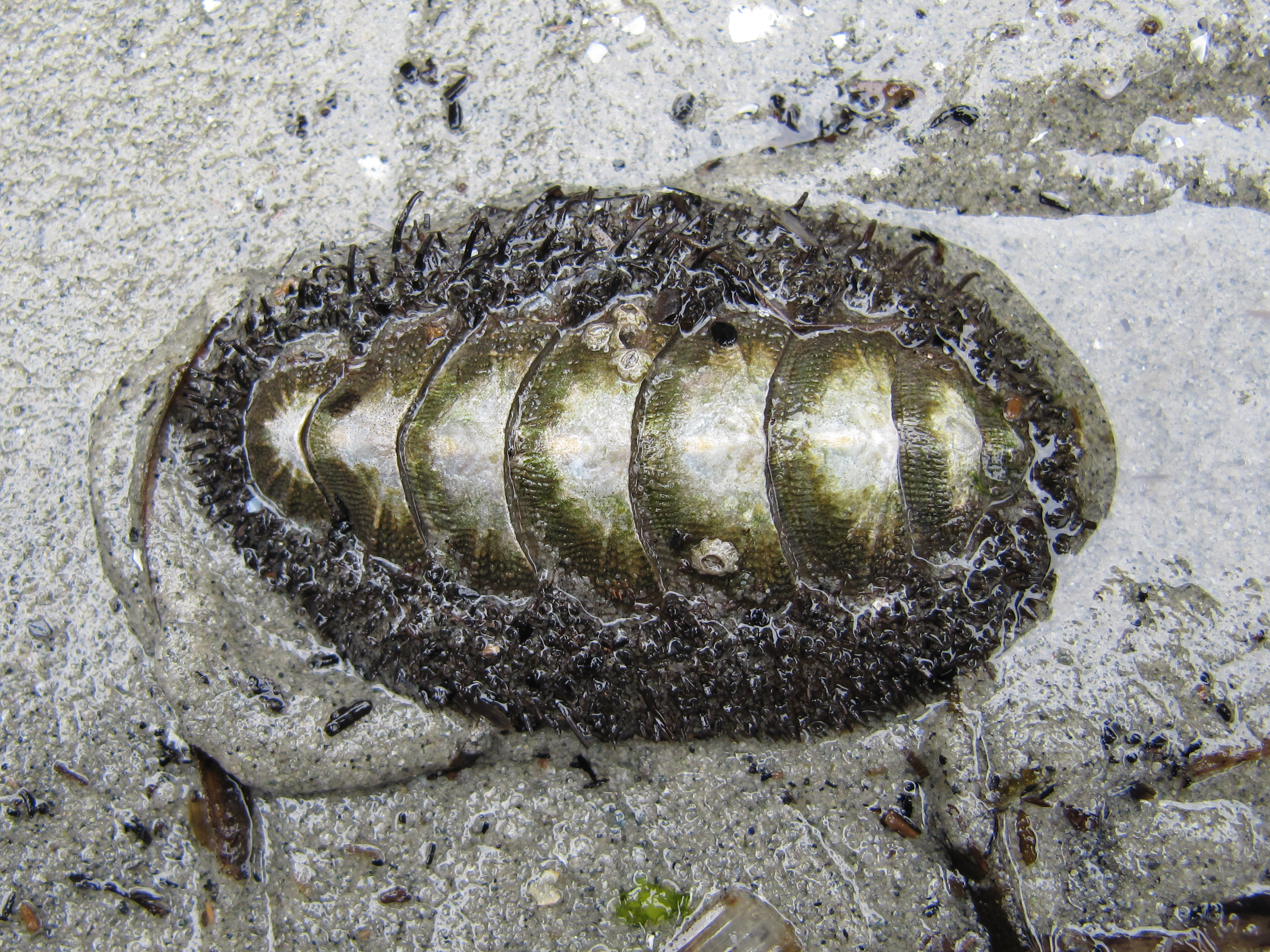
Mossy chiton found in Tribune Bay, Hornby Island British Columbia

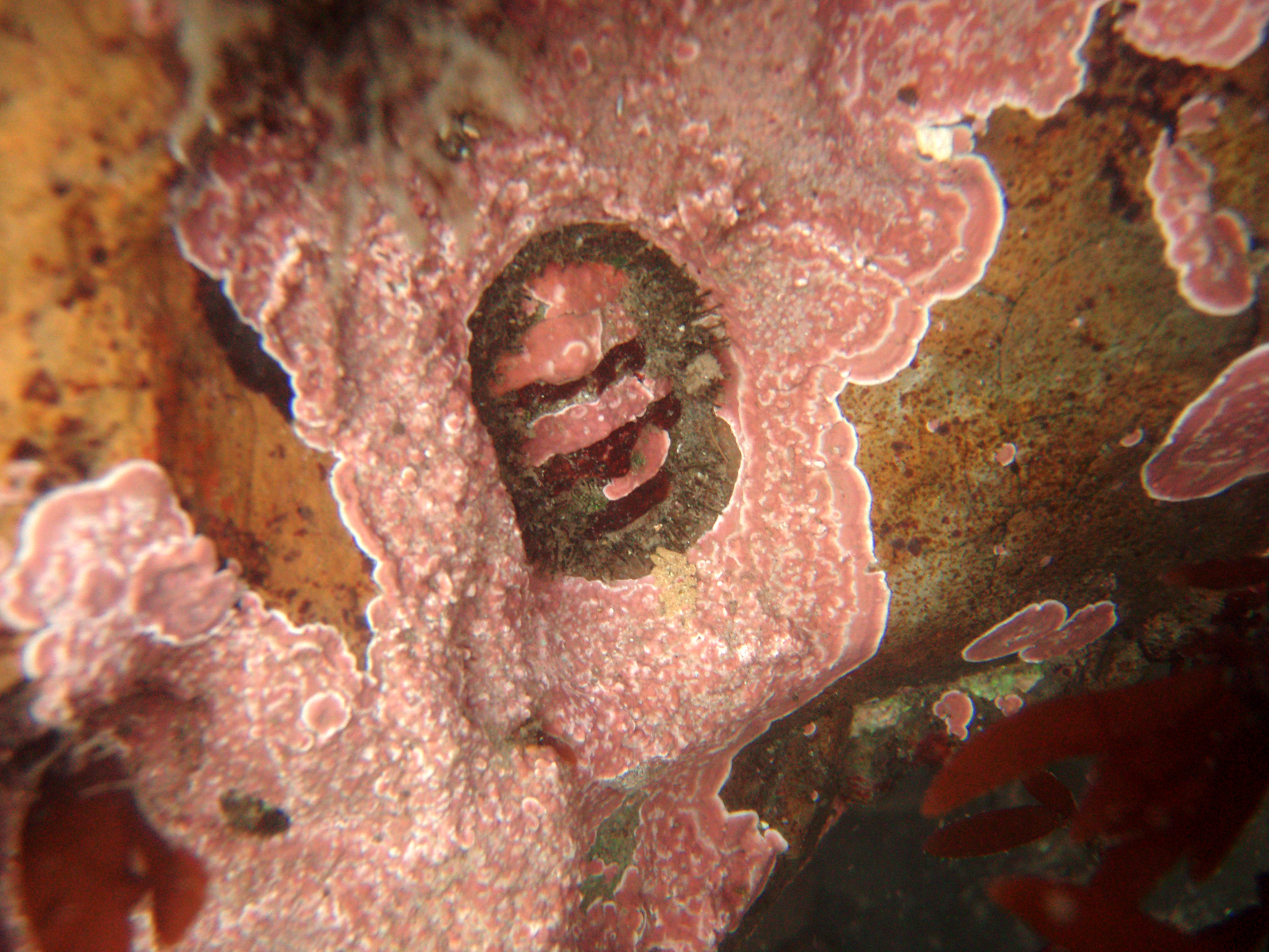
A small specimen covered in and surrounded by encrusting Lithothamnion red alga
