= Mopalia spectabilis =

Scientific classification
- Domain: Eukaryota
- Kingdom: Animalia
- Phylum: Mollusca
- Class: Polyplacophora
- Order: Chitonida
- Family: Mopaliidae
- Genus: Mopalia
- Species: M. spectabilis

Binomial name
- Mopalia spectabilis Cowan & Cowan, 1977

Species of mollusc

Mopalia spectabilis, commonly known as the red-flecked mopalia, is a species of chiton.

== Size and description ==
Mopalia spectabilis is a chiton that has a central area of plates 2-7 pitted in longitudinal rows. The girdle commonly banded light orange and brown. This species nearly always exhibits bright turquoise zigzag markings. The girdle bears prominent hairs that are plumed and are said to look like small “bottle brushes”.

== Similar species ==
Tonicella lineata and Tonicella undocaerulea both have wavey bright blue lines on valves, however both Tonicella species have hairless girdles that are red or pink, often with yellow or white mottling, but never brown bands.

== Distribution and habitat ==
The natural range of M. spectabilis stretches from Kodiak Island, Alaska to Baja California. It is commonly found under ledges and on the bottoms of rocks in intertidal waters to a depth of 10 m (33 feet).

== Biology ==
This chiton feeds on a variety of invertebrates including sponges, hydroids, bryozoans, and tunicates (particularly Metandrocarpa taylori). A species of scaleworm is sometimes found in the mantle cavity. This species often carries hitchhikers attached to its valves, including encrusting bryozoans and small tube worms. Recent molecular systematic studies have suggested that M. spectabilis is not a monophyletic species, with Mopalia ferreirai nested within M. spectabilis.
