= Plaxiphora caelata =

Scientific classification
- Kingdom: Animalia
- Phylum: Mollusca
- Class: Polyplacophora
- Order: Chitonida
- Family: Mopaliidae
- Genus: Plaxiphora
- Species: P. caelata

Binomial name
- Plaxiphora caelata (Reeve, 1847)

Synonyms
- Chiton caelatus Reeve, 1847; Maorichiton caelatus Iredale & Hull, 1932; Maorichiton schauinslandi Iredale & Hull, 1932; Plaxiphora lyallensis Mestayer, 1921

Species of mollusc

Plaxiphora caelata is a small chiton in the family Mopaliidae, endemic to the main islands of New Zealand, Stewart Island and the Chatham Islands.

== Description and habitat ==
A cryptic species up to 45 millimetres long but usually 20-25 millimetres, the shape and colour of the valves is highly variable. Head valve has eight ribs crossed by chevroned wrinkles, median valves a single radial rib on each side, with the tiny tail valve almost triangular. All are cream to dull grey-green coloured with streaks or blotches of dark green, brown, orange or white. The leathery girdle is wide at the sides and narrow at both ends, often with short bristles, usually dark brown with lighter blotches. In the North Island the dorsal surface is sometimes covered in filamentous algae. Like other members of the genus it favours open rock surfaces on wave exposed shores, in crevices or at the base of shaded overhangs in the low intertidal zone.
