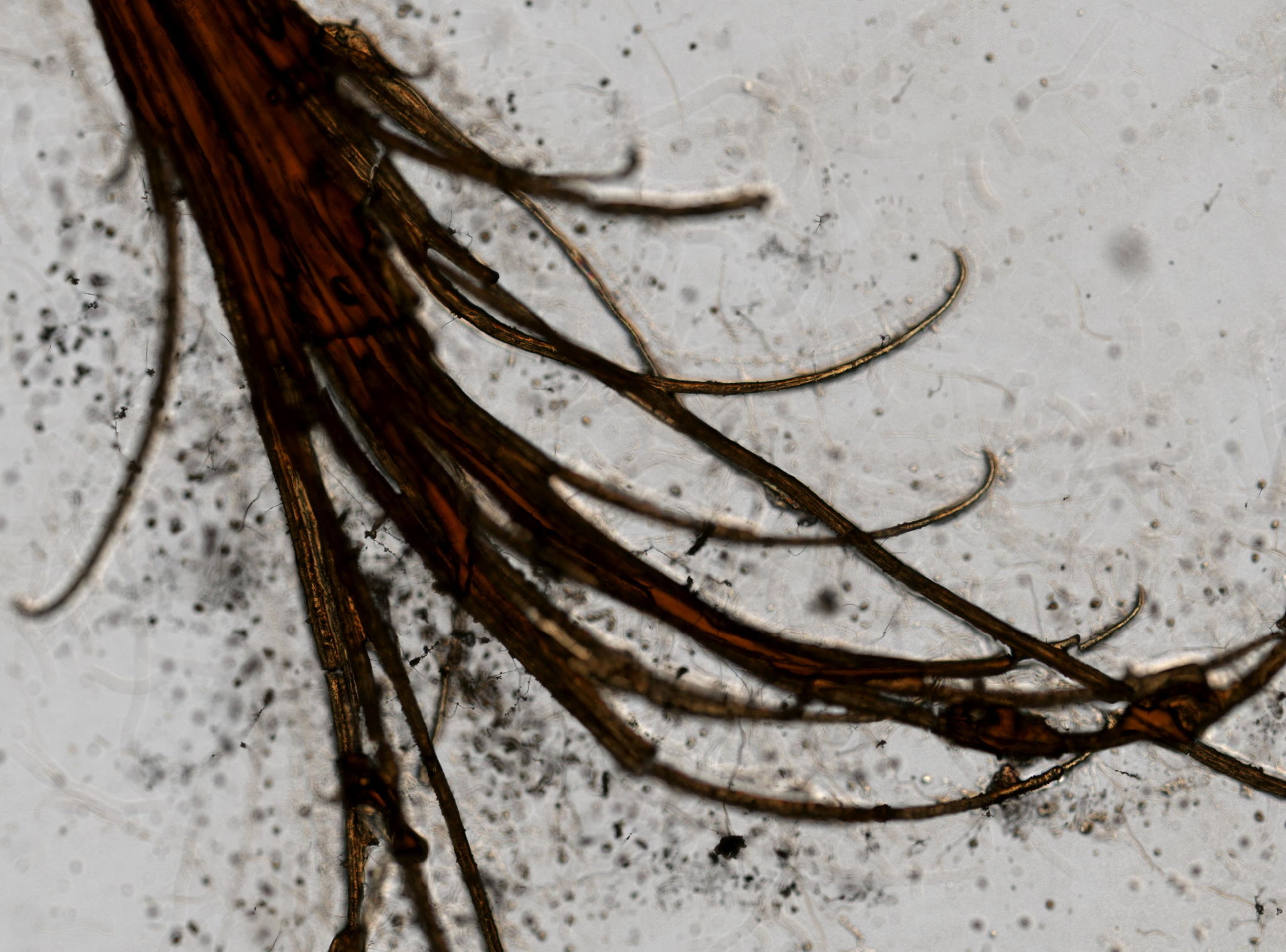

Scientific classification
- Domain: Eukaryota
- Kingdom: Animalia
- Phylum: Mollusca
- Class: Polyplacophora
- Order: Chitonida
- Family: Mopaliidae
- Genus: Amicula; Gray, 1847

= Amicula (chiton) =

Genus of molluscs

Amicula is a genus of chitons belonging to the family Mopaliidae.

The species of this genus are found in Northern America.

Species:

- Amicula amiculata (Pallas, 1787)
- Amicula gurjanovae Jakovleva, 1952
- Amicula vestita (Broderip & Sowerby I, 1829)
