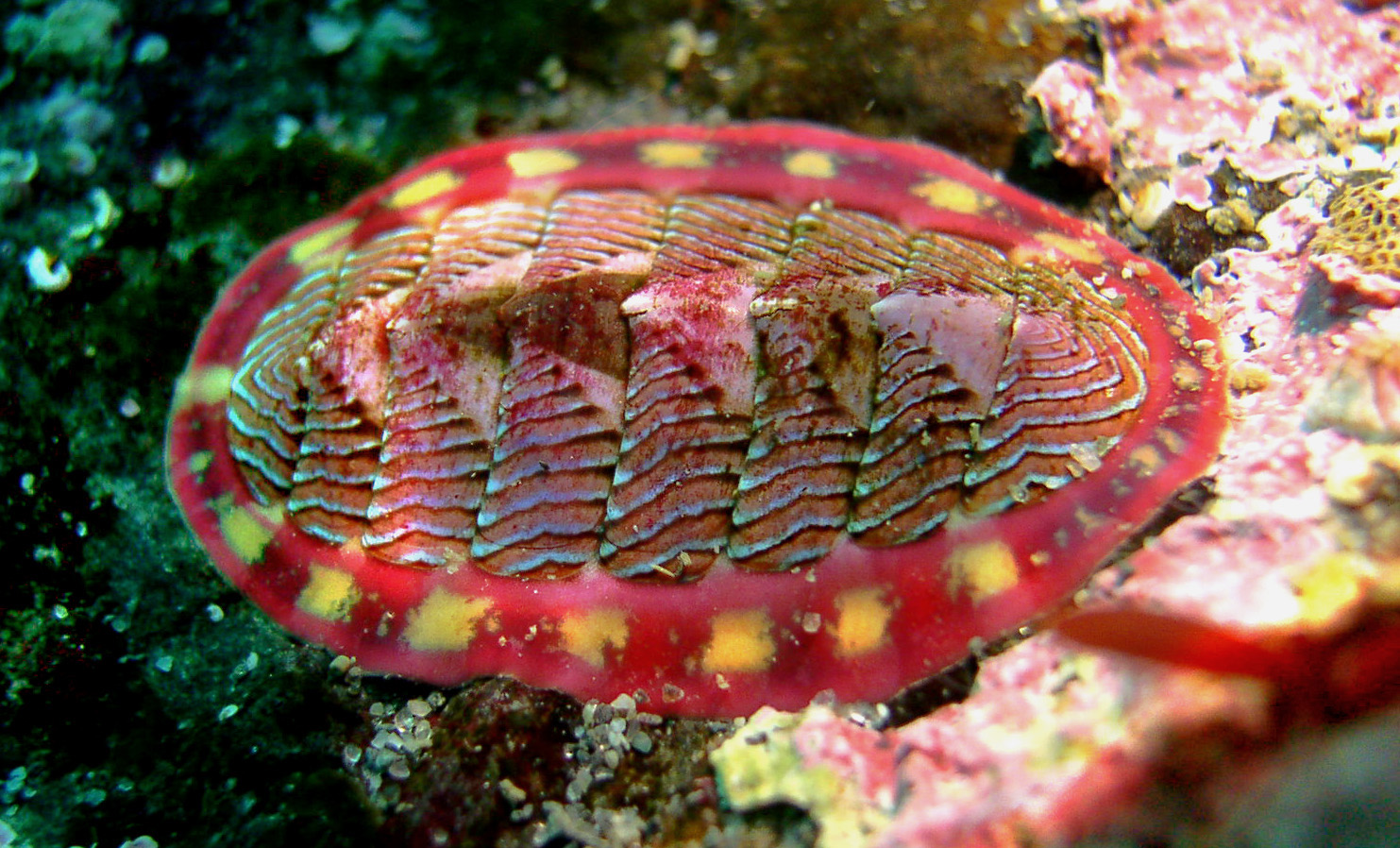
- Tonicella lineata live and in situ, anterior end towards the right

Scientific classification
- Kingdom: Animalia
- Phylum: Mollusca
- Class: Polyplacophora
- Order: Chitonida
- Family: Tonicellidae
- Genus: Tonicella; Carpenter, 1873

Type species
- Chiton marmoreus Fabricius, 1780

Species
- See text.

= Tonicella =

Genus of molluscs

Tonicella is a genus of chitons known as the lined chitons.

The genus name derives from the Greek tonos (something stretched, a brace, a strain) and cell (diminutive).

== Species ==
Species within the genus Tonicella include:

Image	Scientific name	Distribution
	Tonicella insignis	coastal region of Alaska to Oregon in North America The shell protects themselves from predators by blending their body into the environment. The special white line on T. insignis is one of the most distinguish characteristic which only exist on the second to the seventh valve.
	Tonicella lineata	from the Aleutian Islands of Alaska to San Miguel Island of California, as well as the Sea of Okhotsk of Russia and northern Japan.
	Tonicella lokii	Eastern Central Pacific
	Tonicella marmorea	the Arctic Ocean and the North Atlantic Ocean.
	Tonicella solidior	
	Tonicella squamigera	
	Tonicella submarmorea	Sea of Okhotsk
	Tonicella undocaerulea	from Kodiak, Alaska to Point Conception, California.
	Tonicella venusta	Monterey Bay, California
	Tonicella zotini	
