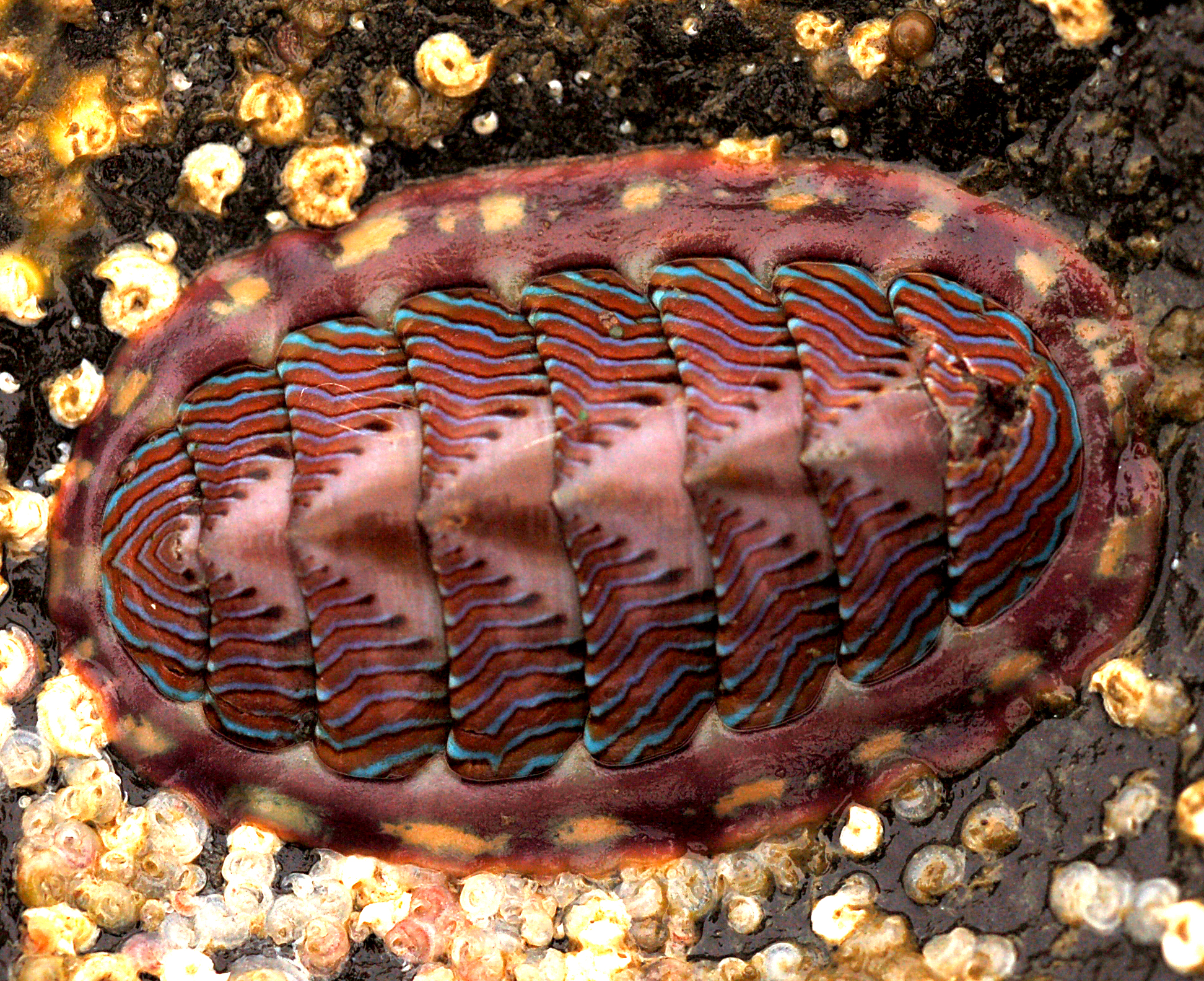
- Tonicella lineata

Scientific classification
- Kingdom: Animalia
- Phylum: Mollusca
- Class: Polyplacophora
- Order: Chitonida
- Family: Tonicellidae

= Tonicellidae =

Family of molluscs

Tonicellidae is a family of molluscs belonging to the order Chitonida.

Genera:

- Boreochiton Sars, 1878
- Spongioradsia Pilsbry, 1894
- Strictochiton Sirenko, 2020
- Tonicella Carpenter, 1873
