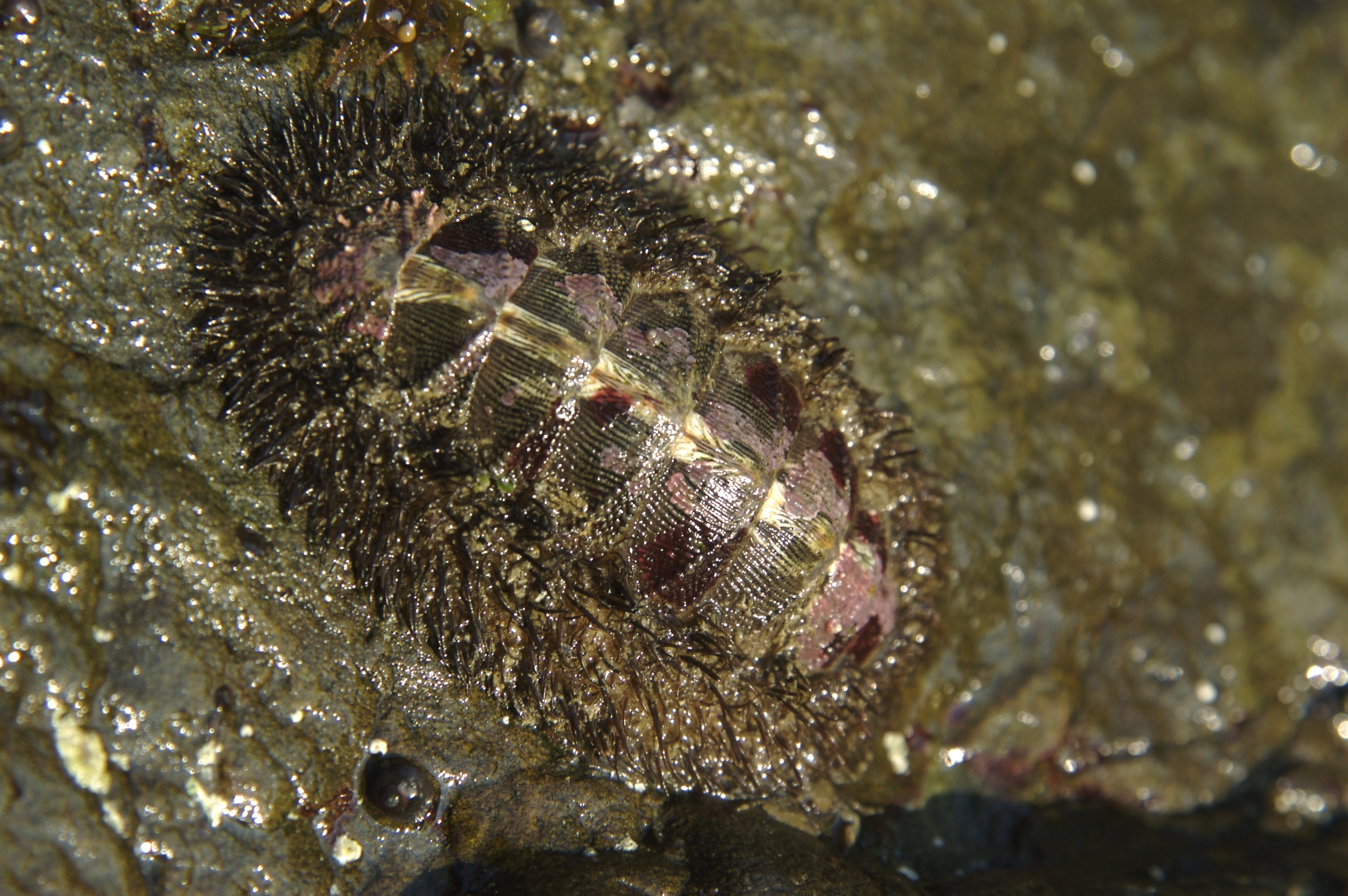
- Mopalia muscosa

Scientific classification
- Kingdom: Animalia
- Phylum: Mollusca
- Class: Polyplacophora
- Order: Chitonida
- Suborder: Chitonina
- Family: Mopaliidae; Dall, 1889

= Mopaliidae =

Family of molluscs

Mopaliidae is a family of marine molluscs in the class Polyplacophora.

== Genera ==
There are 10 recognized genera:

- Amicula Gray, 1847
- Dendrochiton Berry, 1911
- Gallardochiton Sirenko, 2007
- Katharina Gray, 1847
- Mopalia Gray, 1847
- Mopaliella Thiele, 1909
- Nuttallochiton Plate, 1899
- Placiphorella Dall, 1879
- Placiphorina Kaas & Van Belle, 1994
- Plaxiphora Gray, 1847 (synonym Maorichiton Iredale, 1914)
