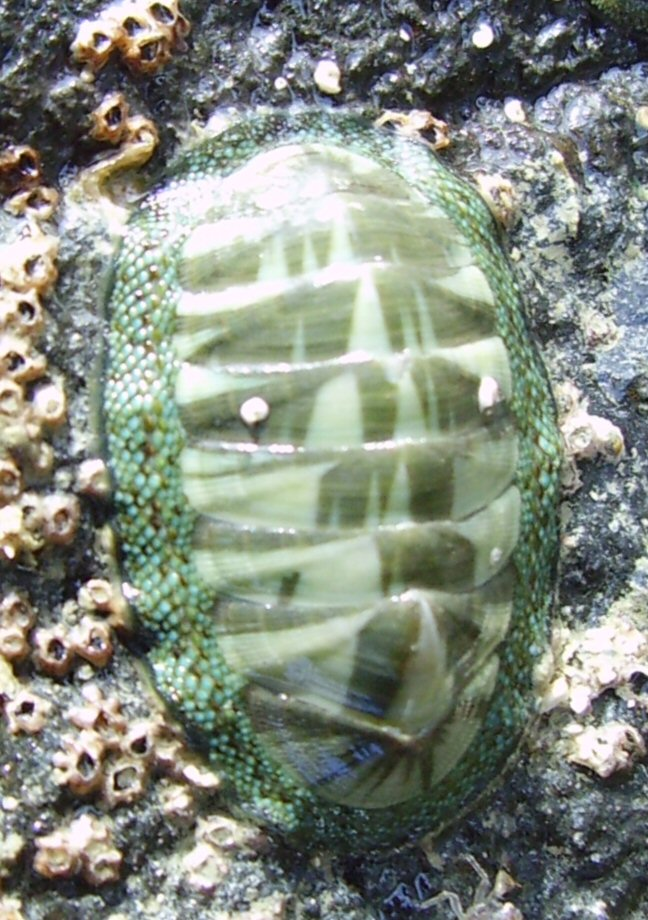
- Chiton glaucus

Scientific classification
- Kingdom: Animalia
- Phylum: Mollusca
- Class: Polyplacophora
- Order: Chitonida
- Family: Chitonidae
- Subfamily: Chitoninae
- Genus: Chiton; Linnaeus, 1758

Type species
- Chiton tuberculatus Linnaeus, 1758

Species
- See text.

Synonyms
- Amaurochiton Thiele, 1893; Chiton (Chiton) Linnaeus, 1758 · alternate representation; Chiton (Lophyrus) Poli, 1791; Chiton (Sclerochiton) Dall, 1882 (invalid: junior homonym of Sclerochiton Kraatz, 1859 (Coleoptera)); Oscabrion Herrmannsen, 1847 (refers to Oscabrion Petiver, 1702); Sclerochiton Dall, 1882 (invalid: junior homonym of Sclerochiton Kraatz, 1859 (Coleoptera) )

= Chiton (genus) =

Chiton Temporal range: Carboniferous–Recent

Genus of molluscs

Chiton is a genus of chitons, a polyplacophoran mollusk in the family Chitonidae.

== Taxonomy ==
The genus Chiton has been split into several subgenera as follows:

- Subgenus Chiton (Chiton) Linnaeus, 1758
  - Chiton (Chiton) albolineatus Broderip & Sowerby, 1829
  - Chiton (Chiton) articulatus Sowerby in Broderip & Sowerby, 1832
  - Chiton (Chiton) bowenii King & Broderip, 1831
  - Chiton (Chiton) ceylanicus E. A. Smith, 1904
  - Chiton (Chiton) connectens Thiele, 1909
  - Chiton (Chiton) cumingsii Frembly, 1827
  - Chiton (Chiton) glaucus Gray, 1828
  - Chiton (Chiton) granoradiatus Leloup, 1937
  - Chiton (Chiton) granosus Frembly, 1827 (nomen nudum)
  - Chiton (Chiton) groschi Kaas, 1979
  - Chiton (Chiton) kaasi (Leloup, 1981)
  - Chiton (Chiton) laterorugosus Kaas, 1986
  - Chiton (Chiton) magnificus (Deshayes, 1844)
  - Chiton (Chiton) marmoratus Gmelin, 1791
  - Chiton (Chiton) marquesanus Pilsbry, 1893
  - Chiton (Chiton) squamosus Linnaeus, 1764
  - Chiton (Chiton) stokesii Broderip in Broderip & Sowerby, 1832
  - Chiton (Chiton) tuberculatus Linnaeus, 1758 – West Indian green chiton
  - Chiton (Chiton) virgulatus Sowerby, 1840
  - Chiton (Chiton) viridis Spengler, 1797
- Subgenus Chiton (Mucrosquama) (Iredale & Hull, 1926)
  - Chiton (Mucrosquama) carnosus Carpenter in Angas, 1867
  - Chiton (Mucrosquama) particolor (Hull, 1923)
  - Chiton (Mucrosquama) verconis Torr & Ashby, 1898
- Subgenus Chiton (Rhyssoplax) (Thiele, 1893)
  - Chiton (Rhyssoplax) affinis Issel, 1869
  - Chiton (Rhyssoplax) baliensis (Bullock, 1989)
  - Chiton (Rhyssoplax) barnardi Ashby, 1931
  - Chiton (Rhyssoplax) bednalli Pilsbry, 1895
  - Chiton (Rhyssoplax) burmanus Carpenter in Pilsbry, 1893
  - Chiton (Rhyssoplax) calliozonus Pilsbry, 1894
  - Chiton (Rhyssoplax) canariensis d'Orbigny, 1839
  - Chiton (Rhyssoplax) corallinus (Risso, 1826)
  - Chiton (Rhyssoplax) corypheus Hedley & Hull, 1912
  - Chiton (Rhyssoplax) coxi Pilsbry, 1894
  - Chiton (Rhyssoplax) crawfordi Sykes, 1899
  - Chiton (Rhyssoplax) densiliratus Carpenter in Pilsbry, 1893
  - Chiton (Rhyssoplax) diaphorus (Iredale & May, 1916)
  - Chiton (Rhyssoplax) discolor Souverbie in Souverbie & Montrouzier, 1866
  - Chiton (Rhyssoplax) ectypus (de Rochebrune, 1884)
  - Chiton (Rhyssoplax) exasperatus (Iredale, 1914)
  - Chiton (Rhyssoplax) exoptandus Bednall, 1897
  - Chiton (Rhyssoplax) fosteri Bullock, 1972
  - Chiton (Rhyssoplax) funereus Hedley & Hull, 1912
  - Chiton (Rhyssoplax) heterodon (Pilsbry, 1893)
  - Chiton (Rhyssoplax) jugosus Gould, 1846
  - Chiton (Rhyssoplax) kimberi Ashby, 1928
  - Chiton (Rhyssoplax) kurodai Is. & Iw. Taki, 1929
  - Chiton (Rhyssoplax) linsleyi (Burghardt, 1973)
  - Chiton (Rhyssoplax) mauritianus Quoy & Gaimard, 1835
  - Chiton (Rhyssoplax) olivaceus Spengler, 1797
  - Chiton (Rhyssoplax) oruktus Maughan, 1900
  - Chiton (Rhyssoplax) peregrinus Thiele, 1909
  - Chiton (Rhyssoplax) perviridis Carpenter, 1865
  - Chiton (Rhyssoplax) phaseolinus di Monterosato, 1879
  - Chiton (Rhyssoplax) politus Spengler, 1797
  - Chiton (Rhyssoplax) pulvinatus Carpenter in Pilsbry, 1893
  - Chiton (Rhyssoplax) rapaitiensis Schwabe & Lozouet, 2006
  - Chiton (Rhyssoplax) rhynchotus (de Rochebrune, 1884)
  - Chiton (Rhyssoplax) salihafui Bullock, 1972
  - Chiton (Rhyssoplax) speciosus Nierstrasz, 1905
  - Chiton (Rhyssoplax) subassimilis Souverbie in Souverbie & Montrouzier, 1866
  - Chiton (Rhyssoplax) tectiformis (Is. Taki, 1938)
  - Chiton (Rhyssoplax) torrianus Hedley & Hull, 1910
  - Chiton (Rhyssoplax) translucens Hedley & Hull, 1909
  - Chiton (Rhyssoplax) tricostalis Pilsbry, 1894
  - Chiton (Rhyssoplax) vauclusensis Hedley & Hull, 1909
  - Chiton (Rhyssoplax) whitleyi (Iredale & Hull, 1932)
- Subgenus Chiton (Tegulaplax) (Iredale & Hull, 1926)
  - Chiton (Tegulaplax) boucheti Kaas, 1989
  - Chiton (Tegulaplax) hululensis (Smith E.A. in Gardiner, 1903)
  - Chiton (Tegulaplax) pulchrus (Kaas, 1991)

Synonyms:

- Chiton (Chiton) aorangi Creese & O'Neill, 1987: Synonym of Sypharochiton aorangi (Creese & O'Neill, 1987)
- Chiton (Chiton) lyratus Sowerby, 1840: Synonym of Chiton (Rhyssoplax) canariensis d'Orbigny, 1840
- Chiton (Chiton) pelliserpentis Quoy & Gaimard, 1835: Synonym of Sypharochiton pelliserpentis (Quoy & Gaimard, 1835)
- Chiton (Chiton) themeropis (Iredale, 1914): Synonym of Sypharochiton themeropis Iredale, 1914
- Chiton (Chiton) torri Suter, 1907: Synonym of Sypharochiton torri (Suter, 1907)
- Chiton (Rhyssoplax) aereus Reeve, 1847: Synonym of Rhyssoplax aerea (Reeve, 1847)
- Chiton (Rhyssoplax) bullocki (Sirenko, 2012): Synonym of Rhyssoplax bullocki Sirenko, 2012
- Chiton (Rhyssoplax) canaliculatus Quoy & Gaimard, 1835: Synonym of Rhyssoplax canaliculata (Quoy & Gaimard, 1835)
- Chiton (Rhyssoplax) komaianus Is. & Iw. Taki, 1929: Synonym of Rhyssoplax komaiana (Is. & Iw. Taki, 1929)
- Chiton (Rhyssoplax) maldivensis (E. A. Smith, 1903): Synonym of Rhyssoplax maldivensis (E. A. Smith, 1903)
- Chiton (Rhyssoplax) pulcherrimus Sowerby, 1842: Synonym of Rhyssoplax pulcherrima (Sowerby, 1842)
- Chiton (Rhyssoplax) stangeri Reeve, 1847: Synonym of Rhyssoplax stangeri (Reeve, 1847)
- Chiton (Rhyssoplax) venustus (Hull, 1923): Synonym of Rhyssoplax venusta Hull, 1923
- Chiton laevigatus Flemming, 1828: Synonym of Tonicella marmorea (O. Fabricius, 1780)
- Chiton striatus Barnes, 1824: Synonym of Chiton (Rhyssoplax) olivaceus Spengler, 1797
- Chiton tulipa Quoy & Gaimard, 1835: Synonym of Chiton (Rhyssoplax) politus Spengler, 1797
