= Chiton salihafui =

Scientific classification
- Kingdom: Animalia
- Phylum: Mollusca
- Class: Polyplacophora
- Order: Chitonida
- Family: Chitonidae
- Genus: Chiton
- Species: C. salihafui

Binomial name
- Chiton salihafui (Bullock, 1972)

Synonyms
- Chiton (Rhyssoplax) salihafui Bullock, 1972

Species of mollusc

Chiton salihafui, the python chiton, is a medium-sized polyplacophoran mollusc in the family Chitonidae, found on the west coast of Africa.

== Description ==
The valves are each bear an elongate dark triangle which is offset by a lighter area, and their central portions are marked with clear longitudinal striations. The girdle is covered with smooth, overlapping scales. The species somewhat resembles Chiton politus. Average adult length is 40 mm.

== Distribution and habitat ==
C. salihafui occurs along the west coast of Africa, having been recorded from Tanzania, Somalia, Mozambique and the northernmost part of South Africa, where the only known colony is a single location in Maputaland. It can be found under shady overhangs relatively high on the shore.

== Conservation ==
The species is collected for use in traditional medicine, a practice that may have led to considerable depletion of the limited populations in the southern extremes of its range. It has been suggested that collectors be co-opted into conservation efforts by asking them to collect preferentially from the lower parts of the shore, thus shifting the pressure onto the more common Onithochiton literatus.
