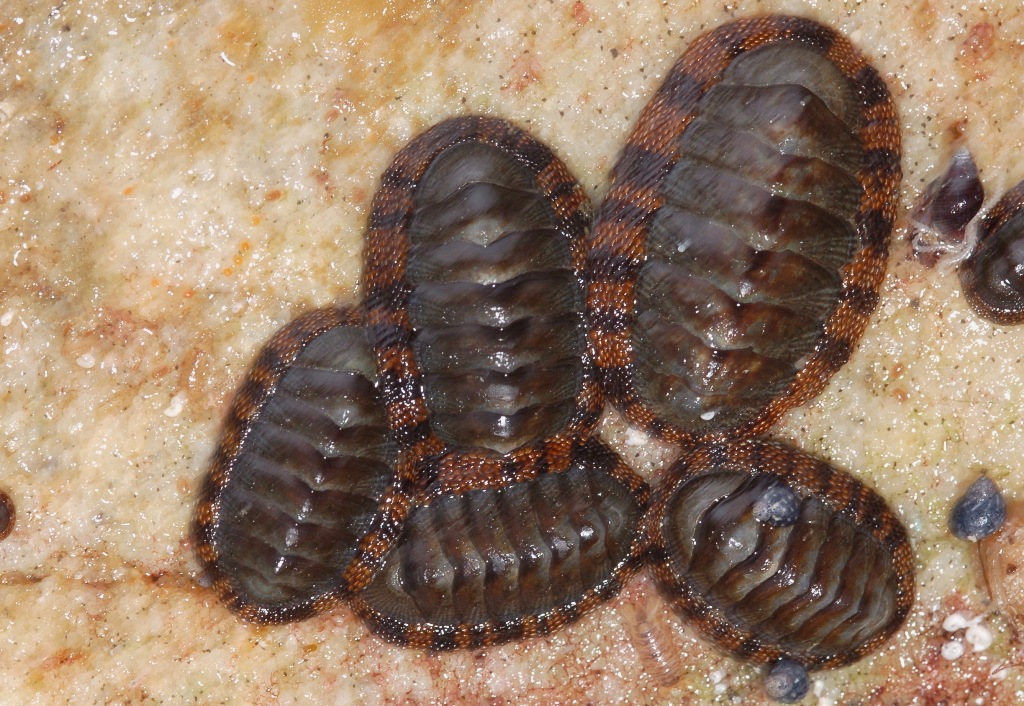

Scientific classification
- Kingdom: Animalia
- Phylum: Mollusca
- Class: Polyplacophora
- Order: Chitonida
- Family: Chitonidae
- Genus: Radsia
- Species: R. nigrovirescens

Binomial name
- Radsia nigrovirescens (Blainville, 1825)

Synonyms
- Chiton nigrovirescens Blainville, 1825

= Radsia nigrovirescens =

Species of mollusc

Radsia nigrovirescens, the brooding chiton, is a small polyplacophoran mollusc in the family Chitonidae, found on the west coast of southern Africa.

== Description ==
The valves of the shell are dark brown to black and bear indistinct radiating ridges. The girdle is of a rufous color and has a black band; it is covered with large, smooth scales that may have a coppery sheen. Individuals are 10–25 mm in length.

== Distribution and habitat ==
Radsia nigrovirescens occurs along the western portion of the south coast of Africa, from Cape Columbine in Namibia to Cape Agulhas in South Africa. The species forms tightly packed groups that can be found under stones below the inter-tidal zone.

== Ecology ==
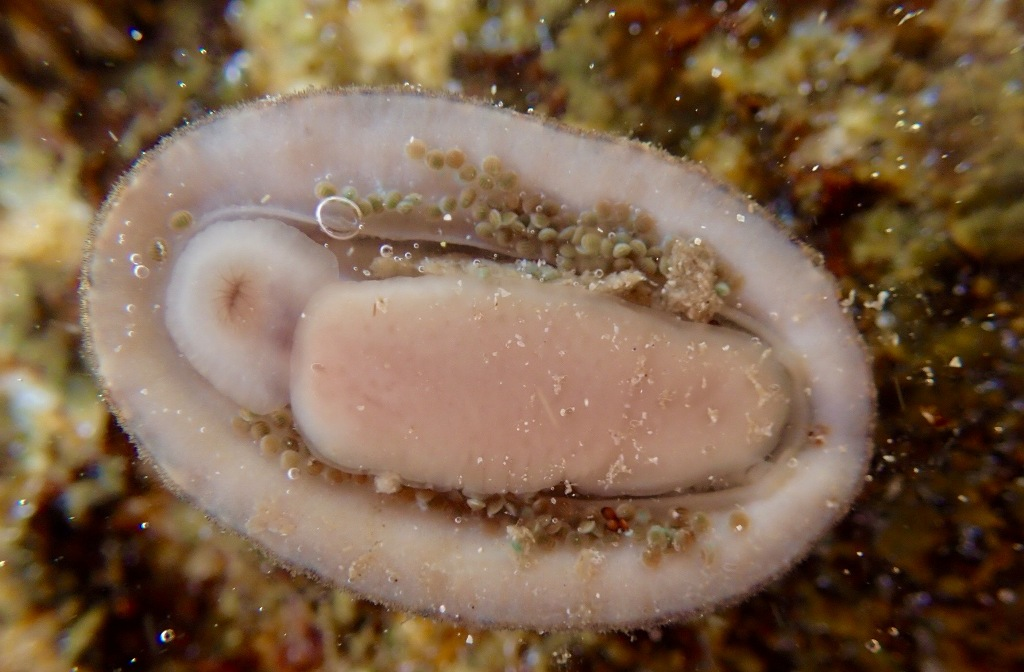
Underside view of brooding specimen. The juvenile chitons are visible clustered beneath the parent's girdle.

The species derives its common name from the unusual adaptation of brooding its eggs under its girdle, protecting them until they develop into fully formed baby chitons.
