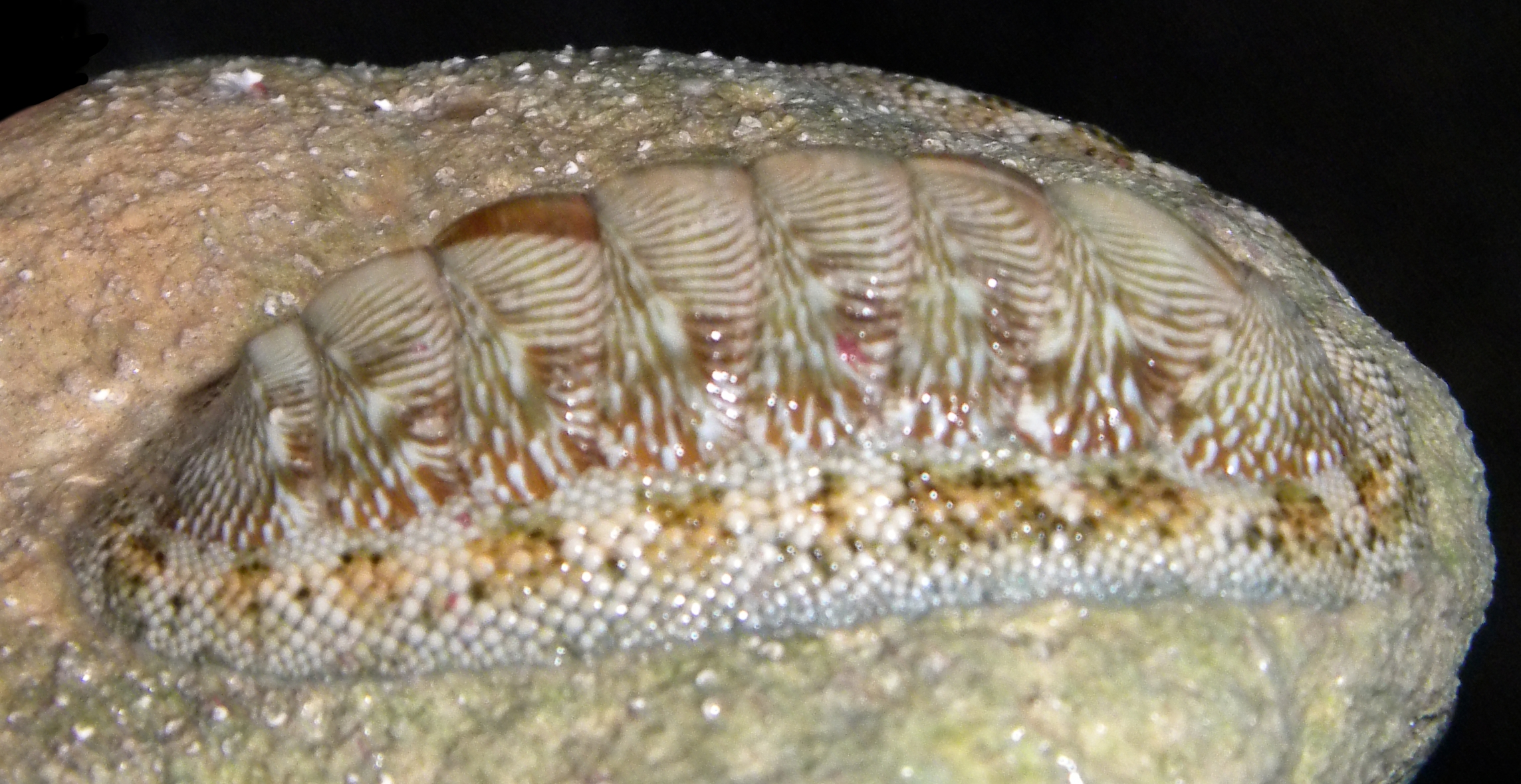
- Chiton tuberculatus

Scientific classification
- Kingdom: Animalia
- Phylum: Mollusca
- Class: Polyplacophora
- Order: Chitonida
- Family: Chitonidae
- Genus: Chiton
- Species: C. tuberculatus

Binomial name
- Chiton tuberculatus Linnaeus, 1758

= Chiton tuberculatus =

Species of mollusc

Chiton tuberculatus, the West Indian green chiton, is a species of chiton, a marine polyplacophoran mollusk in the family Chitonidae, the typical chitons. It was first described in 1758 by Carl Linnaeus and can be found throughout the Caribbean Sea.

== Description ==
Chiton tuberculatus, is one of the largest chitons occurring in the Caribbean can reach an average length of about 50–60 mm (2.0–2.4 in). The dorsal surface of the valves is mainly grayish to brownish green. The valves are ribbed, dull grayish green or greenish brown, with a spicule-covered mantle girdle alternating zones of whitish, green or black.

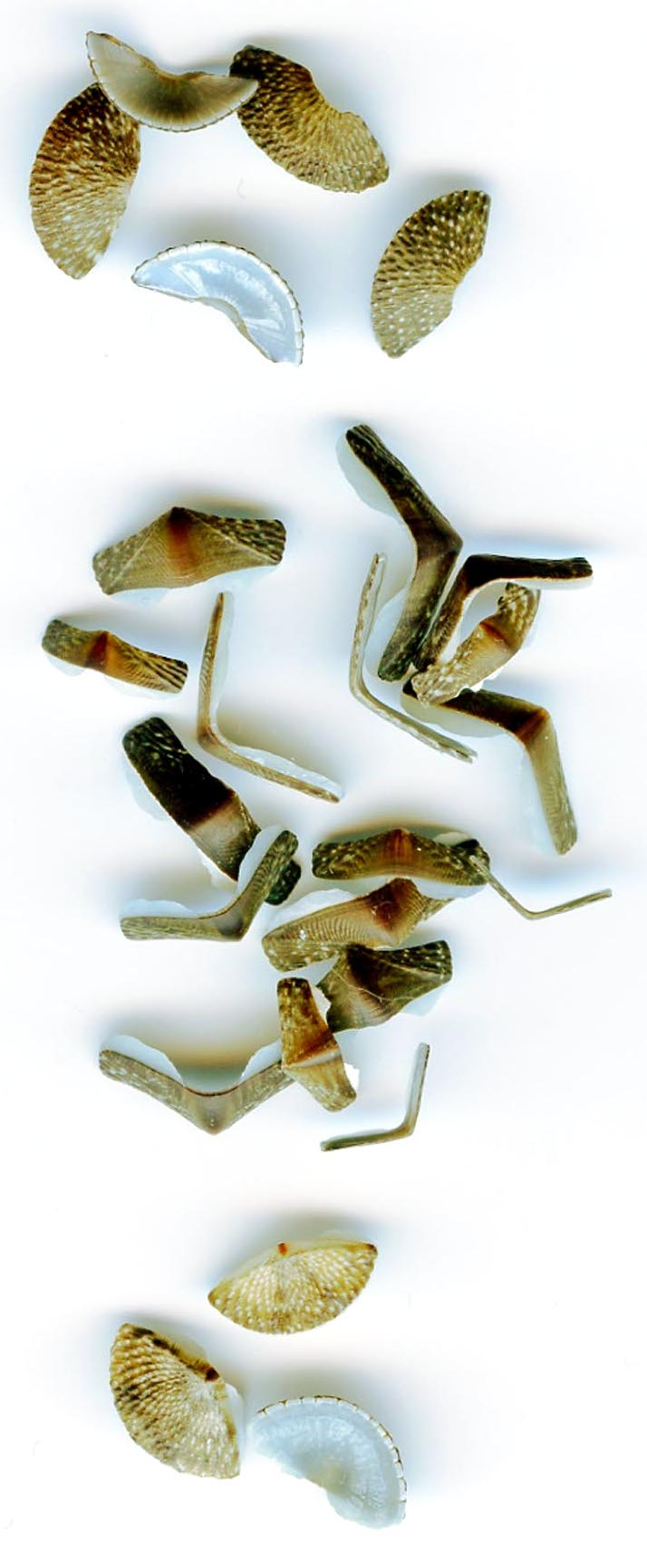
Disarticulated valves or plates

== Distribution and habitat ==
This species can be found under rocks and in spray zones of rocky shores, in the intertidal, shallow subtidal zone, about 4 meters deep. It range spans in the Western Central Atlantic (USA, Colombia, Bermuda, Mexico, Venezuela and the West Indies).

== Feeding and behavior ==
The West Indian green chiton is a nocturnal grazer which mainly feeds on algae growing on rocks at night. It also has a "homing" behavior, which means after short feeding excursions, it returns to its original resting place. It may also live as long as 12 years.

== Gallery ==
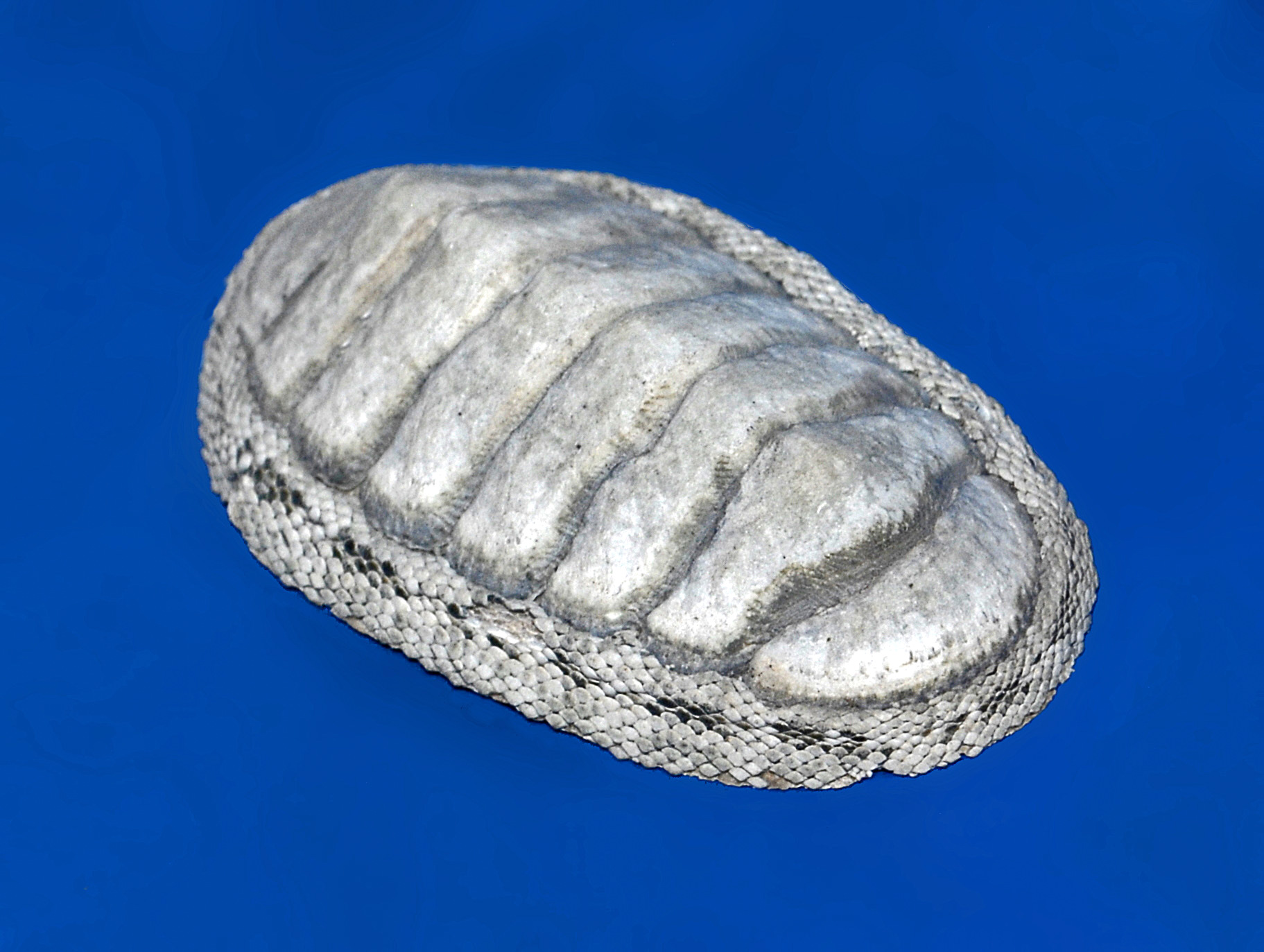
Chiton tuberculatus. Museum specimen

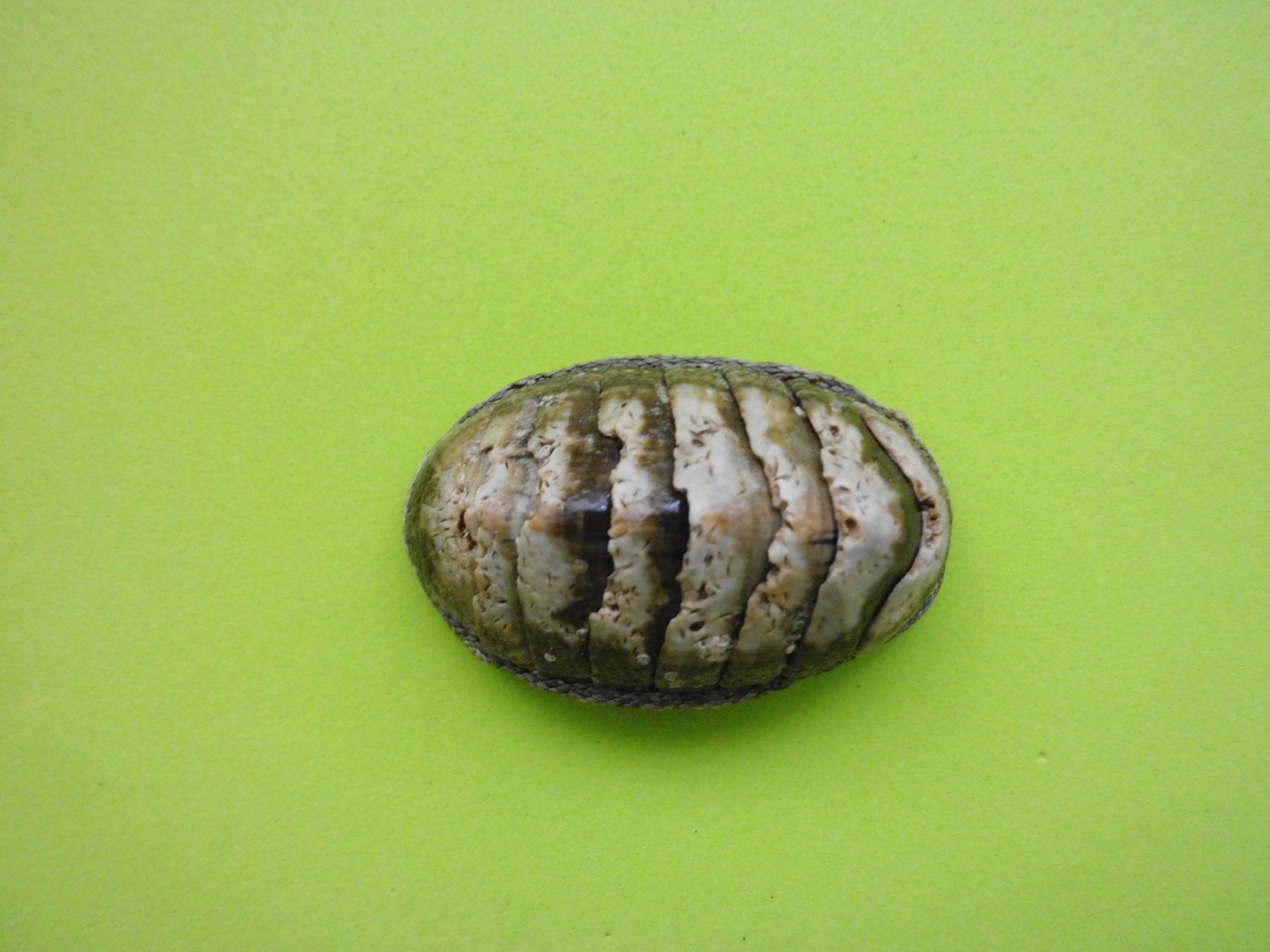
Dorsal view

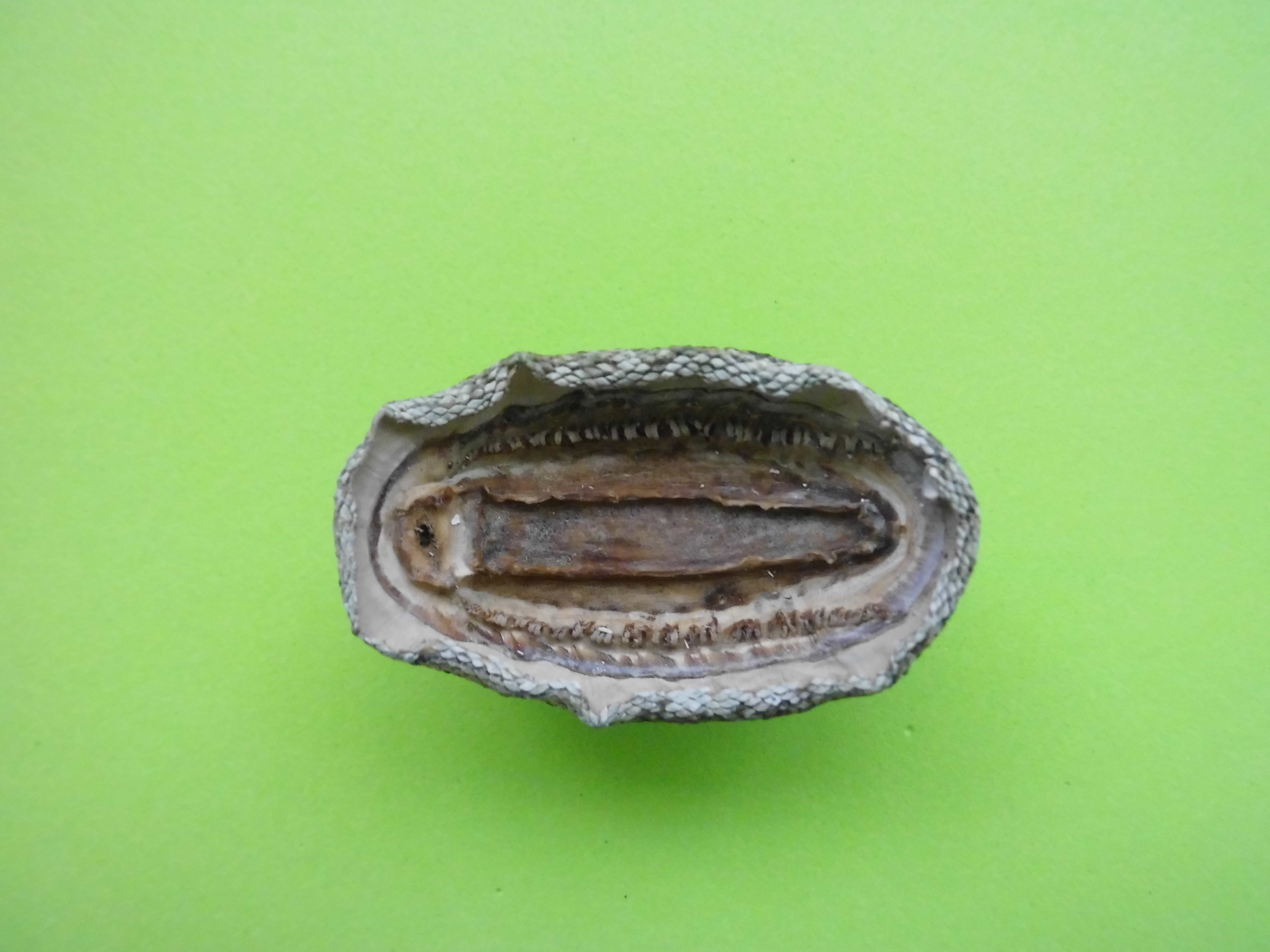
Ventral view

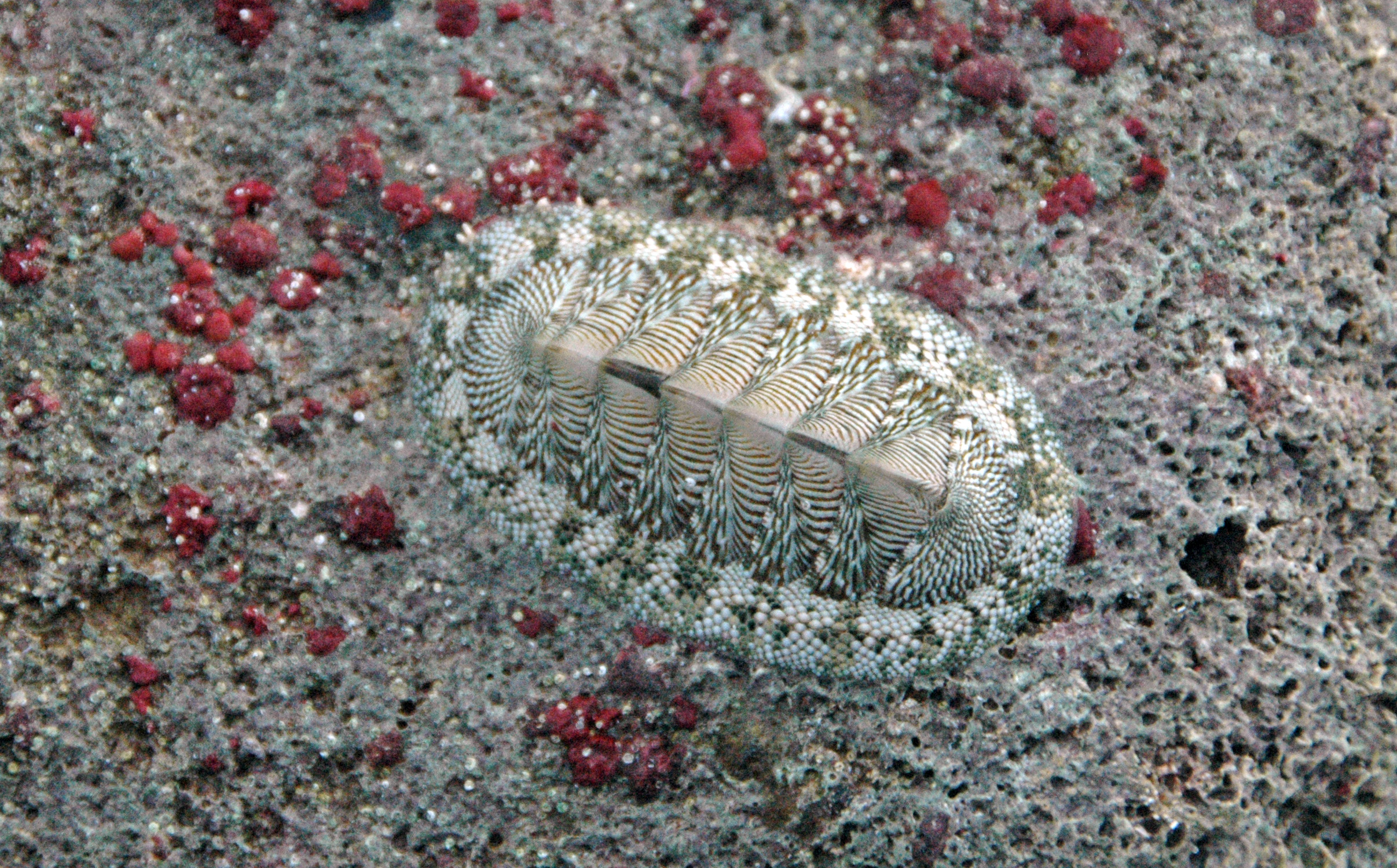
A live individual of Chiton tuberculatus
