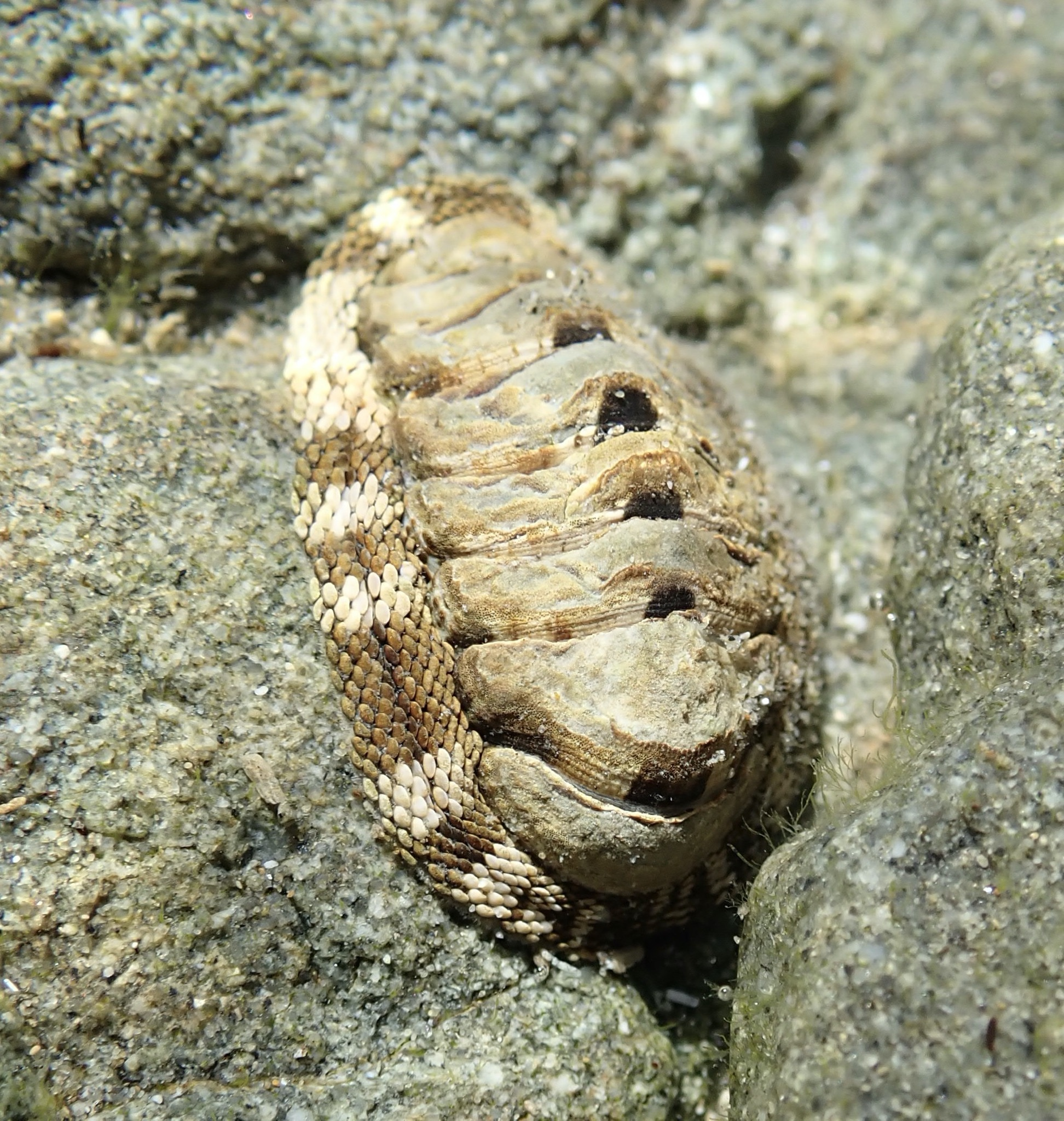

Scientific classification
- Kingdom: Animalia
- Phylum: Mollusca
- Class: Polyplacophora
- Order: Chitonida
- Family: Chitonidae
- Genus: Sypharochiton
- Species: S. pelliserpentis

Binomial name
- Sypharochiton pelliserpentis (Quoy and Gaimard, 1835)

Synonyms
- Chiton pelliserpentis Quoy & Gaimard, 1835

= Sypharochiton pelliserpentis =

Species of mollusc

Sypharochiton pelliserpentis is a species of chiton in the family Chitonidae. As the species name suggests, the surface of the girdle in this chiton has a pattern of overlaying scales resembling snakeskin, and it is commonly referred to as the snakeskin chiton. The Māori name for the species is papatua.

== Distribution ==
The snakeskin chiton, Sypharochiton pelliserpentis, has a country-wide distribution around New Zealand – including the Chatham Islands, and is also distributed around the coasts of Tasmania, Victoria and New South Wales in Australia. S. pelliserpentis is often extremely numerous on New Zealand shores, reaching densities of up to 228 individuals per square metre, and it has been shown to occupy a wide range of shore levels wherever there is a solid substrate available – from inner estuaries to high energy surf beaches. Generally it is located on rock surfaces rather than under stones, and is often found above neap high water mark.

== Description ==
S. pelliserpentis can be distinguished from its sister taxa Sypharochiton sinclairi by a lack of longitudinal striping on the valves, a more olive colour (rather than turquoise for S. sinclairi) and by radula length. S. sinclairi also occupies a different station, with S. pelliserpentis generally found on top of rocks above mid tide while S. sinclari is generally located under stones and in rock pools over the lower tidal and sub-tidal region.
