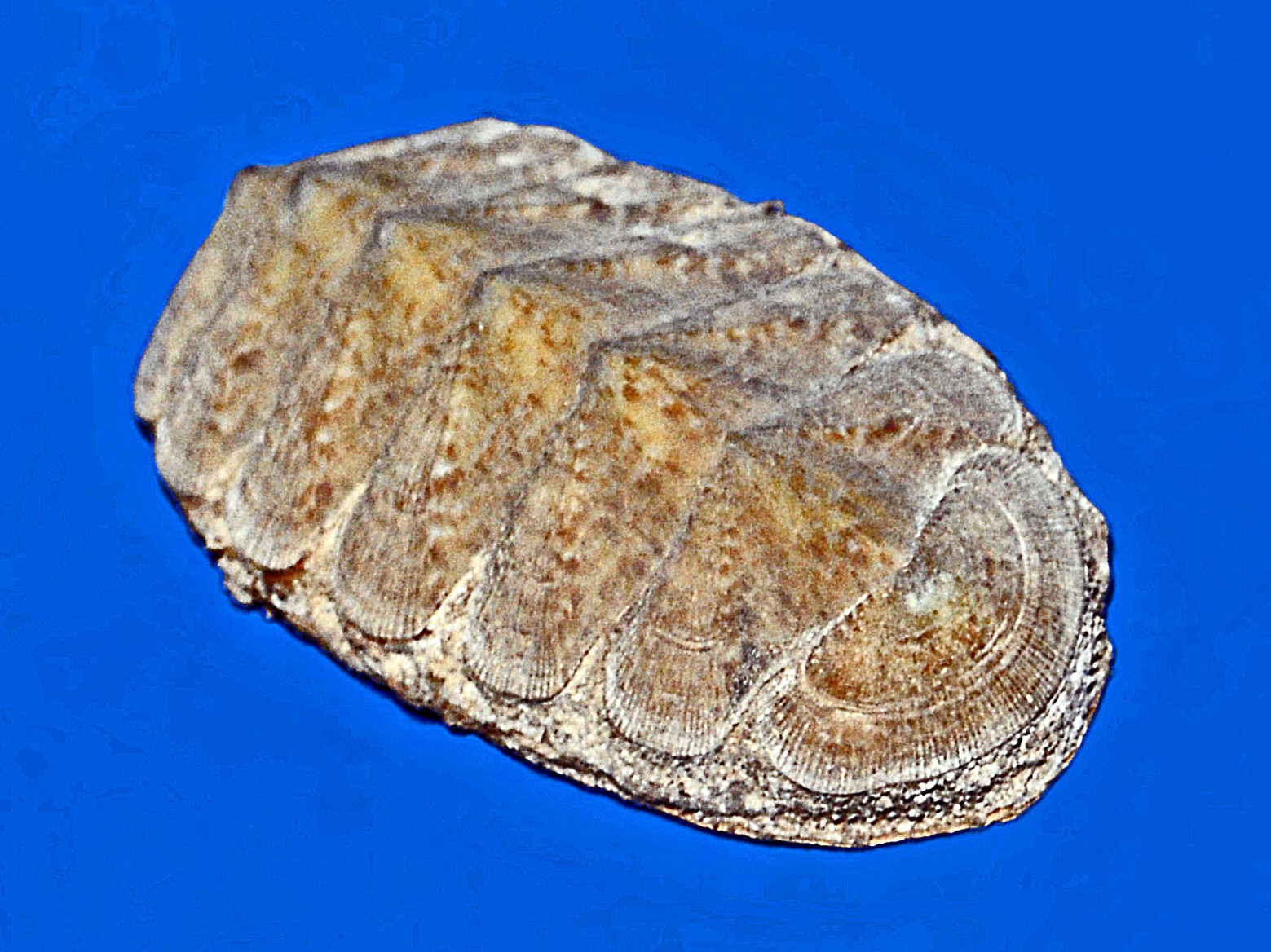
- Dorsal view of Chiton olivaceus from Sicily. Museum specimen

Scientific classification
- Domain: Eukaryota
- Kingdom: Animalia
- Phylum: Mollusca
- Class: Polyplacophora
- Order: Chitonida
- Family: Chitonidae
- Genus: Chiton
- Species: C. olivaceus

Binomial name
- Chiton olivaceus Spengler, 1797

Synonyms
- Chiton (Rhyssoplax) olivaceus Spengler, 1797; Chiton estuarii Brusina, 1870; Chiton polii Deshayes, 1835; Chiton rubellus Nardo, 1847; Chiton siculus Gray J.E., 1828; Chiton squammulosus Dollfus, 1883; Chiton striatus Brusina, 1870; Lepidopleurus sulcatus Risso, 1826

= Chiton olivaceus =

Species of mollusc

Chiton olivaceus, the green chiton, is a species of chiton, a marine polyplacophoran mollusk in the family Chitonidae, the typical chitons.

== Description ==
Chiton olivaceus can reach a length of 32–40 millimetres (1.3–1.6 in) and a width of about 16 millimetres (0.63 in). These large chitons have carinate plates with strong ribs. The shell is oblong and oval. In the front and rear plates ribs have a radial pattern. The intermediate valves show a sharp beak and rounded sutural plates. Colors are very variable, ranging from olive-gray (hence the common name) to yellow-brown, sometimes black, orange, red or yellow. The girdle surrounding all of the valves is quite large and covered by bristles and scales.

The teeth of these grazers of algae are composed of magnetite, the hardest material usable by a living being.

== Distribution ==
This species is common in the Mediterranean sea around Italy and Greece, but can also to be found in the nearby Atlantic Ocean.

== Habitat ==
Chiton olivaceus occur on a solid substrate, particularly stones and rocks, in the zones of sweeping of the waves, at a low depth.
