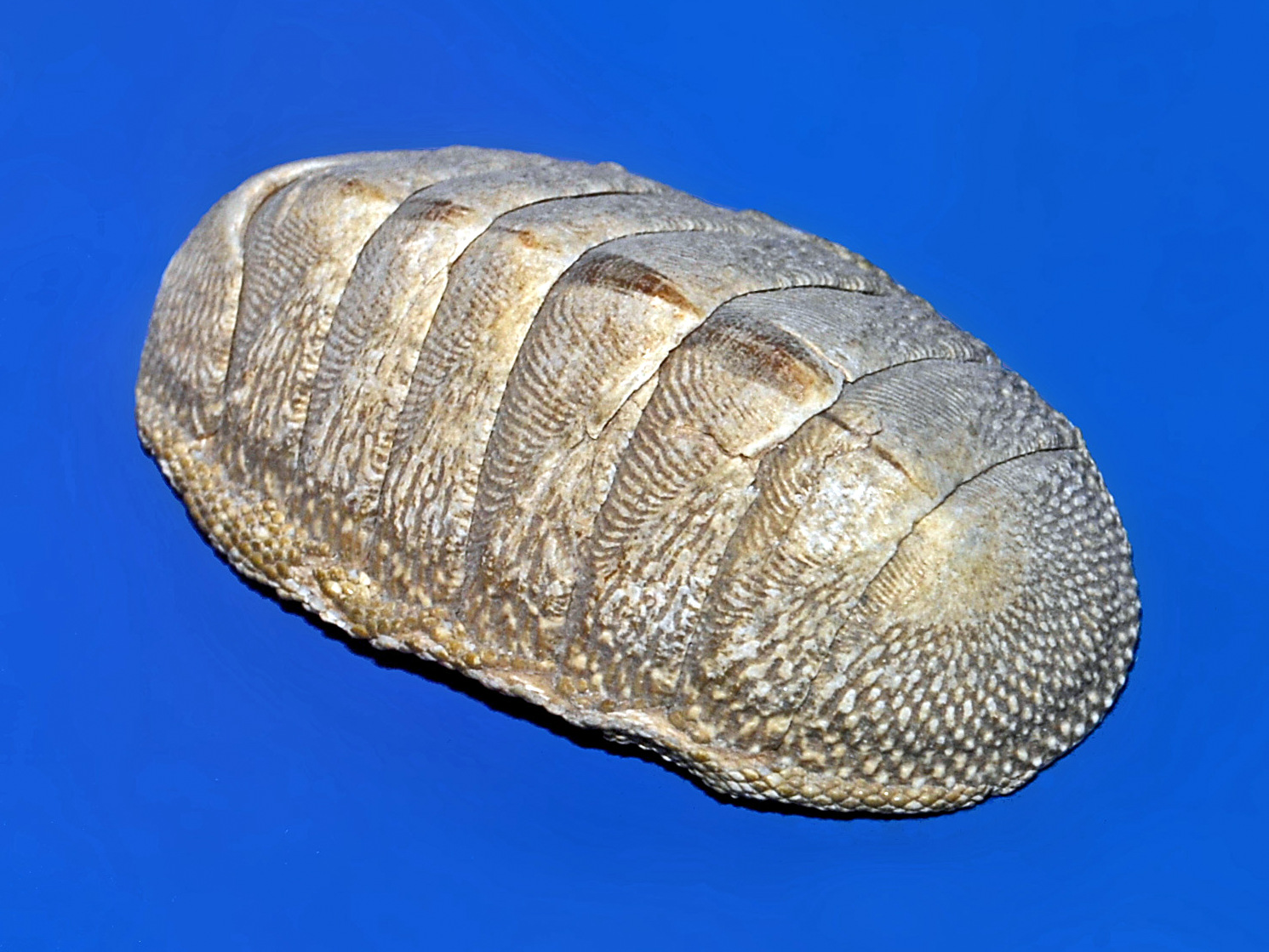
- Dorsal view of Chiton squamosus. Museum specimen

Scientific classification
- Kingdom: Animalia
- Phylum: Mollusca
- Class: Polyplacophora
- Order: Chitonida
- Family: Chitonidae
- Genus: Chiton
- Species: C. squamosus

Binomial name
- Chiton squamosus Linnaeus, 1764

= Chiton squamosus =

Species of mollusc

Chiton squamosus is a species of chiton, a marine polyplacophoran mollusk in the family Chitonidae, the typical chitons.

== Description ==
Chiton squamosus can reach a length of 50–75 mm (2.0–3.0 in). The seven valves are dull, ashen-gray with dull-brown, irregular, wide, longitudinal stripes. Girdle alternates pale stripes of grayish white and grayish green.

== Distribution and habitat ==
Chiton squamosus is present in southeastern Florida and the West Indies. These chitons occur in rocky coasts, in the zones of sweeping of the waves, at a depth of 0 – 3 meters.
