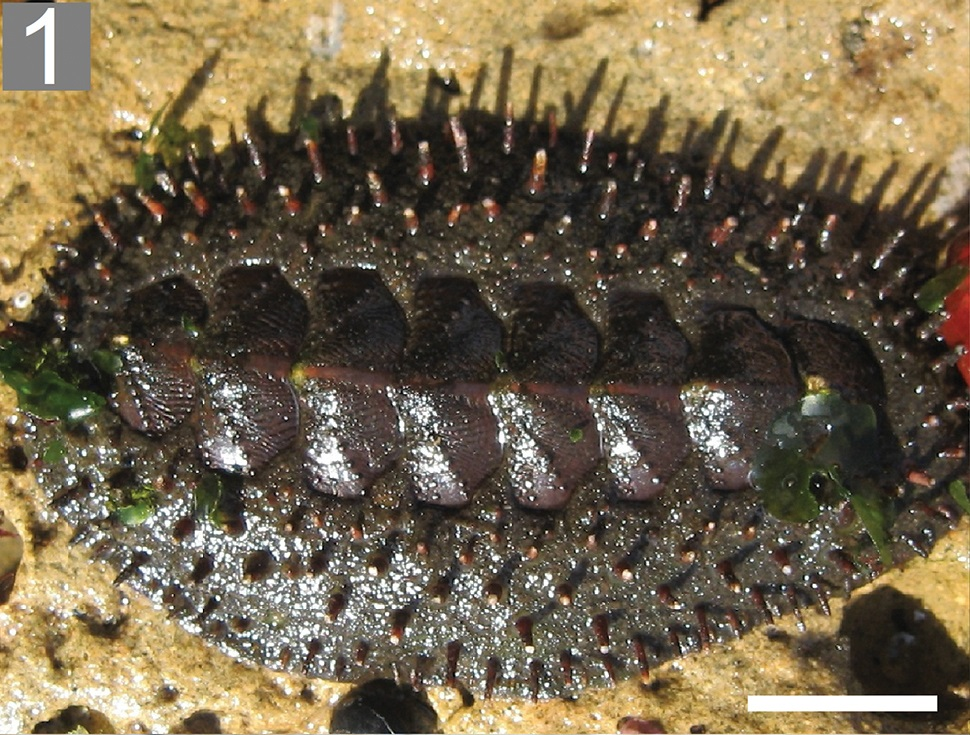
- Enoplochiton echinatus at Playa Mansa, Chile

Scientific classification
- Kingdom: Animalia
- Phylum: Mollusca
- Class: Polyplacophora
- Order: Chitonida
- Family: Chitonidae
- Subfamily: Acanthopleurinae
- Genus: Enoplochiton
- Species: E. echinatus

Binomial name
- Enoplochiton echinatus (Barnes, 1824)

Synonyms
- Acanthopleura echinata (Barnes, 1824) superseded combination; Chiton echinatus Barnes, 1824 superseded combination (original combination); Chiton spiniferus Frembly, 1827

= Enoplochiton echinatus =

Species of mollusc

Enoplochiton echinatus is a Southeast Pacific species of edible chiton, a marine polyplacophoran mollusc in the family Chitonidae, the typical chitons.

== Description ==
Enoplochiton echinatus is a very large chiton, with specimen confirmed at length of up to 23 cm (9.1 in). In Chile, the largest individuals are in the north and the smallest in the south. The species is very dark reddish-brown. The plated shell, which often is covered in epibionts like algae, Scurria limpets and Mytilus mussels, has many spines. These spines are generally up to 0.8 mm (0.03 in) long in large individuals, but can be even longer if not broken, which however is unusual. The similar-sized Enoplochiton niger of the same region lacks the spines.

== Distribution, habitat and behavior ==
The distribution of Enoplochiton echinatus ranges along the Pacific coast of South America from Concepción Province (Punta Tumbes) in Chile to Talara in Peru. Although there are old claimed records of this species from the Galápagos Islands, these are considered incorrect.

It lives at depths of 0–4 m (0–13 ft) in the intertidal and shallow subtidal zones, with the vast majority of individuals found in the lower intertidal zone. It inhabits rocky coasts in areas that often have heavy surf. Its habitat often has giant kelp Lessonia nigrescens. It is generally quite common, with average densities in appropriate habitat typically being from about 1.5 individuals per square meter to 2.5 per square meter.

The species is omnivorous, feeding on a wide range of algae and invertebrates. It has radular teeth that are quite large, allowing it to eat heavily incrusted things like coralline algae.

== Human use ==
Enoplochiton echinatus is edible and is one of the few commercially important chitons in its range, others being the somewhat smaller, up to 17.4 cm (6.9 in), dark bluish-gray Chiton magnificus and the much smaller, up to 4.5 cm (1.8 in), brownish Chiton granosus. Neither of these have large spines.
