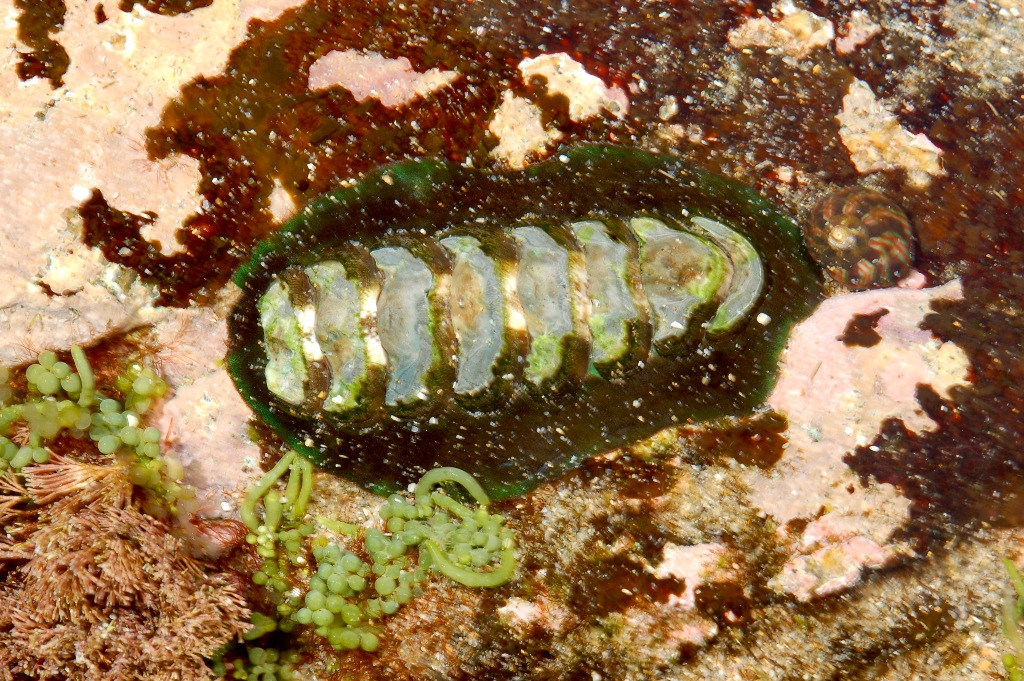

Scientific classification
- Kingdom: Animalia
- Phylum: Mollusca
- Class: Polyplacophora
- Order: Chitonida
- Family: Chitonidae
- Genus: Onithochiton
- Species: O. literatus

Binomial name
- Onithochiton literatus (Krauss, 1848)

Synonyms
- Chiton literatus Krauss, 1848

= Onithochiton literatus =

Species of mollusc

Onithochiton literatus, the black chiton, is a medium to large-sized polyplacophoran mollusc in the family Chitonidae, found on the east coast of Africa.

== Description ==
The species is usually brownish black, with valves incised with radiating wavy lines; these may be heavily eroded in older specimens. The broad and velvety girdle is brown to black and bears tiny embedded spicules. Adult size is 20–50 mm.

== Distribution and habitat ==
Onithochiton literatus occurs along the east coast of Africa, from the Cape of Good Hope to at least as far north as Somalia and possibly into the Red Sea. It is quite common and can be found along the margins of inter-tidal rock pools or more exposed on wave-washed rocks.

== Use by humans ==
In KwaZulu-Natal, the species is a common component of traditional medicines, and may also be collected as a food item in rural areas.
