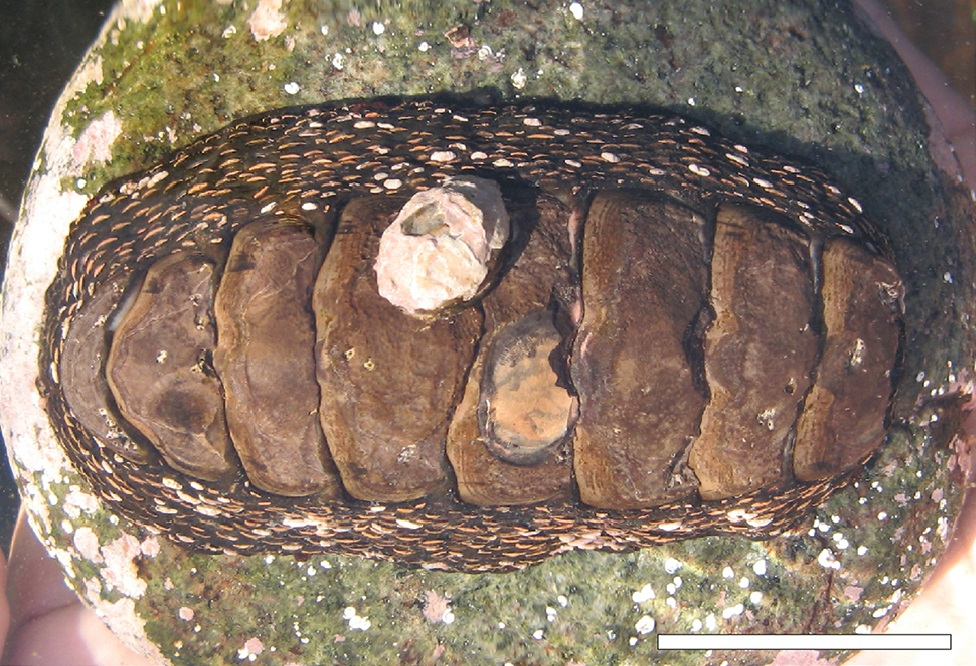
- Enoplochiton niger from Isla Playa Ramada, Chile

Scientific classification
- Kingdom: Animalia
- Phylum: Mollusca
- Class: Polyplacophora
- Order: Chitonida
- Family: Chitonidae
- Subfamily: Acanthopleurinae
- Genus: Enoplochiton; Gray, 1847
- Species: E. niger

Binomial name
- Enoplochiton niger (Barnes, 1824)

= Enoplochiton niger =

Species of mollusc

Enoplochiton niger is a Southeast Pacific species of chiton, a marine polyplacophoran mollusc in the family Chitonidae, the typical chitons.

== Description ==
With a length of up to 20 cm (7.9 in), Enoplochiton niger is a very large chiton. It is brown in color. Unlike the similar-sized Enoplochiton echinatus of the same region, Enoplochiton niger lacks large spines.

== Distribution, habitat and behavior ==
The distribution of Enoplochiton niger ranges along the Pacific coast of South America from Coquimbo in Chile to Talara in Peru. It inhabits the intertidal zone, and it is omnivorous.
