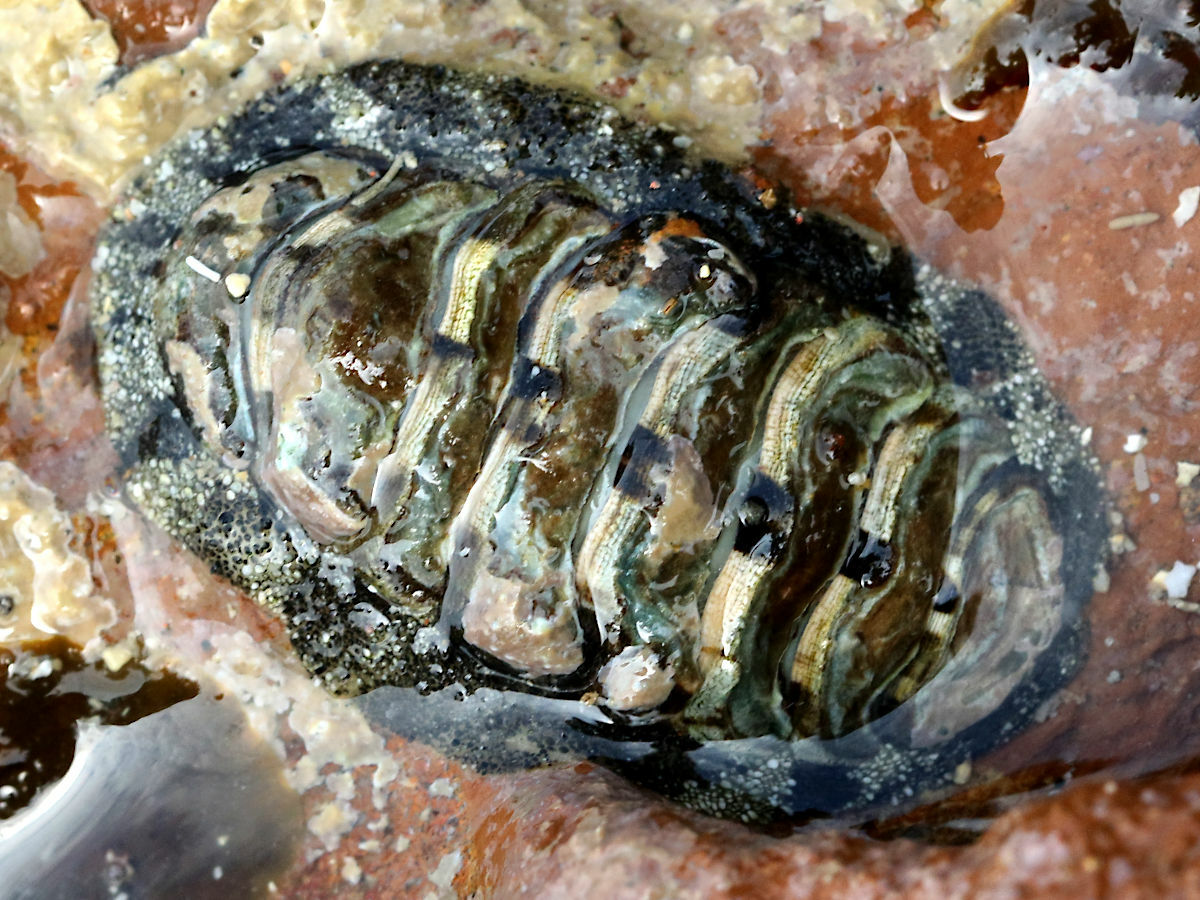

Scientific classification
- Kingdom: Animalia
- Phylum: Mollusca
- Class: Polyplacophora
- Order: Chitonida
- Family: Chitonidae
- Genus: Liolophura
- Species: L. sinensis

Binomial name
- Liolophura sinensis Choi, Park, and Hwang, 2021

= Liolophura sinensis =

Species of mollusc

Liolophura sinensis, the Chinese camelback chiton, is a species of marine mollusc in the family Chitonidae.

It is distributed along the Pacific coast of China and nearby islands such as Penghu. Its shell is composed of eight articulating plates or valves; it is usually found attached to rocks in the intertidal zone.
