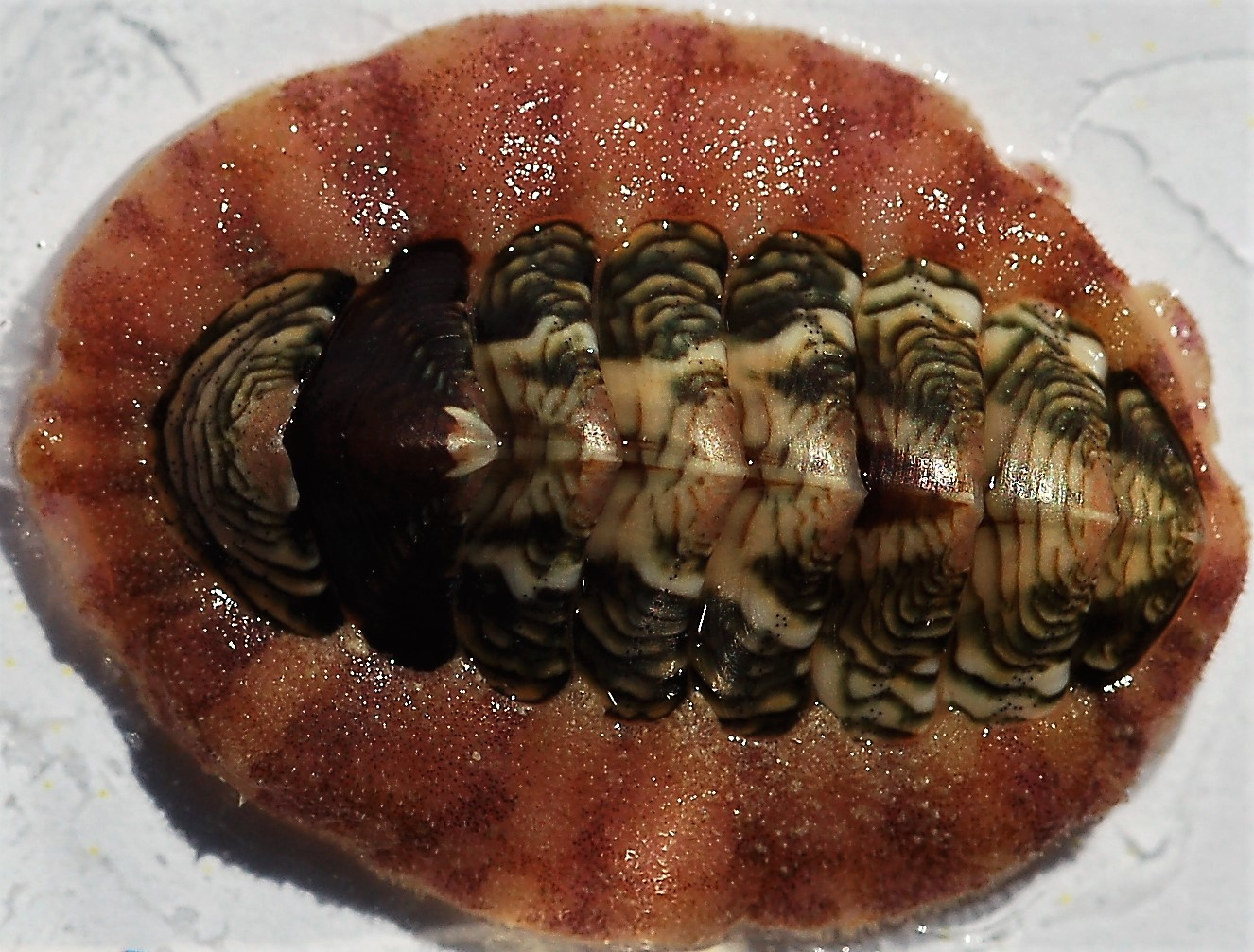

Scientific classification
- Kingdom: Animalia
- Phylum: Mollusca
- Class: Polyplacophora
- Order: Chitonida
- Family: Chitonidae
- Genus: Onithochiton
- Species: O. neglectus

Binomial name
- Onithochiton neglectus Rochebrune, 1881

Synonyms
- Chiton undulatus Quoy and Gaimard, 1835; Icoplax chathamensis Dell, 1960; Onithochiton astrolabei Rochebrune, 1881; Onithochiton decipiens Rochebrune, 1882; Onithochiton filholi Rochebrune, 1881; Onithochiton marmoratus Wissel, 1904; Onithochiton neglectus neglectus Rochebrune, 1881; Onithochiton neglectus subantarcticus Suter, 1907; Onithochiton neglectus Rochebrune, 1881; Onithochiton nodosus Suter, 1907; Onithochiton opiniosus Iredale & Hull, 1932; Onithochiton semisculptus Pilsbry, 1893; Onithochiton undulatus Suter, 1913; Onithochiton undulatus var. subantarcticus Suter, 1907

= Onithochiton neglectus =

Species of mollusc

Onithochiton neglectus is a species of chiton in the family Chitonidae.

== Description ==
Onithochito neglectus is a brooding chiton, which means that the eggs develop attached to the body of females.

== Ecology ==
Onithochito neglectus often inhabits the holdfasts of Durvillaea southern bull kelp. Genetic and shell morphological variation in the species appears to have been affected by the frequency individuals inhabiting Durvillaea holdfasts, and the population structure of O. neglectus has likely been influenced by individuals being transported within buoyant rafts of Durvillaea species.

== Distribution ==
This species is endemic to New Zealand, being mostly found at the East Coast of the North Island and the South Island.
