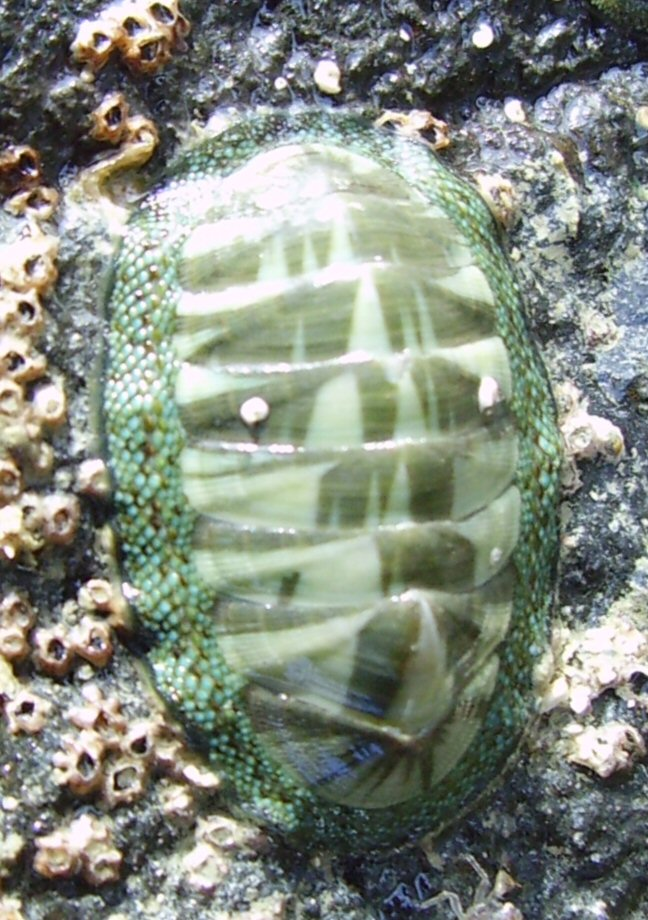

Scientific classification
- Kingdom: Animalia
- Phylum: Mollusca
- Class: Polyplacophora
- Order: Chitonida
- Family: Chitonidae
- Genus: Chiton
- Species: C. glaucus

Binomial name
- Chiton glaucus (Gray, 1828)

Synonyms
- Amaurochiton glaucus (Gray, 1828)

= Chiton glaucus =

Species of mollusc

Chiton glaucus, common name the green chiton or the blue green chiton, is a species of chiton, a marine polyplacophoran mollusk in the family Chitonidae, the typical chitons. It is the most common chiton species in New Zealand. Chiton glaucus is part of a very primitive group of mollusc with evidence of being present in up to 80 million years of the fossil record.

== Description ==
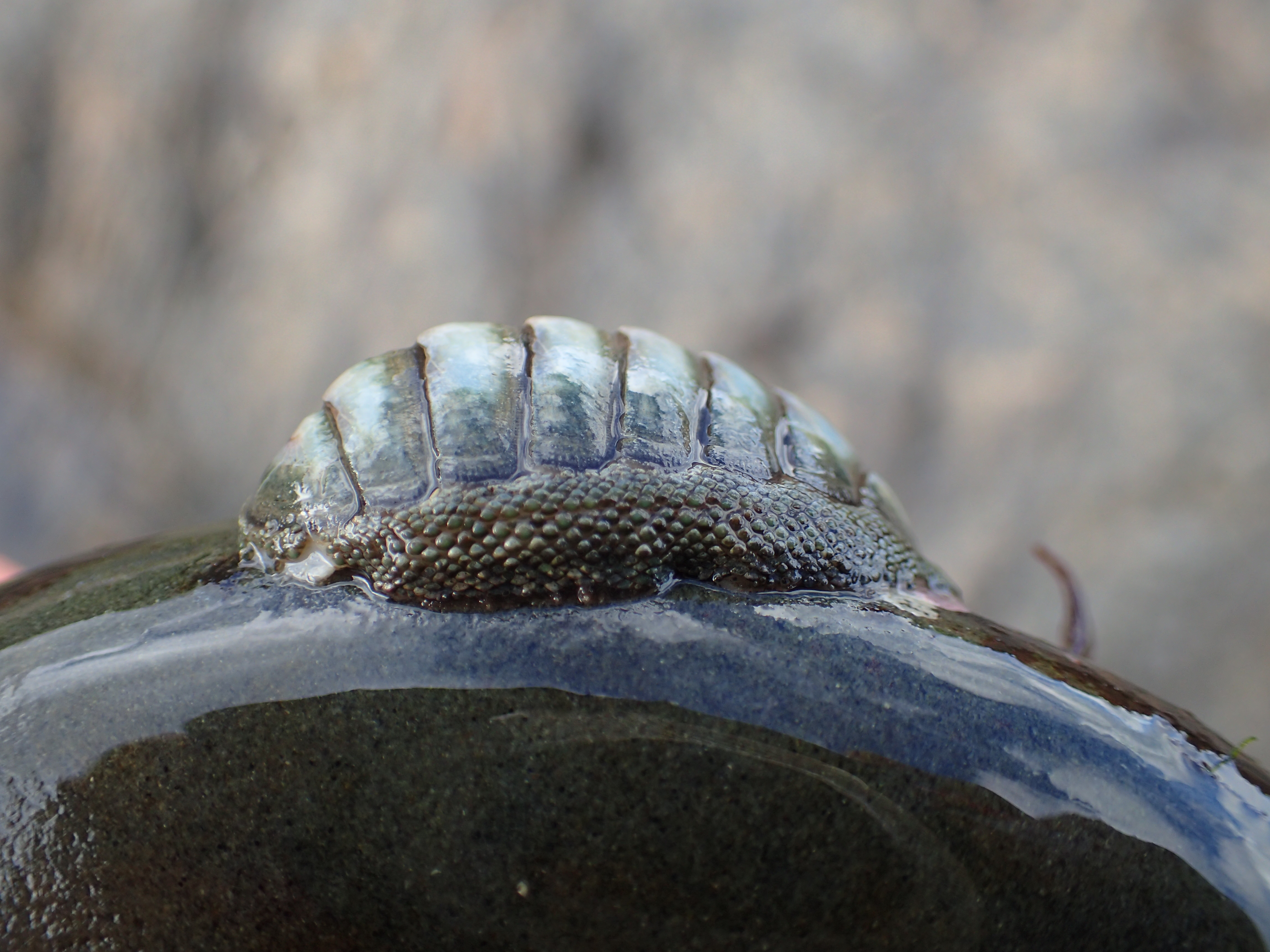
Lateral view of a live specimen

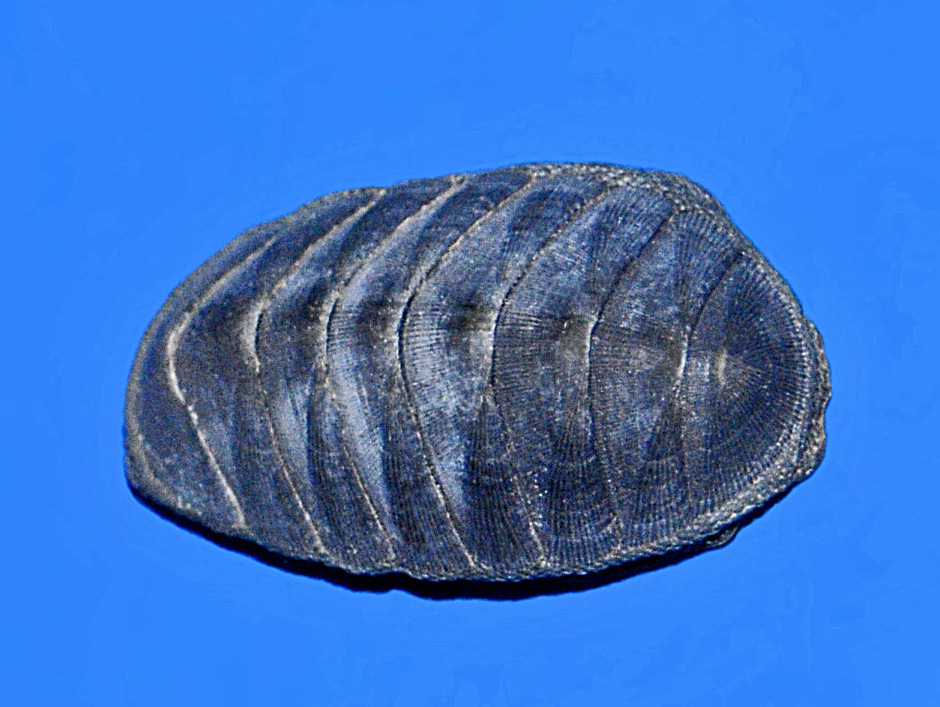
Museum specimen

Chiton glaucus are oval in shape, with a slightly elevated yet definite ridge running down the back of the organism. This results in a bilateral symmetry. The size of the organism is commonly 30–35 mm long.

Taxonomists primarily use characteristics of the valves and the girdle to tell the difference between species, and this is the case for Chiton glaucus. The shell consists of eight overlapping valves. It is fairly large, up to 55 mm in length, with 6 intermediate valves between 2 terminal valves at either end of the organism. These valves are surrounded by a girdle, which helps with adhesion to surfaces and in the case of Chiton glaucus it is covered in large scales.

The valves and girdle are generally uniform in a green colour, but individuals brown, buff and even light blue have been known to be found, especially in the North of New Zealand. Sometimes individuals present with lighter chevron or zigzag markings. Underneath the body of the chiton, there is a large foot which spans its total length. This foot is used to keep suction onto substrates. Gills are not obvious, instead being found in a set on either side of the foot. It has a small mouth at one end of the foot, which is a simple cavity.

== Distribution and habitat ==
Within New Zealand, Chiton glaucus is found on the North, South and Stewart Islands, as well as the Chatham Islands. It is also present in Tasmania, becoming very common in estuaries. It is thought to have been introduced to the area through shipping activity between Australia and New Zealand.

Chiton glaucus are found on rocky substrates with rocky tide pools forming a main portion of their habitat. Chiton glaucus are found in intertidal or subtidal zones in a broad range of environments including shores open to the elements and sheltered estuarine sites. In estuarine sites, Chiton glaucus are found under stones and bivalve shells, particularly cockle shells, as to avoid visual predators during daylight hours. This is compared to being found on stones and cobbles in more exposed areas. This chiton is able to survive in muddy areas, particularly estuaries. Surprisingly it is also able to live in areas where the substrate is semi-polluted.

== Life cycle ==
Little is known about the habits of chiton in general, but observations have been made to further understand the processes relating to spawning amongst other processes. Research conducted in Queensland on the Great Barrier Reef saw that a common chiton of this area seemed to consistently choose to spawn on the night of a full moon. This also seemed to correlate with conditions at the time as if they were not favourable, for example a rough tide, spawning would not occur and was delayed until the next full moon. This was the case even if in between full moons there was a time period where the weather and tide were favourable. Generally, the spawning of chitons are usually synchronous but not necessarily correlated with any particular stage of the lunar or solar cycle.

Chitons have separate sexes and sperm and eggs are spawned through a simple gonad near the posterior end of the foot. Chitons do not have a free swimming larval stage so distribution of the organism is not particularly vast. Once the egg has been released through the anus it moves through currents into plankton where it hatches after about two days. Next, metamorphosis occurs to promote larval settlement. The changes are not dramatic, but it does start the biomineralisation of the valves and radula present in the adult stage. After this, the prototroch and apical tuft are cast off and the shape of the organism changes from elongated to oval in outline, leaving the organism with only seven calcareous valves. A month later, the eighth valve becomes apparent and two red larval spots present themselves which are lost when the organism reaches maturity. The process then repeats if the organism reaches maturity.

== Diet ==
Chiton glaucus show clear daily patterns of activity; they remain hidden during the day to escape visual predators and then during the night they travel to the tops of the rock to feed on the algae that has grown there since the previous night.

According to research done by Robert Creese who analysed the contents in the gut of C. glaucus it was found that the main component of its diet is that of coralline algae. Other research suggests a broader range of organisms within its diet including encrusting organisms (sponges, bryozoans etc.) and on diatoms and algae in a grazing type method.

== Predators, parasites, and diseases ==
Chitons have a variety of predators both invertebrate and vertebrate including sea stars, crabs, sea snails, birds, and fish. One of the main predators of green chiton are oystercatchers. All species of New Zealand oystercatchers prey on chiton. The birds have adopted a technique where they first, strike a sharp angled blow on the shell plates and if this does not dislodge the organism, then the bird will apply pressure on the margin between the foot and the rock surface and use a scissor-like motion to release the grip. This is done until the organism is separated from the surface, and after the valves are taken off, the chiton is eaten in one piece.

Many species of chiton are susceptible to the parasite Minchinia chitonis which releases spores into all tissue types of the chiton. It is unknown how, but the parasite is able to travel through the digestive tract and be excreted to prey on other chiton individuals.

== Research ==
Recent analysis of the ultra-structural and mechanical properties of the teeth present in that of Chiton glaucus and other organisms in the class Polyplacophora, one of the seven classes of mollusks, have shown to exhibit teeth of the most hardness and stiffness of any biomaterials known to date. This translates to as much as three times as hard as human enamel and the carbonate-based shells of other mollusks. They achieve this feat through arranging a hard shell of organic incased and highly orientated magnetite rods that surround a soft core of organic rich iron phosphate in such a way that results in a tooth that is tough and wear resistant. By microscopically and spectroscopically analysing ultra structural features to figure out the structure/mechanical property relationships we can further our understanding relating to the architecture within the chiton tooth. The result of this would be wear resistant materials which could be developed for use in machines and tools, or coatings on medical implants and equipment.

Chiton living on open coastlines are brighter in colour. They have richer greens, yellows and blues, compared to those found in estuaries.
