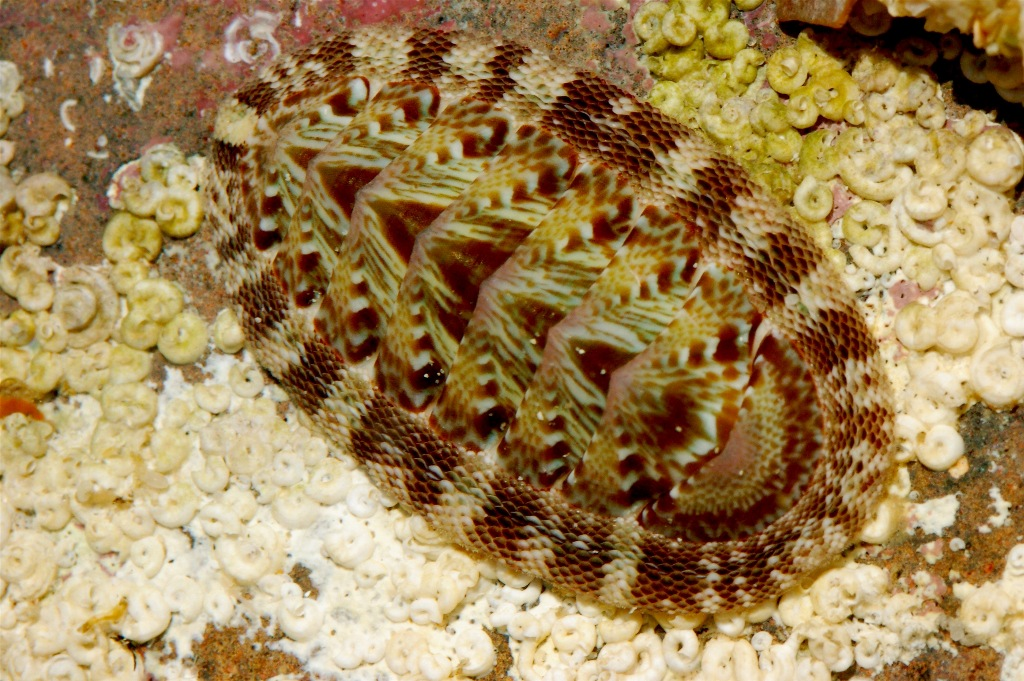

Scientific classification
- Kingdom: Animalia
- Phylum: Mollusca
- Class: Polyplacophora
- Order: Chitonida
- Family: Chitonidae
- Genus: Chiton
- Species: C. politus

Binomial name
- Chiton politus Spengler, 1797

Synonyms
- Chiton (Rhyssoplax) politus Spengler, 1797; Chiton tulipa Quoy & Gaimard, 1835 (fide Kaas & Knudsen 1992)

= Chiton politus =

Species of mollusc

Chiton politus, the tulip chiton, is a medium-sized polyplacophoran mollusc in the family Chitonidae, found on the coast of southern Africa.

== Description ==
The species can display a variety of shell patterns consisting of brown patches and zigzags on smooth pink valves. The central section of each valve often has a striped pattern. The girdle is covered with smooth, overlapping scales and also striped. Average adult length is 30–40 mm.

== Distribution and habitat ==
C. politus occurs along the south coast of Africa, from Cape Columbine in Namibia to the south coast of KwaZulu-Natal in South Africa. It is quite common and can usually be found as solitary individuals under rocks near the low tide mark. The original description by Lorenz Spengler recorded it at the Cape of Good Hope.
