= Rhyssoplax canaliculata =

Scientific classification
- Kingdom: Animalia
- Phylum: Mollusca
- Class: Polyplacophora
- Order: Chitonida
- Family: Chitonidae
- Genus: Rhyssoplax
- Species: R. canaliculata

Binomial name
- Rhyssoplax canaliculata (Quoy and Gaimard, 1835)

Synonyms
- Chiton canaliculatus Quoy and Gaimard, 1835

Species of mollusc

Rhyssoplax canaliculata is a species of chiton in the family Chitonidae.
