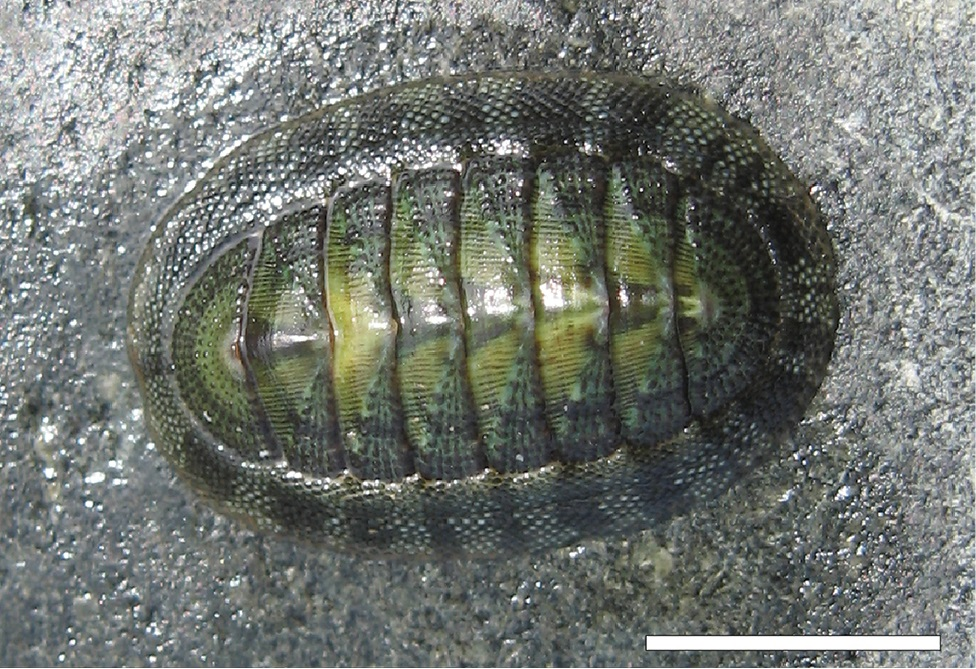
- Radsia barnesii

Scientific classification
- Domain: Eukaryota
- Kingdom: Animalia
- Phylum: Mollusca
- Class: Polyplacophora
- Order: Chitonida
- Family: Chitonidae
- Genus: Radsia; Gray, 1847

= Radsia =

Genus of molluscs

Radsia is a genus of chitons belonging to the family Chitonidae.

The species of this genus are found in Southern America and Africa.

Species:

- Radsia barnesii (Gray, 1828)
- Radsia goodallii (Broderip, 1832)
- Radsia nigrovirescens (Blainville, 1825)
- Radsia sulcatus (Wood, 1815)
