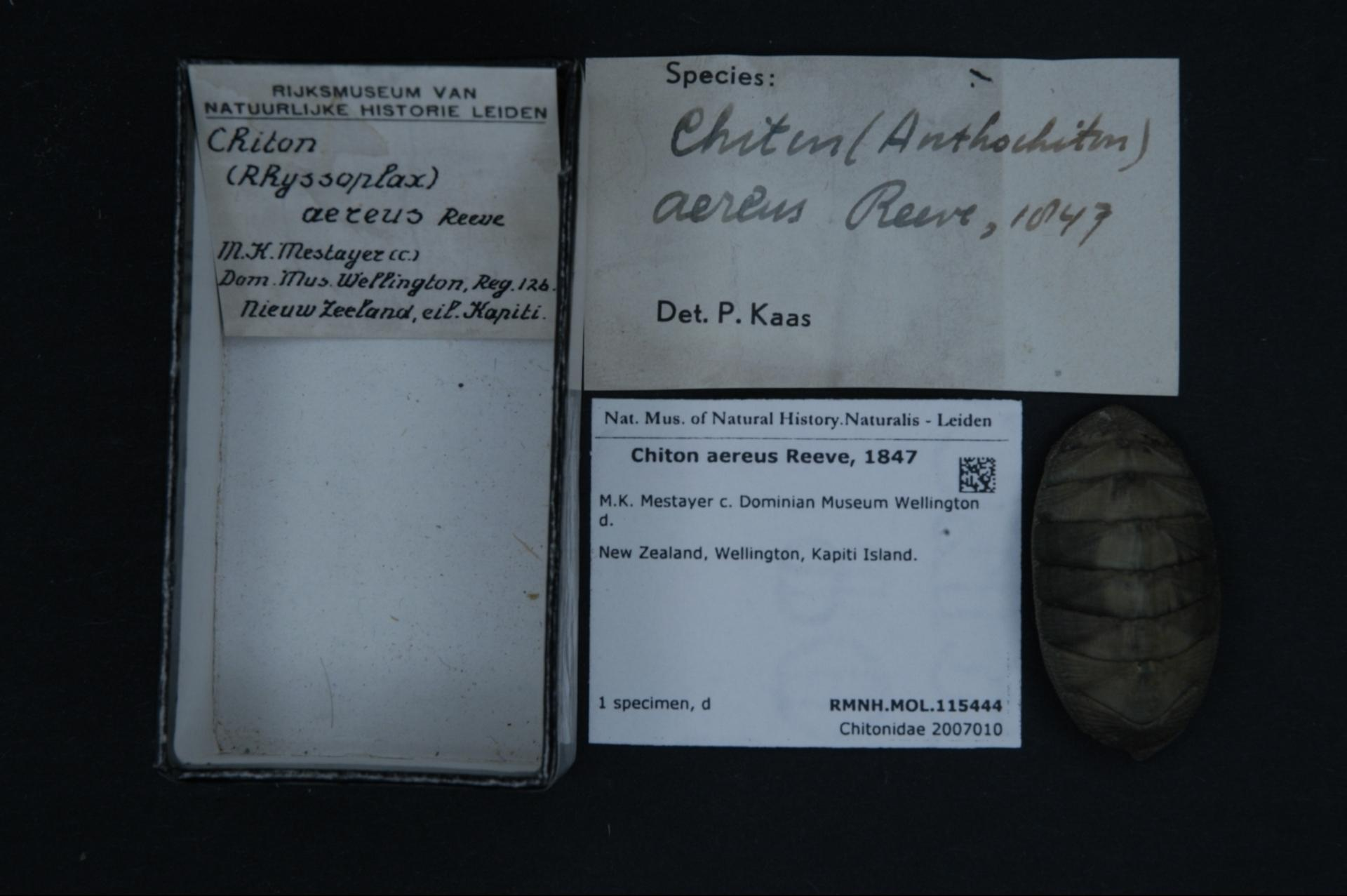

Scientific classification
- Kingdom: Animalia
- Phylum: Mollusca
- Class: Polyplacophora
- Order: Chitonida
- Family: Chitonidae
- Genus: Rhyssoplax
- Species: R. aerea

Binomial name
- Rhyssoplax aerea (Reeve, 1847)

Synonyms
- Chiton (Rhyssoplax) aereus Reeve, 1847; Chiton aereus Reeve, 1847; Chiton clavatus Suter, 1907; Chiton huttoni Suter, 1906; Chiton siculoides E. A. Smith, 1891; Chiton suteri Iredale, 1910; Gymnoplax alphonsinae Rochebrune, 1884; Rhyssoplax oliveri Mestayer, 1921

= Rhyssoplax aerea =

Species of mollusc

Rhyssoplax aerea is a species of chiton in the family Chitonidae.
