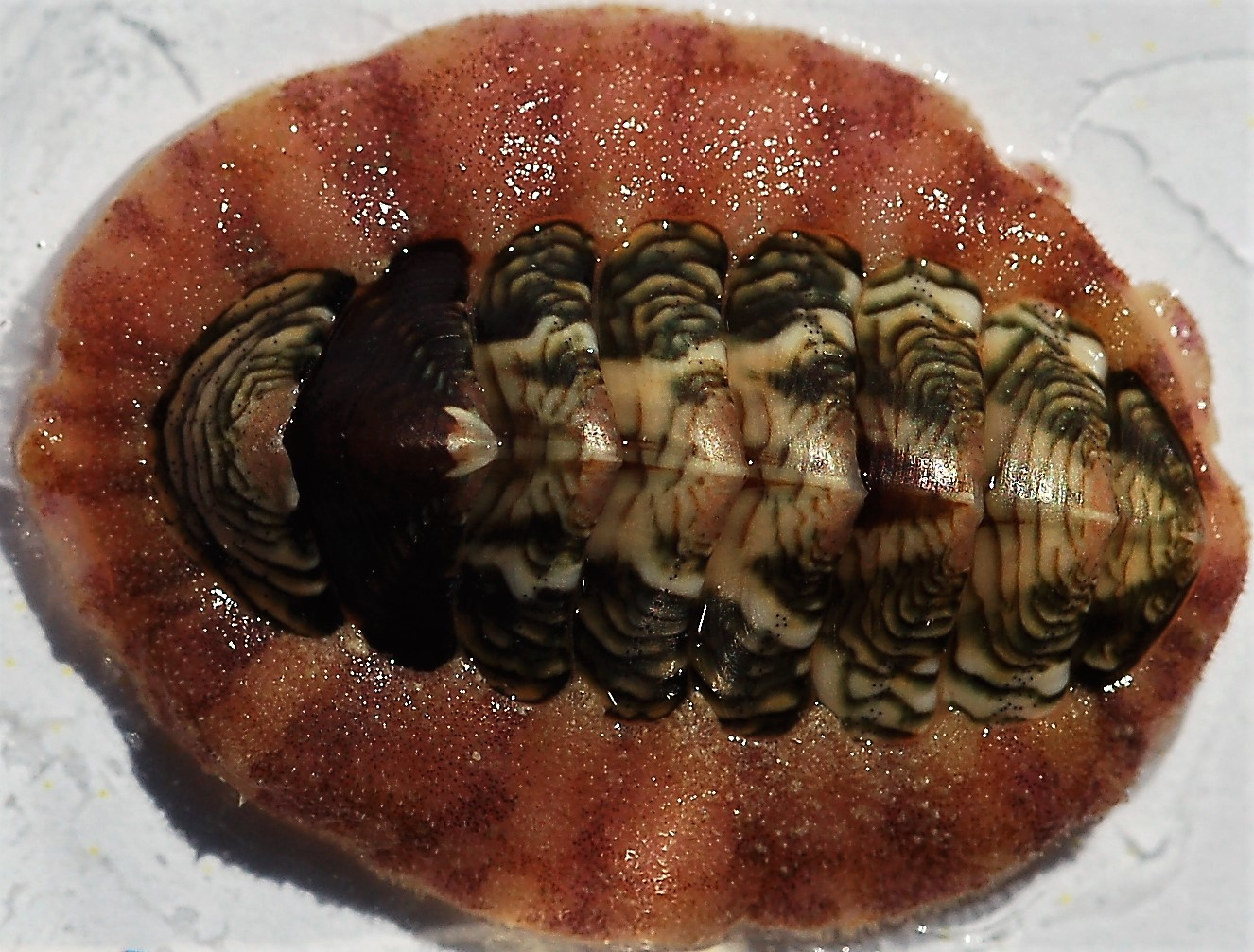
- Onithochiton neglectus collected in Russell, New Zealand

Scientific classification
- Kingdom: Animalia
- Phylum: Mollusca
- Class: Polyplacophora
- Order: Chitonida
- Family: Chitonidae
- Genus: Onithochiton; Cecalupo & Perugia, 2012

Type species
- Chiton undulatus Quoy and Gaimard, 1835

Species
- See text

Synonyms
- Nodiplax Beu, 1967; Onithella Mackay, 1933; Onithoplax Thiele, 1909; Onitochiton Rochebrune, 1884 (Spelling variation); Pristochiton Clessin, 1904; Tonicia (Onithoplax) Thiele, 1909

= Onithochiton =

Genus of chitons

Onithochiton is a genus of chitons in the subfamily Toniciinae of the family Chitonidae, which is distributed from Australia and New Zealand to South Africa.

== Species ==
- Onithochiton ashbyi Bednall & Matthews, 1906
- Onithochiton discrepans Hedley & Hull, 1912
- Onithochiton erythraeus Thiele, 1909
- Onithochiton gotoi Van Belle, 1993
- Onithochiton helenae (Mackay, 1933)
- Onithochiton hirasei Pilsbry, 1901
- Onithochiton literatus (Krauss, 1848)
- Onithochiton lyellii (G.B. Sowerby I in Broderip & Sowerby, 1832)
- Onithochiton maillardi (Deshayes, 1863)
- Onithochiton maklayi Sirenko, 2019
- Onithochiton margueritae Kaas, Van Belle & Strack, 2006
- Onithochiton neglectus Rochebrune, 1881
- Onithochiton noemiae (Rochebrune, 1884)
- Onithochiton oliveri Iredale, 1914
- Onithochiton quercinus (Gould, 1846)
- Onithochiton rugulosus Angas, 1867
- Onithochiton semisculptus Pilsbry, 1893 (synonym of Onithochiton neglectus Rochebrune, 1881)
- Onithochiton societatis Thiele, 1909
- Onithochiton stracki Sirenko, 2012
- Onithochiton vandingeneni Dell'Angelo, Landau, Sosso & Taviani, 2020

Species brought into synonymy

- Onithochiton astrolabei Rochebrune, 1881: synonym of Onithochiton neglectus Rochebrune, 1881
- Onithochiton caliginosus Pilsbry, 1893: synonym of Liolophura japonica (Lischke, 1873)
- Onithochiton decipiens Rochebrune, 1882: synonym of Onithochiton neglectus Rochebrune, 1881
- Onithochiton filholi Rochebrune, 1881: synonym of Onithochiton neglectus Rochebrune, 1881
- Onithochiton isipingoensis Sykes, 1901: synonym of Craspedochiton isipingoensis (Sykes, 1901) (original combination)
- Onithochiton lyelli G.B. Sowerby I, 1832: synonym of Onithochiton maillardi (Deshayes, 1863) (misinterpretation according to Kaas et al. 2006)
- Onithochiton margaritiferum Rochebrune, 1883: synonym of Calloplax janeirensis (Gray, 1828): synonym of Rhyssoplax janeirensis (Gray, 1828)
- Onithochiton marmoratus Wissel, 1904: synonym of Onithochiton neglectus Rochebrune, 1881
- Onithochiton nodosus Suter, 1907: synonym of Onithochiton neglectus Rochebrune, 1881
- Onithochiton opiniosus Iredale & Hull, 1932: synonym of Onithochiton neglectus Rochebrune, 1881
- Onithochiton pruinosum Rochebrune, 1884: synonym of Stenoplax purpurascens (C. B. Adams, 1845)
- Onithochiton rugulosus Angas, 1867: synonym of Onithochiton quercinus (Gould, 1846)
- Onithochiton scholvieni Thiele, 1909: synonym of Onithochiton quercinus (Gould, 1846)
- Onithochiton semisculptus Pilsbry, 1893: synonym of Onithochiton neglectus Rochebrune, 1881
- Onithochiton undulatus (G. B. Sowerby I, 1839): synonym of Onithochiton neglectus Rochebrune, 1881
- Onithochiton wahlbergi (Krauss, 1848): synonym of Onithochiton literatus (F. Krauss, 1848)
