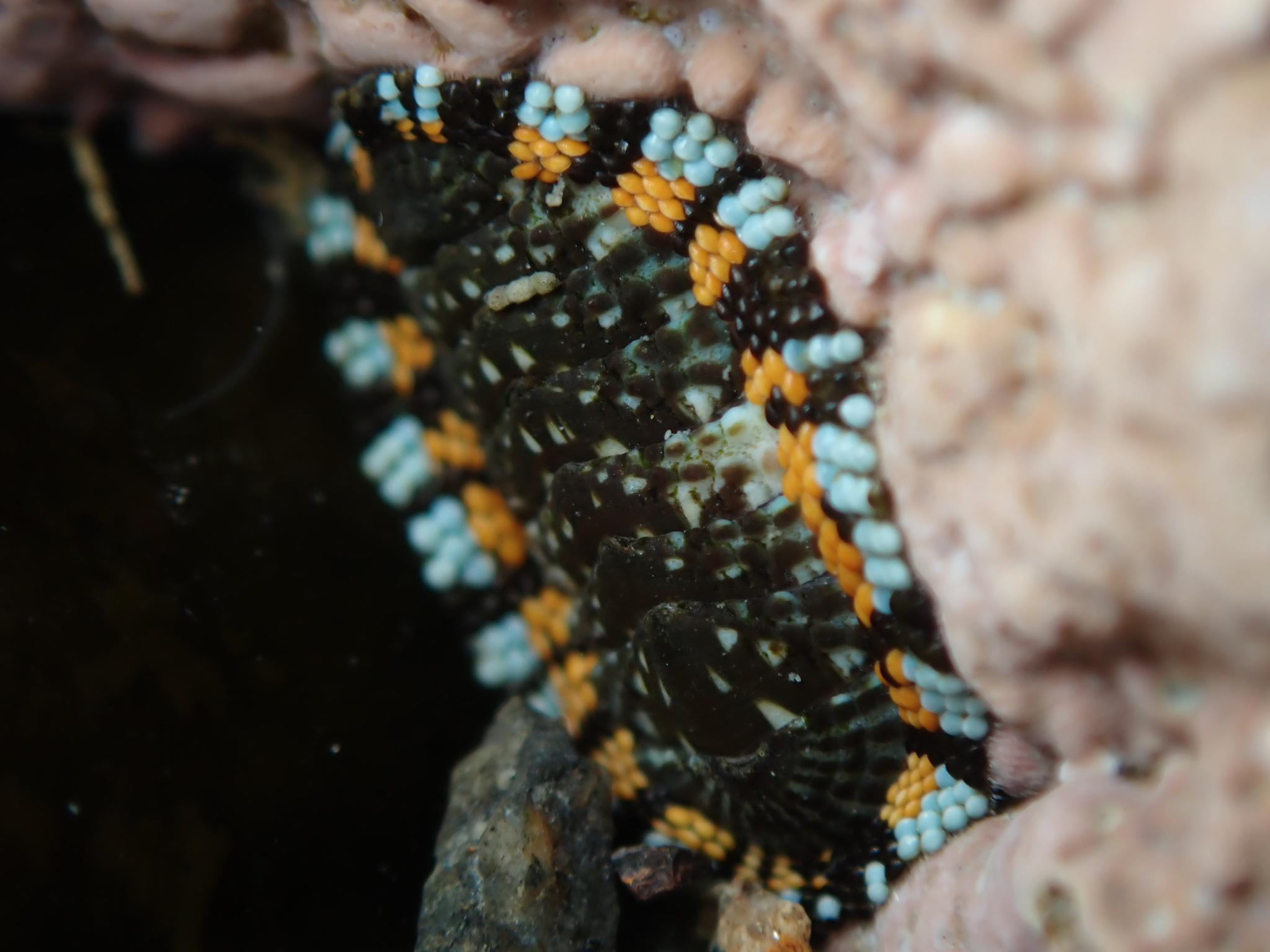

Scientific classification
- Kingdom: Animalia
- Phylum: Mollusca
- Class: Polyplacophora
- Order: Chitonida
- Family: Chitonidae
- Genus: Sypharochiton
- Species: S. sinclairi

Binomial name
- Sypharochiton sinclairi (Gray, 1843)

Synonyms
- Chiton sinclairi Gray, 1843

= Sypharochiton sinclairi =

Species of mollusc

Sypharochiton sinclairi is a species of chiton in the family Chitonidae.

== Distribution ==
New Zealand
