= Mucrosquama =

Scientific classification
- Kingdom: Animalia
- Phylum: Mollusca
- Class: Polyplacophora
- Order: Chitonida
- Family: Chitonidae
- Subfamily: Chitoninae
- Genus: Mucrosquama; Iredale & Hull, 1926

Type species
- Mucrosquama carnosus (Angas, 1867)

Genus of molluscs

Mucrosquama is a genus of chitons, a polyplacophoran mollusc in the family Chitonidae, first described in 1926 by Tom Iredale and Arthur Francis Basset Hull. The type species is Mucrosquama carnosus first described as Chiton carnosus by Angas in 1867.

There are two species in this genus:

- Mucrosquama carnosa (Angas, 1867)
- Mucrosquama verconis (Torr & Ashby, 1898)

Two further species have been named but are synonymised with those above.

- Mucrosquama nielseni Cotton & Weeding, 1939 accepted as Mucrosquama carnosa (Angas, 1867)
- Mucrosquama sheardi Cotton & Weeding, 1939 accepted as Mucrosquama verconis (Torr & Ashby, 1898)
