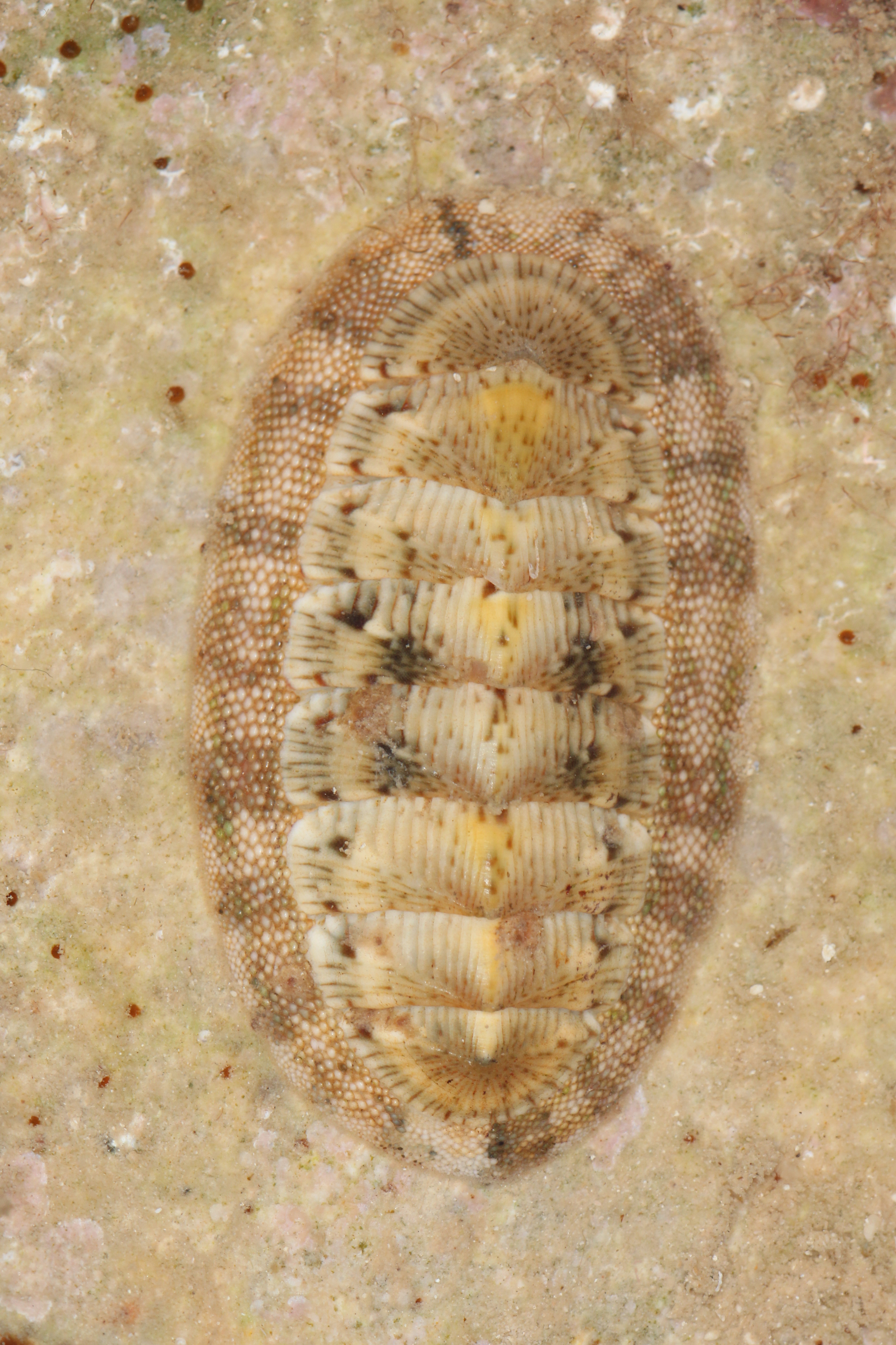
- Rhyssoplax olivacea

Scientific classification
- Kingdom: Animalia
- Phylum: Mollusca
- Class: Polyplacophora
- Order: Chitonida
- Family: Chitonidae
- Subfamily: Chitoninae
- Genus: Rhyssoplax; Thiele, 1893

Type species
- Chiton affinis Issel, 1869

Species
- See text

Synonyms
- Anthochiton Thiele, 1893; Chiton (Anthochiton) Thiele, 1893; Chiton (Clathropleura) Tiberi, 1877; Chiton (Rhyssoplax) Thiele, 1893; Georgus Thiele, 1893

= Rhyssoplax =

Genus of molluscs

Rhyssoplax is a genus of chitons in the family Chitonidae, endemic to Australia, New Zealand, New Caledonia, Norfolk Island, and the Kermadec Islands.

== Species ==
The following species are recognised in the genus Rhyssoplax:

- Rhyssoplax aerea (Reeve, 1847)
- Rhyssoplax affinis (Issel, 1869)
- †Rhyssoplax allanthomsoni Mestayer, 1929
- †Rhyssoplax assurecta Dell'Angelo, Landau, Van Dingenen & Ceulemans, 2018
- Rhyssoplax baliensis Bullock, 1989
- Rhyssoplax barnardi (Ashby, 1931)
- Rhyssoplax bednalli (Pilsbry, 1895)
- Rhyssoplax bullocki Sirenko, 2012
- Rhyssoplax burmana (P. P. Carpenter, 1893)
- Rhyssoplax calliozona (Pilsbry, 1894)
- Rhyssoplax canaliculata (Quoy & Gaimard, 1835)
- Rhyssoplax canariensis (A. d'Orbigny, 1840)
- Rhyssoplax corallina (Risso, 1826)
- Rhyssoplax coryphea (Hedley & Hull, 1912)
- Rhyssoplax coxi (Pilsbry, 1894)
- Rhyssoplax crawfordi (Sykes, 1899)
- Rhyssoplax densilirata (P. P. Carpenter, 1893)
- Rhyssoplax diaphora Iredale & May, 1916
- Rhyssoplax discolor (Souverbie, 1866)
- †Rhyssoplax duodeni (Ashby & Cotton, 1939)
- Rhyssoplax ectypa (Rochebrune, 1884)
- Rhyssoplax exasperata Iredale, 1914
- Rhyssoplax exoptanda (Bednall, 1897)
- †Rhyssoplax fossicius (Ashby & Torr, 1901)
- Rhyssoplax fosteri (Bullock, 1972)
- Rhyssoplax funerea (Hedley & Hull, 1912)
- Rhyssoplax heterodon (Pilsbry, 1893)
- Rhyssoplax jugosa (A. Gould, 1846)
- Rhyssoplax kimberi (Ashby, 1928)
- Rhyssoplax komaiana (Is. Taki & Iw. Taki, 1929)
- Rhyssoplax kurodai (Is. Taki & Iw. Taki, 1929)
- Rhyssoplax linsleyi Burghardt, 1973
- †Rhyssoplax macdonaldensis (Ashby & Cotton, 1939)
- Rhyssoplax maldivensis (E. A. Smith, 1903)
- Rhyssoplax mauritiana (Quoy & Gaimard, 1835)
- †Rhyssoplax octocostata (Ashby & Cotton, 1939)
- Rhyssoplax olivacea (Spengler, 1797)
- Rhyssoplax orukta (Maughan, 1900)
- Rhyssoplax peregrina (Thiele, 1909)
- Rhyssoplax perviridis (P. P. Carpenter, 1865)
- Rhyssoplax phaseolina (Monterosato, 1879)
- Rhyssoplax polita (Spengler, 1797)
- Rhyssoplax pulcherrima (G. B. Sowerby II, 1842)
- Rhyssoplax pulvinata (P. P. Carpenter, 1893)
- Rhyssoplax rapaitiensis (Schwabe & Lozouet, 2006)
- †Rhyssoplax relata (Ashby & Cotton, 1936)
- Rhyssoplax rhynchota (Rochebrune, 1884)
- Rhyssoplax salihafui (Bullock, 1972)
- Rhyssoplax speciosa (Nierstrasz, 1905)
- Rhyssoplax stangeri (Reeve, 1847)
- Rhyssoplax subassimilis (Souverbie, 1866)
- Rhyssoplax tectiformis Is. Taki, 1938
- Rhyssoplax torriana (Hedley & Hull, 1910)
- Rhyssoplax translucens (Hedley & Hull, 1912)
- Rhyssoplax tricostalis (Pilsbry, 1894)
- Rhyssoplax vauclusensis (Hedley & Hull, 1912)
- Rhyssoplax venusta Hull, 1923
- Rhyssoplax whitleyi Iredale & Hull, 1932
