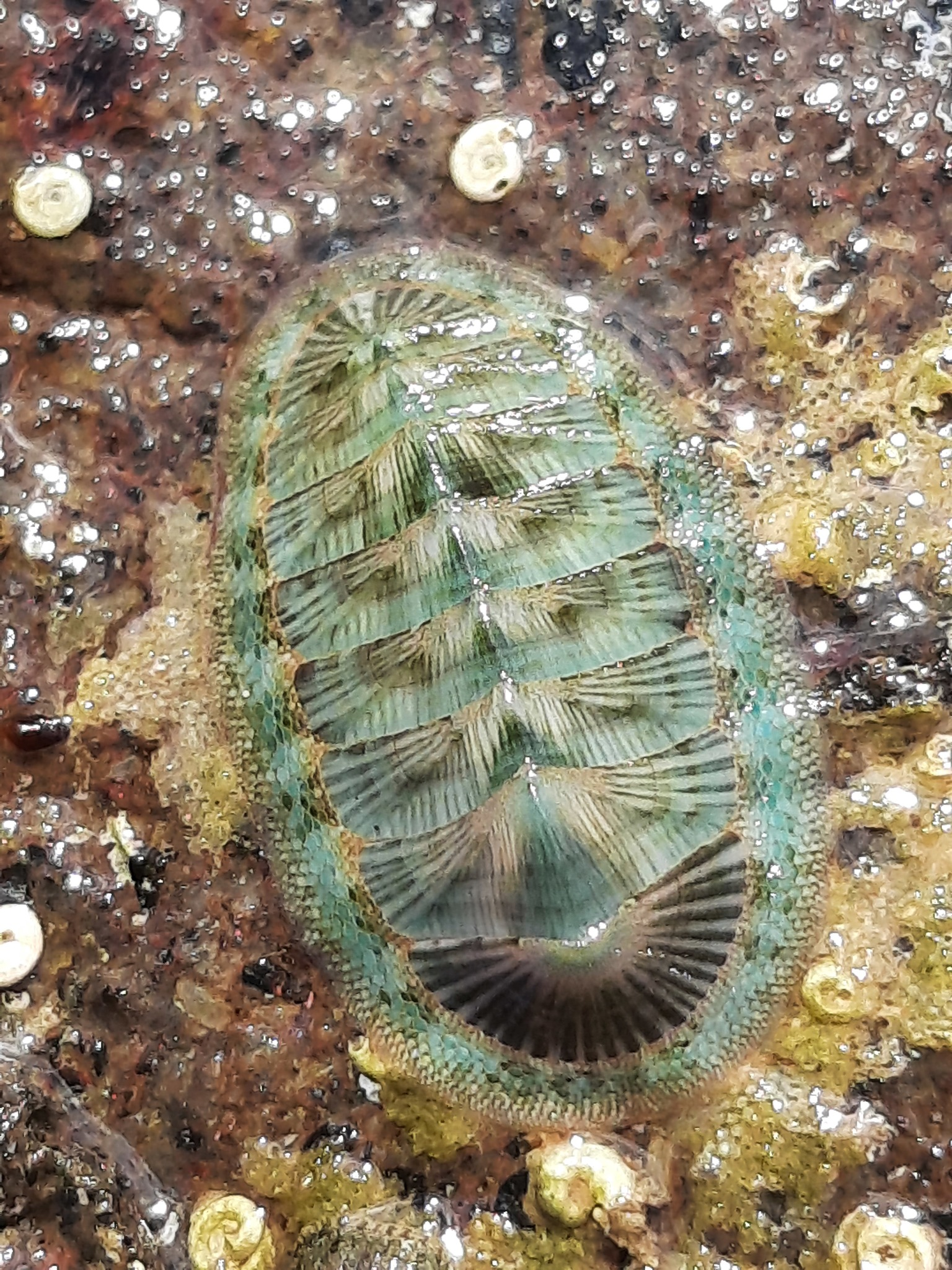

Scientific classification
- Kingdom: Animalia
- Phylum: Mollusca
- Class: Polyplacophora
- Order: Chitonida
- Family: Chitonidae
- Genus: Rhyssoplax
- Species: R. stangeri

Binomial name
- Rhyssoplax stangeri (Reeve, 1847)

Synonyms
- Chiton stangeri Reeve, 1847

= Rhyssoplax stangeri =

Species of mollusc

Rhyssoplax stangeri is a species of chiton in the family Chitonidae.
