= Enoplochiton =

Scientific classification
- Kingdom: Animalia
- Phylum: Mollusca
- Class: Polyplacophora
- Order: Chitonida
- Suborder: Chitonina
- Family: Chitonidae
- Subfamily: Acanthopleurinae
- Genus: Enoplochiton; J. E. Gray, 1847

Type species
- Chiton niger Barnes, 1824

Genus of molluscs

Enoplochiton is a genus of chitons in the family Chitonidae.

== Species ==
- Enoplochiton echinatus (Barnes, 1824)
- Enoplochiton niger (Barnes, 1824)
- † Enoplochiton rochebrunei Cossmann, 1888

Synonyms

- Enoplochiton torri Bastow & Gatliff, 1907: synonym of Squamopleura curtisiana (E. A. Smith, 1884) (junior subjective synonym)
