= Sypharochiton torri =

Scientific classification
- Kingdom: Animalia
- Phylum: Mollusca
- Class: Polyplacophora
- Order: Chitonida
- Family: Chitonidae
- Genus: Sypharochiton
- Species: S. torri

Binomial name
- Sypharochiton torri (Suter, 1907)

Synonyms
- Chiton torri Suter, 1907

Species of mollusc

Sypharochiton torri is a species of chiton in the family Chitonidae found in New Zealand.
