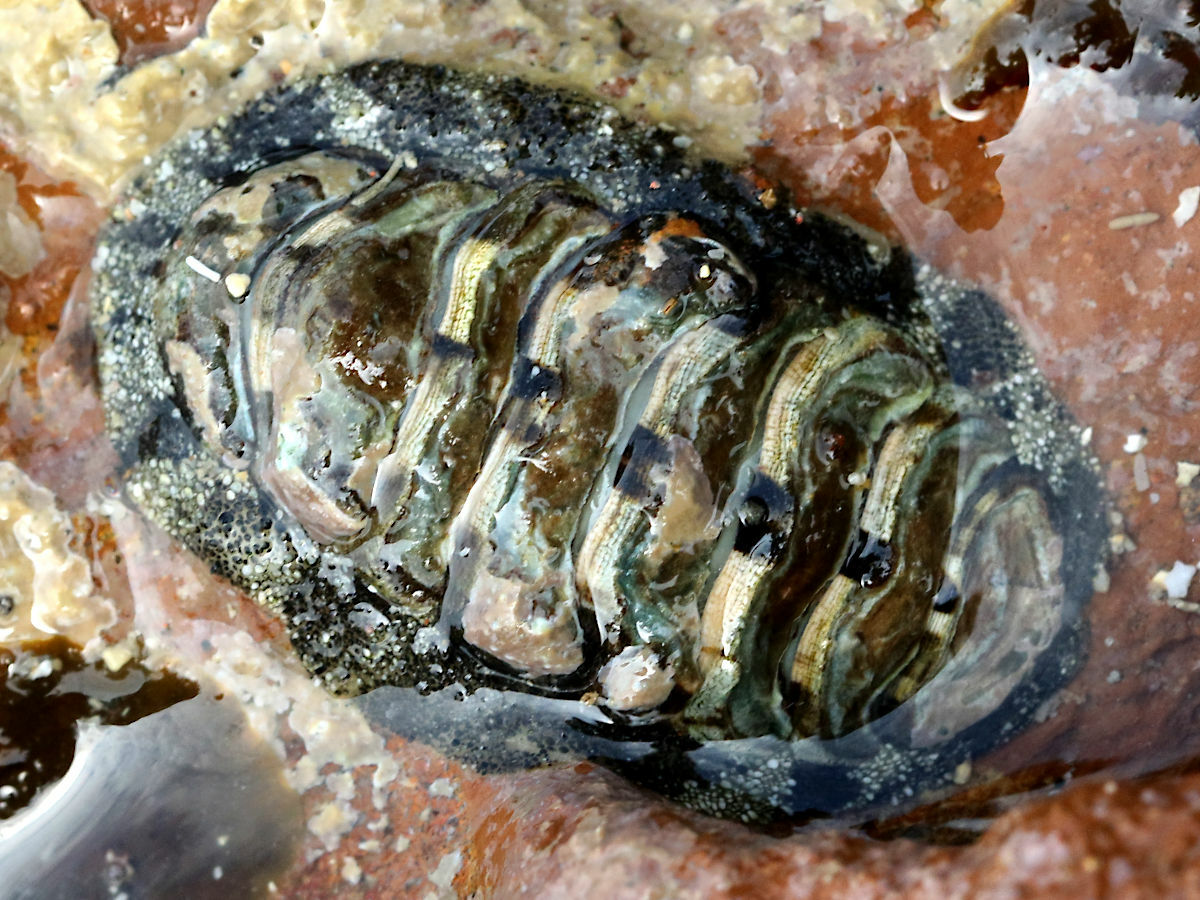
- L. sinensis

Scientific classification
- Kingdom: Animalia
- Phylum: Mollusca
- Class: Polyplacophora
- Order: Chitonida
- Family: Chitonidae
- Subfamily: Acanthopleurinae
- Genus: Liolophura; Pilsbry, 1893

= Liolophura =

Genus of molluscs

Liolophura is a genus of chitons, or polyplacophorans, marine mollusks whose shell is composed of eight articulating plates or valves.

== Taxonomy ==
Liolophura is classified within the family Chitonidae, subfamily Acanthopleurinae. Species include:

- Liolophura arenosa (Ferreira, 1986)
- Liolophura gaimardi (Blainville, 1825)
- Liolophura hirtosa (Péron MS, Blainville, 1825)
- Liolophura japonica (Lischke, 1873)
- Liolophura koreana Yeo and Hwang, 2021
- Liolophura rehderi (Ferreira, 1986)
- Liolophura sinensis Choi, Park, and Hwang, 2021
