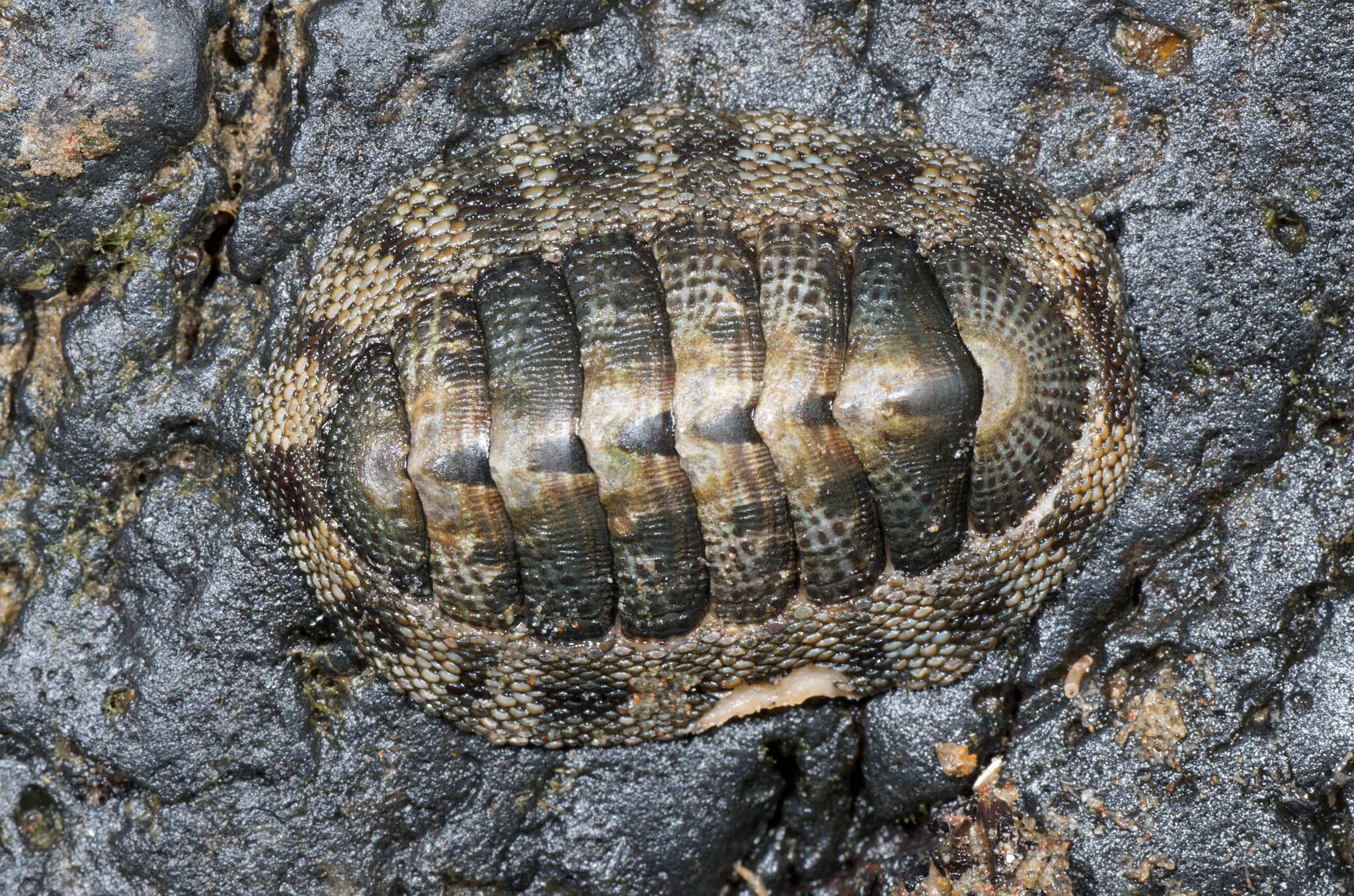
- Sypharochiton pelliserpentis

Scientific classification
- Kingdom: Animalia
- Phylum: Mollusca
- Class: Polyplacophora
- Order: Chitonida
- Family: Chitonidae
- Genus: Sypharochiton; Thiele, 1893

Type species
- Chiton pelliserpentis Quoy and Gaimard, 1835

Species
- See text

= Sypharochiton =

Genus of molluscs

Sypharochiton is a genus of chitons in the family Chitonidae. Most species are endemic to the waters of New Zealand, except for Sypharochiton pelliserpentis which is found in both New Zealand and south-eastern Australia.

== Species ==
- Sypharochiton aorangi (Creese & O'Neill, 1987)
- Sypharochiton pelliserpentis (Quoy and Gaimard, 1835)
- Sypharochiton sinclairi (Gray, 1843)
- Sypharochiton themeropis Iredale, 1914
- Sypharochiton torri (Suter, 1907)
