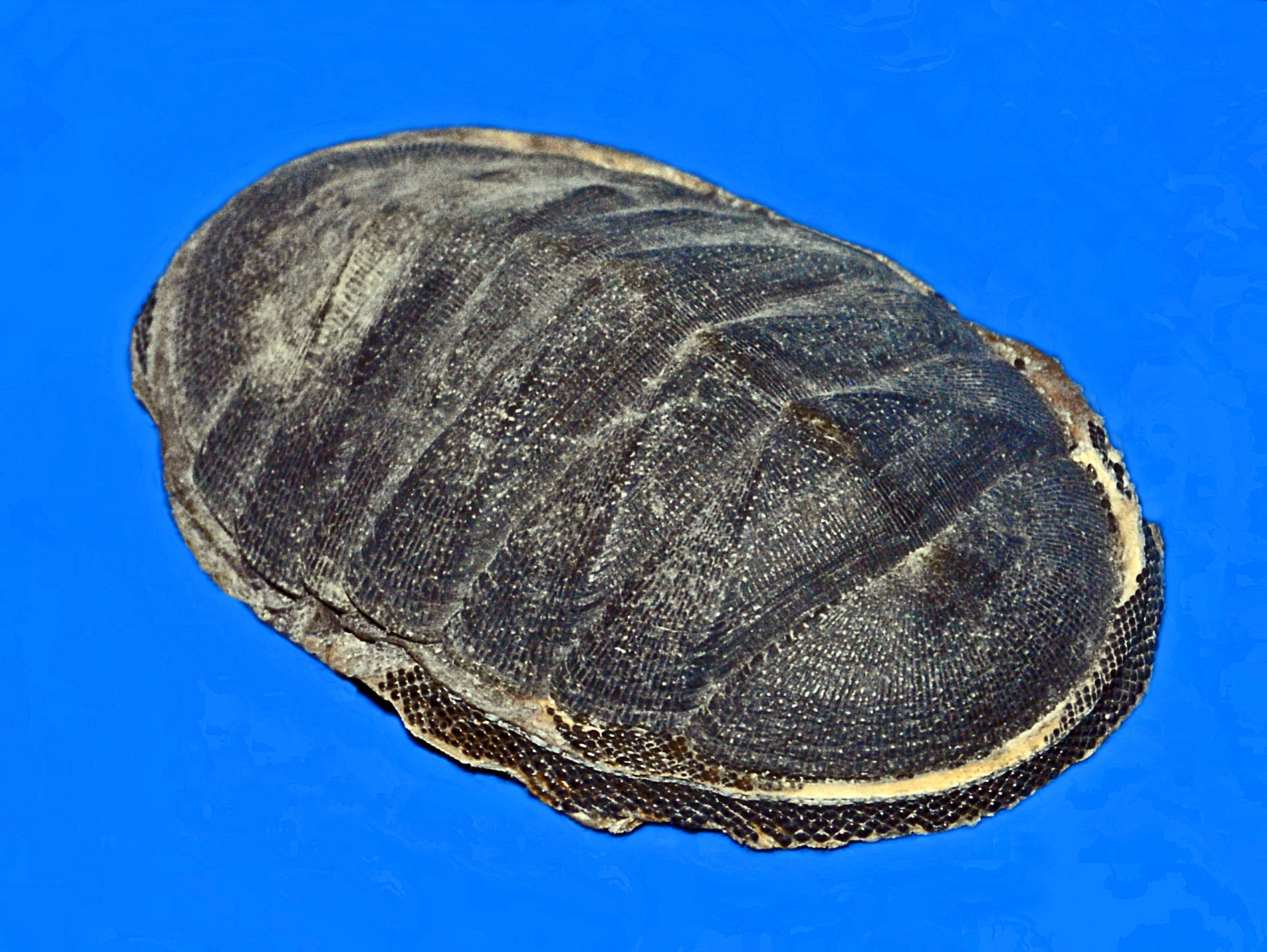
- Museum specimen of Chiton magnificus from Chile

Scientific classification
- Kingdom: Animalia
- Phylum: Mollusca
- Class: Polyplacophora
- Order: Chitonida
- Family: Chitonidae
- Genus: Chiton
- Species: C. magnificus

Binomial name
- Chiton magnificus (Deshayes, 1844)

= Chiton magnificus =

Species of mollusc

Chiton magnificus, the liquorice sea cradle, is a Southeast Pacific species of edible chiton, a marine polyplacophoran mollusk in the family Chitonidae, the typical chitons.

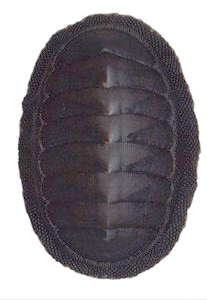
Chiton magnificus

== Description ==
Chiton magnificus is a very large chiton, with specimen confirmed at length of up to 17.4 cm (6.9 in). It is shiny and very dark bluish-grey.

== Distribution and habitat ==
The distribution of Chiton magnificus ranges along the Pacific coast of South America from Cape Horn in Chile to San Lorenzo Island in Peru. Although there are old claimed records of this species from the Galápagos Islands, these are now considered incorrect.

This species is found in places with strong current along rocky coasts, including pools. It can be found at depths of 0–31 m (0–102 ft), but in northern Chile it appears to be restricted to subtidal areas.

== Human use ==
Chiton magnificus is edible. Although relatively uncommon, it is one of the few commercially important chitons in its range, others being the even larger, up to 23 cm (9.1 in), spiny Acanthopleura echinata and the smaller, up to 4.5 cm (1.8 in), brownish Chiton granosus.
