= Girdle (chiton) =

Part of the anatomy of a chiton, a class of marine mollusks

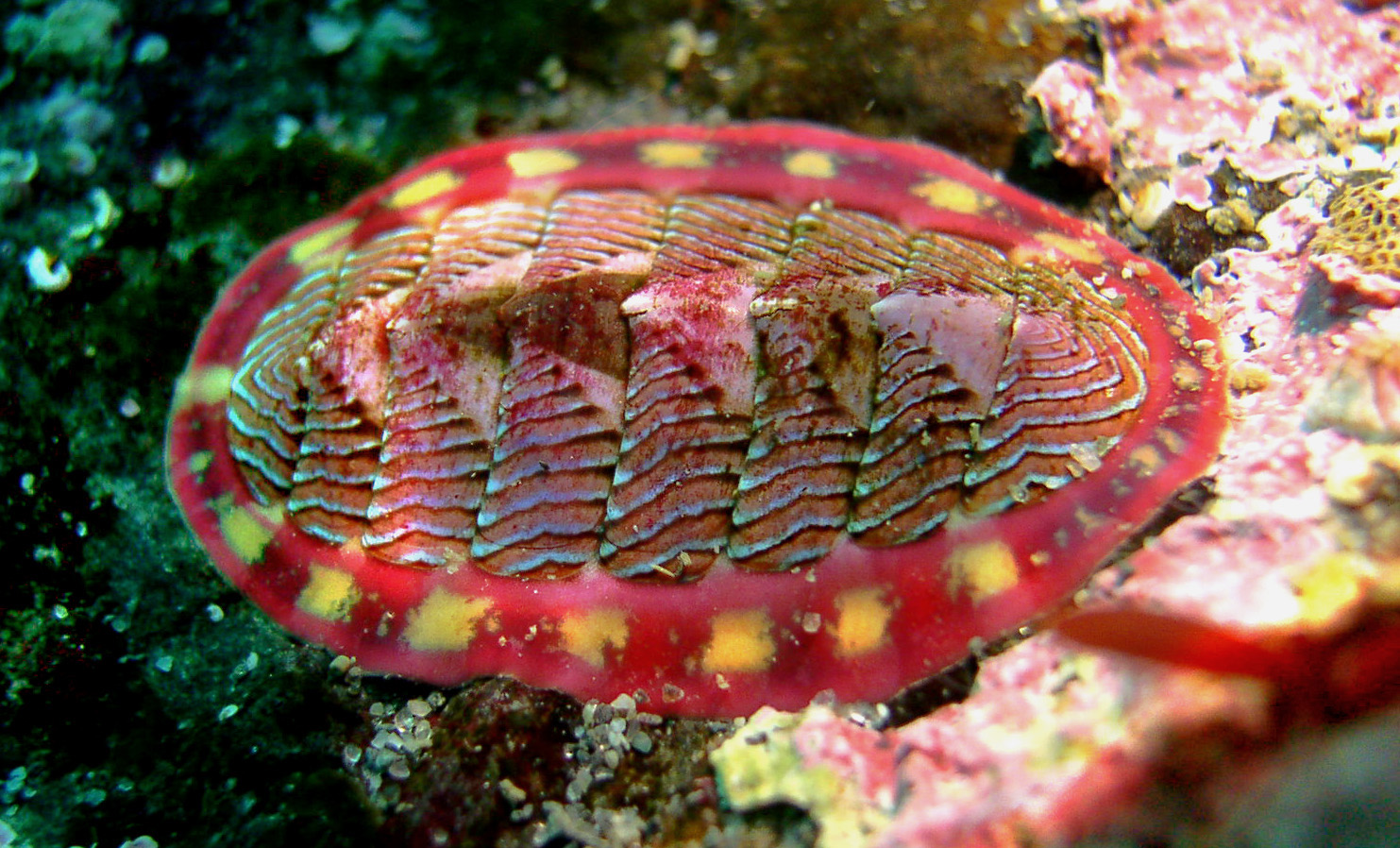
This live chiton, Tonicella lineata, has a girdle that is dark pink with yellow squarish dots

A girdle is part of the anatomy of a chiton, one class of marine mollusks, the class Polyplacophora.

== Characteristics ==
The shell of a chiton consists of eight valves which articulate with one another. The girdle is a strong but flexible structure that in most cases encircles the plates, holding them all together.

Details of the external surface of the girdle are often useful in identifying the taxonomic family, genus and species of chiton. For example, the girdle may be covered in overlapping scales, spikes, or it may have tufts of glassy bristles protruding from it.

In a few genera of chitons, the girdle covers the valves either partially, as in the Black Katy chiton, or completely, as with the gumboot chiton.
