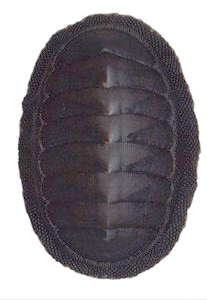
- Chiton magnificus

Scientific classification
- Kingdom: Animalia
- Phylum: Mollusca
- Class: Polyplacophora
- Order: Chitonida
- Suborder: Chitonina
- Family: Chitonidae; Rafinesque, 1815

Genera
- 16, 15 extant, see text

= Chitonidae =

Family of molluscs

Chitonidae is a family of chitons or polyplacophorans, marine mollusks whose shell is composed of eight articulating plates or valves. There are fifteen extant genera in three subfamilies.

== Subfamilies and genera ==
Subfamilies and genera within the family Chitonidae include:

  - Subfamily Chitoninae Rafinesque, 1815
    - Chiton Linnaeus, 1758 – the type genus of the family
    - Amaurochiton Thiele, 1893
    - Radsia Gray, 1847
    - Sypharochiton Thiele, 1893
    - Nodiplax Beu, 1967
    - Rhyssoplax Thiele, 1893
    - Teguloaplax Iredale & Hull, 1926
    - Mucrosquama Iredale, 1893
  - Subfamily Toniciinae Pilsbry, 1893
    - Tonicia Gray, 1847
    - Onithochiton Gray, 1847
  - Subfamily Acanthopleurinae Dall, 1889
    - Acanthopleura Guilding, 1829
    - Liolophura Pilsbry, 1893
    - Enoplochiton Gray, 1847
    - Squamopleura Nierstrasz, 1905
