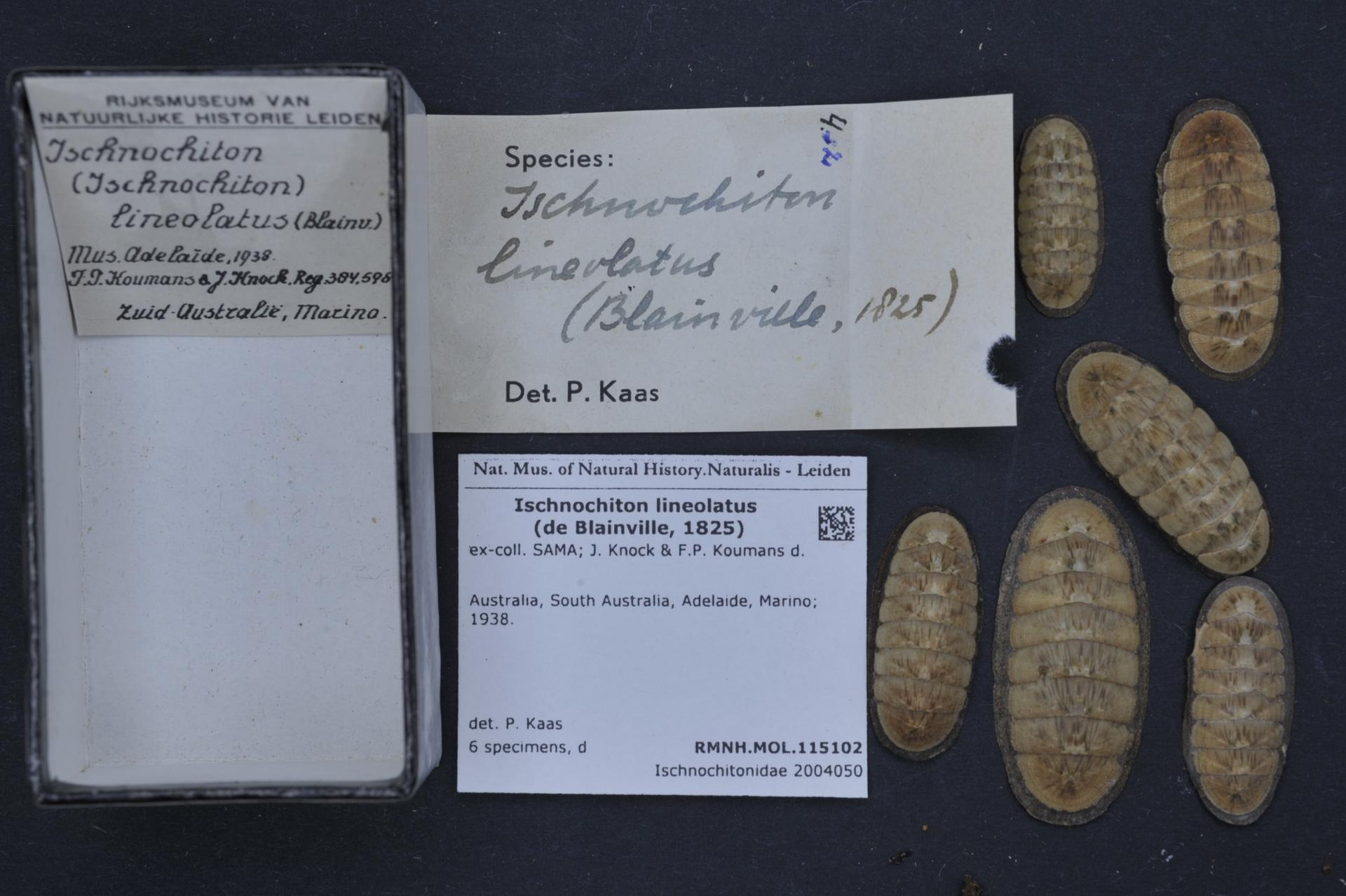

Scientific classification
- Kingdom: Animalia
- Phylum: Mollusca
- Class: Polyplacophora
- Order: Chitonida
- Family: Ischnochitonidae
- Genus: Ischnochiton
- Species: I. lineolatus

Binomial name
- Ischnochiton lineolatus (Blainville, 1825)

= Ischnochiton lineolatus =

Species of mollusc

Ischnochiton lineolatus, commonly known as the lined ischnochiton is a species of chiton in the genus Ischnochiton that lives under rocks in the intertidal waters of southern and south-western Australia, from Bass Strait to the central west coast. It is commonly found throughout its wide range, and is often found with Ischnochiton cariosus. It grows to 40 mm long. Its back has a brown rim, and white scales with scattered brown dashes parallel with its axis.
