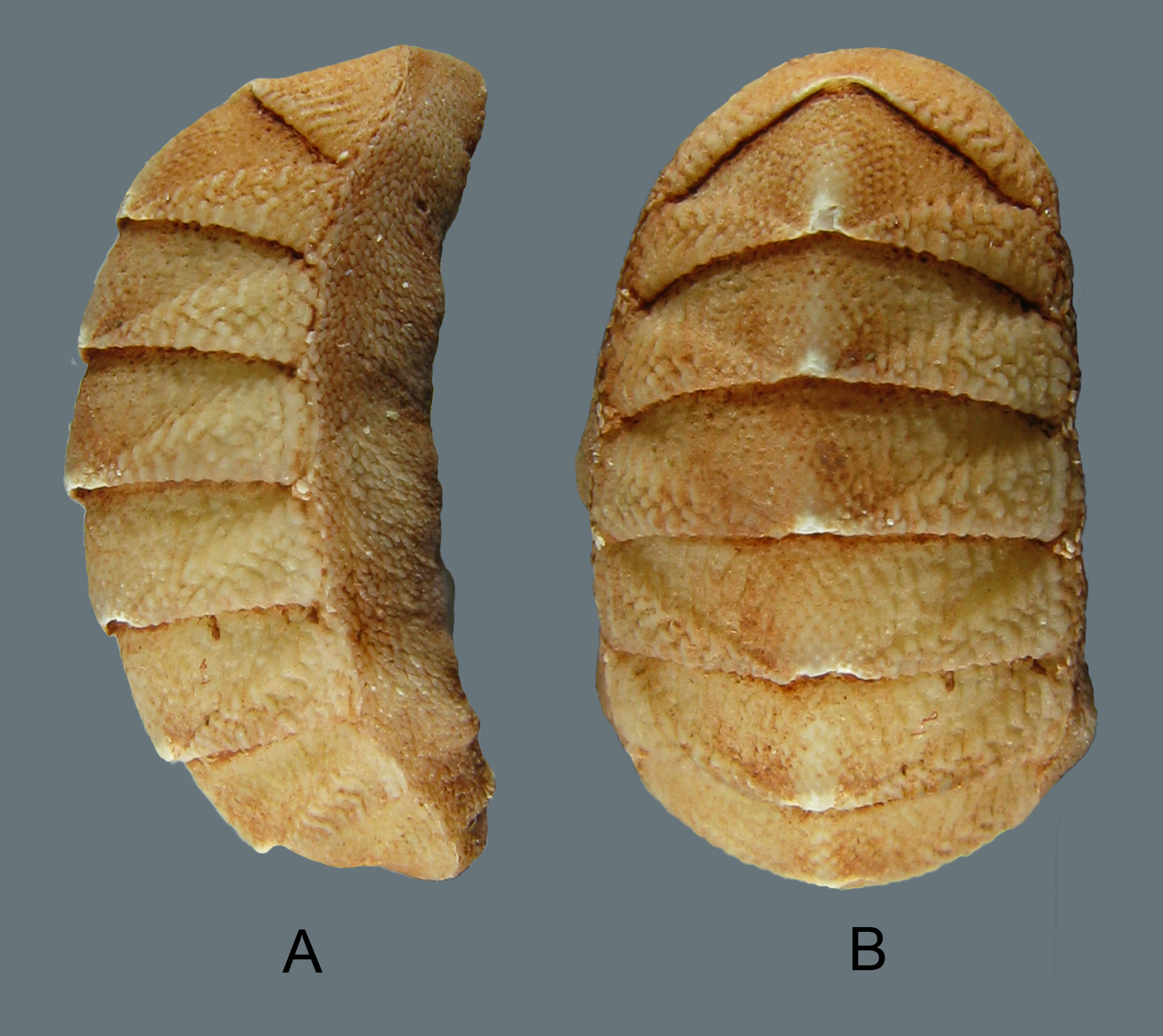
- Shell of Thermochiton papuaensis (holotype at MNHN, Paris)

Scientific classification
- Domain: Eukaryota
- Kingdom: Animalia
- Phylum: Mollusca
- Class: Polyplacophora
- Order: Chitonida
- Suborder: Chitonina
- Family: Ischnochitonidae
- Genus: Thermochiton; Saito & Okutani, 1990

Type species
- Thermochiton undocostatus Saito & Okutani, 1990

= Thermochiton =

Genus of molluscs

Thermochiton is a genus of polyplacophoran molluscs in the family Ischnochitonidae.

== Species ==
- Thermochiton papuaensis Sirenko, 2020
- Thermochiton undocostatus Saito & Okutani, 1990
- Thermochiton xui H. Wang, J. L. Zhang & Sirenko, 2022
