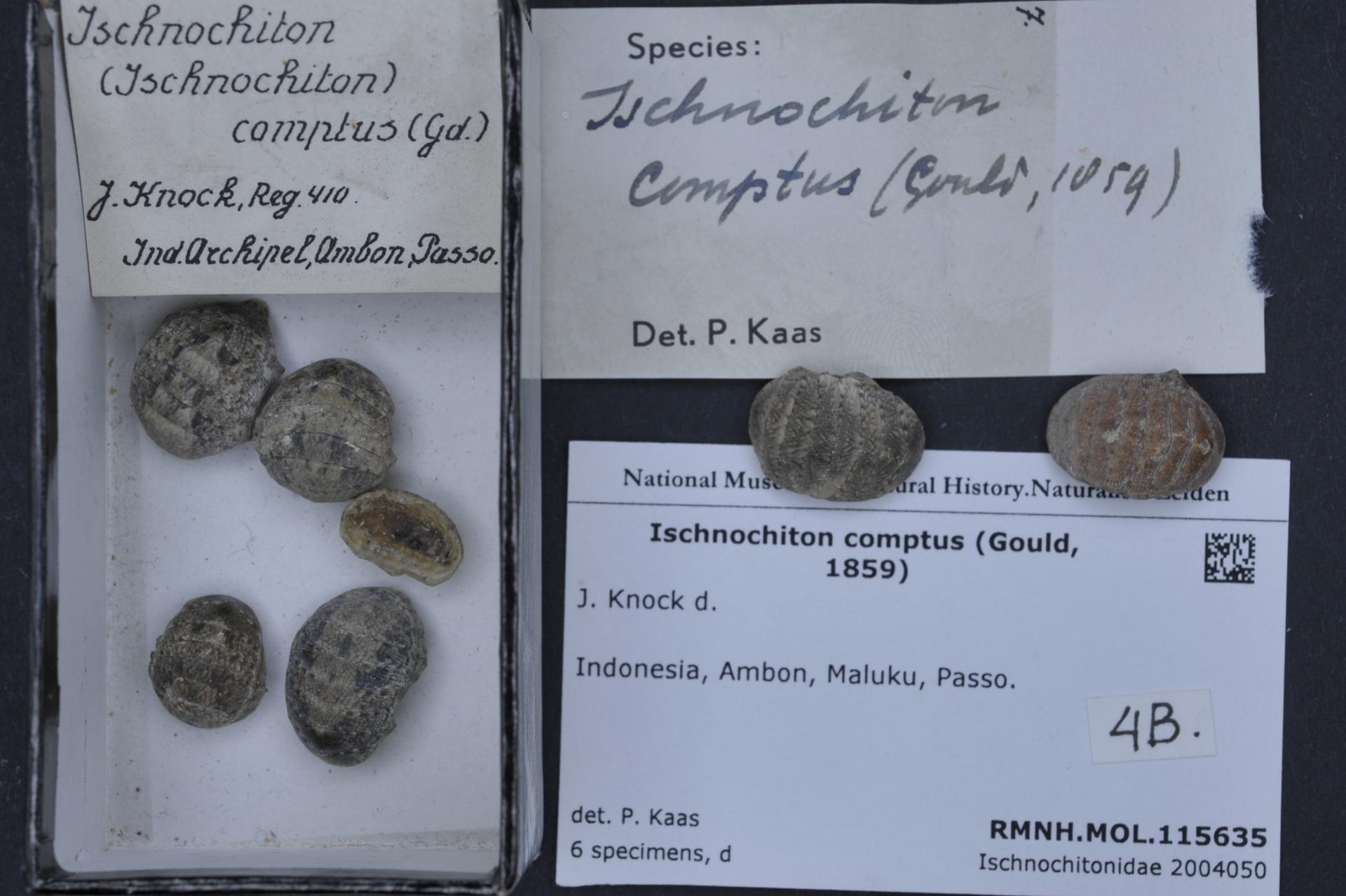

Scientific classification
- Kingdom: Animalia
- Phylum: Mollusca
- Class: Polyplacophora
- Order: Chitonida
- Family: Ischnochitonidae
- Genus: Ischnochiton
- Species: I. comptus

Binomial name
- Ischnochiton comptus (Gould, 1859)

Synonyms
- Chiton (Leptochiton) comptus Gould, 1859 (original combination); Ischnochiton (Haploplax) comptus (Gould, 1859)(alternative representation); Ischnochiton (Ischnochiton) comptus (Gould, 1859)

= Ischnochiton comptus =

Species of mollusc

Ischnochiton comptus is a medium-sized polyplacophoran mollusc in the family Ischnochitonidae.

The species is 30 mm in size.

== Distribution ==
Mainly distributed in the North Pacific region, such as: South Korea, Taiwan, Mainland China, Japan especially in central Honshu. Can be seen on rocks in intertidal zone and neritic zone.

== See also ==
- Ischnochiton boninensis
