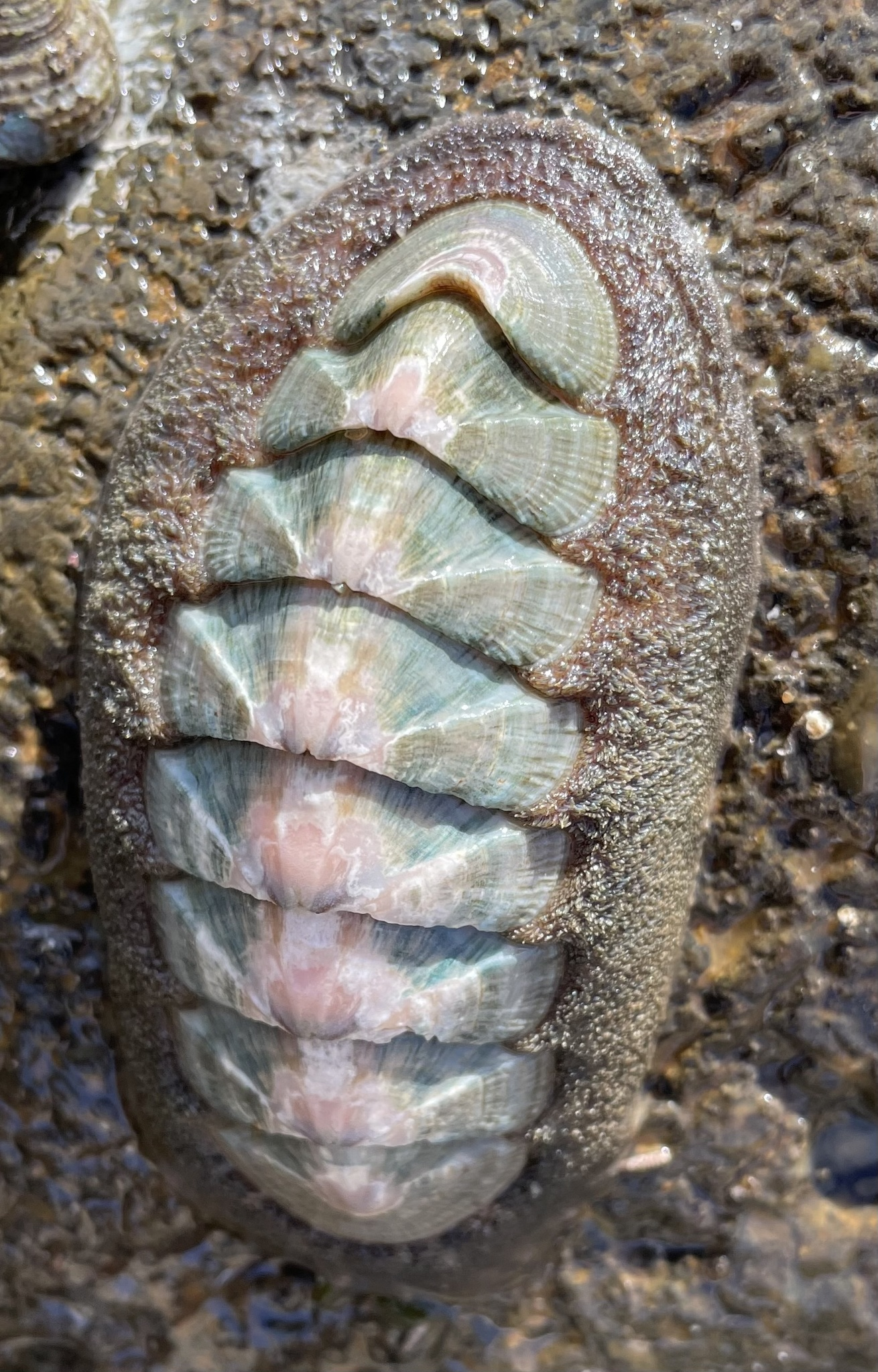
- Conspicuous chiton, South La Jolla State Marine Reserve, California

Scientific classification
- Kingdom: Animalia
- Phylum: Mollusca
- Class: Polyplacophora
- Order: Chitonida
- Family: Ischnochitonidae
- Genus: Stenoplax
- Species: S. conspicua

Binomial name
- Stenoplax conspicua (Pilsbry, 1892)

Synonyms
- Ischnochiton (Stenoradsia) conspicuus Carpenter MS, Pilsbry, 1892; Stenoplax (Maugerella) conspicua (Pilsbry, 1892); Stenoplax (Stenoradsia) conspicua (Pilsbry, 1892)

= Stenoplax conspicua =

Species of mollusc

Stenoplax conspicua, the conspicuous chiton, is a species of polyplacophoran mollusc belonging to the family Ischnochitonidae.

== Description ==
Stenoplax conspicua can reach a length of about 15.4 centimetres (6.1 in). These chitons may be gray, green and brown, commonly with pink in the middle of the valves.

== Distribution and habitat ==
This species can be found in Mexico, Baja California. It is found living in the intermediate and low tide zone behind tiny pebbles that are partially hidden in sand.
