= Ischnochiton granulifer =

Scientific classification
- Kingdom: Animalia
- Phylum: Mollusca
- Class: Polyplacophora
- Order: Chitonida
- Family: Ischnochitonidae
- Genus: Ischnochiton
- Species: I. granulifer

Binomial name
- Ischnochiton granulifer Thiele, 1909

Species of mollusc

Ischnochiton granulifer is a small species of chiton in the family Ischnochitonidae.
