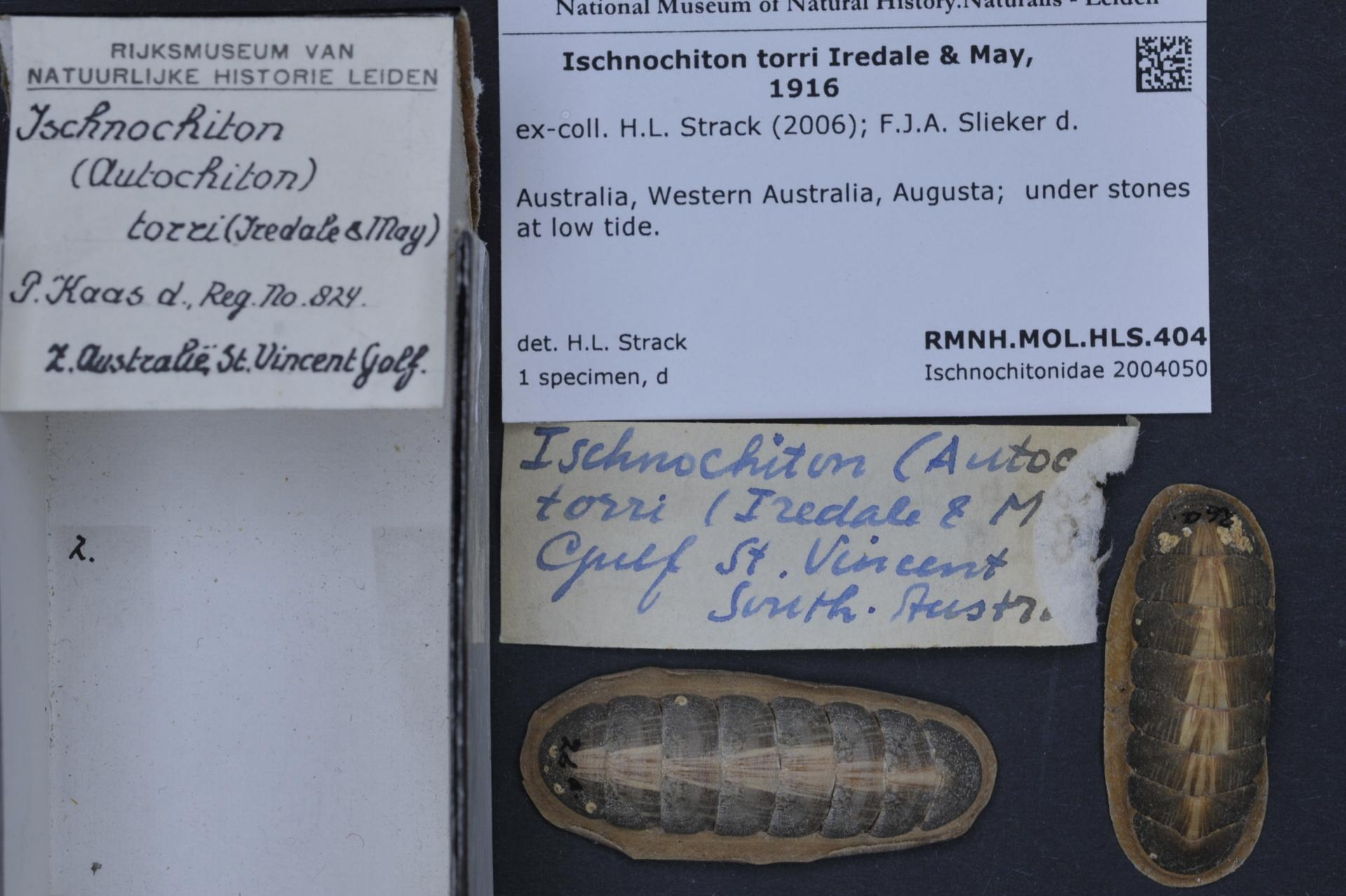

Scientific classification
- Domain: Eukaryota
- Kingdom: Animalia
- Phylum: Mollusca
- Class: Polyplacophora
- Order: Chitonida
- Family: Ischnochitonidae
- Genus: Ischnochiton
- Species: I. torri

Binomial name
- Ischnochiton torri Iredale & May, 1916

= Ischnochiton torri =

Species of mollusc

Ischnochiton torri, commonly known as Torr's ischnochiton, is a species of chiton in the genus Ischnochiton that lives under rocks in the intertidal and shallow subtidal waters of southern Australia. It is commonly found throughout its wide range, and is often found with Ischnochiton cariosus. It grows to 40 millimetres (1.6 in) long. Its back has an orange rim and a brown-scaled covering, with a cream-coloured stripe along its axis.
