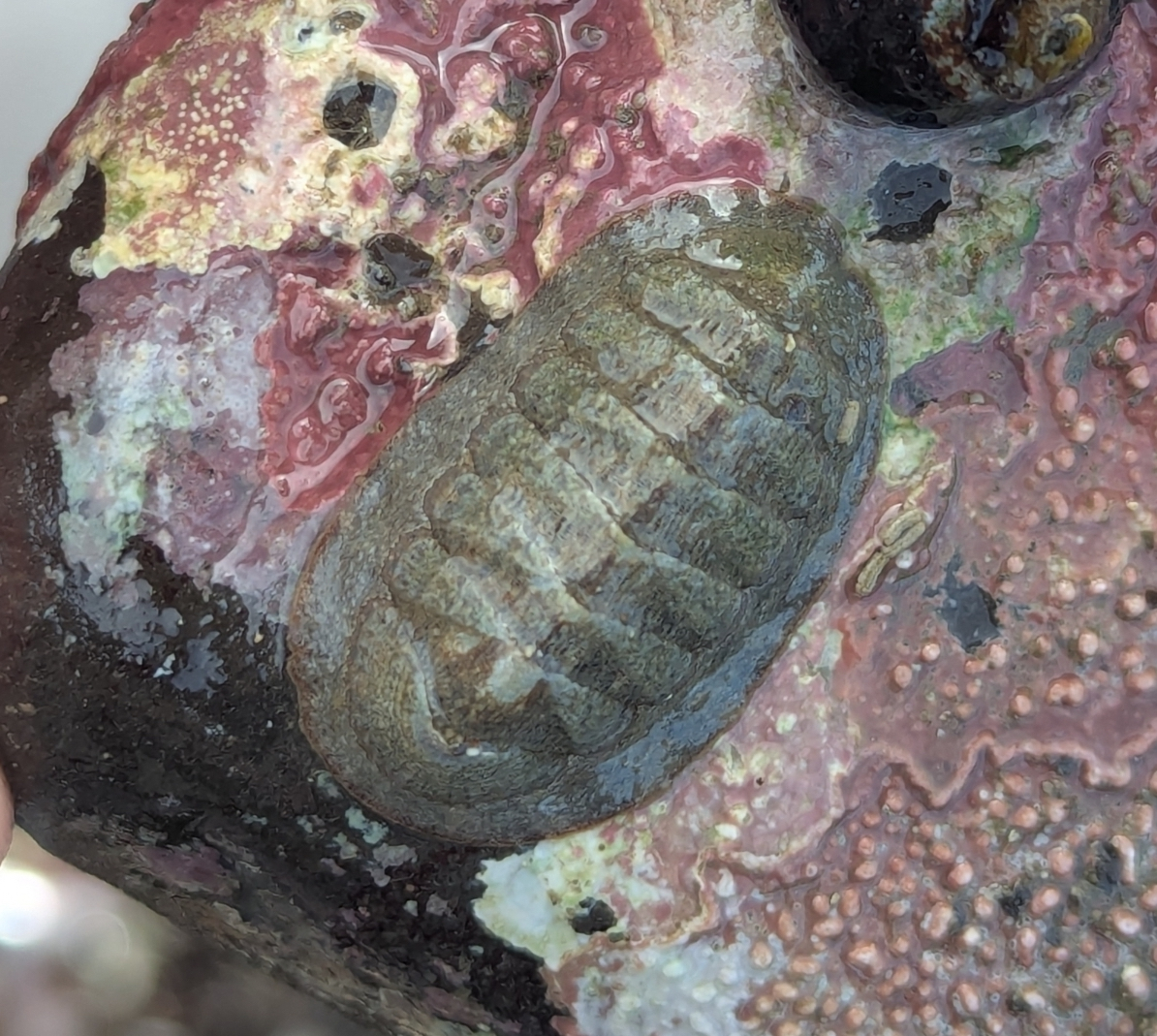

Scientific classification
- Kingdom: Animalia
- Phylum: Mollusca
- Class: Polyplacophora
- Order: Chitonida
- Family: Ischnochitonidae
- Genus: Lepidozona
- Species: L. cooperi

Binomial name
- Lepidozona cooperi P. P. Carpenter in Dall, 1879

= Lepidozona cooperi =

Species of mollusc

Lepidozona cooperi, commonly known as Cooper's chiton, is a common species of chiton found among intertidal rocks and boulders from Vancouver Island to Baja California.

== Description ==
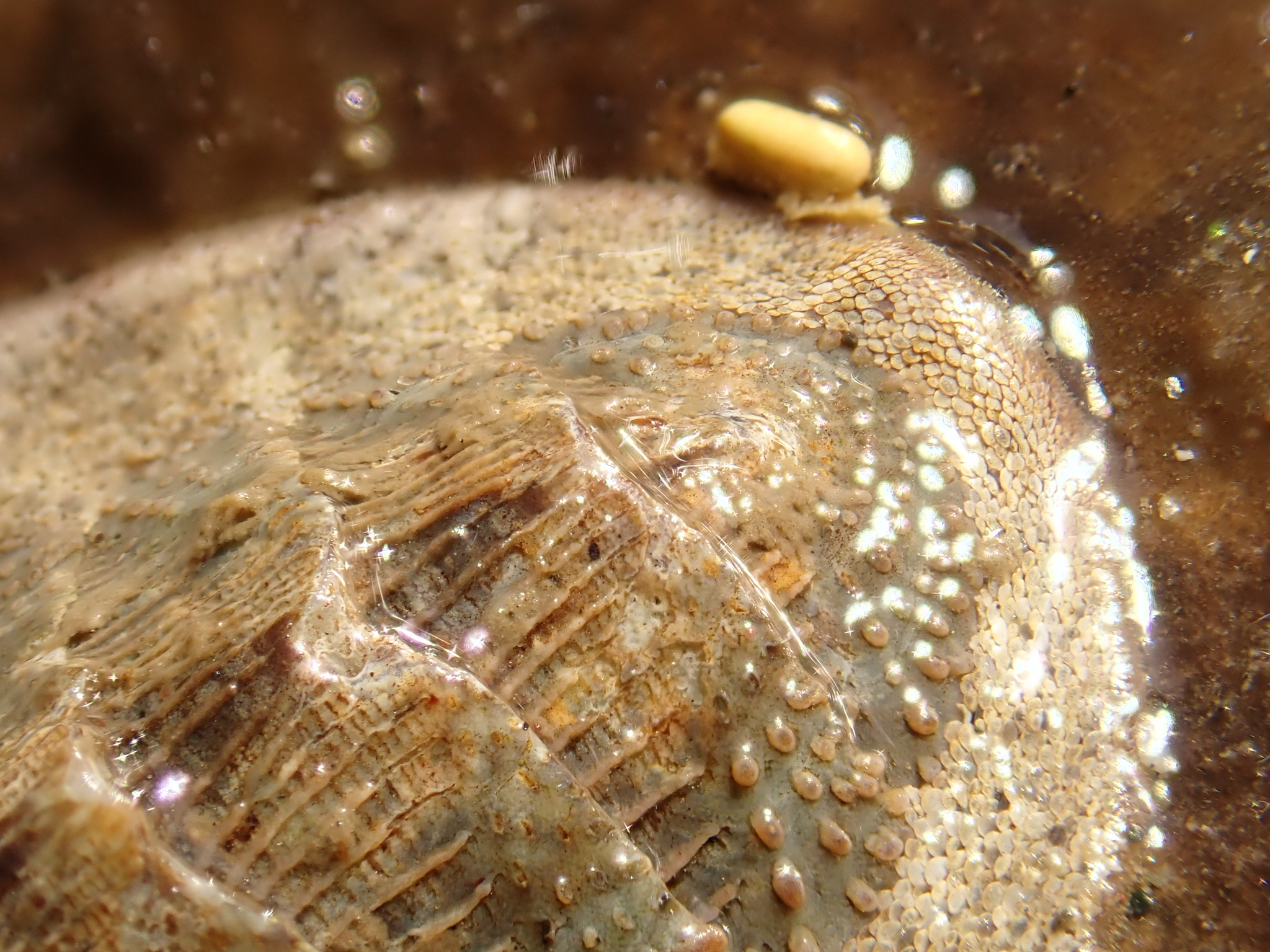
A macro shot of Lepidozona cooperi, showing its scaly girdle and beaded end valves.

At 30-40 mm, Lepidozona cooperi is a moderately large chiton. On the exterior surface, its valves are a dull olive green to gray color, while on the interior surface, they are sky blue. Its girdle generally has a rough texture from flat and deeply ridged scales. Its end valves have prominent beads arranged in radial ridges.

== Life cycle ==
Like other mollusks, L. cooperi eggs hatch into planktonic larvae called trochophores. These will metamorphose directly into young adults without a veliger stage.
