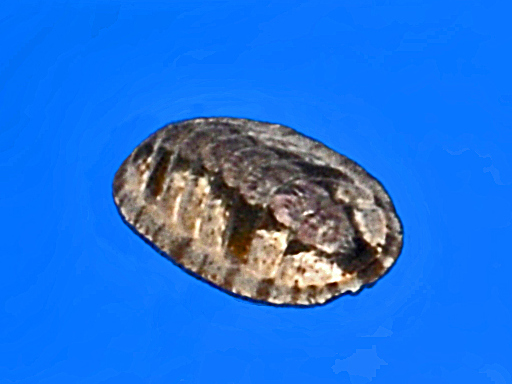
- Ischnochiton smaragdinus. Museum specimen

Scientific classification
- Domain: Eukaryota
- Kingdom: Animalia
- Phylum: Mollusca
- Class: Polyplacophora
- Order: Chitonida
- Family: Ischnochitonidae
- Genus: Ischnochiton
- Species: I. smaragdinus

Binomial name
- Ischnochiton smaragdinus (Angas, 1867)

Synonyms
- Ischnochiton resplendens Bednall & Matthews, 1906; Ischnochiton smaragdinus funereus Ashby, 1924; Ischnochiton smaragdinus picturatus Pilsbry, 1894; Lophyrus smaragdinus Angas, 1867

= Ischnochiton smaragdinus =

Species of mollusc

Ischnochiton smaragdinus is a species of chiton in the family Ischnochitonidae.

== Description ==
Ischnochiton smaragdinus can reach a length of about 36 millimetres (1.4 in).

== Distribution ==
This species is endemic to southeastern and southwestern Australia (New South Wales, South Australia, Tasmania, Western Australia).

== Habitat ==
These chitons live intertidally and subtidally under rocks and stones.
