= Ischnochiton textilis =

Scientific classification
- Kingdom: Animalia
- Phylum: Mollusca
- Class: Polyplacophora
- Order: Chitonida
- Family: Ischnochitonidae
- Genus: Ischnochiton
- Species: I. textilis

Binomial name
- Ischnochiton textilis (Gray, 1847)

Synonyms
- Chiton tigrinus Krauss, 1848; Ischnochiton tigrinus (Krauss, 1848)

Species of mollusc

Ischnochiton textilis, the textile chiton, is a medium-sized polyplacophoran mollusc in the family Ischnochitonidae, endemic to the coasts of South Africa and Namibia.

== Description ==
The shell is pale yellow to grey. Lateral areas and end valves bear fine radiating ridges, while the central plates are subtly pitted. The girdle is covered in small oval scales, each crossed by 12-24 fine ridges visible only under the microscope. The species is 20–40 mm in size.

== Distribution and habitat ==
Ischnochiton textilis occurs along the coastline of Southern Africa. Along the coast of the Cape of Good Hope, groups are common on the underside of boulders in rock pools, from where it may detach and roll up into a ball if disturbed.
