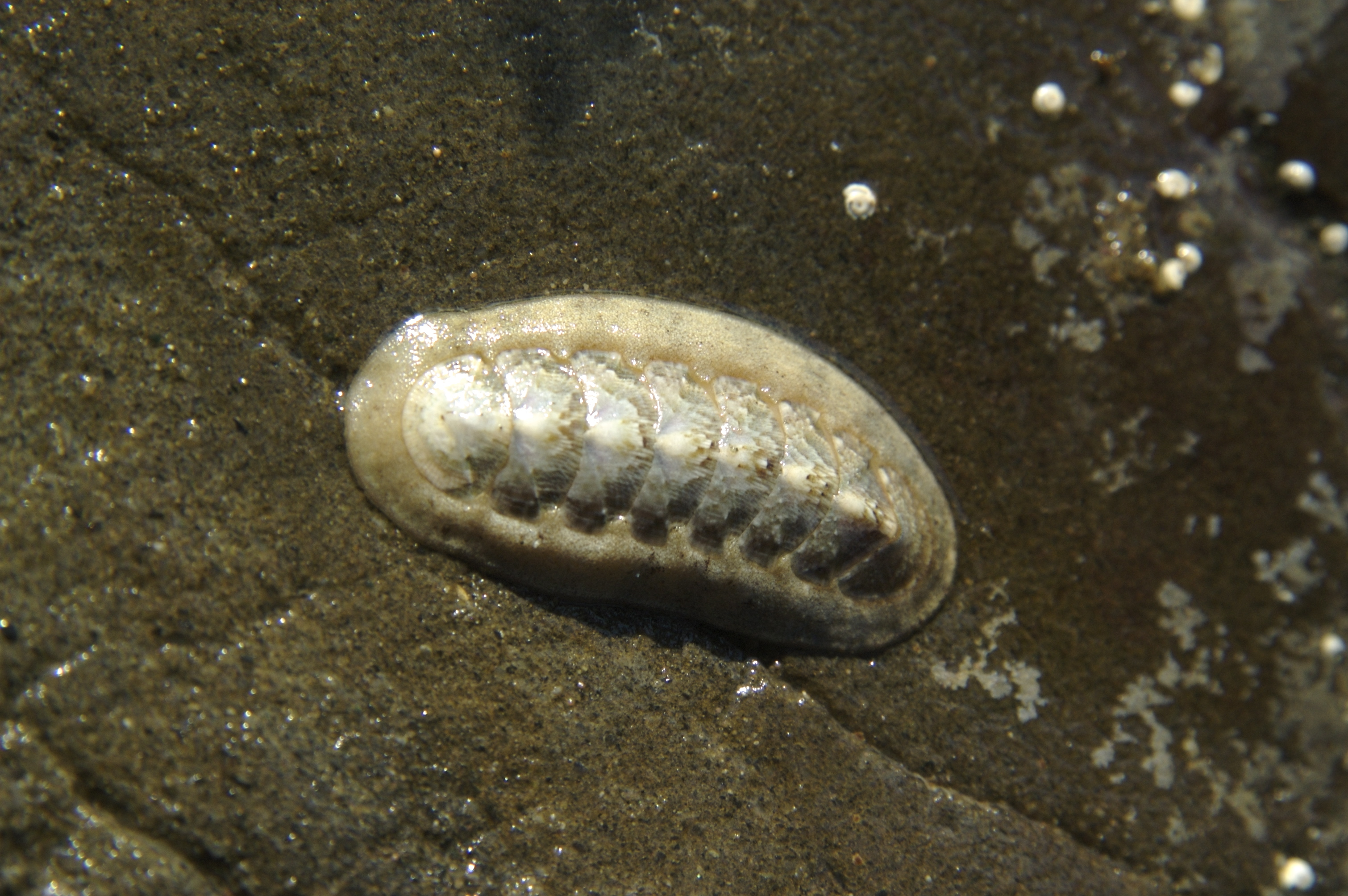

Scientific classification
- Kingdom: Animalia
- Phylum: Mollusca
- Class: Polyplacophora
- Order: Chitonida
- Family: Ischnochitonidae
- Genus: Stenoplax
- Species: S. heathiana

Binomial name
- Stenoplax heathiana Berry, 1946

Synonyms
- Ischnochiton heathiana Heath, 1899

= Stenoplax heathiana =

Species of mollusc

Stenoplax heathiana, commonly known as Heath's chiton, is a species of chiton found under rocks in the sandy middle and low intertidal, from Mendocino County, CA to Puerto Santo Tomás, Baja California.

== Description ==
Like other Stenoplax, Heath's chiton is a relatively narrow-bodied chiton, about two or three times as long as it is wide. It can grow up to 7.6 cm in length. It has a pale foot and a pale, cream-colored girdle. The species is most readily identified by its wide 8th plate.

== Life cycle ==
Like other mollusks, S. heathiana eggs hatch into planktonic larvae called trochophores. These will metamorphose directly into young adults without a veliger stage. The chitons are mostly nocturnal. Their diet mainly consists of algae that accumulates in the rocks of their environment.

== Etymology ==
Heath's chiton was named for Harold Heath, an invertebrate biologist and professor of zoology at Stanford.
