= Ischnochiton circumvallatus =

Scientific classification
- Kingdom: Animalia
- Phylum: Mollusca
- Class: Polyplacophora
- Order: Chitonida
- Family: Ischnochitonidae
- Genus: Ischnochiton
- Species: I. circumvallatus

Binomial name
- Ischnochiton circumvallatus (Reeve, 1847)

Synonyms
- Chiton circumvallatus Reeve, 1847; Lepidopleurus campbelli Filhol, 1880; Lepidopleurus melanterus Rochebrune, 1884; Ischnochiton parkeri Suter, 1897; Ischnochiton fulvus Suter, 1905; Ischnochiton circumvallatus Iredale and Hull, 1929

Species of mollusc

Ischnochiton circumvallatus is a common medium-sized species of chiton in the family Ischnochitonidae, endemic to the southern South Island and the Subantarctic Islands of New Zealand where it habits exposed rocky shores down to the low intertidal zone. Coloured light buff to light green on both surfaces, occasionally with reddish brown. Moderately raised shell and narrow girdle which has small scales. Broods larvae along the sides of the body.
