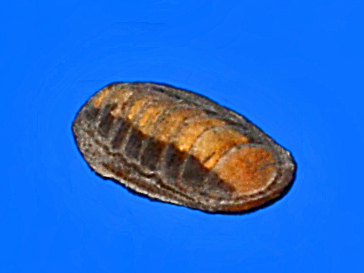
- Ischnochiton elongatus. Museum specimen

Scientific classification
- Kingdom: Animalia
- Phylum: Mollusca
- Class: Polyplacophora
- Order: Chitonida
- Family: Ischnochitonidae
- Genus: Ischnochiton
- Species: I. elongatus

Binomial name
- Ischnochiton elongatus (Blainville, 1825)

= Ischnochiton elongatus =

Species of mollusc

Ischnochiton elongatus, the lengthened chiton or elongate chiton, is a species of chiton in the family Ischnochitonidae.

== Subspecies ==
- Ischnochiton elongatus elongatus (Blainville, 1825)
- Ischnochiton elongatus crispus (Reeve, 1847)

== Description ==
Ischnochiton elongatus can reach a length of 25–35 millimetres (0.98–1.38 in). These medium-sized chitons are long oval shaped, with radiating, noduled ribs on the front valve and rows of bumps on the front edge.

== Distribution ==
This species can be found in Australia (New South Wales, South Australia, Western Australia).

== Habitat ==
It lives intertidally and subtidally under rocks and stones.
