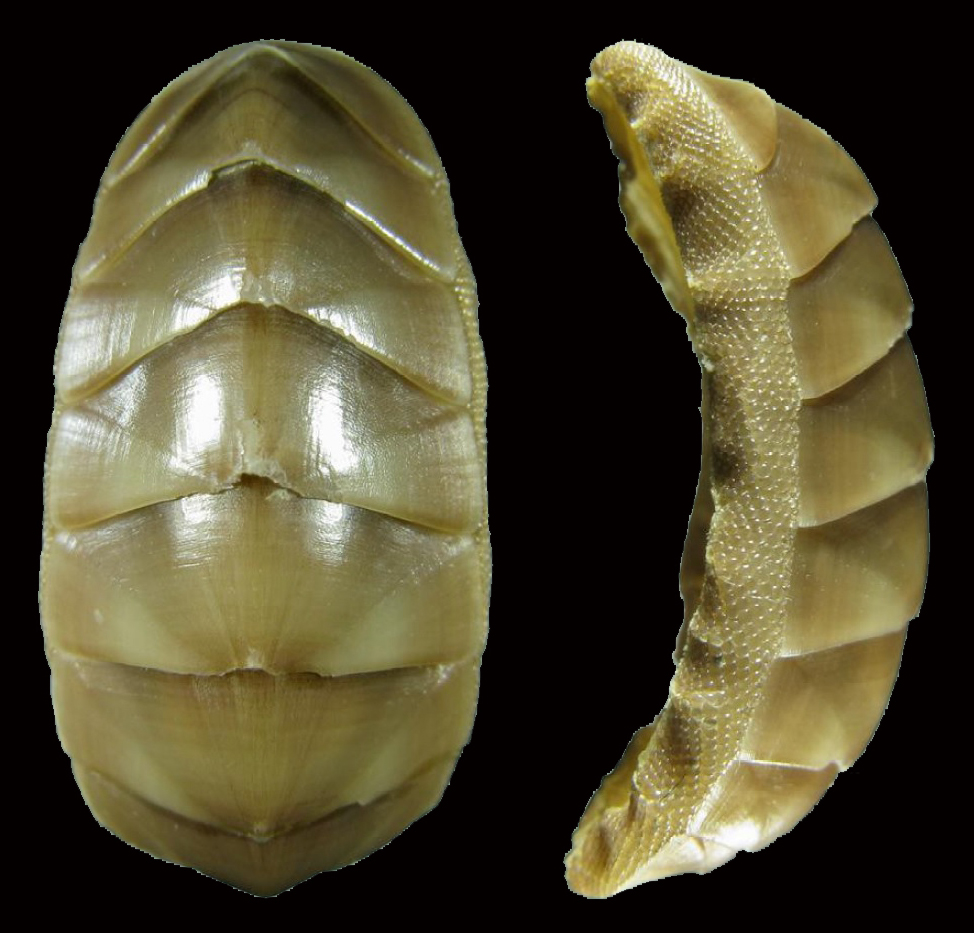
- Shell of Stenosemus nitens (MNHN-IM-2013-45830) 001.jpeg

Scientific classification
- Domain: Eukaryota
- Kingdom: Animalia
- Phylum: Mollusca
- Class: Polyplacophora
- Order: Chitonida
- Suborder: Chitonina
- Family: Ischnochitonidae
- Genus: Stenosemus; Middendorff, 1847

Type species
- Chiton albus Linnaeus, 1767

Synonyms
- Chiton (Stenosemus) Middendorff, 1847; Chondropleura Thiele, 1906; Ischnochiton (Chondropleura) Thiele, 1906; Ischnochiton (Stenosemus) Middendorff, 1847 ·; Lepidopleuroides Thiele, 1928 (objective synonym); Lophyrochiton Yakovleva, 1952 (objective synonym); Lophyrus G.O. Sars, 1878

= Stenosemus =

Extinct genus of molluscs

Stenosemus is a genus of polyplacophoran molluscs in the family Ischnochitonidae.

== Taxonomy ==
This genus is only tentatively placed in Ischnochitonidae.

== Species ==
- Stenosemus albus (Linnaeus, 1767)
- Stenosemus beui (O'Neill, 1987)
- Stenosemus chiversi A. J. Ferreira, 1981
- Stenosemus delicatus (Kaas, 1991)
- Stenosemus discernibilis (Kaas, 1991)
- Stenosemus dolii (Van Belle & Dell'Angelo, 1998)
- Stenosemus exaratus (Sars G. O., 1878)
- Stenosemus fijiensis Sirenko, 2017
- Stenosemus gallaecus (Carmona Zalvide, Urgorri & F. J. García, 2001)
- Stenosemus golikovi Sirenko, 1994
- Stenosemus herosae Sirenko, 2008
- Stenosemus kolesnikovi Sirenko, 1994
- Stenosemus merveae Sirenko, 2016
- Stenosemus mexicanus (Kaas, 1993)
- Stenosemus moskalevi Sirenko, 2016
- Stenosemus nitens Sirenko, 2020
- Stenosemus perforatus (Kaas, 1990)
- Stenosemus philippei Sirenko, 2017
- † Stenosemus radiatus Dell'Angelo, Lesport, Cluzaud & Sosso, 2020
- Stenosemus robustus (Kaas, 1991)
- Stenosemus sharpii (Pilsbry, 1896)
- Stenosemus simplicissimus (Thiele, 1906)
- Stenosemus solomonensis Sirenko, 2017
- Stenosemus stearnsii (Dall, 1902)
- Stenosemus substriatus (Kaas & Van Belle, 1990)
- Stenosemus undatopleuralis Sirenko, 2023
- Stenosemus vanbellei (Kaas, 1985)
- Stenosemus vitreolus (Kaas, 1985)
