= Ischnochiton bergoti =

Scientific classification
- Kingdom: Animalia
- Phylum: Mollusca
- Class: Polyplacophora
- Order: Chitonida
- Family: Ischnochitonidae
- Genus: Ischnochiton
- Species: I. bergoti

Binomial name
- Ischnochiton bergoti (Vélain, 1877)

Synonyms
- Chiton bergoti Vélain, 1877; Ischnochiton hewitti Ashby, 1931

Species of mollusc

Ischnochiton bergoti, the ribbed-scale chiton, is a small polyplacophoran mollusc in the family Ischnochitonidae, endemic to the west coast of southern Africa.

== Description ==
The species has somewhat drab colouring and is usually off-white to brown. Valves are finely pitted and may bear subtle radiating ridges. The scales of the girdle each bear between 3 and 8 coarse radiating ribs, visible under the microscope. Average body length is 10–20 mm.

== Distribution and habitat ==
Ischnochiton bergoti occurs along the west coast of southern Africa, in cold Atlantic coastal waters from southern Namibia to Cape Point in South Africa, where it can be found under stones below the high tide mark.

== Ecology ==
Like some other species of chiton, I. bergoti is thought to brood its eggs beneath its girdle.
