= Ischnochiton oniscus =

Scientific classification
- Kingdom: Animalia
- Phylum: Mollusca
- Class: Polyplacophora
- Order: Chitonida
- Family: Ischnochitonidae
- Genus: Ischnochiton
- Species: I. oniscus

Binomial name
- Ischnochiton oniscus (Krauss, 1847)

Synonyms
- Chiton oniscus Krauss, 1848; Ischnochiton eucosmia Turton, 1932 (invalid)

Species of mollusc

Ischnochiton oniscus, the dwarf chiton, is a small polyplacophoran mollusc in the family Ischnochitonidae, endemic to the coast of southern Africa.

== Description ==
This is the smallest chiton species in southern Africa, reaching an average length of no more than 10 mm. It displays a wide variety of colours and patterns, but is most often white. The valves bear fine pits which are often arranged in rows; radiating ridges are absent. The tiny scales covering the narrow girdle appear smooth to the naked eye but show minute ridges under the microscope.

== Distribution and habitat ==
Ischnochiton oniscus occurs along the coasts of southern Africa, from Saint Helena Bay on the west coast of South Africa to Maputo Bay in southern Mozambique. Small groups can be found on the underside of rocks in sandy pools.
