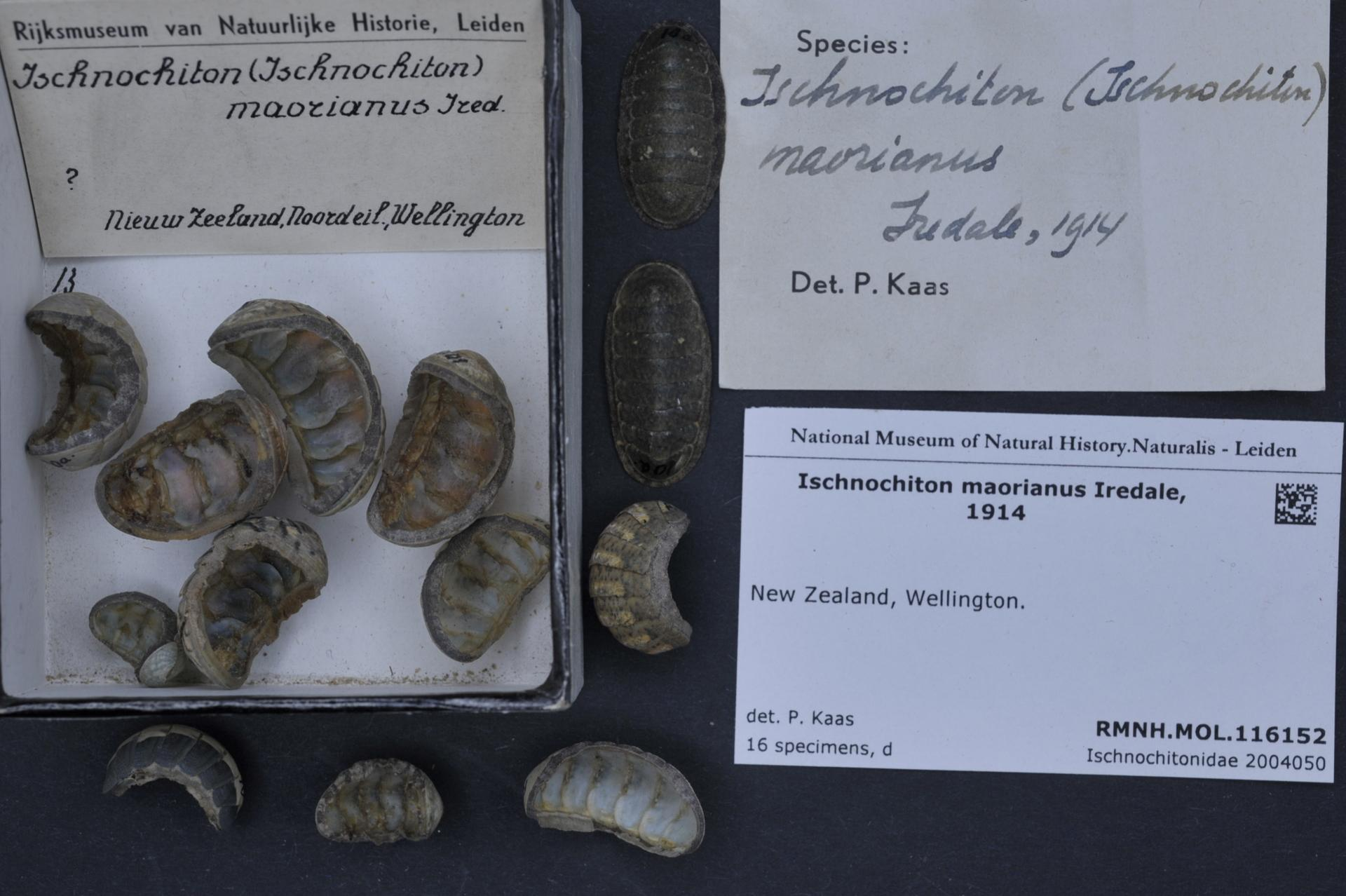

Scientific classification
- Kingdom: Animalia
- Phylum: Mollusca
- Class: Polyplacophora
- Order: Chitonida
- Family: Ischnochitonidae
- Genus: Ischnochiton
- Species: I. maorianus

Binomial name
- Ischnochiton maorianus Iredale, 1914

Synonyms
- Chiton longicymba Quoy and Gaimard, 1835; Ischnochiton longicymba Suter, 1913

= Ischnochiton maorianus =

Species of mollusc

Ischnochiton maorianus, sometimes called the variable chiton, is a fast moving species of chiton in the family Ischnochitonidae, endemic to the main islands of New Zealand where it is abundant.

== Description and habitat ==
Ischnochiton maorianus is a medium-sized cigar-shaped chiton up to 50mm in length. It is typically dull brown or grey-green though variants in its northern range are frequently also ranging from blue to orange. Small grainy riblets cover the outer parts of the valves, the centers being smooth or eroded. A white streak is often seen lengthways across the top. The girdle is narrow and may be irregularly banded in dark or light shades. They typically are found in sheltered harbours or exposed coasts, from the high intertidal zone to 25m deep, often aggregating in large numbers around the edge of cobbles at the sediment line or just below it.
