= Ischnochiton luteoroseus =

Scientific classification
- Kingdom: Animalia
- Phylum: Mollusca
- Class: Polyplacophora
- Order: Chitonida
- Family: Ischnochitonidae
- Genus: Ischnochiton
- Species: I. luteoroseus

Binomial name
- Ischnochiton luteoroseus Suter, 1907

Synonyms
- Ischnochiton (Ischnochiton) luteoroseus Suter, 1907· accepted, alternate representation; Ischnochiton mawsoni Cotton, 1937

Species of mollusc

Ischnochiton luteoroseus is a minute species of chiton in the family Ischnochitonidae.

== Distribution ==
This species is endemic to New Zealand.
