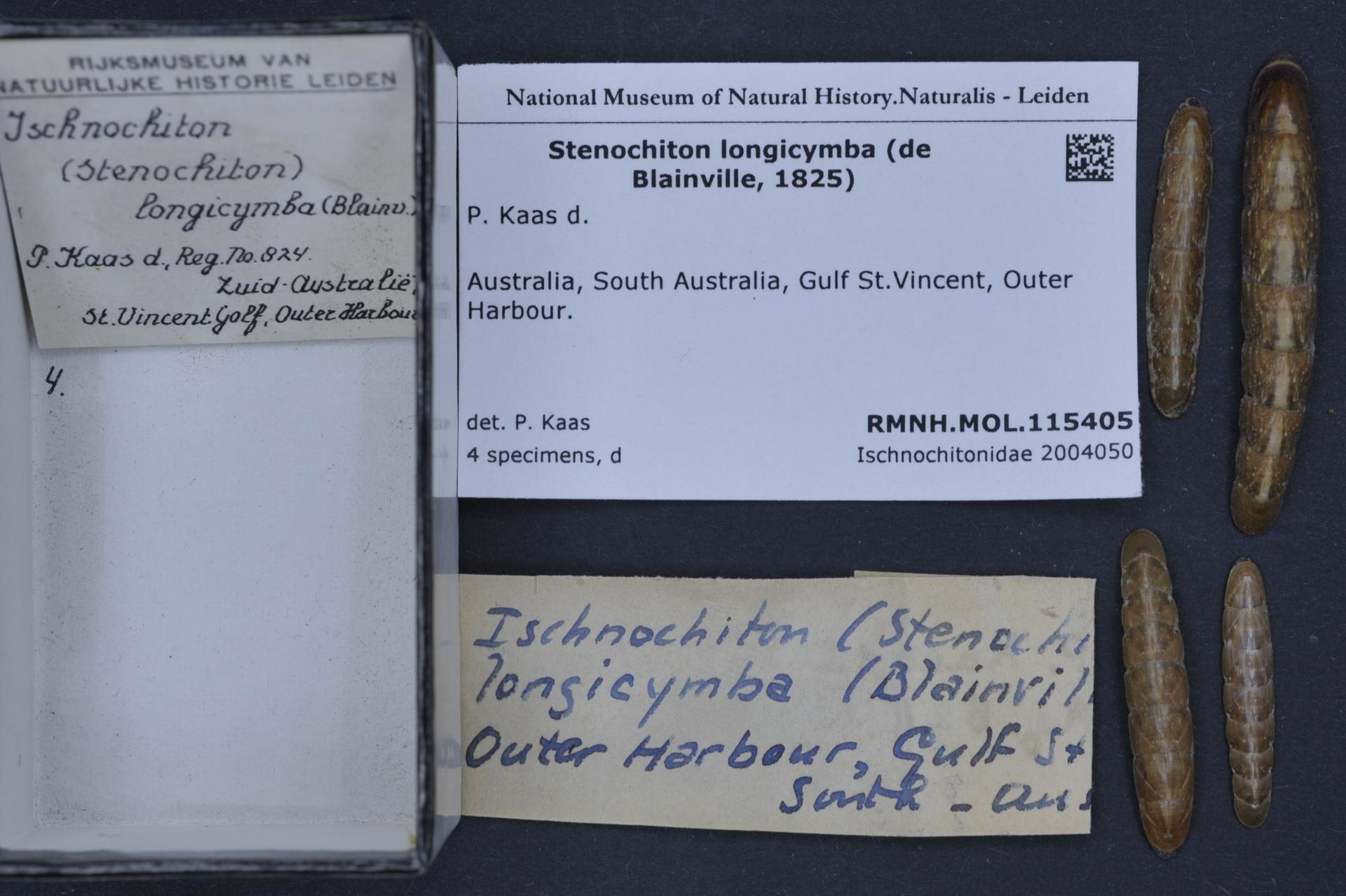

Scientific classification
- Kingdom: Animalia
- Phylum: Mollusca
- Class: Polyplacophora
- Order: Chitonida
- Family: Ischnochitonidae
- Genus: Stenochiton
- Species: S. longicymba

Binomial name
- Stenochiton longicymba Blainville, 1825

= Stenochiton longicymba =

Species of mollusc

Stenochiton longicymba, the clasping stenochiton is a species of polyplacophoran mollusc with an elongated shell, in the family Ishnochitonidae. It was first described by Henri Marie Ducrotay de Blainville in 1825 and is endemic to Australia's waters.

== Description ==
The clasping stenochiton has a medium-sized shell of about 25 to 40 mm, very narrow and remarkably elongated, being the most elongated of all living chitons as a result of an evolutionary adaptation to live on the blades and root sheaths of sea grasses such as Posidonia australis. The shell is brown with creamy white speckles and streaks but also contains smooth valves with fine reticulated patterns. The head and tail valves are semi-oval while the intermediary valves are rectangular.

== Distribution and habitat ==
The clasping stenochiton is endemic to Australia and its range spans from Western Australia to Tasmania. This chiton lives in the subtidal zone and thrives in the rich ecosystem of Australian seagrass meadows in which it feeds.

== Feeding ==
The clasping stenochiton is a grazer which feeds on seagrasses as well as on the algae that grows on them.
