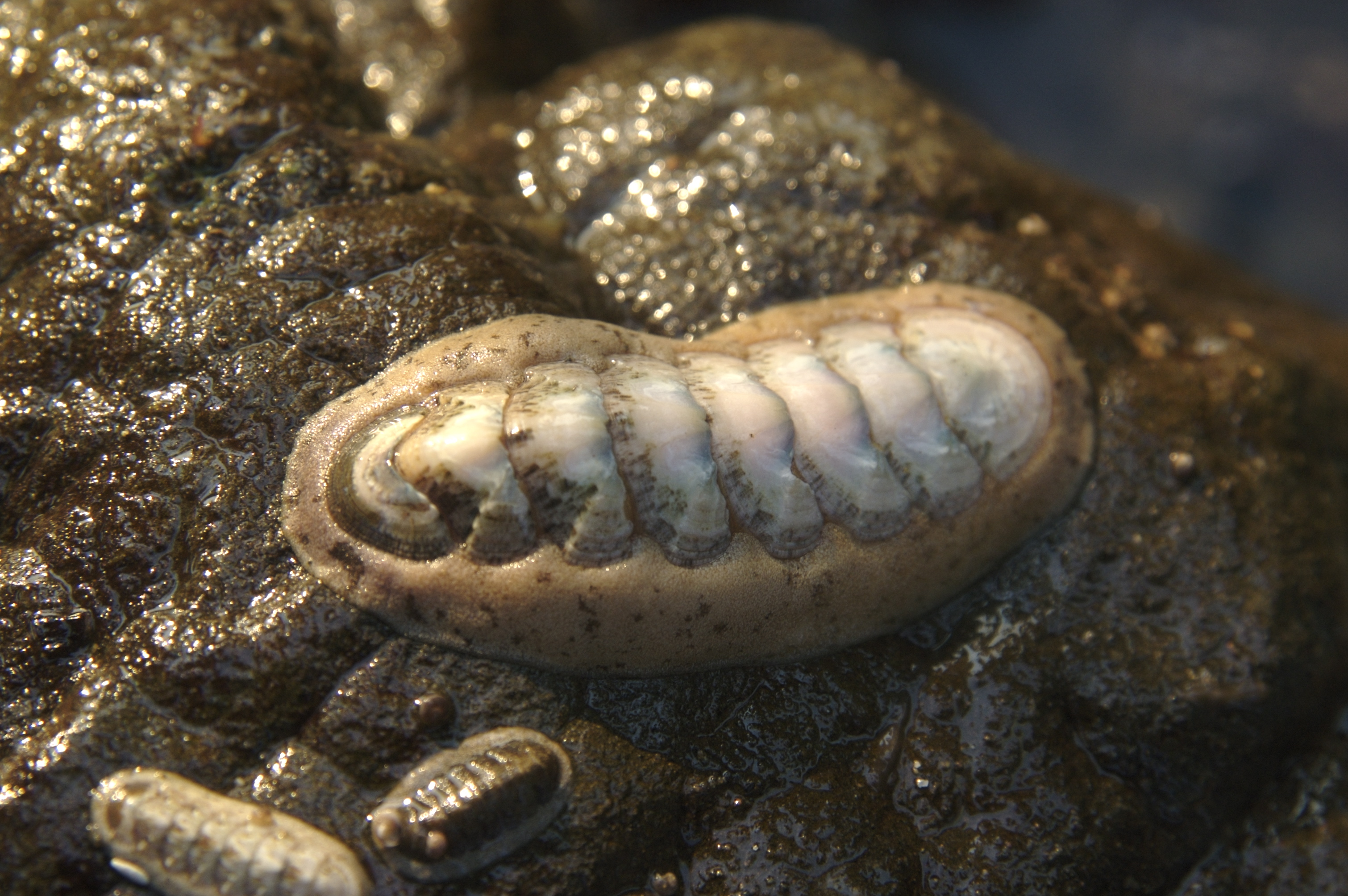
- Stenoplax heathiana

Scientific classification
- Domain: Eukaryota
- Kingdom: Animalia
- Phylum: Mollusca
- Class: Polyplacophora
- Order: Chitonida
- Suborder: Chitonina
- Family: Ischnochitonidae
- Subfamily: Ischnochitoninae
- Genus: Stenoplax; Dall, 1879

Type species
- Chiton limaciformis G. B. Sowerby I, 1832

Synonyms
- Ischnochiton (Stenoplax) Carpenter, 1879 (original rank); Ischnochiton (Stenoradsia) Carpenter, 1879 ·; Maugerella Carpenter [in Dall], 1879; Stenoplax (Maugerella) Carpenter in Dall, 1879; Stenoplax (Stenoplax) Carpenter, 1879 · alternate representation; Stenoplax (Stenoradsia) Carpenter in Dall, 1879 · alternate representation; Stenoradsia Carpenter [in Dall], 1879 (original combination)

= Stenoplax =

Genus of molluscs

Stenoplax is a genus of polyplacophoran molluscs in the family Ischnochitonidae.

== Species ==
Species within this genus include:

- Stenoplax alata (G.B. Sowerby II, 1841)
- † Stenoplax anglica Wrigley, 1943
- Stenoplax bahamensis Kaas & Van Belle, 1987
- Stenoplax boogii (Haddon, 1886)
- Stenoplax circumsenta Berry, 1956
- Stenoplax conspicua (Pilsbry, 1892)
- Stenoplax corrugata (Carpenter, 1892)
- Stenoplax fallax (Carpenter, 1892)
- Stenoplax floridana (Pilsbry, 1892)
- Stenoplax heathiana Berry, 1946
- Stenoplax hernandezi Dell'Angelo, Schwabe, Gori, Sosso & Bonfitto, 2014
- Stenoplax iansa Jardim & Almeida, 2021
- Stenoplax kempfi (Righi, 1971)
- Stenoplax lavanononensis Dell'Angelo, Sirenko & Prelle, 2015
- Stenoplax limaciformis (G.B. Sowerby I, 1832)
- Stenoplax lindholmii (Schrenck, 1862)
- Stenoplax madagassica (Thiele, 1917)
- Stenoplax magdalenensis (Hinds, 1845)
- Stenoplax marcusi (Righi, 1971)
- Stenoplax mariposa (Dall, 1919)
- † Stenoplax monila Cherns & Schwabe, 2019
- † Stenoplax paviai Dell'Angelo, Giuntelli, Sosso & Zunino, 2014
- Stenoplax petaloides (Gould, 1846)
- Stenoplax purpurascens (C. B. Adams, 1845)
- † Stenoplax quimperensis Dell'Angelo, Bonfitto & Taviani, 2011
- Stenoplax rugulata (G.B. Sowerby I, 1832)
- † Stenoplax selseiensis Wrigley, 1943
- † Stenoplax sigillarius Bielokrys, 1999
- Stenoplax sonorana Berry, 1956
- † Stenoplax veneta Dell'Angelo & Palazzi, 1992
- Stenoplax venusta (Is. & Iw. Taki, 1931)

Synonyms

- Stenoplax histrio Berry, 1945: synonym of Stenoplax mariposa (Dall, 1919)
- Stenoplax isoglypta S. S. Berry, 1956: synonym of Stenoplax boogii (Haddon, 1886)
