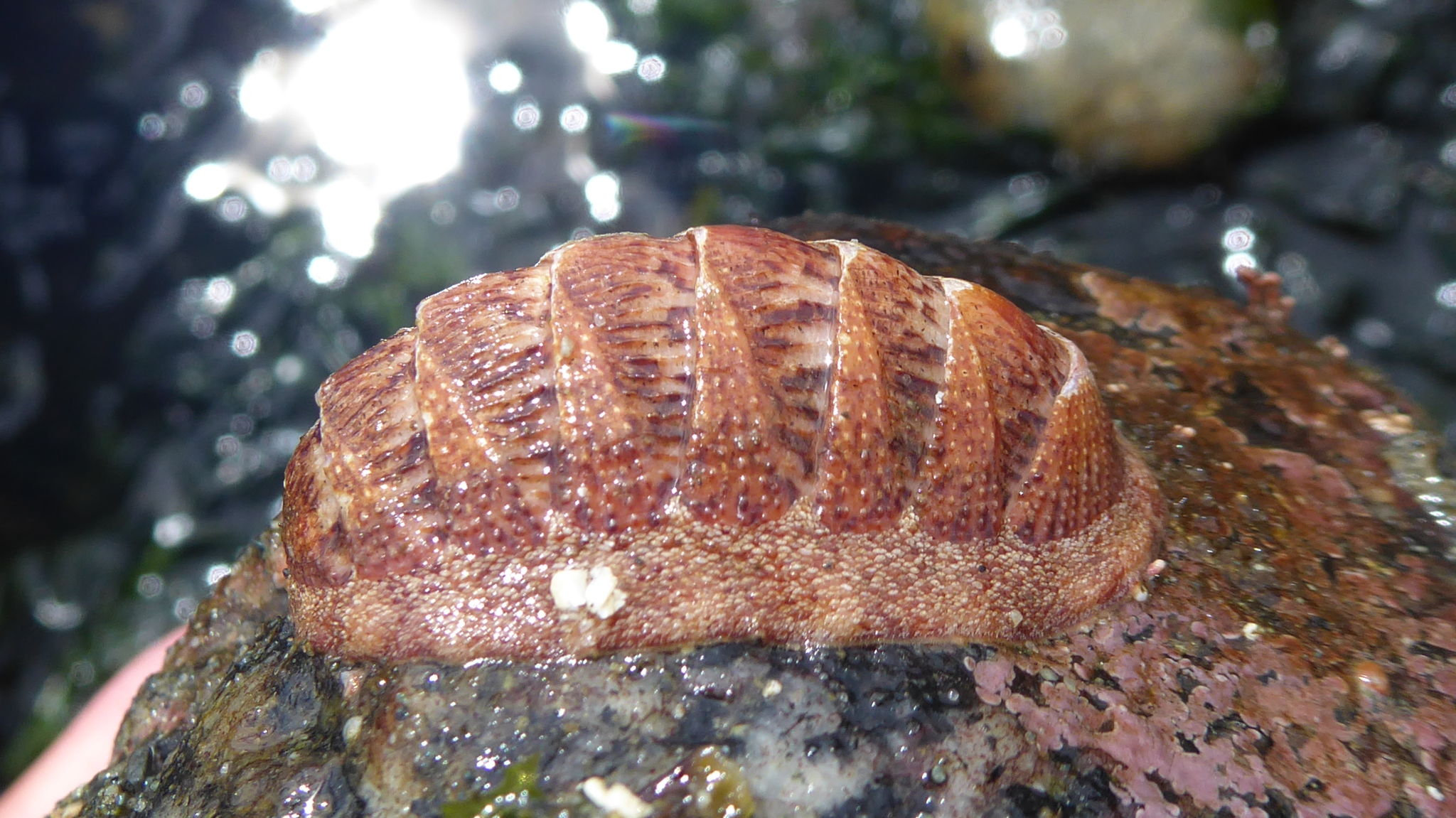

Scientific classification
- Kingdom: Animalia
- Phylum: Mollusca
- Class: Polyplacophora
- Order: Chitonida
- Family: Ischnochitonidae
- Genus: Lepidozona
- Species: L. mertensii

Binomial name
- Lepidozona mertensii Middendorff, 1847

Synonyms
- Chiton mertensii Middendorff, 1847

= Lepidozona mertensii =

Species of mollusc

Lepidozona mertensii, Merten's chiton, is a species of chiton found under intertidal rocks from northern Alaska to northern Mexico.

== Description ==
Lepidozona mertensii can grow to lengths of up to 5 cm. One of its distinguishing features is the presence of overlapping oval scales on the girdle, giving it a granular appearance. The girdle may also be banded with yellow and red, while the valves tend to be brown, cream, red, or even greenish-purple.

== Life cycle ==
Female Merten's chitons lay their eggs in cases, which hatch into planktonic larvae called trochophores. These will metamorphose directly into young adults without a veliger stage.

== Etymology ==
The genus name Lepidozona derives from the Greek words lepis, meaning scale, and zona meaning girdle. Alexander von Middendorff selected the specific epithet mertensii in honor of Karl Heinrich Mertens, to whom he presented his findings after returning from his voyage to the Sea of Okhotsk, sponsored by the Zoological Museum of the Imperial Academy of Sciences in Saint Petersburg.
