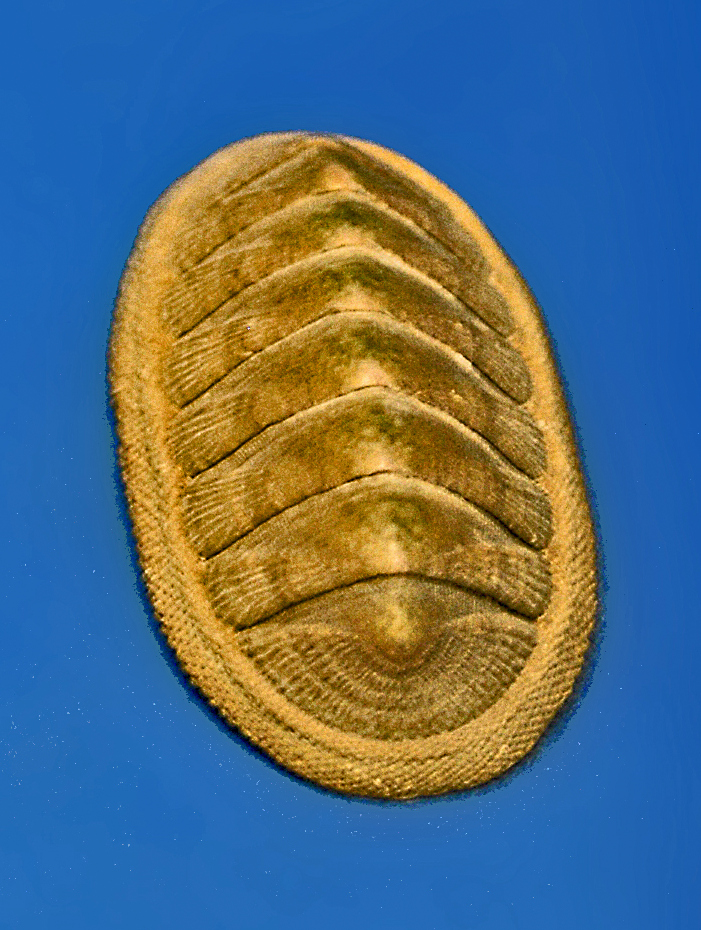
- Shell of Ischnochiton evanida from Tasmania on display at the Museo Civico di Storia Naturale di Milano

Scientific classification
- Domain: Eukaryota
- Kingdom: Animalia
- Phylum: Mollusca
- Class: Polyplacophora
- Order: Chitonida
- Family: Ischnochitonidae
- Genus: Ischnochiton
- Species: I. evanida

Binomial name
- Ischnochiton evanida Sowerby, 1840

= Ischnochiton evanida =

Species of mollusc

Ischnochiton evanida is a species of chiton in the genus Ischnochiton of the family Ischnochitonidae.

This species can be found in Australia and Tasmania. Shells can reach a length of about 32 millimetres (1.3 in).
