= Ischnochiton cariosus =

Scientific classification
- Domain: Eukaryota
- Kingdom: Animalia
- Phylum: Mollusca
- Class: Polyplacophora
- Order: Chitonida
- Family: Ischnochitonidae
- Genus: Ischnochiton
- Species: I. cariosus

Binomial name
- Ischnochiton cariosus Carpenter, 1879

Species of mollusc

Ischnochiton cariosus, commonly known as the corroded ischnochiton, is a species of chiton in the genus Ischnochiton that lives under rocks in the intertidal and shallow subtidal waters of southern Australia and up the coast of Western Australia as far as Shark Bay. It is commonly found throughout its range and is often found with Ischnochiton torri. It grows to 35 mm long and has a pale-straw colour.
