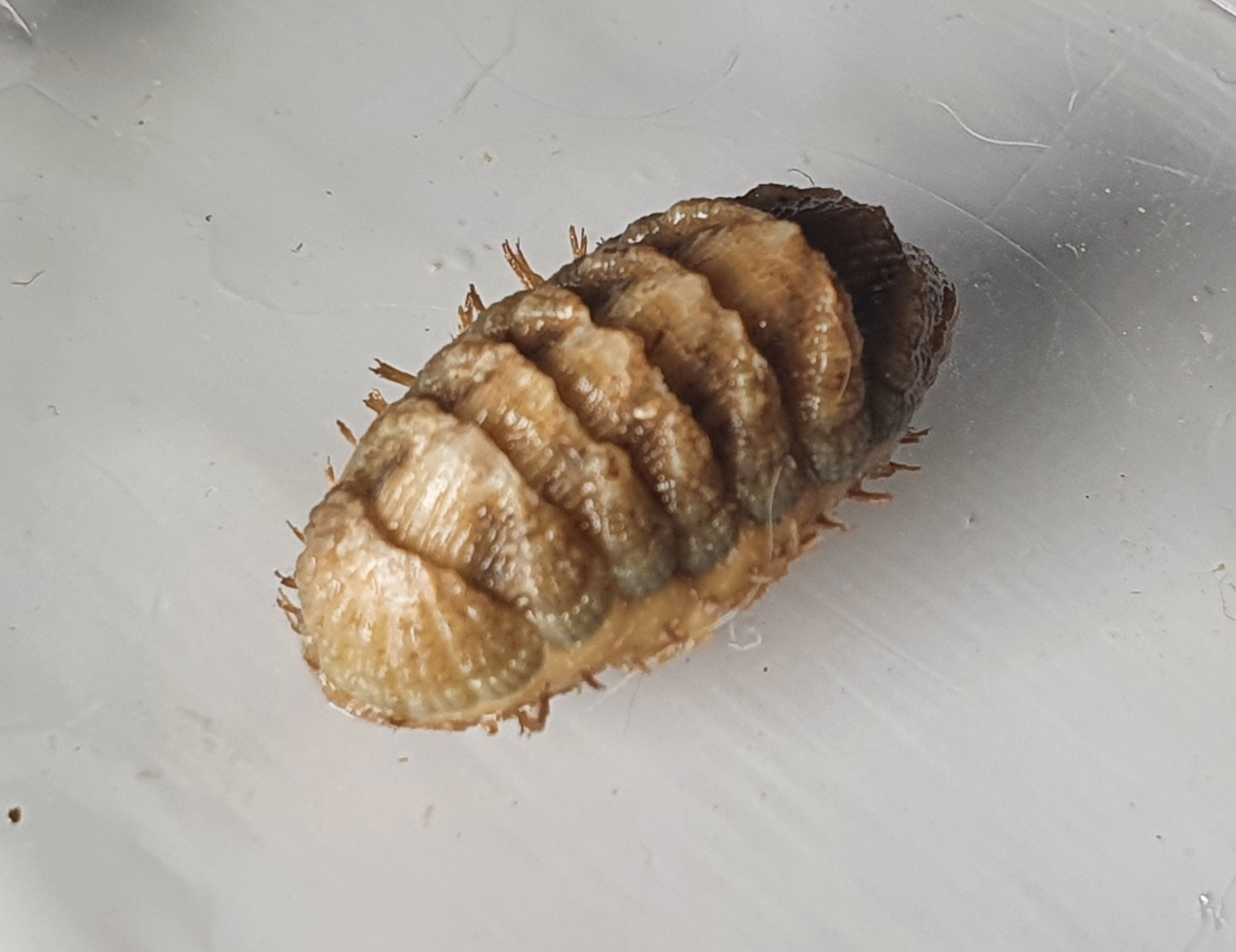

Scientific classification
- Domain: Eukaryota
- Kingdom: Animalia
- Phylum: Mollusca
- Class: Polyplacophora
- Order: Chitonida
- Family: Callistoplacidae
- Genus: Callistoplax; Carpenter
- Species: C. retusa

Binomial name
- Callistoplax retusa (Sowerby, 1832)

= Callistoplax =

Callistoplax retusa

Genus of molluscs

Callistoplax is a monotypic genus of chitons belonging to the family Callistoplacidae. The only species is Callistoplax retusa.

The species is found in North and Central America.
