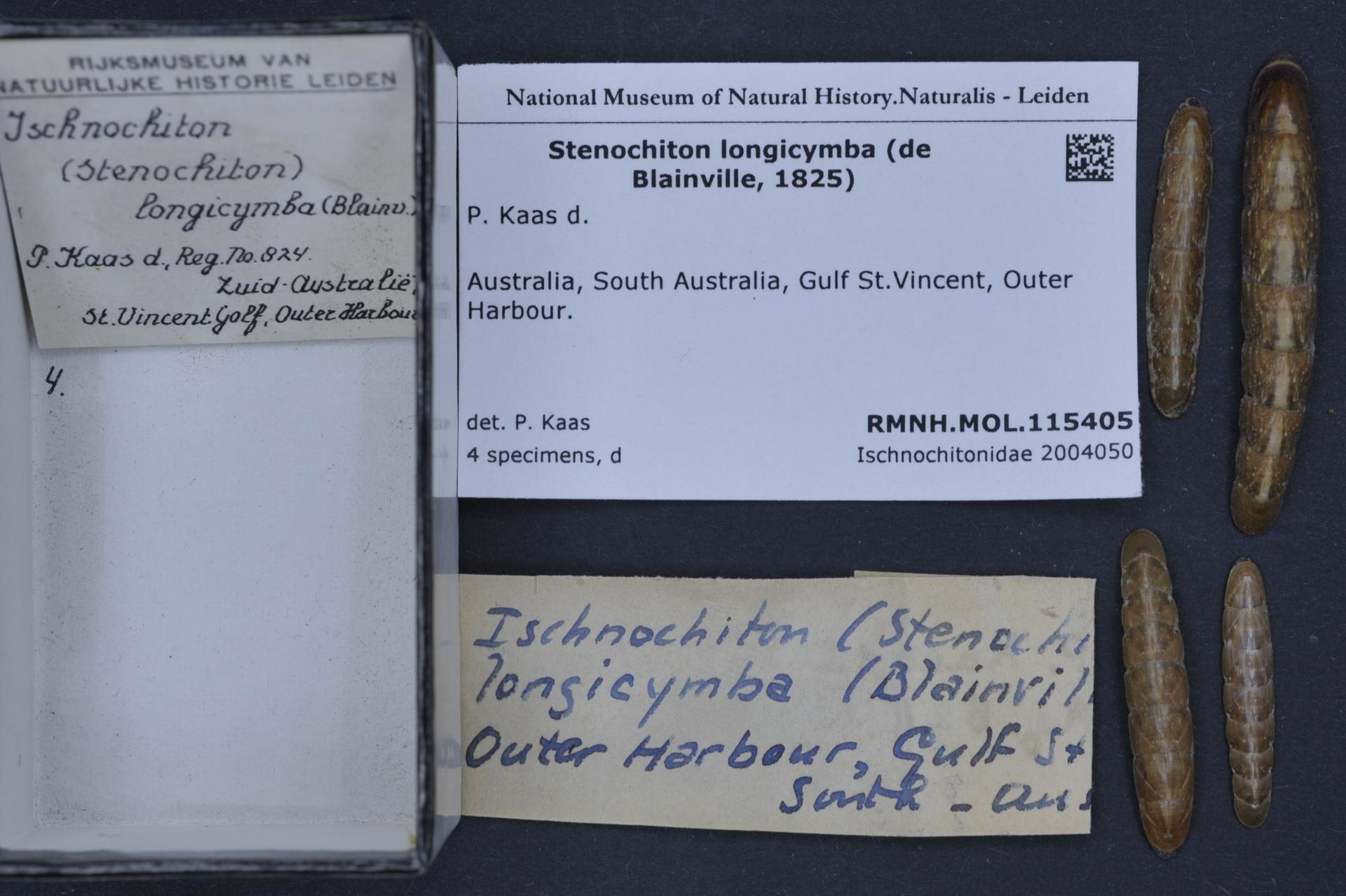
- Stenochiton longicymba

Scientific classification
- Kingdom: Animalia
- Phylum: Mollusca
- Class: Polyplacophora
- Order: Chitonida
- Family: Ischnochitonidae
- Genus: Stenochiton; H. Adams & Angas, 1864

Type species
- Stenochiton juloides H. Adams & Angas, 1864

Synonyms
- Ischnochiton (Stenochiton) H. Adams & Angas, 1864; Stenochiton (Zostericola) Ashby, 1919; Zostericola Ashby, 1919

= Stenochiton =

Genus of molluscs

Stenochiton is a genus of marine molluscs belonging to the class Polyplacophora in the family Ischnochitonidae.

== Species ==
- Stenochiton cymodocealis Ashby, 1918
- Stenochiton longicymba Blainville, 1825)
- Stenochiton nubilus (Cochran, 1993)
- Stenochiton pilsbryanus (Bednall, 1897)
