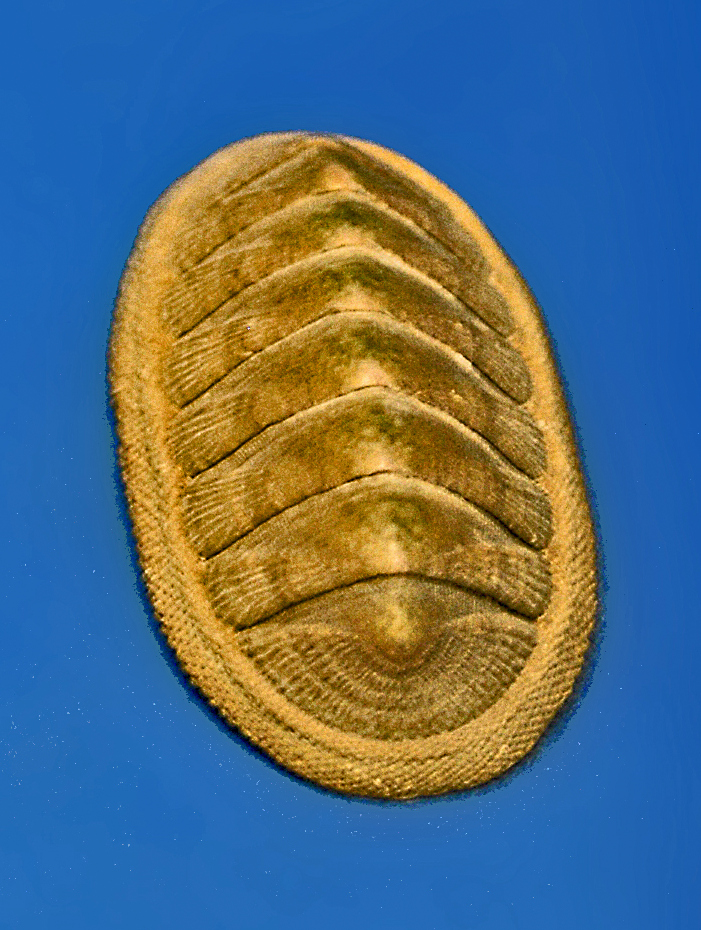
- Shell of Ischnochiton evanida

Scientific classification
- Domain: Eukaryota
- Kingdom: Animalia
- Phylum: Mollusca
- Class: Polyplacophora
- Order: Chitonida
- Family: Ischnochitonidae
- Subfamily: Ischnochitoninae
- Genus: Ischnochiton; Gray, 1847

Type species
- Chiton textilis Gray, 1828

Synonyms
- Anisoradsia Iredale & May, 1916; Autochiton Iredale & Hull, 1924; Chartoplax Iredale & Hull, 1924; Chiton (Ischnochiton) Gray, 1847; Chiton (Ischnoradsia) Shuttleworth, 1853 (original combination); Haploplax Pilsbry, 1894; Haploplax (Chartoplax) Iredale & Hull, 1925; Heterozona Carpenter [in Dall], 1879; Ischnochiton (Anisoradsia) Iredale & May, 1916; Ischnochiton (Chartoplax) Iredale & Hull, 1924; Ischnochiton (Haploplax) Pilsbry, 1894; Ischnochiton (Heterozona) Carpenter [in Dall], 1879· accepted, alternate representation; Ischnochiton (Ischnochiton) Gray, 1847· accepted, alternate representation; Ischnochiton (Ischnoradsia) Shuttleworth, 1853· accepted, alternate representation; Ischnochiton (Radsiella) Pilsbry, 1892; Ischnochiton (Simplischnochiton) Van Belle, 1974; Ischnoradsia Shuttleworth, 1853; Lepidoradsia Carpenter, 1879; Lophyropsis Thiele, 1893

= Ischnochiton =

Ischnochiton Temporal range: Eocene–Pliocene

Extinct genus of molluscs

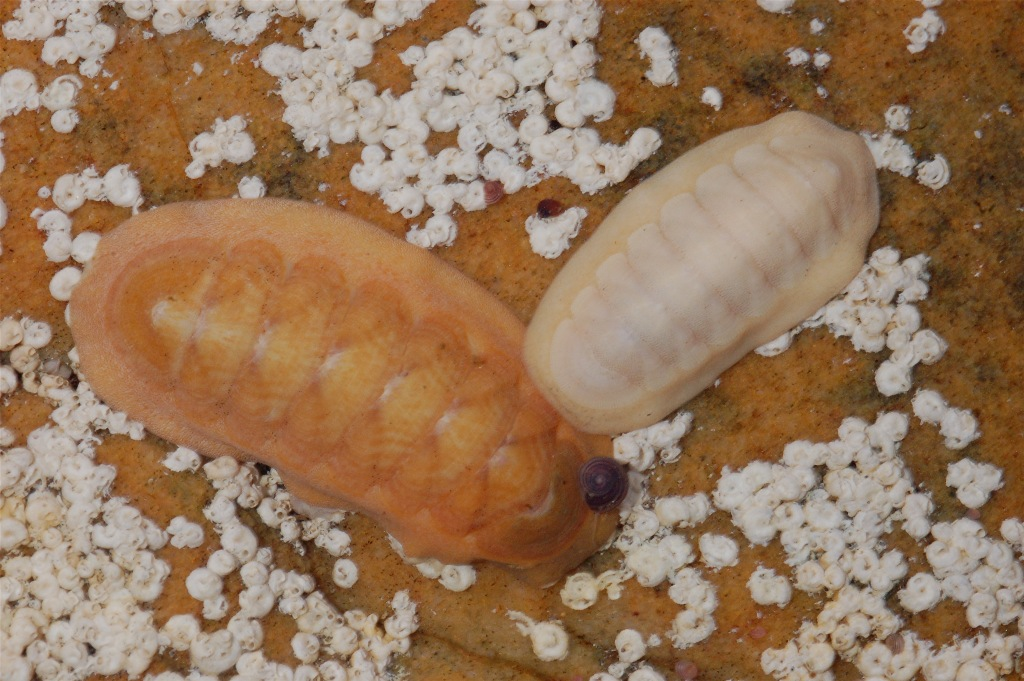
Ischnochiton spp. (unknown species) from South Africa

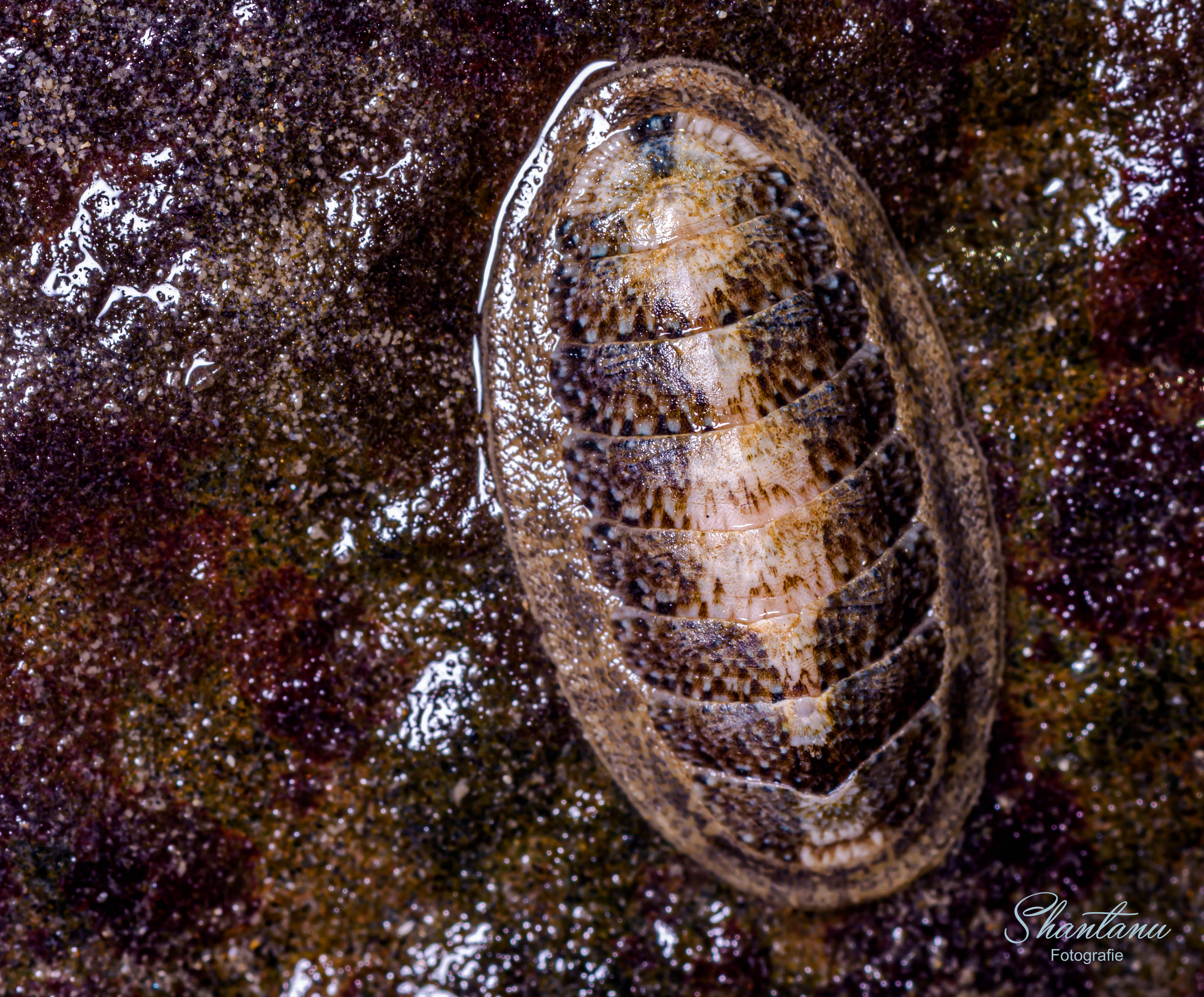
Ischnochiton winckworthi from western India (Mumbai)

Ischnochiton is a genus of polyplacophoran mollusc.

== Species ==
- † Ischnochiton abbessi (Cherns & Schwabe, 2019)
- Ischnochiton acomphus Hull & Risbec, 1930
- Ischnochiton adelaidensis (Reeve, 1847)
- Ischnochiton aidae Righi, 1973
- Ischnochiton alascensis Thiele, 1910
- Ischnochiton albinus Thiele, 1911
- Ischnochiton arbutum (Reeve, 1847)
- Ischnochiton australis (G. B. Sowerby II, 1840)
- Ischnochiton bergoti (Vélain, 1877)
- Ischnochiton bigranosus Kaas & Van Belle, 1990
- Ischnochiton boninensis Bergenhayn, 1933
- Ischnochiton bouryi Dupuis, 1917
- Ischnochiton broomensis Ashby & Cotton, 1934
- Ischnochiton caliginosus (Reeve, 1847)
- Ischnochiton carinulatus (Reeve, 1847)
- Ischnochiton cariosus Carpenter, 1879
- Ischnochiton carolianus Ferreira, 1984
- Ischnochiton cessaci (Rochebrune, 1881)
- Ischnochiton chaceorum Kaas & Van Belle, 1990
- Ischnochiton circumvallatus (Reeve, 1847)
- † Ischnochiton cliftonensis Ashby & Cotton, 1939
- Ischnochiton colubrifer (Reeve, 1848)
- Ischnochiton comptus (Gould, 1859)
- Ischnochiton contractus (Reeve, 1847)
- † Ischnochiton cossyrus Ashby & Cotton, 1939
- Ischnochiton crassus Kaas, 1985
- Ischnochiton crebristriatus Cochran, 1988
- † Ischnochiton crovatoi Dell'Angelo, Sosso & Bonfitto, 2019
- Ischnochiton dilatosculptus Kaas, 1982
- Ischnochiton dispar (G. B. Sowerby I, 1832)
- Ischnochiton distigmatus Hull, 1924
- Ischnochiton dorsuosus Haddon, 1886
- † Ischnochiton durius Ashby & Cotton, 1939
- Ischnochiton elizabethensis Pilsbry, 1894
- Ischnochiton elongatus (Blainville, 1825)
- Ischnochiton erythronotus (C. B. Adams, 1845) – multihued chiton
- Ischnochiton evanida G.B. Sowerby II, 1840
- Ischnochiton examinandus Hull, 1923
- Ischnochiton falcatus Hull, 1912
- † Ischnochiton fehsei Cherns & Schwabe, 2019
- Ischnochiton feliduensis E. A. Smith, 1903
- Ischnochiton fraternus Thiele, 1909
- Ischnochiton fruticosus (Gould, 1846)
- Ischnochiton gallensis Knorre, 1925
- Ischnochiton goreensis Thiele, 1909
- Ischnochiton goudi Kaas, 1996
- Ischnochiton granulifer Thiele, 1909
- Ischnochiton guatemalensis Thiele, 1909
- Ischnochiton hakodadensis Carpenter, 1893
- Ischnochiton hartmeyeri Thiele, 1910 – multiringed chiton
- Ischnochiton hayamii Owada, 2018
- Ischnochiton indianus Leloup, 1981
- Ischnochiton indifferens Thiele, 1911
- Ischnochiton intermedius Hedley & Hull, 1912
- Ischnochiton kaasi Ferreira, 1987
- Ischnochiton keili Plate, 1899
- † Ischnochiton korytnicensis Bałuk, 1971
- Ischnochiton lentiginosus (G. B. Sowerby II, 1840)
- † Ischnochiton ligusticus Dell'Angelo, Sosso, Prudenza & Bonfitto, 2013
- Ischnochiton lineolatus (Blainville, 1825)
- Ischnochiton lividus
- Ischnochiton lopesi Kaas, 1974
- Ischnochiton luteoroseus Suter, 1907
- Ischnochiton luticolens Hull, 1923
- Ischnochiton macleani Ferreira, 1978
- Ischnochiton manazuruensis Owada, 2016
- Ischnochiton maorianus Iredale, 1914
- Ischnochiton mawlei Iredale & May, 1916
- Ischnochiton mayi Pilsbry, 1895
- Ischnochiton melinus Dall, 1926
- Ischnochiton mitsukurii Pilsbry, 1898
- Ischnochiton muscarius (Reeve, 1847)
- † Ischnochiton neglectus Ashby & Cotton, 1939
- Ischnochiton newcombi Pilsbry, 1892
- Ischnochiton nicklesi Kaas & van Belle, 1990
- † Ischnochiton nitidus Dell'Angelo, Landau, Van Dingenen & Ceulemans, 2018
- Ischnochiton niveus Ferreira, 1987
- † Ischnochiton numantius Ashby & Cotton, 1939
- Ischnochiton obtusus Carpenter, 1893
- Ischnochiton oniscus (Krauss, 1848)
- Ischnochiton paessleri Thiele, 1909
- Ischnochiton papillosus (C. B. Adams, 1845)
- Ischnochiton paululus Is. Taki, 1938
- Ischnochiton perornatus Carpenter, 1892
- Ischnochiton pilsbryi Bednall, 1897
- Ischnochiton poppei Kaas & Van Belle, 1994
- Ischnochiton pseudovirgatus Kaas, 1972 – blue-spot chiton
- Ischnochiton ptychius Pilsbry, 1894
- Ischnochiton punctulatissimus (G. B. Sowerby I, 1832)
- Ischnochiton purpurascens
- Ischnochiton purus Sykes, 1896
- Ischnochiton pusillus (G. B. Sowerby I, 1832)
- Ischnochiton pusio (Sowerby in Sow. & Brod., 1832)
- Ischnochiton quoyanus Thiele, 1909
- † Ischnochiton renardi Dell'Angelo, Lesport, Cluzaud & Sosso, 2018
- Ischnochiton rhodolithophilus R. N. Clark, 2000
- Ischnochiton rissoi (Payraudeau, 1826)
- Ischnochiton sansibarensis Thiele, 1909
- Ischnochiton sererorum (Rochebrune, 1881)
- Ischnochiton smaragdinus (Angas, 1867)
- Ischnochiton stramineus (G. B. Sowerby I, 1832)
- Ischnochiton striolatus (J. E. Gray, 1828)
- Ischnochiton subviridis (Iredale & May, 1916)
- Ischnochiton tenuisculptus (Carpenter, 1863)
- Ischnochiton textilis (Gray, 1828)
- Ischnochiton thomasi Bednall, 1897
- Ischnochiton tindalei Ashby, 1924
- † Ischnochiton tisurus Ashby & Cotton, 1939
- Ischnochiton tomhalei R. N. Clark, 2000
- Ischnochiton torri Iredale & May, 1916
- Ischnochiton tridentatus Pilsbry, 1893
- Ischnochiton usticensis Dell'Angelo & Castriota, 1999
- Ischnochiton variegatus (H. Adams & Angas, 1864)
- † Ischnochiton vectensis Wrigley, 1943
- Ischnochiton verconis Torr, 1911
- Ischnochiton versicolor (G. B. Sowerby II, 1840)
- † Ischnochiton vetustus Powell & Bartrum, 1929
- Ischnochiton victoria Ferreira, 1987
- † Ischnochiton vinazus Ashby & Cotton, 1939
- Ischnochiton virgatus (Reeve, 1848)
- Ischnochiton viridulus (Gould, 1846)
- Ischnochiton weedingi Milne, 1958
- Ischnochiton wilsoni Sykes, 1896
- Ischnochiton winckworthi Leloup, 1936
- Ischnochiton yerburyi (E. A. Smith, 1891)
- † Ischnochiton zbyi Dell'Angelo & da Silva, 2003
- Ischnochiton (Ischnochiton) sirenkoi Dell'Angelo, Prelle, Sosso & Bonfitto, 2011
- Ischnochiton (Ischnochiton) yemenensis Van Belle & Wranik, 1991

Species brought into synonymy

- Ischnochiton abyssicola Smith & Cowan, 1966: synonym of Tripoplax abyssicola (A. G. Smith & Cowan, 1966) (original combination)
- Ischnochiton albus (Linnaeus, 1767): synonym of Stenosemus albus (Linnaeus, 1767)
- Ischnochiton exaratus (G. O. Sars, 1878): synonym of Stenosemus exaratus (Sars G. O., 1878)
- Ischnochiton floridanus Pilsbry, 1892: synonym of Stenoplax floridana (Pilsbry, 1892) (original combination)
- Ischnochiton mawsoni Cotton, 1937: synonym of Ischnochiton luteoroseus Suter, 1907
- Ischnochiton pectinatus Carpenter, 1864: synonym of Lepidozona pectinulata (Carpenter in Pilsbry, 1893) (nomen nudum)
- Ischnochiton retiporosus Carpenter, 1864: synonym of Lepidozona retiporosa (Carpenter, 1864) (original combination)
- Ischnochiton ritteri(Dall, 1919): synonym of Tripoplax trifida (Carpenter, 1864)
- Ischnochiton ruber (Linnaeus, 1767): synonym of Boreochiton ruber (Linnaeus, 1767)
- Ischnochiton scrobiculatus (Middendorff, 1847): synonym of Lepidozona scrobiculata (Middendorff, 1847)
