= Subterenochiton =

Scientific classification
- Kingdom: Animalia
- Phylum: Mollusca
- Class: Polyplacophora
- Order: Chitonida
- Family: Ischnochitonidae
- Genus: Subterenochiton; Iredale et Hull, 1924

Genus of molluscs

Subterenochiton is a genus of chitons, marine polyplacophoran molluscs, in the family Ischnochitonidae.

== Species ==
- Subterenochiton gabrieli
