= Simplischnochiton =

Simplischnochiton Temporal range: Miocene–Pliocene

Scientific classification
- Domain: Eukaryota
- Kingdom: Animalia
- Phylum: Mollusca
- Class: Polyplacophora
- Order: Chitonida
- Family: Ischnochitonidae
- Subfamily: Ischnochitoninae
- Genus: Simplischnochiton

Extinct genus of molluscs

Simplischnochiton is a genus of polyplacophoran molluscs.
