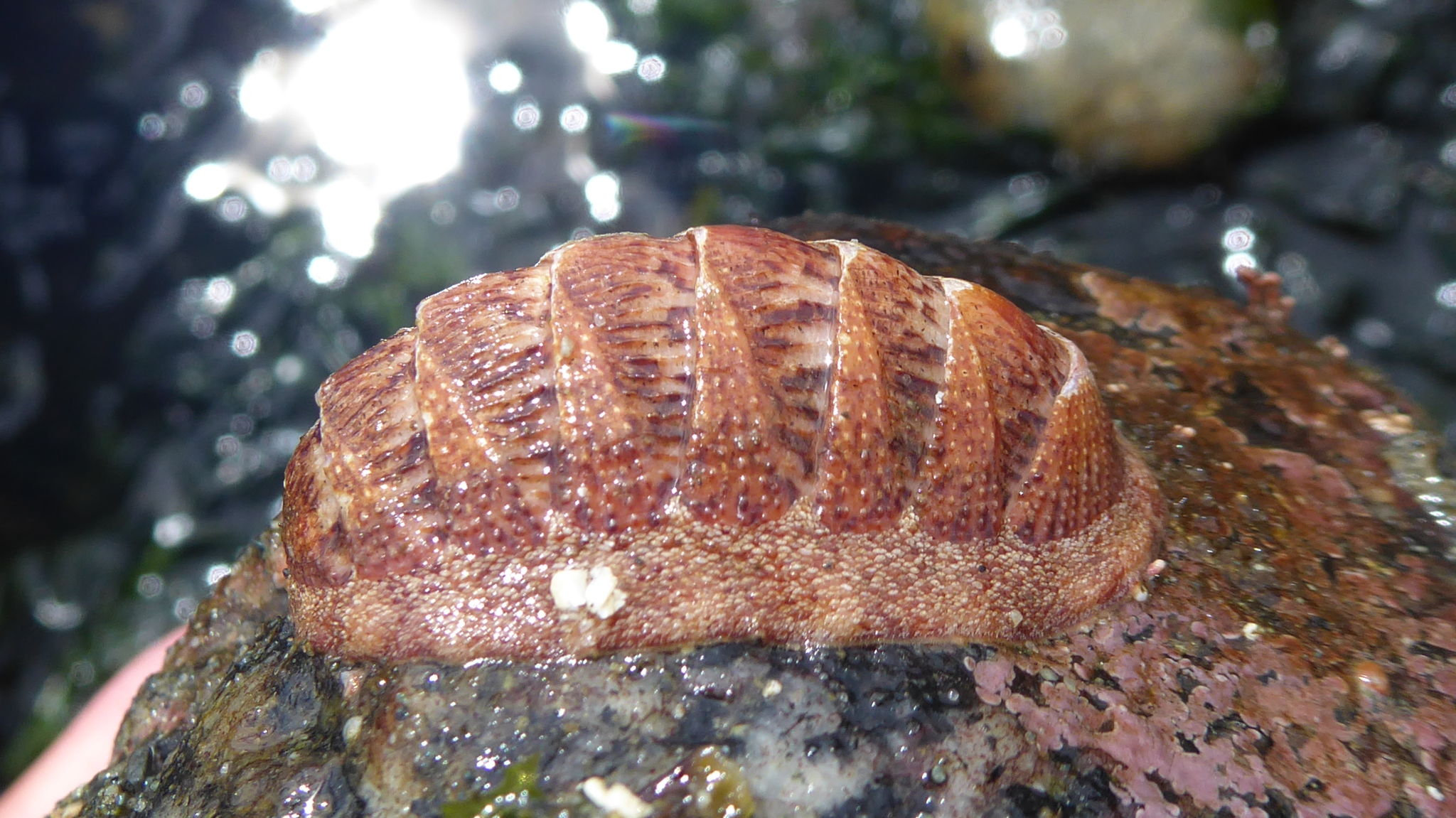
- Lepidozona mertensii

Scientific classification
- Kingdom: Animalia
- Phylum: Mollusca
- Class: Polyplacophora
- Order: Chitonida
- Family: Ischnochitonidae
- Genus: Lepidozona; Pilsbry, 1892

= Lepidozona =

Genus of molluscs

Lepidozona is a genus of chitons belonging to the family Ischnochitonidae.

The species of this genus are found on the coasts of Pacific Ocean.

== Species ==
The following species are recognised in the genus Lepidozona:

- Lepidozona acostata Sirenko, 2016
- Lepidozona allynsmithi A. J. Ferreira, 1974
- Lepidozona amabilis (S. S. Berry, 1917)
- Lepidozona bisculpta (P. P. Carpenter, 1892)
- Lepidozona christiaensi Van Belle, 1982
- Lepidozona clarionensis A. J. Ferreira, 1983
- Lepidozona clathrata (Reeve, 1847)
- Lepidozona cooperi (P. P. Carpenter in Dall, 1879)
- Lepidozona coreanica (Reeve, 1847)
- Lepidozona craticulata (Gould, 1859)
- Lepidozona crockeri (Willett in Hertlein & A. M. Strong, 1951)
- Lepidozona excellens Sirenko, 2016
- Lepidozona ferreirai Kaas & Van Belle, 1987
- Lepidozona formosa A. J. Ferreira, 1974
- Lepidozona guadalupensis A. J. Ferreira, 1978
- Lepidozona hyotanseana S.-K. Wu & Okutani, 1986
- Lepidozona interfossa (S. S. Berry, 1917)
- Lepidozona interstincta (Gould, 1852)
- Lepidozona iyoensis (Is. Taki & Iw. Taki, 1929)
- Lepidozona laurae A. J. Ferreira, 1985
- Lepidozona luzanovkensis Sirenko, 2021 †
- Lepidozona luzonica (G. B. Sowerby II, 1842)
- Lepidozona mertensii (Middendorff, 1847)
- Lepidozona multigranosa Sirenko, 1975
- Lepidozona nipponica (S. S. Berry, 1918)
- Lepidozona pectinulata (P. P. Carpenter, 1893)
- Lepidozona radians (P. P. Carpenter, 1892)
- Lepidozona reevei Kaas & Van Belle, 1987
- Lepidozona retiporosa (P. P. Carpenter, 1864)
- Lepidozona rothi A. J. Ferreira, 1983
- Lepidozona scabricostata (P. P. Carpenter, 1864)
- Lepidozona scrobiculata (Middendorff, 1847)
- Lepidozona serrata (P. P. Carpenter, 1864)
- Lepidozona sirenkoi Kaas & Van Belle, 1990
- Lepidozona skoglundi (A. J. Ferreira, 1986)
- Lepidozona sorsogonensis Kaas & Van Belle, 1987
- Lepidozona stohleri A. J. Ferreira, 1985
- Lepidozona subtilis S. S. Berry, 1956
- Lepidozona tenuicostata Kaas & Van Belle, 1990
- Lepidozona vietnamensis Strack, 1991
- Lepidozona willetti (S. S. Berry, 1917)
