= Schizoplacidae =

Scientific classification
- Domain: Eukaryota
- Kingdom: Animalia
- Phylum: Mollusca
- Class: Polyplacophora
- Order: Chitonida
- Family: Schizoplacidae

Family of molluscs

Schizoplacidae is a family of chitons belonging to the order Chitonida.

Genera:

- Schizoplax Dall, 1878
