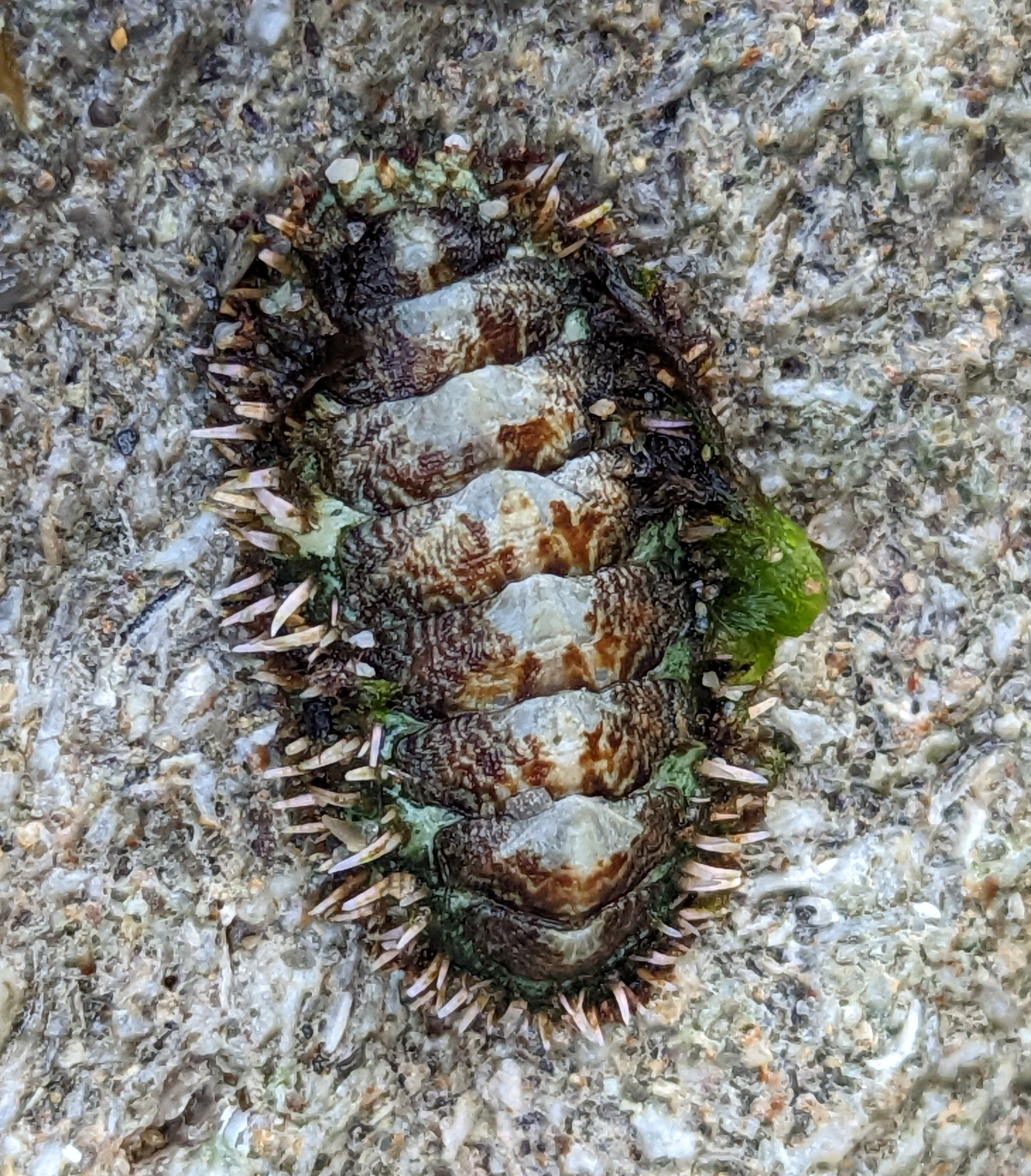
- Ceratozona squalida

Scientific classification
- Kingdom: Animalia
- Phylum: Mollusca
- Class: Polyplacophora
- Order: Chitonida
- Family: Callistoplacidae; Pilsbry, 1893

Synonyms
- Callistoplacinae Pilsbry, 1893

= Callistoplacidae =

Family of molluscs

Callistoplacidae is a family of chitons belonging to the order Chitonida.

== Genera ==
The following genera are recognised in the family Callistoplacidae:

- Callistochiton Carpenter
- Callistoplax Carpenter
- Calloplax Thiele, 1909
- Caribbochiton Sirenko & B. Anseeuw, 2021
- Ceratozona Dall, 1882
- Ischnoplax Dall, 1879
