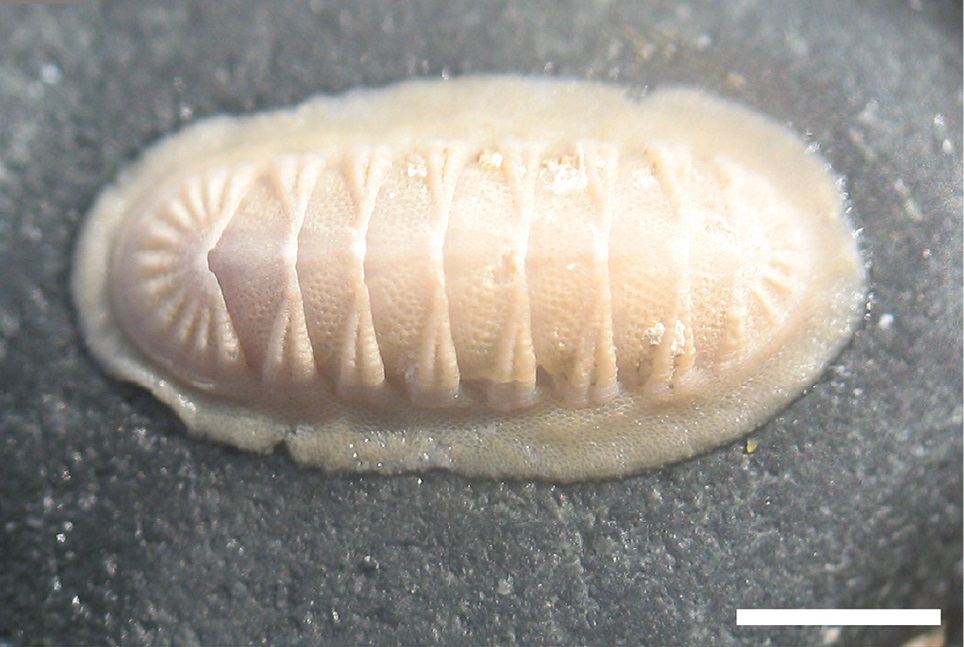
- Callistochiton pulchellus found in Playa el Pulpo, Chile. Scale bar = 2 cm

Scientific classification
- Domain: Eukaryota
- Kingdom: Animalia
- Phylum: Mollusca
- Class: Polyplacophora
- Order: Chitonida
- Family: Ischnochitonidae
- Subfamily: Ischnochitoninae
- Genus: Callistochiton; Dall, 1879

Species
- Callistochiton adenensis (E. A. Smith, 1891); Callistochiton aepynotus Dall, 1919; Callistochiton antiquus (Reeve, 1847); Callistochiton ashbyi (Barnard, 1963); Callistochiton asthenes (Berry, 1919); Callistochiton augustensis Ashby & Cotton, 1937; Callistochiton barnardi Leloup, 1981; Callistochiton belliatus Kaas & Van Belle, 1994; Callistochiton biakensis Kaas & Van Belle, 1994; Callistochiton broomensis Ashby & Cotton, 1934; Callistochiton clenchi Ashby & Cotton, 1934; Callistochiton colimensis (A. G. Smith, 1961); Callistochiton crassicostatus Pilsbry, 1893; Callistochiton crosslandi Sykes, 1907; Callistochiton decoratus Carpenter MS, Pilsbry, 1893; Callistochiton elenensis (Sowerby in Broderip & Sowerby, 1832); Callistochiton expressus (Carpenter, 1865); Callistochiton generos (Iredale & Hull, 1925); Callistochiton granifer Hull, 1923; Callistochiton indicus Leloup, 1953; Callistochiton jacobaeus (Gould, 1859); Callistochiton laticostatus Kaas & Van Belle, 1994; Callistochiton leei Ferreira, 1979; Callistochiton mawlei Iredale & May, 1916; Callistochiton occiduus Ashby & Cotton, 1934; Callistochiton omanensis Kaas & Van Belle, 1994; Callistochiton pachylasmae (Monterosato, 1879); Callistochiton palmulatus Carpenter MS, Dall, 1879; Callistochiton philippinarum Thiele, 1909; Callistochiton porosus Nierstrasz, 1905; Callistochiton portobelensis Ferreira, 1976; Callistochiton pulchellus (Gray, 1828); Callistochiton pulchrior Carpenter MS, Pilsbry, 1893; Callistochiton righii Kaas & Van Belle, 1994; Callistochiton rotondus Leloup, 1981; Callistochiton shuttleworthianus Pilsbry, 1893; Callistochiton squamigercostatus Kaas & Van Belle, 1994

= Callistochiton =

Callistochiton Temporal range: Miocene–Pliocene

Extinct genus of molluscs

Callistochiton is a genus of polyplacophoran molluscs, alive today, of which fossils are known from the Pliocene period onwards.
