= Choriplacidae =

Scientific classification
- Domain: Eukaryota
- Kingdom: Animalia
- Phylum: Mollusca
- Class: Polyplacophora
- Order: Chitonida
- Family: Choriplacidae

Family of molluscs

Choriplacidae is a family of chitons belonging to the order Chitonida.

Genera:

- Choriplax Pilsbry, 1894
- Plasiochiton Hoare, 2000
