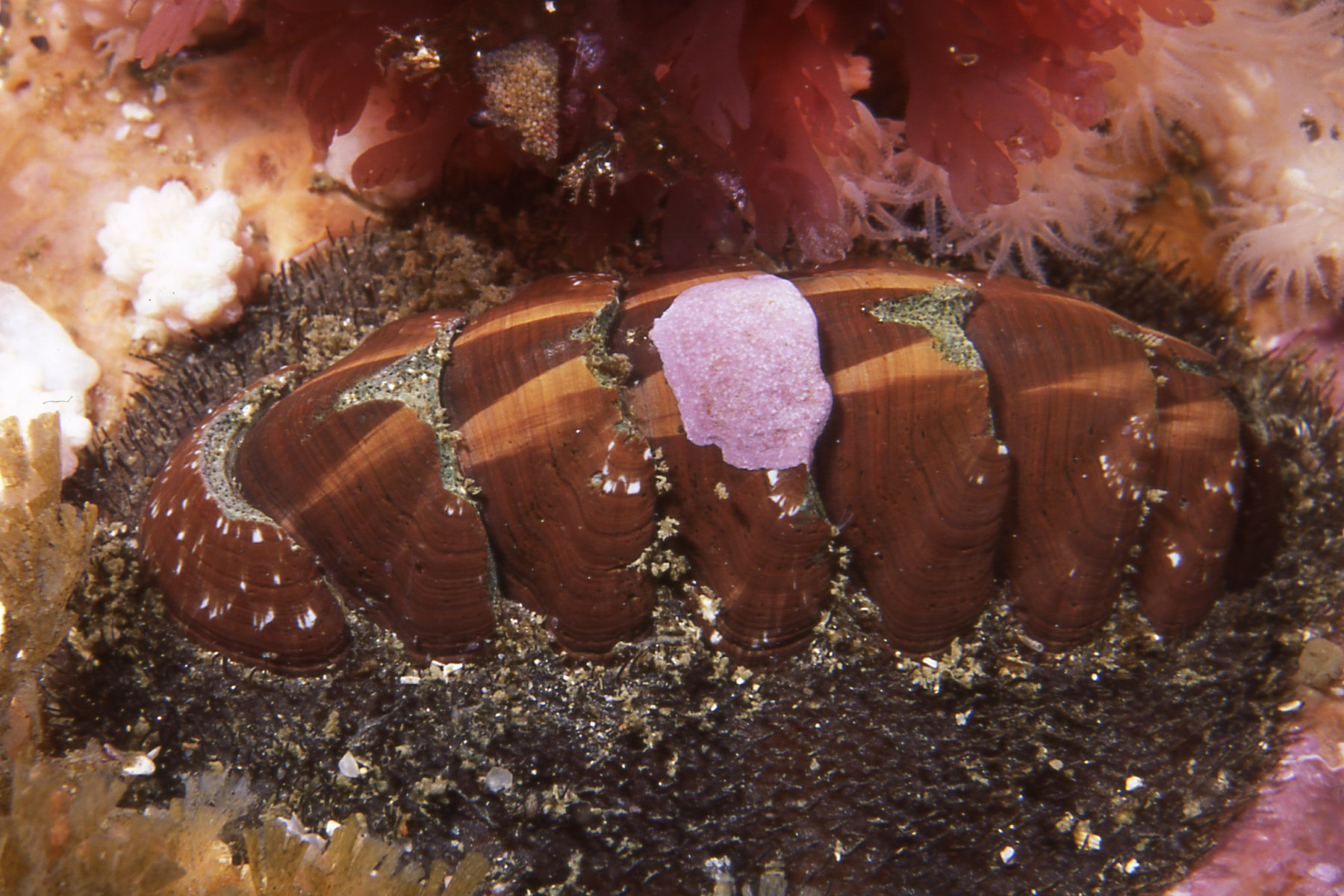
- Chaetopleura papilio

Scientific classification
- Domain: Eukaryota
- Kingdom: Animalia
- Phylum: Mollusca
- Class: Polyplacophora
- Order: Chitonida
- Suborder: Chitonina

Families
- Ischnochitonidae; Mopaliidae; Schizochitonidae; Chitonidae

= Chitonina =

Extinct suborder of molluscs

Chitonina is a suborder of polyplacophoran mollusc belonging to the order Chitonida.

== Superfamilies ==
The suborder includes both living and extinct species.

- Chitonoidea Rafinesque, 1815
- Schizochitonoidea Dall, 1889
