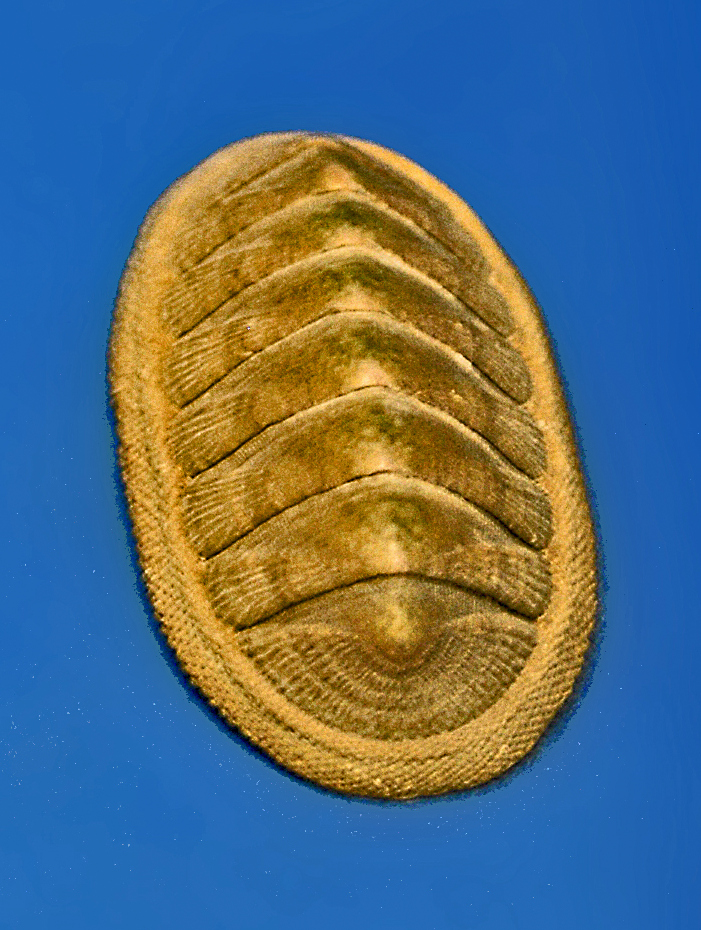
- Shell of Ischnochiton evanida

Scientific classification
- Domain: Eukaryota
- Kingdom: Animalia
- Phylum: Mollusca
- Class: Polyplacophora
- Subclass: Neoloricata
- Order: Chitonida
- Suborder: Chitonina
- Family: Ischnochitonidae; Dall, 1889

Synonyms
- Subterenochitonidae

= Ischnochitonidae =

Family of molluscs

Ischnochitonidae is a family of polyplacophoran mollusc belonging to the superfamily Chitonoidea.

== Subfamilies and genera ==
- Ischnochitoninae Dall, 1889
  - Callistochiton Dall, 1879: belongs to the family Callistoplacidae
  - Simplischnochiton Van Belle, 1974: synonym of Ischnochiton Gray, 1847
  - Lepidozona Pilsbry, 1892
  - Radsiella Pilsbry, 1892
  - Stenochiton H. Adams & Angas, 1864
  - Stenoplax Dall, 1879
  - Stenosemus Middendorff, 1847
  - Subterenochiton Iredale & Hull, 1924
  - Thermochiton Saito & Okutani, 1990
  - Tonicina Thiele, 1906
  - Tripoplax S. S. Berry, 1919
- Callistoplacinae Pilsbry, 1893raised to family level Callistoplacidae Pilsbry, 1893
- Callochitoninae: raised to family levelCallochitonidae Plate, 1901
- Lepidochitoninae Iredale, 1914: synonym of Tonicellinae Simroth, 1894

Not belonging to a subfamily

- Bathychiton Dell'Angelo & Palazzi, 1988
- Connexochiton Kaas, 1979
- Ischnochiton Gray, 1847

== Synonyms ==
- Anisoradsia Iredale & May, 1916: synonym of Ischnochiton Gray, 1847
- Autochiton Iredale & Hull, 1924: synonym of Ischnochiton Gray, 1847
- Basiliochiton S. S. Berry, 1918: synonym of Dendrochiton S. S. Berry, 1911
- Chartoplax Iredale & Hull, 1924: synonym of Ischnochiton Gray, 1847
- Chondropleura Thiele, 1906: synonym of Stenosemus Middendorff, 1847
- Gurjanovillia Yakovleva, 1952: synonym of Tripoplax S. S. Berry, 1919 (junior synonym)
- Haploplax Pilsbry, 1894: synonym ofIschnochiton Gray, 1847 (synonym)
- Heterozona Carpenter [in Dall], 1879: synonym of Ischnochiton (Heterozona) Carpenter [in Dall], 1879 represented as Ischnochiton Gray, 1847
- Ischnoradsia Shuttleworth, 1853: synonym of Ischnochiton (Ischnoradsia) Shuttleworth, 1853 represented as Ischnochiton Gray, 1847
- Lepidopleuroides Thiele, 1928: synonym of Stenosemus Middendorff, 1847 (objective synonym)
- Lepidoradsia Carpenter, 1879: synonym of Ischnoradsia Shuttleworth, 1853: synonym of Ischnochiton (Ischnoradsia) Shuttleworth, 1853 represented as Ischnochiton Gray, 1847
- Lophochiton Ashby, 1923: synonym of Callistochiton Carpenter [in Dall], 1879 (junior synonym)
- Lophyropsis Thiele, 1893: synonym ofIschnochiton Gray, 1847
- Lophyrochiton Yakovleva, 1952: synonym of Stenosemus Middendorff, 1847 (objective synonym)
- Lophyrus G.O. Sars, 1878: synonym of Stenosemus Middendorff, 1847
- Maugerella Carpenter [in Dall], 1879: synonym of Stenoplax Carpenter, 1879
- Ocellochiton Ashby, 1939: synonym of Callochiton Gray, 1847
- Paricoplax Iredale & Hull, 1929: synonym of Callochiton Gray, 1847
- Stenoradsia Carpenter [in Dall], 1879: synonym of Stenoplax (Stenoradsia) Carpenter in Dall, 1879 represented as Stenoplax Carpenter, 1879 (original combination)
- Variolepis Plate, 1899: synonym of Chaetopleura Shuttleworth, 1853
- Zostericola Ashby, 1919: synonym of Stenochiton H. Adams & Angas, 1864
