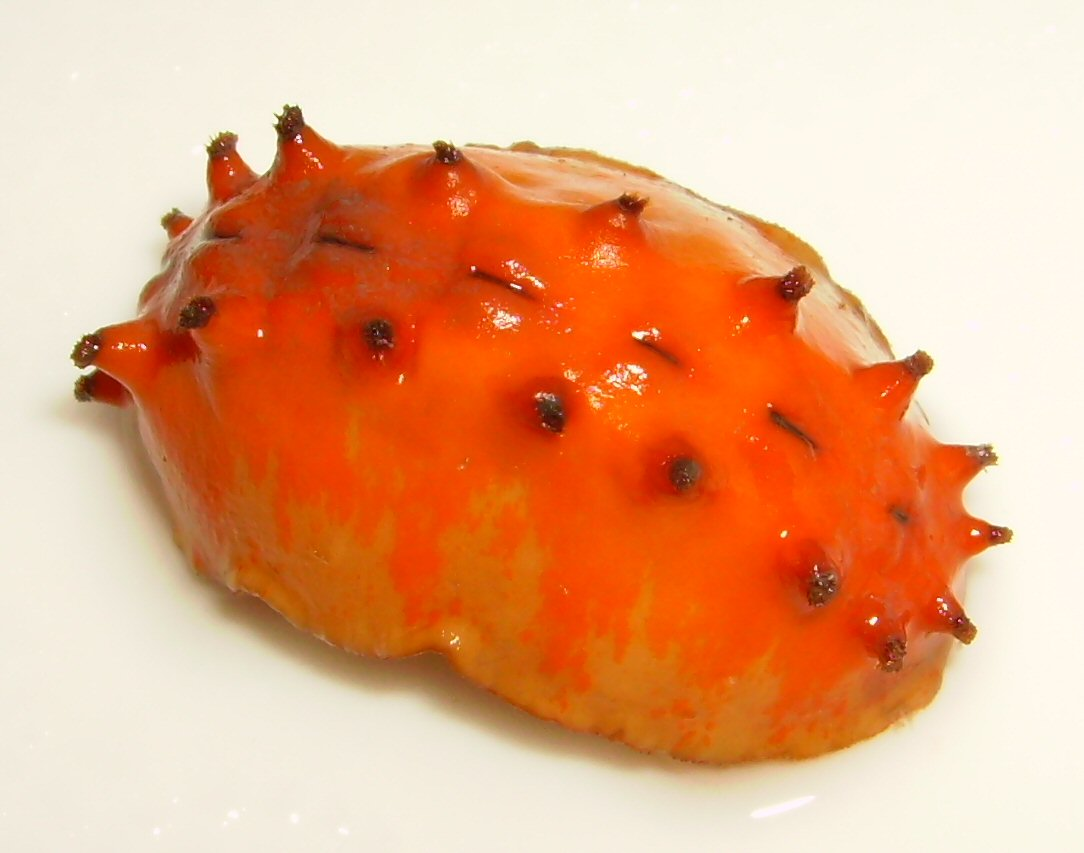

Scientific classification
- Domain: Eukaryota
- Kingdom: Animalia
- Phylum: Mollusca
- Class: Polyplacophora
- Subclass: Neoloricata
- Order: Chitonida; Thiele, 1910

Families
- See text

= Chitonida =

Order of molluscs

Chitonida is an order of chitons. The order was erected to class chitons with elaborate hull outgrowths on their eggs.

== Taxonomy ==
- Acanthochitonidae Pilsbry, 1893
- Callistoplacidae Pilsbry, 1893
- Callochitonidae Plate, 1901
- Chaetopleuridae Plate, 1899
- Chitonidae Rafinesque, 1815
- Choriplacidae Ashby, 1928
- Cryptoplacidae Adams & Adams, 1858
- Hemiarthridae Sirenko, 1997
- Ischnochitonidae Dall, 1889
- Mopaliidae Dall, 1889
- †Ochmazochitonidae Hoare et Smith, 1984
- Schizochitonidae Dall, 1889
- Schizoplacidae Bergenhayn, 1955
- Tonicellidae Simroth, 1894
