= List of marine molluscs of South Africa =

List of saltwater species that form a part of the molluscan fauna of South Africa

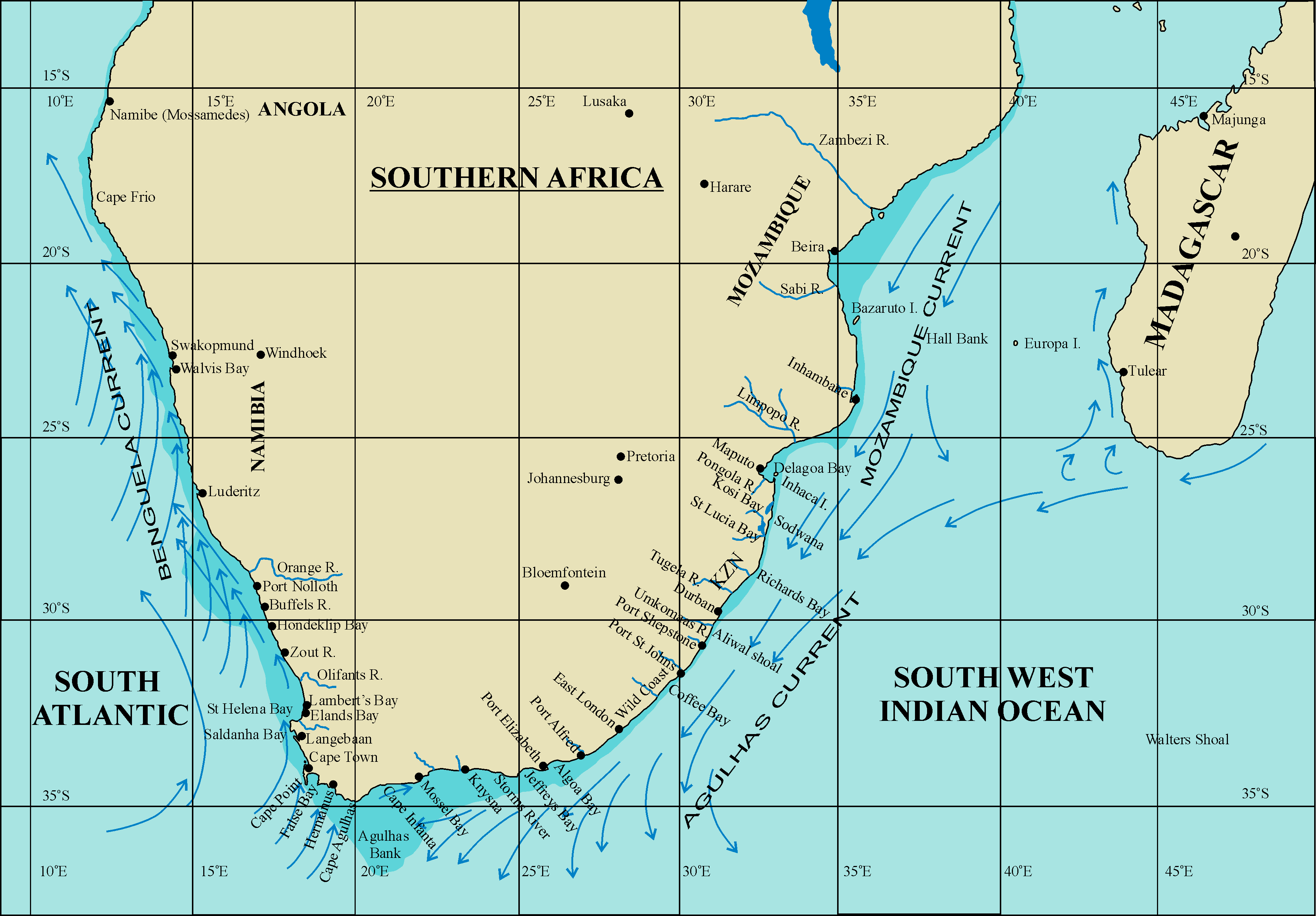
Map of the Southern African coastline showing some of the landmarks referred to in species range statements

The list of marine molluscs of South Africa is a list of saltwater species that form a part of the molluscan fauna of South Africa. This list does not include the land or freshwater molluscs.

The convergence of the Benguela and Agulhas currents creates a rich diversity of molluscs, making the intertidal area fascinating for conchologists.

Mollusca is a phylum of protostomic invertebrate animals, whose members are known as molluscs or mollusks (/ˈmɒləsks/). 89,857 extant species of molluscs are recognized with estimates ranging over 251,000 species, making it the second-largest animal phylum after Arthropoda. The number of recognized fossil species is 57,219 with estimates between 60,000 and 100,000, and the proportion of undescribed extant species is very high. Many taxa remain poorly studied.

Molluscs are the largest marine phylum, comprising about 23% of all the named marine organisms. They are highly diverse, not just in size and anatomical structure, but also in behavior and habitat, as numerous groups are freshwater and even terrestrial species. The phylum is typically divided into 7 or 8 taxonomic classes, of which two are entirely extinct. Cephalopod molluscs, such as squid, cuttlefish, and octopuses, are among the most neurologically advanced of all invertebrates—and either the giant squid or the colossal squid is the largest known extant invertebrate species. The gastropods (snails, slugs and abalone) are by far the most diverse class and account for 80% of the total classified molluscan species. (Full article...)

== Gastropoda ==
See List of marine gastropods of South Africa

== Bivalvia ==
Bivalves in South Africa include:

Nuculidae

- Nucula nucleus Linnaeus, 1758

Mytilidae – Mussels

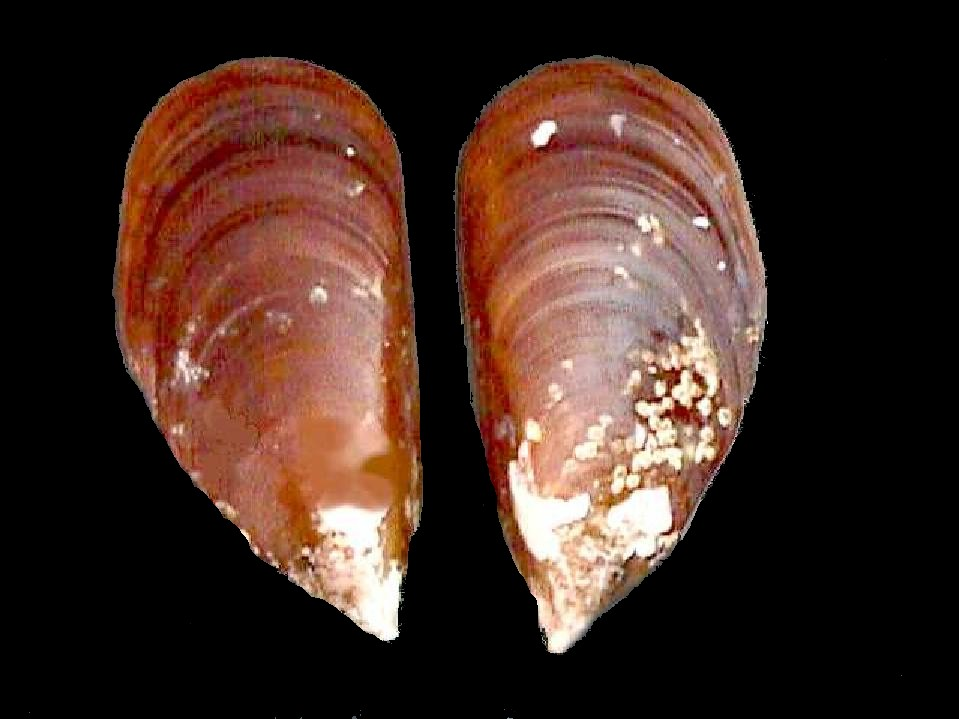
Perna perna

- Estuarine mussel Arcuatula capensis (Cape Agulhas to Mozambique)
- Ribbed mussel Aulacomya ater (Namibia to Eastern Cape)
- Brack-water mussel Brachidontes virgiliae (Eastern Cape to Mozambique)
- Semistriated mussel Brachidontes semistriatus (Port Elizabeth to Mozambique)
- Black mussel Choromytilus meridionalis (Namibia to Tsitsikamma)
- Half-hairy mussel Gregariella petagnae (Namibia to central KwaZulu-Natal)
- Ear mussel Modiolus auriculatus (Port Elizabeth to Mozambique)
- Mediterranean mussel Mytilus galloprovincialis (Orange river to Eastern Cape)
- Brown mussel Perna perna (Cape Point to Mozambique)
- Ledge mussel Septifer bilocularis (Port Elizabeth to Mozambique)

Arcidae – Ark clams

- Arca avellana Lamarck, 1819 (Port Elizabeth to Mozambique)
- Arca navicularis Brughiere, 1789
- Arca tortuosa Linnaeus 1758
- Barbatia candida (Helbling, 1779) syn. Arca helblingi
- Oblique ark shell Barbatia obliquata (Cape Columbine to Mozambique)

Noetiidae

- Striarca symmetrica (Port Elizabeth to Mozambique)

Pinnidae – Pen shells

- Horse mussel Atrina squamifera (Cape Columbine to Eastern Cape)
- Pinna muricata (Port Elizabeth to Mozambique)

Gryphaeidae

- Hyotissa numisma (Transkei to Mozambique)

Ostreidae – True oysters

- Weed oyster Ostrea algoensis Sowerby, 1871
- Ostrea atherstonei (Saldanha Bay to KwaZulu-Natal south coast)
- Natal rock oyster Saccostrea cuccullata (Port Elizabeth to Mozambique) (syn. Crassostrea cuccullata)
- Cape rock oyster Striostrea margaritacea (Cape Point to Mozambique)

Anomiidae – Saddle oysters

- Saddle oyster Anomia achaeus (Port Elizabeth to Mozambique)

Gryphaeidae – Honeycomb oysters

- Hyotissa numisma

Pteriidae – Pearl oysters

- Cape pearl oyster Pinctada capensis (Cape Agulhas to Mozambique)

Pectinidae – Scallops

- Dwarf fan shell Chlamys tincta (Cape Columbine to Mozambique)
- Scallop Pecten sulcicostatus (Cape Point to Eastern Cape)

Limidae – File shells

- File shell Limaria tuberculata (Cape Columbine to KwaZulu-Natal south coast)

Cardiidae – Cockles

- Cockle Trachycardium flavum (Central KwaZulu-Natal to Mozambique)
- Trachycardium rubicundum (Eastern Transkei to Mozambique)

Tridacnidae – Giant clams

- Giant clam Tridacna squamosa (Northern KwaZulu-Natal to Mozambique)
- Tridacna maxima (Zululand)

Mactridae – Trough shells

- Otter shell Lutraria lutraria (Namibia to Eastern Cape)
- Smooth trough shell Mactra glabrata (Cape Columbine to Mozambique)
- Angular surf clam Scissodesma spengleri (Cape Point to Eastern Cape)

Carditidae

- Rectangular false cockle Cardita variegata (Mossel Bay to Mozambique)
- Dead man's hands Thecalia concamerata (Port Nolloth to Transkei)

Condylocardiidae

- Rough false cockle Carditella rugosa (Mossel Bay to central KwaZulu-Natal)
- Carditella capensis (West coast)

Solenidae

- Pencil bait Solen capensis (Namaqualand to Eastern Cape)
- Solen cylindraceus (Transkei to Mozambique)

Lucinidae

- Smooth platter shell Loripes clausus Philippi 1848 (Mossel Bay to Mozambique)

Unionidae

- Toothless platter shell Anodontia edentula Linnaeus 1758 (Mossel Bay to Mozambique)

Lasaeidae

- Dwarf rusty clam Lasaea adansoni turtoni (Cape Point to Mozambique) Gmelin 1791
- Tellimya trigona (West coast)

Tellinidae

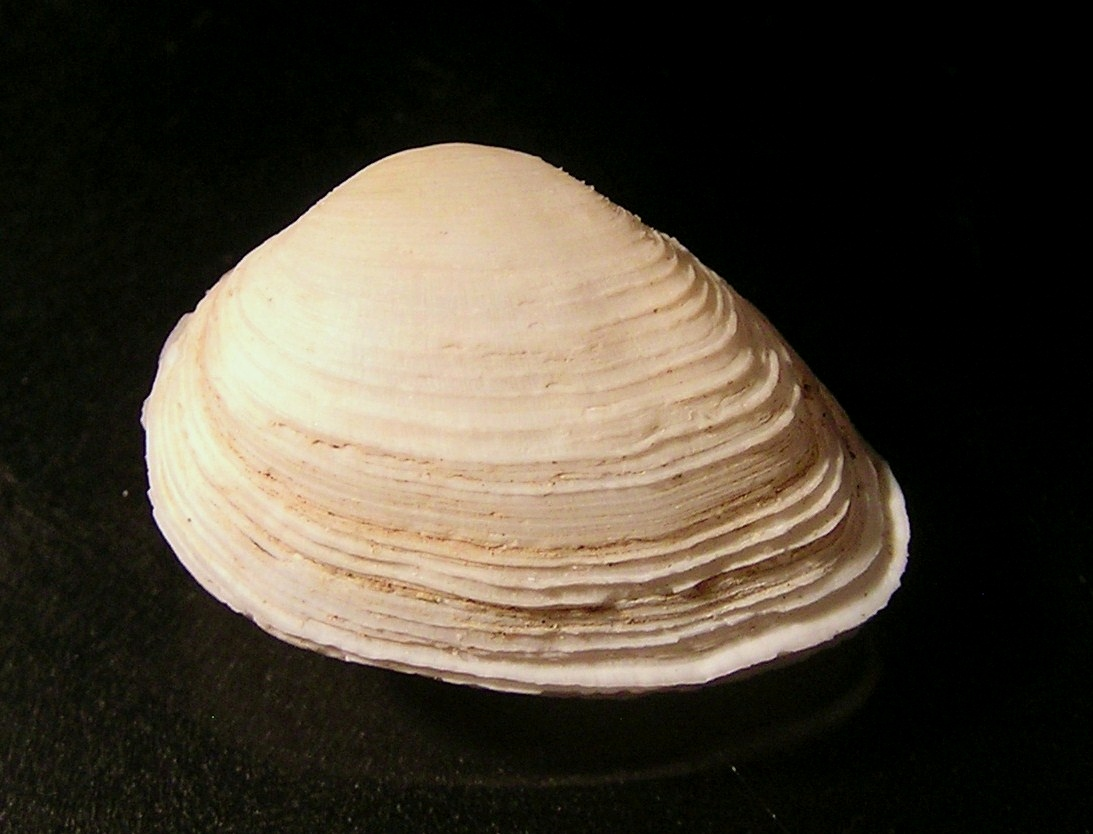
Gastrana matadoa

- Ridged tellin Gastrana matadoa (Cape Point to northern KwaZulu-Natal)
- Littoral tellin Macoma litoralis (Mossel Bay to Mozambique)
- Port Alfred tellin Tellina alfredensis Linnaeus 1758 (Cape Point to KwaZulu-Natal south coast)
- Tellina capsoides (Durban to Mozambique)
- Gilchrist's tellin Tellina gilchristi (Cape Columbine to Eastern Cape)
- Tellina trilatera (Orange river to Transkei)

Teredinidae

- Shipworm Bankia carinata (Mossel Bay to Mozambique)

Donacidae – Wedge shells

- Donax bipartitus (East London to Mozambique)
- Round ended wedge shell Donax burnupi (Cape Point to Mozambique)
- Slippery wedge shell Donax lubricus (Port Alfred to Mozambique)
- Ridged wedge shell Donax madagscariensis (Transkei to Mozambique)
- White mussel or Wedge shell Donax serra (Namibia to Transkei)
- Donax sordidus (Cape Point to Transkei)

Psammobiidae – Sunset clams

- Sunset clam Hiatula lunulata (Transkei to Mozambique)
- Sand tellin Psammotellina capensis (Cape Agulhas to Transkei)

Veneridae – Venus shells

- Heart clam Dosinia lupinus orbignyi (Namibia to Eastern Cape)
- Dosinia hepatica (Mossel Bay to Mozambique)
- Beaked clam Eumarcia paupercula (Mossel Bay to Mozambique)
- Ribbed venus Gafrarium pectinatum alfredense (Port Elizabeth to Mozambique)
- Zigzag clam Pitar abbreviatus (Cape Point to Mozambique)
- Mottled venus Sunetta contempta bruggeni? (Cape Point to northern KwaZulu-Natal)
- Streaked sand clam Tivela compressa (Cape Point to Eastern Cape)
- Tivela polita (Transkei to Mozambique)
- Corrugated venus Venerupis corrugatus (Namibia to central KwaZulu-Natal)
- Warty venus Venus verrucosa (Namibia to Mozambique)

== Polyplacophora ==
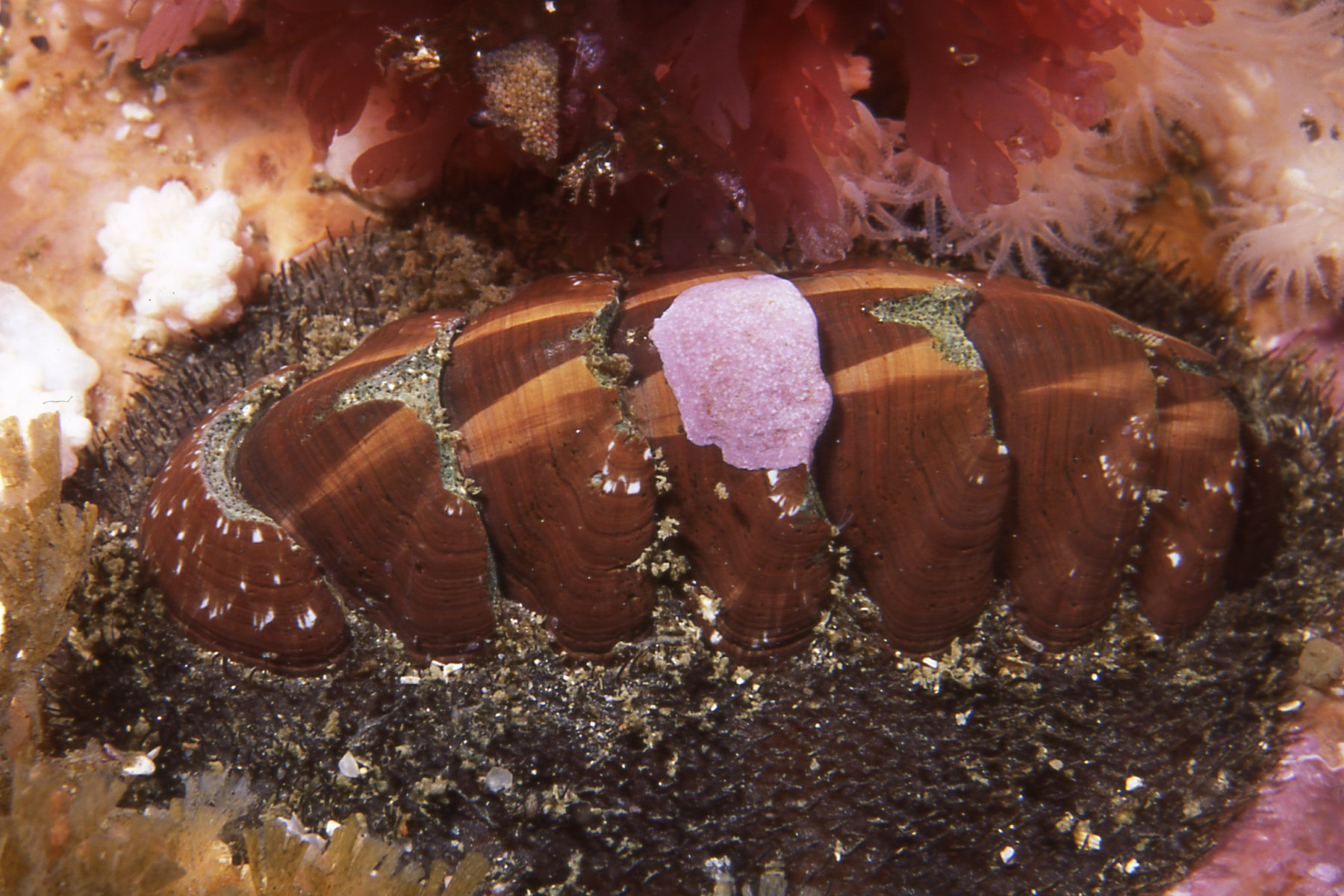
Hairy chiton Chaetopleura (Chaetopleura) papilio

Chitons (Polyplacophora) in South Africa include:

Ischnochitonidae

- Textile chiton Ischnochiton textilis (Gray, 1828) (Namibia to central KwaZulu-Natal)
- Dwarf chiton Ischnochiton oniscus (Krauss, 1848) (Cape Columbine to Mozambique)
- Ribbed scale chiton Ischnochiton bergoti (Velain, 1877) (Namibia to Cape Point)
- Ischnochiton hewitti

Chitonidae

- Tulip chiton Chiton (Rhyssoplax) politus Spengler, 1797 syn Chiton tulipa (Quoy & Gaimard, 1835) (Cape Columbine to KwaZulu-Natal south coast)
- Brooding chiton Chiton nigrovirescens de Blainville, 1825 (Namibia to Cape Agulhas) (accepted as Radsia nigrovirescens)
- Black chiton Onithochiton literatus (Krauss, 1848) (Cape Point to Mozambique)

Callochitonidae

- Broad chiton Callochiton castaneus (Wood, 1815) (Orange river to northern KwaZulu-Natal)

Acanthochitona

- Spiny chiton Acanthochitona garnoti de Blainville, 1825 (Cape Columbine to KwaZulu-Natal south coast)
- Craspedochiton producta Phil

Chaetopleuridae

- Giant chiton or Armadillo Dinoplax gigas Gmelin, 1791 (Cape Point to KwaZulu-Natal south coast)
- Dinoplax validifossus Ashby (Northern Transkei to Kwazulu-Natal)
- Hairy chiton Chaetopleura (Chaetopleura) papilio (Spengler, 1797) (Namibia to Cape Point)
- Orange hairy chiton Chaetopleura (Chaetopleura) pertusa (Reeve, 1847) (Cape Columbine to northern KwaZulu-Natal)

== Cephalopoda ==
Cephalopods in South Africa include:

Octopoda – Octopus

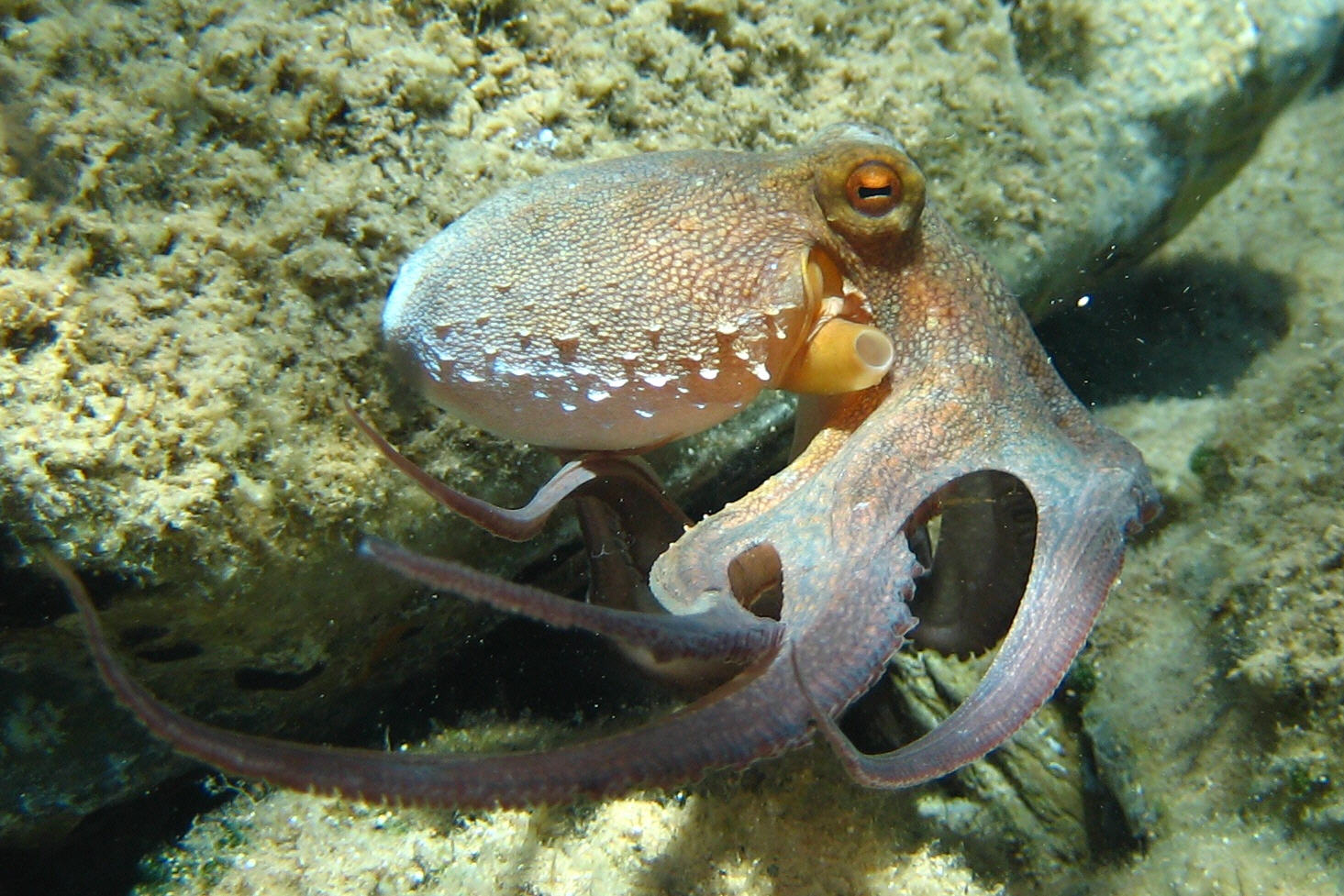
Common octopus Octopus vulgaris

Octopodidae

- Common octopus Octopus vulgaris Cuvier, 1797 (Namibia to northern KwaZulu-Natal)
- Giant octopus Octopus magnificus Villanueva et al., 1992 (syn. Enteroctopus magnificus)
- Brush tipped octopus Aphrodoctopus schultzei Hoyle, 1910 (Cape Columbine to Cape Point) (syn. Eledone thysanophora)

Argonautidae

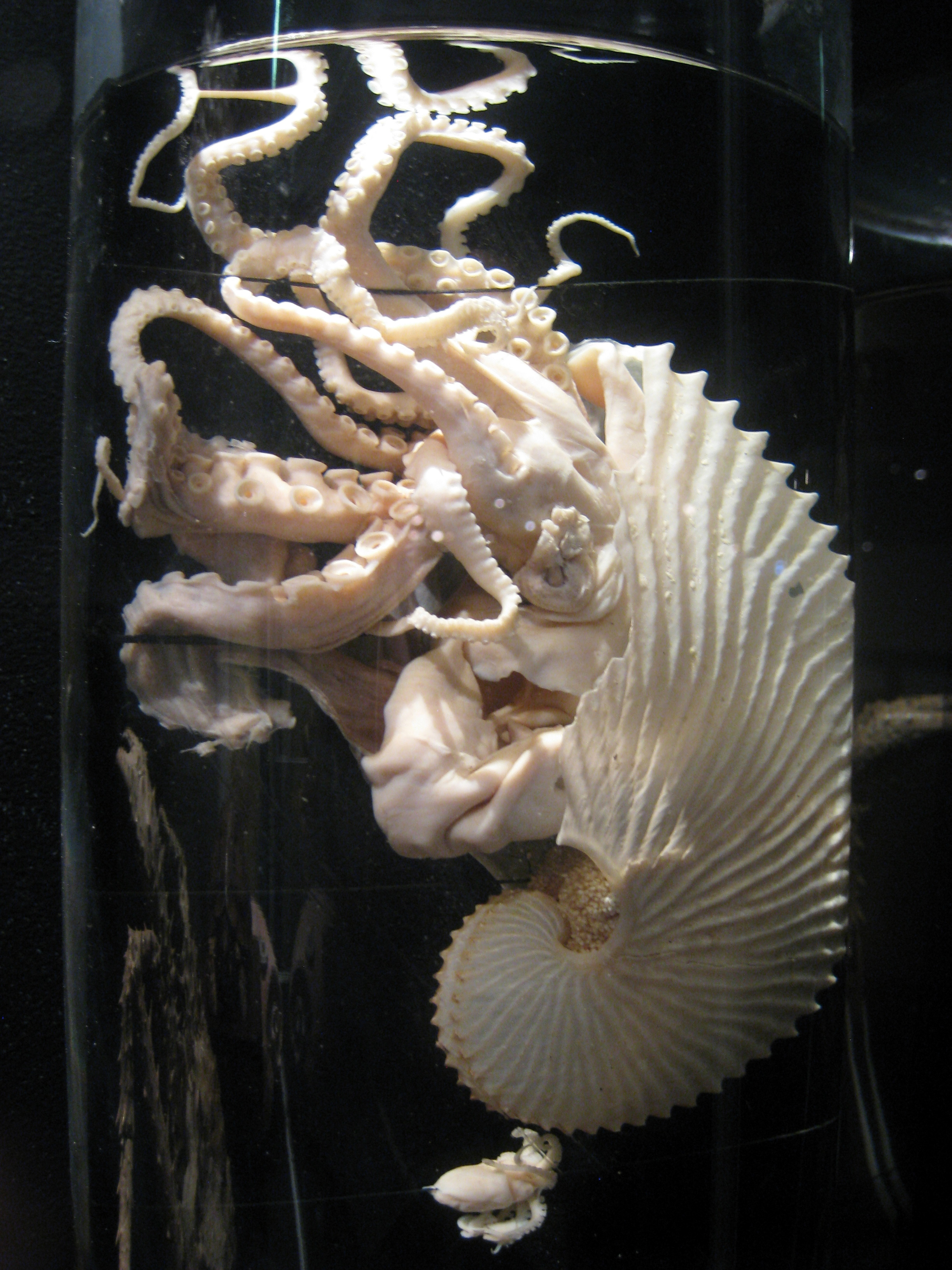
Paper nautilus Argonauta argo

- Paper nautilus Argonauta argo Linnaeus, 1758 (Cape Point to northern KwaZulu-Natal)

Teuthida – Squid

Loliginidae

- Indian Ocean squid Loligo duvauceli Orbigny, 1848 (Port Alfred to Mozambique)
- Chokka or Calimari Loligo vulgaris reynaudi (Orbigny, 1845) (Orange river to Eastern Cape) (syn. Loligo reynaudi Orbigny, 1845)
- Diamond squid Thysanoteuthis rhombus Troschel, 1857

Sepiolida – Bobtail squid

- Unidentified species (Cape Peninsula, both sides)

Sepiida – Cuttlefish

Sepiidae

- Sepia papillata Quoy & Gaimard, 1832
- Beautiful cuttlefish Sepia (Hemisepius) pulchra Roeleveld & Liltved, 1985
- Sepia simoniana Thiele, 1920
- Tuberculate cuttlefish Sepia tuberculata Lamarck, 1798 (Cape Columbine to Eastern Cape)
- Common cuttlefish Sepia vermiculata Quoy and Gaimard, 1832 (Orange river to Mozambique)

Spirulida – Ram's horn squid

Spirulidae

- Ram's horn shell Spirula spirula Linnaeus 1758 (Eastern Cape to Mozambique)

== Scaphopoda ==
Tusk shells (Scaphopoda) in South Africa include:

Dentaliidae

- Dentalium regulare E.A. Smith, 1903 (Jeffreys Bay to Durban)
- Antalis longirostrum (Reeve, 1843) (Indo-Pacific to KwaZulu-Natal south coast)

Gadilidae

- Siphonodentalium booceras (Tomlin, 1926)
- Cadulus spp. Three other species known here, all inhabiting deep water

== See also ==
- List of non-marine molluscs of South Africa

Lists of molluscs of surrounding countries:

- List of marine molluscs of Namibia, (north from Namibia: List of marine molluscs of Angola)
- List of marine molluscs of Mozambique
