= Chaetopleura pertusa =

Scientific classification
- Kingdom: Animalia
- Phylum: Mollusca
- Class: Polyplacophora
- Order: Chitonida
- Family: Chaetopleuridae
- Genus: Chaetopleura
- Subgenus: Chaetopleura
- Species: C. pertusa

Binomial name
- Chaetopleura pertusa (Reeve, 1847)

Synonyms
- Chiton pertusus Reeve, 1847 (basionym)

Species of mollusc

Chaetopleura pertusa, the orange hairy chiton, is a species of chitons in the family Chaetopleuridae. It is a marine mollusc. It is endemic to South Africa.

== Distribution ==
This species is found around the South African coast from Saldanha Bay to Kosi Bay, subtidally to at least 20 m.

== Description ==
The orange hairy chiton is a distinctive chiton with pink or orange mottled valves. The valves have a granular texture and are surrounded by a wide girdle of pink or orange. The girdle has branched bristles and short hairs. The animal may grow up to 50 mm in total length.

== Ecology ==
The orange hairy chiton lives under rocks during the day but emerges at night.
