= Chaetopleura apiculata =

- Scale in mm

Conservation status
- Secure (NatureServe)

Scientific classification
- Kingdom: Animalia
- Phylum: Mollusca
- Class: Polyplacophora
- Order: Chitonida
- Family: Chaetopleuridae
- Genus: Chaetopleura
- Subgenus: Chaetopleura
- Species: C. apiculata

Binomial name
- Chaetopleura apiculata (Say in Conrad, 1834)

Synonyms
- Chiton apiculatus Say in Conrad, 1834

Species of mollusc

Chaetopleura apiculata is a species of small chiton in the family Chaetopleuridae. It is a marine mollusc.

== Distribution ==
- Gulf of Mexico
- North West Atlantic

== Description ==
Teeth of the radula of this species were studied using atom-probe tomography to analyze the chemical structure; the results were published in 2011. It was shown that the teeth contained fibers surrounded by magnetite, and some of them also contained sodium or magnesium. This was probably the first time that atom-probe tomography was used in the study of a radula and in biominerals.
