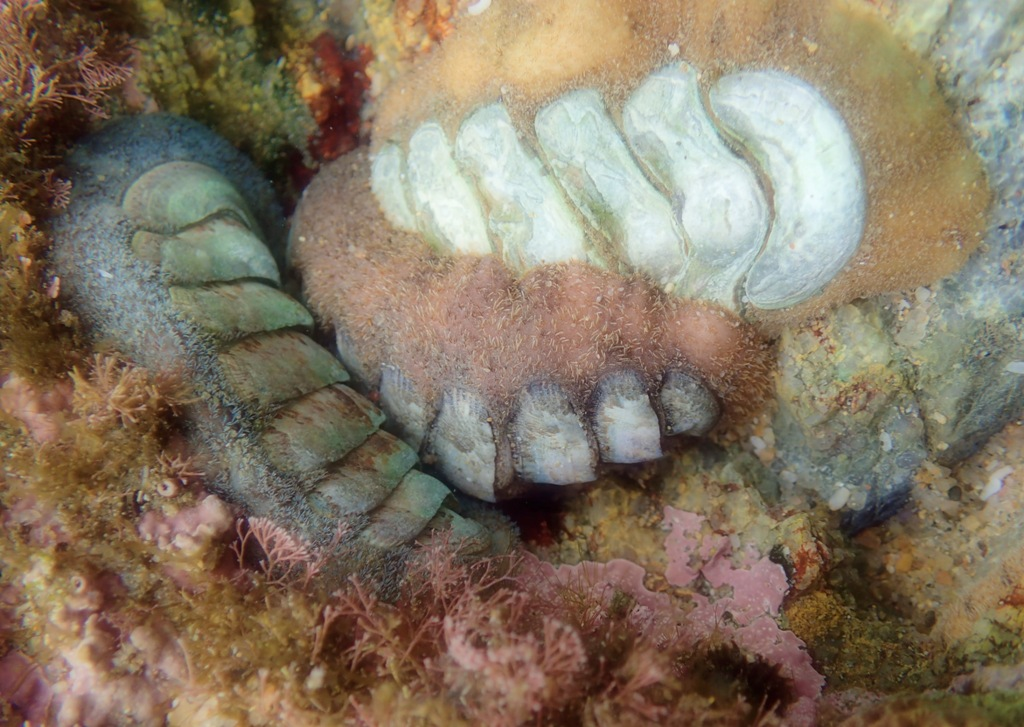

Scientific classification
- Kingdom: Animalia
- Phylum: Mollusca
- Class: Polyplacophora
- Order: Chitonida
- Family: Chaetopleuridae
- Genus: Dinoplax
- Species: D. validifossus

Binomial name
- Dinoplax validifossus Ashby, 1934

Synonyms
- Dinoplax gigas validifossus Ashby, 1934

= Dinoplax validifossus =

Species of mollusc

Dinoplax validifossus, the Natal giant chiton, is a large polyplacophoran mollusc in the family Chaetopleuridae, found on the eastern coast of southern Africa. It was originally considered a subspecies of the giant chiton.

== Description ==
This species is similar to the giant chiton, displaying large arched, grey or brown valves that may be heavily eroded. However, the hairs on its brown girdle are uniformly distributed rather than clumped. Adults may reach a total body length of 50–70 mm.

== Distribution and habitat ==
Dinoplax validifossus occurs along a stretch of the east coast of South Africa from the northern Transkei to KwaZulu-Natal. It is often encountered in small groups and inhabits sandy gullies.
