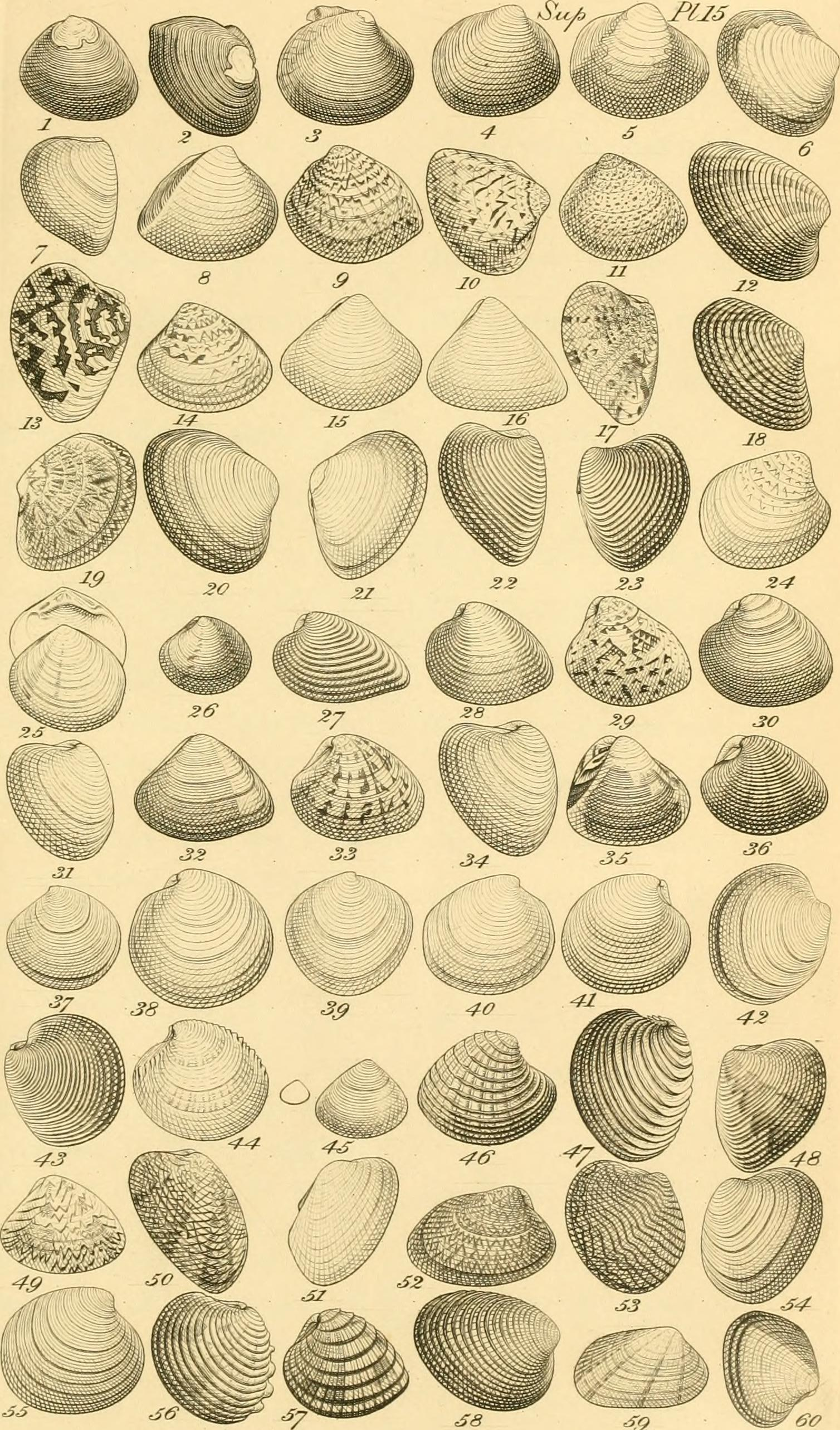
- and illustrated and descriptive catalogue of bivalve shells

Scientific classification
- Kingdom: Animalia
- Phylum: Mollusca
- Class: Bivalvia
- Order: Venerida
- Family: Veneridae
- Subfamily: Callocardiinae
- Genus: Pitar
- Species: P. albidus

Binomial name
- Pitar albidus (Gmelin, 1791)

Synonyms
- Venus albida Gmelin, 1791

= Pitar albidus =

Species of bivalve

Pitar albidus, or the white venus clam, is a species of bivalve mollusc in the family Veneridae. It can be found along the coast of the West Indies.
