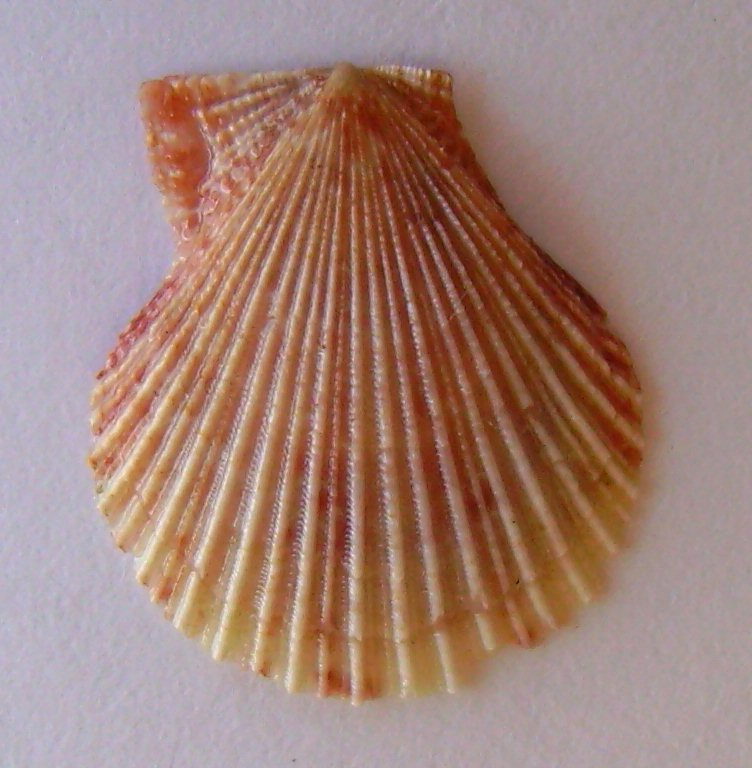

Scientific classification
- Kingdom: Animalia
- Phylum: Mollusca
- Class: Bivalvia
- Order: Pectinida
- Family: Pectinidae
- Genus: Talochlamys
- Species: T. zelandiae

Binomial name
- Talochlamys zelandiae (Gray, 1843)

Synonyms
- Pecten zelandiae Gray, 1843 (basionym); Chlamys celator Finlay, 1928; Chlamys suprasilis Finlay, 1928; Chlamys suprasilis crepusculi C. A. Fleming, 1948; Chlamys zeelandona (Hertlein, 1931); Chlamys zelandiae (Gray, 1843); Pecten dieffenbachi Reeve, 1853; Talochlamys dieffenbachi Reeve, 1853; Pecten imparicostatus Bavay, 1905; Pecten laetus Gould, 1850; Pecten zeelandonus Hertlein, 1931

= Talochlamys zelandiae =

Species of bivalve

Talochlamys zelandiae, common name the fan shell, is a species of marine bivalve mollusc in the scallop family, Pectinidae.

== Distribution ==
This species occurs at littoral depths (0–40 m) off New Zealand, including the Chatham Island.
