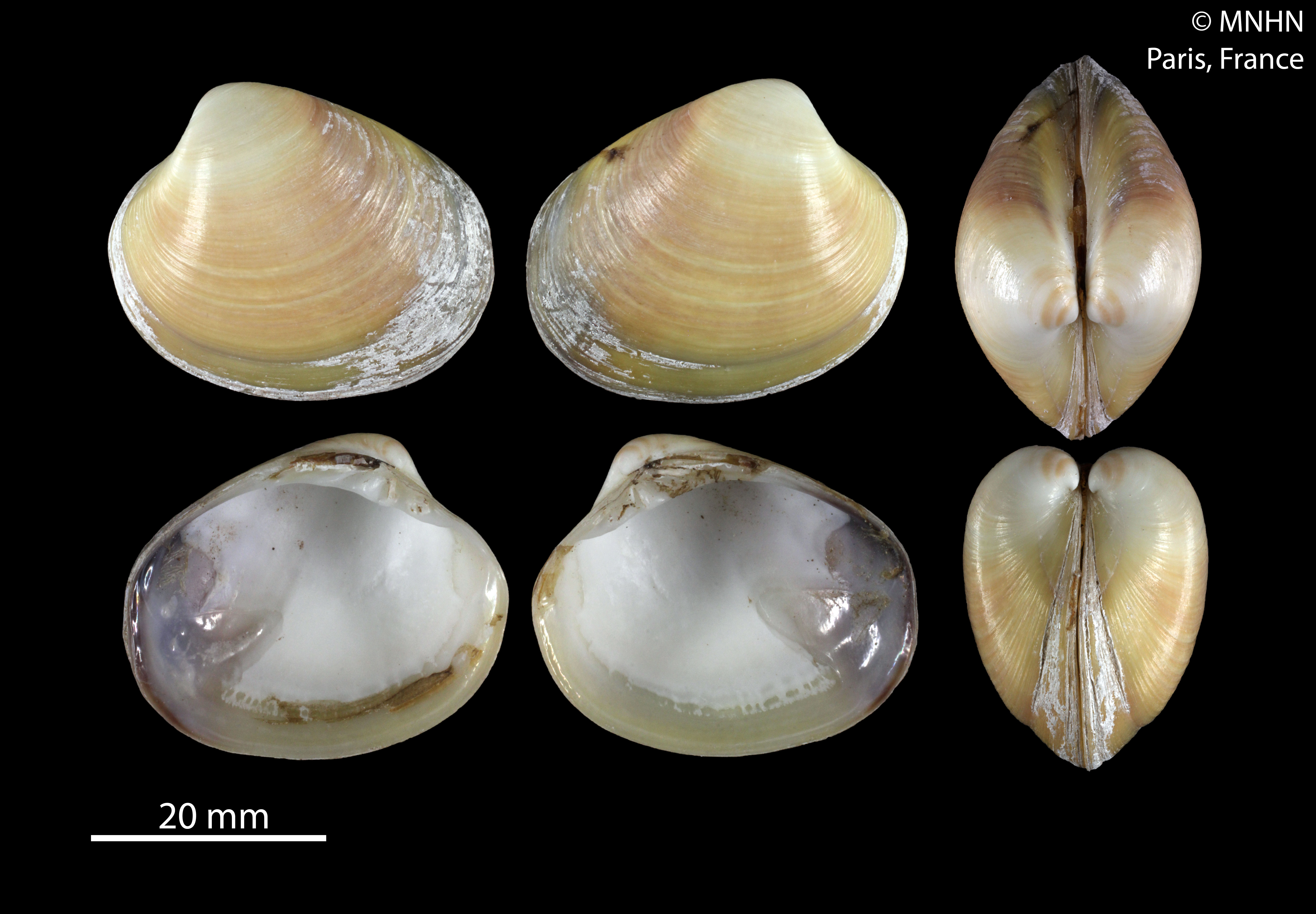
- Pitar laetus

Scientific classification
- Kingdom: Animalia
- Phylum: Mollusca
- Class: Bivalvia
- Order: Venerida
- Superfamily: Veneroidea
- Family: Veneridae
- Subfamily: Callocardiinae
- Genus: Pitar; Römer, 1857

Synonyms
- Caryatis Römer, 1862 (junior homonym of Caryatis Hübner, 1819 [Lepidoptera]); Cytherea (Caryatis) Romer, 1862; Meretrix (Pitar) Römer, 1857; †Pitar (Calpitaria) Jukes-Browne, 1908· accepted, alternate representation; Pitar (Nanopitar) Rehder, 1943· accepted, alternate representation; Pitar (Pitar) Römer, 1857· accepted, alternate representation; Pitar (Pitarina) Jukes-Browne, 1913; Pitar (Prorapitar) M. Huber, 2010· accepted, alternate representation; Pitaria Dall, 1902 (unjustified emendation of Pitar); Pitarina Jukes-Browne, 1913; Venus (Caryatis) Römer, 1862

= Pitar =

Genus of bivalves

Pitar is a genus of saltwater clams, marine bivalve molluscs in the subfamily Callocardiinae of the family Veneridae, the Venus clams. The genus contains over 60 species.

== Species ==
- Pitar aequinoctialis Fischer-Piette, 1969
- Pitar affinis J. F. Gmelin, 1791
- Pitar alabastrum (Reeve, 1863)
- Pitar albidus J. F. Gmelin, 1791
- Pitar albinus (Lamarck, 1818)
- Pitar arestus Dall & Simpson, 1901
- Pitar bermudezi Macsotay & Campos, 2001
- Pitar berryi Keen, 1971
- Pitar brevispinosus Sowerby, 1851
- Pitar bucculentus (Römer, 1867)
- Pitar bullatus Sowerby, 1851
- Pitar chordatum Roemer, 1867
- Pitar citrinus J. B. Lamarck, 1818
- Pitar consanguineus C. B. Adams, 1852
- Pitar coxeni Smith, 1885
- Pitar curnowae Lamprell & Healy, 1997
- Pitar dohrni (Römer, 1867)
- Pitar elatus (G. B. Sowerby III, 1908)
- Pitar erubescens (Dunker, 1853)
- Pitar fluctuatus Sowerby, 1851
- Pitar fulminatus C. T. Menke, 1828
- Pitar hebraeus J. B. Lamarck, 1818
- Pitar helenae A. A. Olsson, 1961
- Pitar inconspicuus (G. B. Sowerby I, 1835)
- Pitar indecorus (Philippi, 1848)
- Pitar inflatus (G. B. Sowerby II, 1851)
- Pitar kathiewayae Lamprell & Kilburn, 1999
- Pitar laetus (Linnaeus, 1758)
- Pitar lineolatus G.B. Sowerby II, 1854
- Pitar mediterraneus N. D. N. Tiberi, 1855
- Pitar multispinosus Sowerby, 1851
- Pitar mundus (Römer, 1860)
- Pitar newcombianus (Gabb, 1865)
- Pitar ngocthieni Thach, 2016
- Pitar nicklesi Cosel & Gofas, 2018
- Pitar obliquatus Hanley, 1844
- Pitar omissa (Pilsbry & H. N. Lowe, 1932)
- Pitar osmunda T. Iredale, 1936
- Pitar pallescens (G. B. Sowerby I, 1835)
- Pitar palmeri Fischer-Piette & Testud, 1967
- Pitar pellucidus J. B. Lamarck, 1818
- Pitar perfragilis H. A. Pilsbry & Lowe, 1932
- Pitar phoenicopterus (Römer, 1867)
- Pitar pilula Rehder, 1943
- Pitar potteri Healy & Lamprell, 1992
- Pitar prora T. A. Conrad, 1837
- Pitar pura (Deshayes, 1853)
- Pitar queenslandicus Lamprell & Healy, 1997
- Pitar rectodorsalis Lamprell & Kilburn, 1999
- Pitar reeveanum J. Hidalgo, 1903
- Pitar rosea Broderip & Sowerby, 1829
- Pitar rostratus Koch, 1844
- Pitar rudis Poli, 1795
- Pitar rufescens (Deshayes, 1853)
- Pitar simpsoni W. H. Dall, 1889
- Pitar soligena (Römer, 1867)
- Pitar sophiae G. F. Angas, 1877
- Pitar striatus Gray, 1838
- Pitar subpellucidus Sowerby, 1851
- Pitar sulfureus H. A. Pilsbry, 1904
- Pitar tahitensis (Philippi, 1851)
- Pitar thornleyae Lamprell & Healy, 1997
- Pitar tortuosus W. J. Broderip, 1835
- Pitar trevori Lamprell & Whitehead, 1990
- Pitar tumens J. F. Gmelin, 1791
- Pitar virgo (Gray, 1838)
- Pitar vinaceus A. A. Olsson, 1961
- Pitar vulneratus W. J. Broderip, 1835

Synonyms

- Pitar abbreviatus C. F. Krauss, 1848 : synonym of Pitar hebraeus (Lamarck, 1818)
- Pitar aletes J. G. Hertlein & A. M. Strong, 1948 : synonym of Hyphantosoma aletes (Hertlein & A. M. Strong, 1948)
- Pitar alternatus W. J. Broderip, 1835 : synonym of Lamelliconcha alternata (Broderip, 1835)
- Pitar callicomatus'' W. H. Dall, 1902 : synonym of Lamelliconcha callicomata (Dall, 1902)
- Pitar circinatus I. von Born, 1778 : synonym of Lamelliconcha circinata (Born, 1778)
- Pitar concinnus G.B. Sowerby I, 1835 : synonym of Lamelliconcha concinna (G. B. Sowerby I, 1835)
- Pitar cordatus Schwengel, 1951 : synonym of Pitarenus cordatus (Schwengel, 1951)
- Pitar dione C. Linnaeus, 1758 : synonym of Hysteroconcha dione (Linnaeus, 1758)
- Pitar elenensis A. A. Olsson, 1961 : synonym of Pitar consanguineus (C. B. Adams, 1852)
- Pitar floridella Gray, 1838 : synonym of Callista floridella (Gray, 1838)
- Pitar frizzelli J. G. Hertlein & A. M. Strong, 1948 : synonym of Callpita frizzelli (Hertlein & A. M. Strong, 1948) (original combination)
- Pitar hertleini A. A. Olsson, 1961 : synonym of Hyphantosoma pollicaris (Carpenter, 1864)
- Pitar hesperius Berry, 1960 : synonym of Lamelliconcha alternata (Broderip, 1835)
- Pitar hoffstetteri Fischer-Piette, 1969 : synonym of Pitar consanguineus (C. B. Adams, 1852)
- Pitar inconstans Ch. Hedley, 1923 : synonym of Costellipitar inconstans (Hedley, 1923)
- Pitar indecoroides Yokoyama, 1928 : synonym of Costellipitar indecoroides (Yokoyama, 1928)
- Pitar japonicum T. Kuroda & T. Kawamoto, 1956 : synonym of Aphrodora kurodai (Matsubara, 2007) (Invalid: junior homonym of Pitar japonica Ando, 1953; Pitar kurodai is a replacement name)
- Pitar levis Zorina, 1978 : synonym of Aphrodora hungerfordi (G. B. Sowerby III, 1888)
- Pitar limatulum G.B. Sowerby II, 1853 : synonym of Hyphantosoma limatulum (G. B. Sowerby II, 1851)
- Pitar lupanaria R. P. Lesson, 1830 : synonym of Hysteroconcha lupanaria (Lesson, 1831)
- Pitar madecassinus Fischer-Piette & Delmas, 1967 : synonym of Costellipitar madecassinus (Fischer-Piette & Delmas, 1967)
- Pitar manillae G.B. Sowerby II, 1851 : synonym of Costellipitar manillae (G. B. Sowerby II, 1851)
- Pitar morrhuanus Linsley, 1848 : synonym of Agriopoma morrhuanum (Dall, 1902)
- Pitar nancyae Lamprell & Whitehead, 1990 : synonym of Hyphantosoma nancyae (Lamprell & Whitehead, 1990)
- Pitar nipponica T. Kuroda & T. Habe, 1971 : synonym of Aphrodora nipponica (Kuroda & Habe, 1971)
- Pitar noguchii T. Habe, 1958 : synonym of Aphrodora noguchii (Habe, 1958)
- Pitar paytensis d'Orbigny, 1845 : synonym of Lamelliconcha paytensis (d'Orbigny, 1845)
- Pitar pollicaris P. P. Carpenter, 1864 : synonym of Hyphantosoma pollicaris (Carpenter, 1864)
- Pitar regularis Smith, 1885 : synonym of Costellipitar regularis (E. A. Smith, 1885)
- Pitar spoori Lamprell & Whitehead, 1990 : synonym of Hyphantosoma spoori (Lamprell & Whitehead, 1990)
- Pitar sulcata Zorina, 1978 : synonym of Aphrodora sulcata (Zorina, 1978)
- Pitar tellinoidea G.B. Sowerby II, 1851 : synonym of Costellipitar cor (Hanley, 1844)
- Pitar unicolor G.B. Sowerby I, 1835 : synonym of Lamelliconcha unicolor (G. B. Sowerby I, 1835)
- Pitar variegatum T. Kuroda & T. Habe, 1971 : synonym of Pitar inflatus (G. B. Sowerby II, 1851)
- Pitar yerburyi Smith, 1891 : synonym of Aphrodora yerburyi (E. A. Smith, 1891)
- Pitar zonatus W. H. Dall, 1902 : synonym of Pitarenus zonatus (Dall, 1902)
