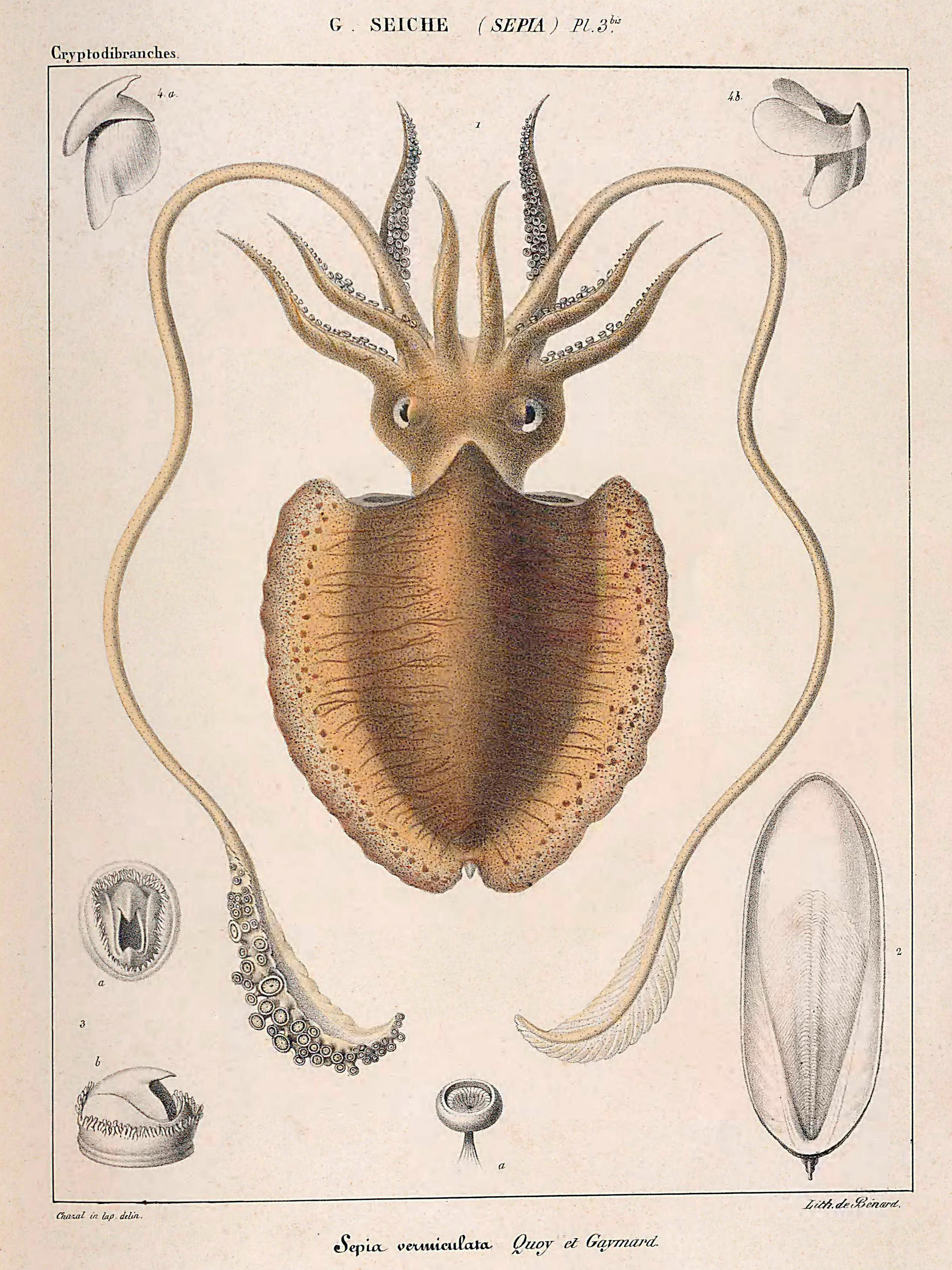

Conservation status
- Data Deficient (IUCN 3.1)

Scientific classification
- Kingdom: Animalia
- Phylum: Mollusca
- Class: Cephalopoda
- Order: Sepiida
- Family: Sepiidae
- Genus: Sepia
- Subgenus: Sepia
- Species: S. vermiculata

Binomial name
- Sepia vermiculata Quoy & Gaimard, 1832

= Sepia vermiculata =

Species of cuttlefish

Sepia vermicularis is a species of cuttlefish endemic to southern Africa. It is known by many common names, such as the patchwork cuttlefish, common cuttlefish or ink-fish, but the name "common cuttlefish" is more widely applied to Sepia officinalis.

== Description ==
The South African common cuttlefish has an elongated body with ten arms bearing rows of suckers. Two arms are elongated tentacles used for catching prey. Paired lateral fins extend the whole length of the body. The upper surface of the body is smooth, with rippling bars of colour and the animal is usually well camouflaged.

== Distribution ==
This cuttlefish is found around the South African coast from Saldanha Bay to Algoa Bay, subtidally to at least 40m. Outside South Africa its range extends to central Mozambique and on the Saya-de-Malha Bank and the Indian Ocean islands of the Seychelles, Mauritius and Rodrigues.

== Ecology ==
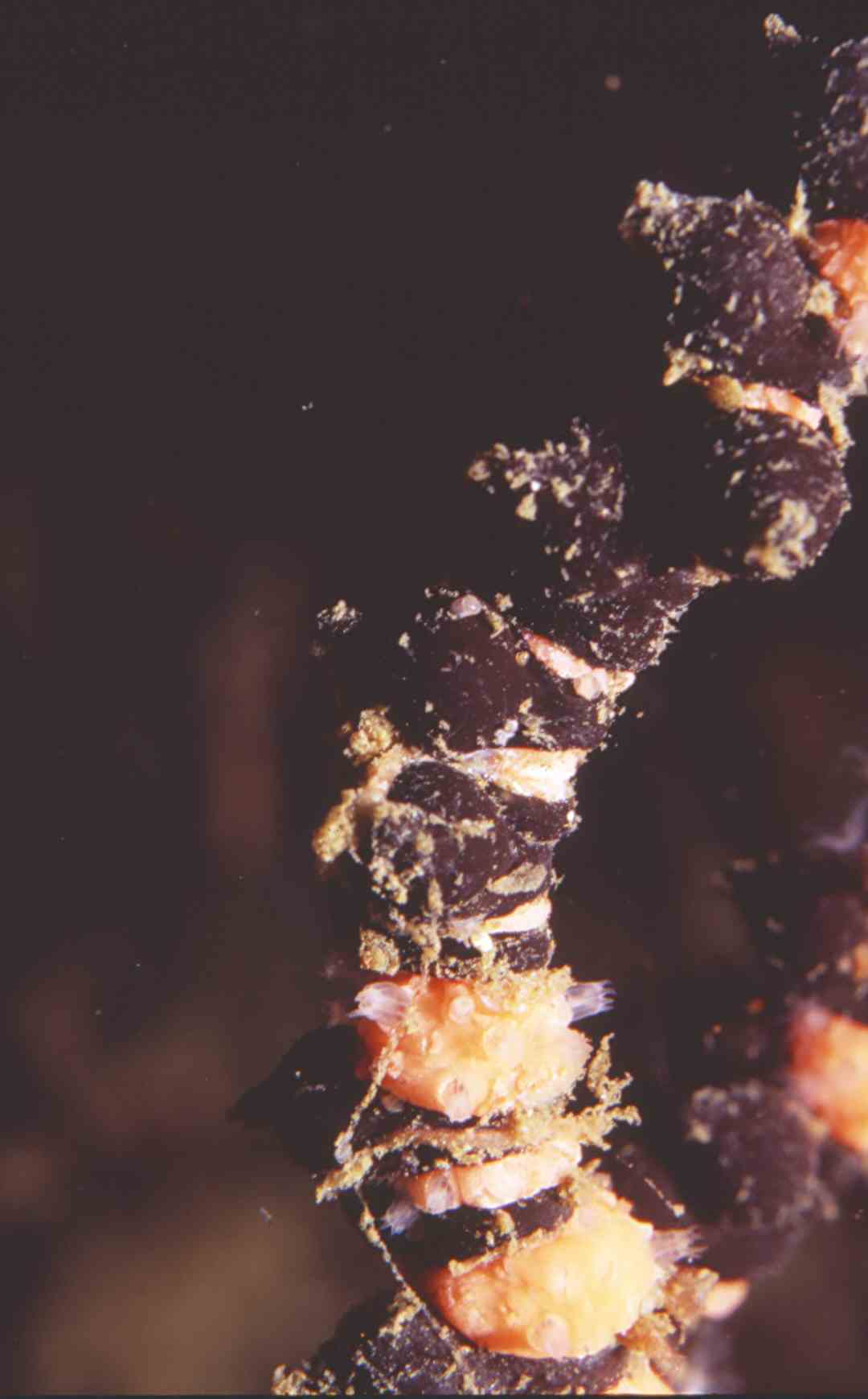
Eggs are laid on sea fan arms

This animal lives on reefs and feeds on shrimp and small fishes. A gas-filled internal shell, the cuttlebone, is used for buoyancy. The eggs are pea-like and black or white and are usually seen attached to sea fans. The animal is capable of rapid changes of colour for camouflage, threat displays or for communicating mating readiness. A male ready to mate will show dark brightly rippling colours as he approaches another cuttlefish. If the other cuttlefish is either a male cuttlefish or a non-receptive female, the other cuttlefish will also show dark brightly rippling colours as a threat display. If the other cuttlefish is a receptive female, her colours will remain pale and head-to-head mating will take place. It may also lift two arms above its head when disturbed, possibly as threat gesture.

It is the only southern African species of cuttlefish to enter lagoons and estuaries having been recorded in Langebaan Lagoon and Knysna Lagoon as well as the mouth of the Kowie River
