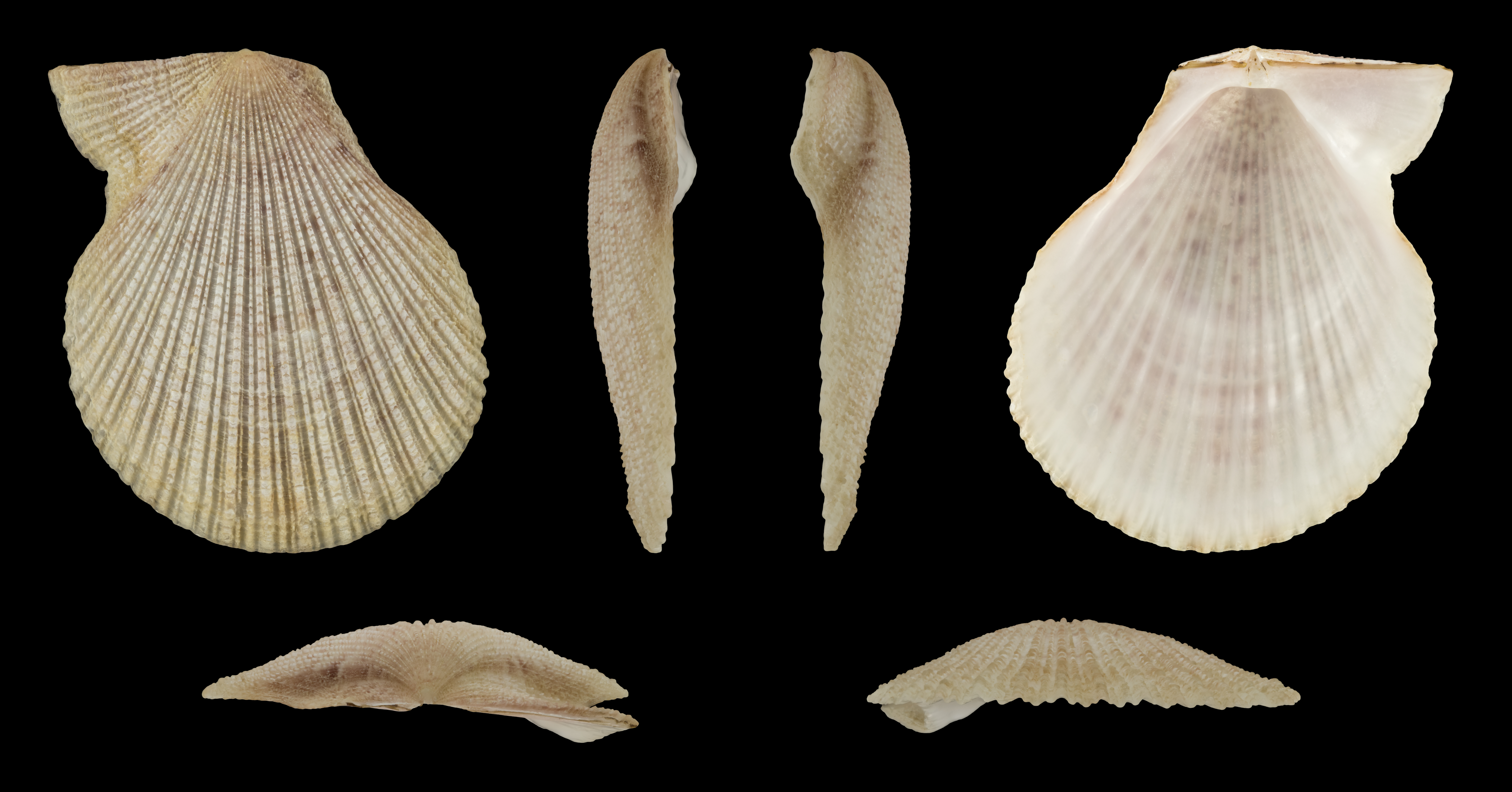

Scientific classification
- Kingdom: Animalia
- Phylum: Mollusca
- Class: Bivalvia
- Order: Pectinida
- Family: Pectinidae
- Genus: Talochlamys
- Species: T. multistriata

Binomial name
- Talochlamys multistriata (Poli, 1795)

Synonyms
- Chlamys tincta (Reeve, 1853)

= Talochlamys multistriata =

Species of bivalve

Talochlamys multistriata, the dwarf fan shell, is a species of bivalve scallop. It is a marine mollusc in the family Pectinidae.

== Distribution ==
This species is found around the southern African coast, from Saldanha Bay to Delagoa Bay, in less than 20 m of water.

== Description ==
This animal grows up to 35 mm in length. It is a small bivalve with a single ear-like protrusion at the hinge. Its shell is finely ridged longitudinally and variably coloured from yellow to purple.

== Ecology ==
The dwarf fan shell lives under stones and among algae. If disturbed, it can swim by clapping its valves together.
