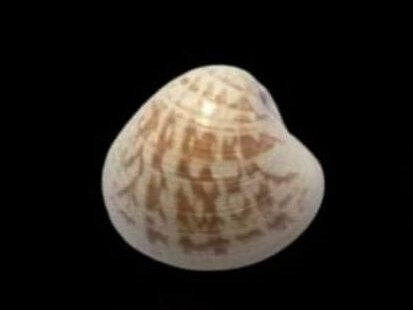

Scientific classification
- Kingdom: Animalia
- Phylum: Mollusca
- Class: Bivalvia
- Order: Venerida
- Family: Veneridae
- Subfamily: Callocardiinae
- Genus: Pitar
- Species: P. fulminatus

Binomial name
- Pitar fulminatus (Menke, 1828)

Synonyms
- Cytherea fulminata Menke, 1828; Cytherea penistoni Heilprin, 1890; Cytherea rubiginosa Philippi, 1845; Cytherea varians Hanley, 1844; Venus holosericea Gmelin, 1791

= Pitar fulminatus =

Species of bivalve

Pitar fulminatus, commonly known as the lightning venus clam, is a species of bivalve mollusc in the family Veneridae. It can be found along the Atlantic coast of North America, ranging from North Carolina to Brazil and Bermuda.
