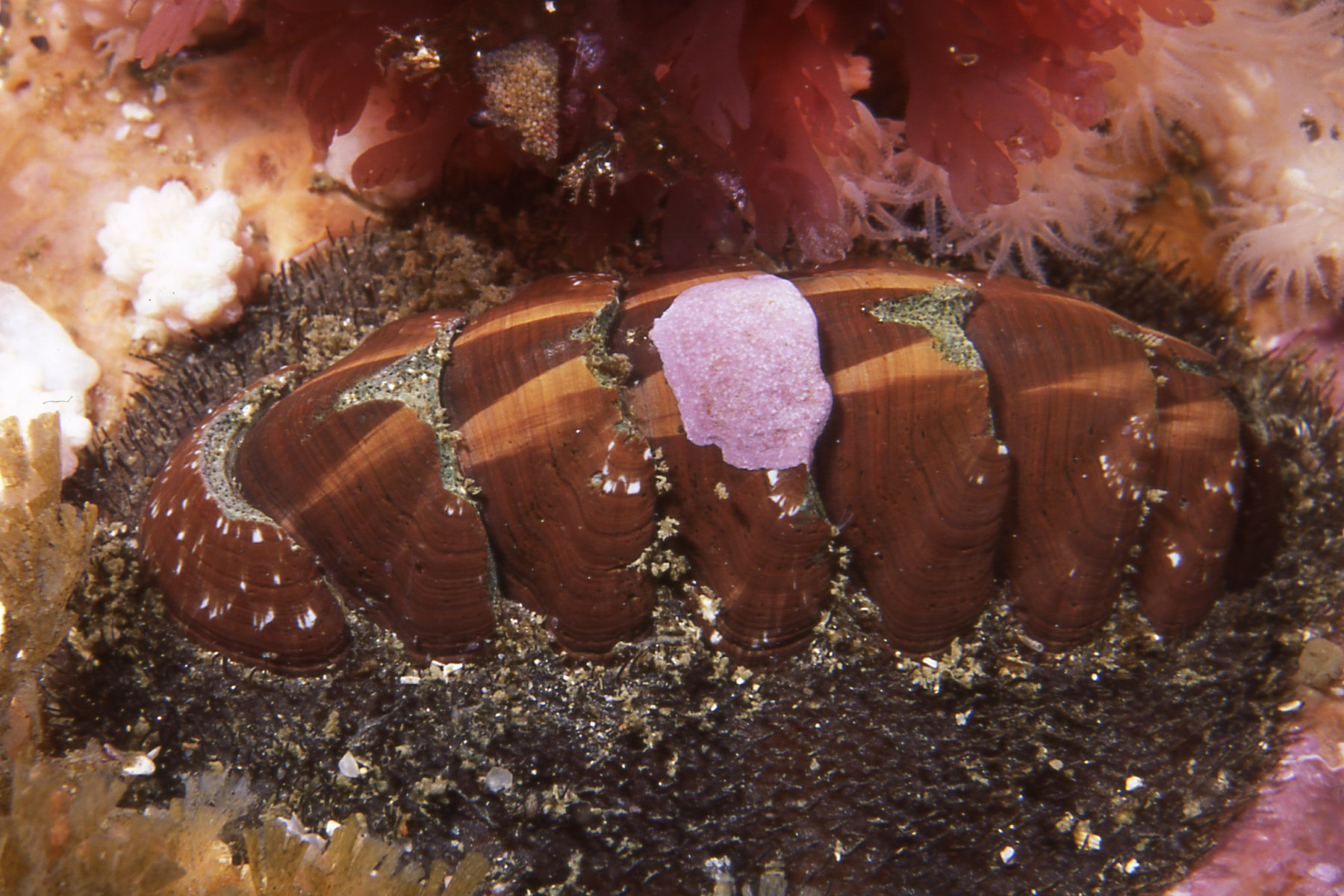

Scientific classification
- Kingdom: Animalia
- Phylum: Mollusca
- Class: Polyplacophora
- Order: Chitonida
- Family: Chaetopleuridae
- Genus: Chaetopleura
- Subgenus: Chaetopleura
- Species: C. papilio

Binomial name
- Chaetopleura papilio (Spengler, 1797)

Synonyms
- Chiton papilio Spengler, 1797 (basionym)

= Chaetopleura papilio =

Species of mollusc

Chaetopleura papilio, the hairy chiton, is a species of chiton in the family Chaetopleuridae. It is a marine mollusc.

== Distribution ==
This species is found from the central Namibian coast to False Bay in South Africa, intertidally to at least 20 m (66 ft).

== Description ==
The hairy chiton has brown and black banded valves. A darker stripe runs down the centre of the valves. It can grow up to 70 mm (2.8 in) in total length. The girdle is covered with black spines.

== Ecology ==
This is a solitary animal.
