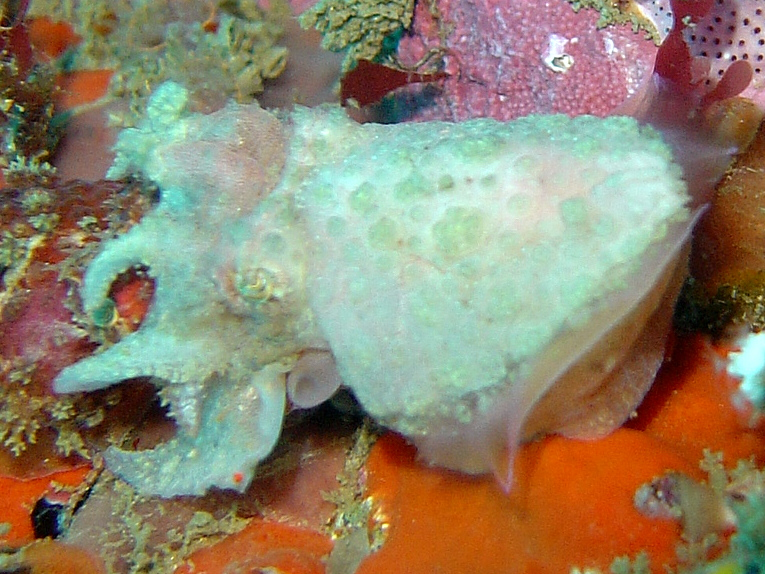

Conservation status
- Data Deficient (IUCN 3.1)

Scientific classification
- Kingdom: Animalia
- Phylum: Mollusca
- Class: Cephalopoda
- Order: Sepiida
- Family: Sepiidae
- Genus: Sepia
- Subgenus: Sepia
- Species: S. tuberculata

Binomial name
- Sepia tuberculata Lamarck, 1798

= Sepia tuberculata =

Species of mollusc

Sepia tuberculata is a species of cuttlefish native to South African waters from Melkbosstrand (an area near Cape Town) (33°43′S 18°26′E) to Knysna (In the South) (34°03′S 23°03′E). It is placed in the genus Sepia, but species resembling it in form are placed in Spathidosepion, whose type genus is S. tuberculata; pending genetic analysis, this species is retained in Sepia. It lives in very shallow water to a depth of 3 m. It is endemic.

The type specimen was collected off the coast of South Africa and is deposited at the Muséum National d'Histoire Naturelle in Paris.

== Description ==
Sepia tuberculata grows to a mantle length of 82 mm. The upper surface of the body is rough with variably extending bumps. The lower body surface has two glandular patches. Like all cuttlefish, this species has ten arms, of which two are elongated tentacles used for catching prey. It has narrow fins which extend the length of the body.

== Ecology ==
Sepia tuberculata is capable of changing colour rapidly. It feeds on shrimps. It uses its glandular patches to cling to rocks.

=== Threats ===
It is the prey of the Cape Clawless Otter – an opportunistic mammal that is adept at capturing available prey. It is often caught in the Tsitsikama Coastal National Park in South Africa. It is part of the IUCN Red List of Threatened Species however it is considered "data deficient" since there is very little published information on the species and thus cannot be put into a Red List Category. A huge threat to Sepia tuberculata, as well as many other Cephalopods, is ocean acidification due to anthropogenic carbon dioxide emissions. Changes in the chemistry of seawater has been found to increase calcification rates in a relative of S. tuberculata, S. officinalis. Increased calcification in the cuttlebone has a negative impact in that it affects the cuttlebone's function as a lightweight, buoyancy structure in cuttlefish.

Cuttlefish have made a lot of the earnings for several fisheries in the English Channel however it is unknown if S. tuberculata is of interest to fisheries in South Africa.

=== Prey ===
Not much is known about specific prey preference S. tuberculata, but the common cuttlefish is known to feed on shrimp. This exhibition of food preference is shown very early in life for cuttlefish and suggests that choosing to prey on shrimp is an innate behavior.

== Adaptations ==
Much of the research published about Sepia tuberculata has been concerning the topic of adhesion. Adhesion is a common occurrence that is used by many plants and animals including Cephalopods, the class to which all Cuttlefish belong. It is effectively bonding, or how plants and animals hold onto substrates. Adhesion, for Cephalopods, typically happens by means of a pressure system that includes use of the suckers on their and tentacles. Sepia are one taxa of cephalopods that produce a chemical substance to be used for adhesion; the use of this secretion varies depending on each specific animal. In addition, S. tuberculata is one of at least four Sepia species that actually possesses an adhesive structure.

No information has been published on whether or not S. tuberculata has the ability to change colors/produce patterns on its body, but the common cuttlefish, S. officinalis, possesses the ability to produce 13 different body patterns composed of a number of different chromatic, textural, postural and locomotor components in its body. The changing of body patterns is primarily used for concealment, and specific patterns are chosen depending on the strategy the cuttlefish intends to use be that disruptive coloration or general color resemblance .
