= Giant chiton =

Giant chiton is a common name for several chitons and may refer to:

- Cryptochiton stelleri, native to the North Pacific Ocean
- Dinoplax gigas, native to coastal South Africa
- Plaxiphora obtecta, endemic to New Zealand
