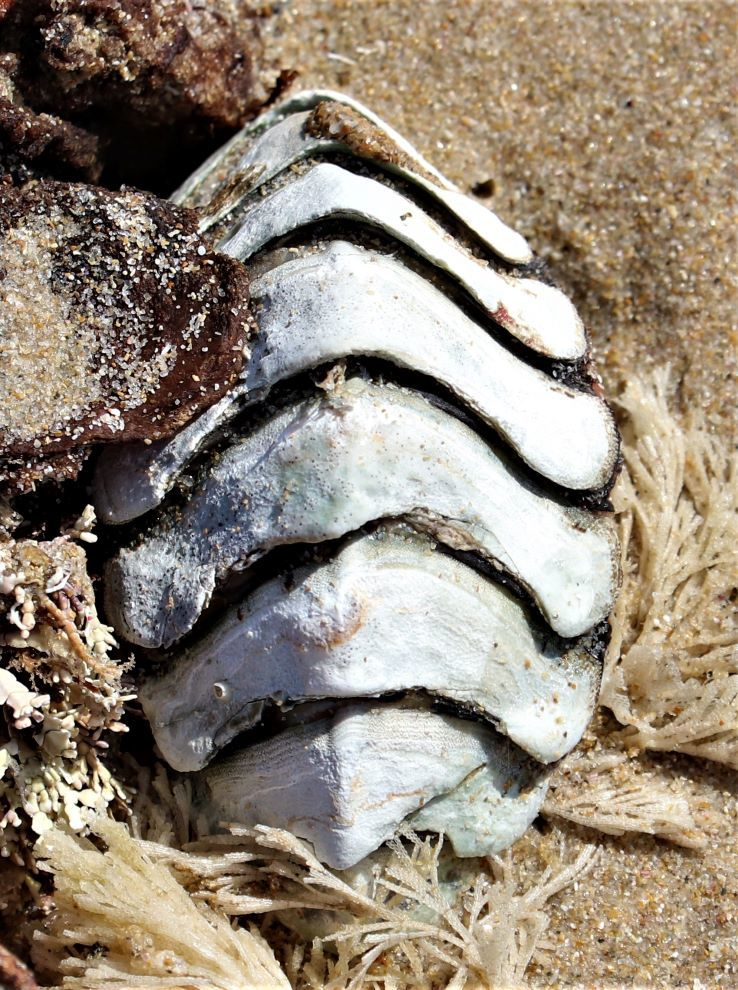
- Giant chiton (Dinoplax gigas)

Scientific classification
- Kingdom: Animalia
- Phylum: Mollusca
- Class: Polyplacophora
- Order: Chitonida
- Family: Chaetopleuridae
- Genus: Dinoplax; Carpenter in Dall, 1882

Species
- See text

= Dinoplax =

Genus of molluscs

Dinoplax is a genus of chitons in the family Chaetopleuridae. They are marine molluscs.

== Taxonomy ==
Species in this genus include:

- Dinoplax chelazziana (Ferreira, 1983)
- Dinoplax fossus Sykes, 1899
- Dinoplax gigas (Gmelin, 1791)
- Dinoplax validifossus Ashby, 1934
