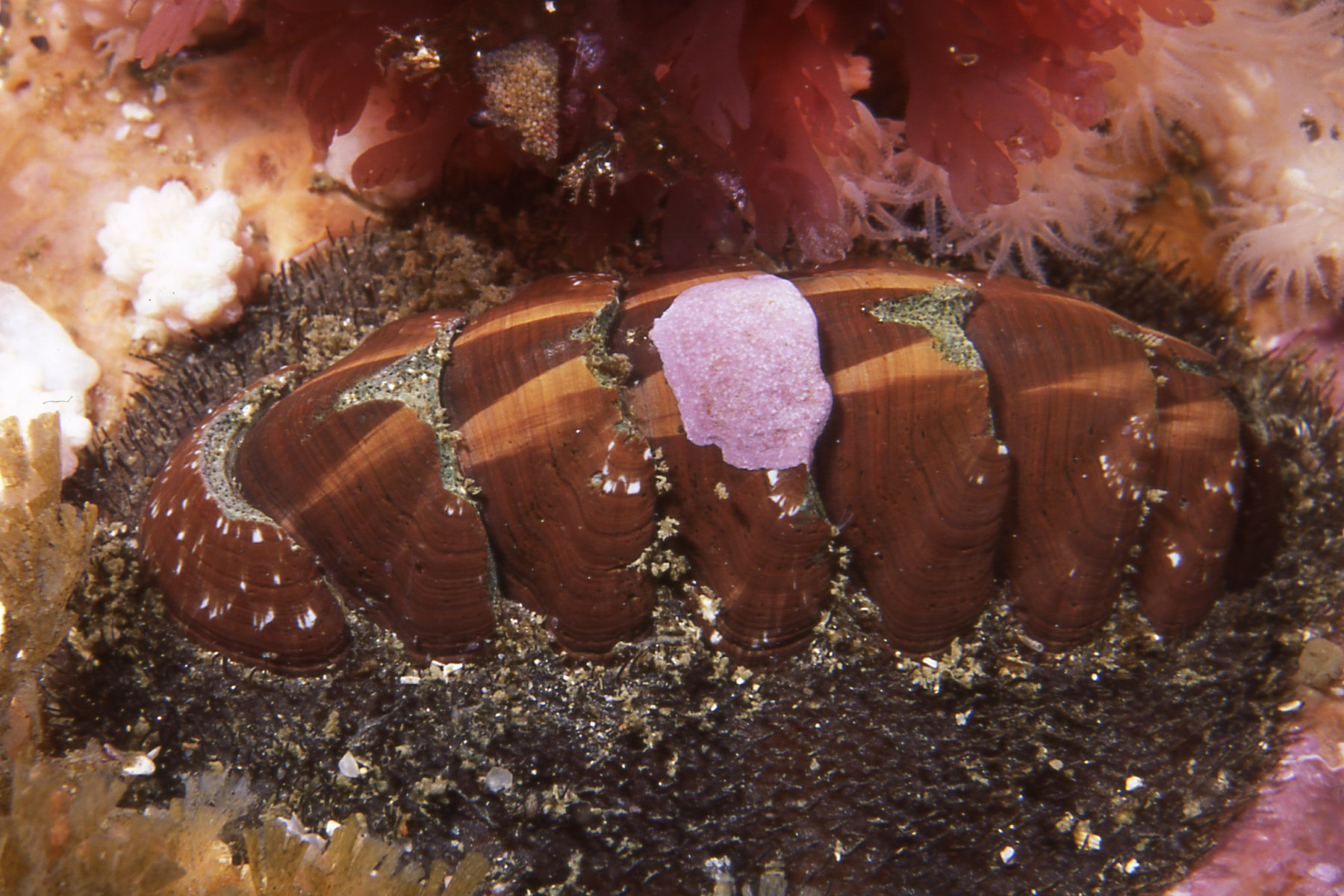
- Chaetopleura papilio

Scientific classification
- Kingdom: Animalia
- Phylum: Mollusca
- Class: Polyplacophora
- Order: Chitonida
- Family: Chaetopleuridae
- Genus: Chaetopleura; Shuttleworth, 1853

= Chaetopleura =

Chaetopleura Temporal range: Oligocene–Recent

Genus of molluscs

Chaetopleura is a genus of chitons in the family Chaetopleuridae. The species within this genus are marine molluscs.

== Taxonomy ==
The genus has been separated into two subgenera.

subgenus Chaetopleura (Shuttleworth, 1853)

- Chaetopleura angolensis Thiele, 1909
- Chaetopleura angulata (Spengler, 1797)
- Chaetopleura apiculata (Say in Conrad, 1834)
- Chaetopleura asperior (Carpenter in Pilsbry, 1892)
- Chaetopleura asperrima (Couthoy MS, Gould, 1852)
- Chaetopleura benaventei Plate, 1899
- Chaetopleura benguelensis Kaas & Van Belle, 1987
- Chaetopleura biarmata de Rochebrune, 1882
- Chaetopleura brucei Iredale in Melvill & Standen, 1912
- Chaetopleura debruini (Strack, 1996)
- Chaetopleura fernandensis Plate, 1899
- Chaetopleura gambiensis (de Rochebrune, 1881)
- Chaetopleura hanselmani (Ferreira, 1982)
- Chaetopleura hennahi (Gray, 1828)
- Chaetopleura isabellei (d'Orbigny, 1841)
- Chaetopleura lurida (Sowerby in Broderip & Sowerby, 1832)
- Chaetopleura papilio (Spengler, 1797)
- Chaetopleura pertusa (Reeve, 1847)
- Chaetopleura peruviana (Lamarck, 1819)
- Chaetopleura pomarium Barnard, 1963
- Chaetopleura pustulata (Krauss, 1848)
- Chaetopleura roddai Ferreira, 1983
- Chaetopleura shyana Ferreira, 1983
- Chaetopleura sowerbyana (Reeve, 1847)
- Chaetopleura staphylophera Lyons, 1985
- Chaetopleura unilineata Leloup, 1954

subgenus Pallochiton (Dall, 1879)

- Chaetopleura gemma Carpenter MS, Dall, 1879
- Chaetopleura lanuginosa
