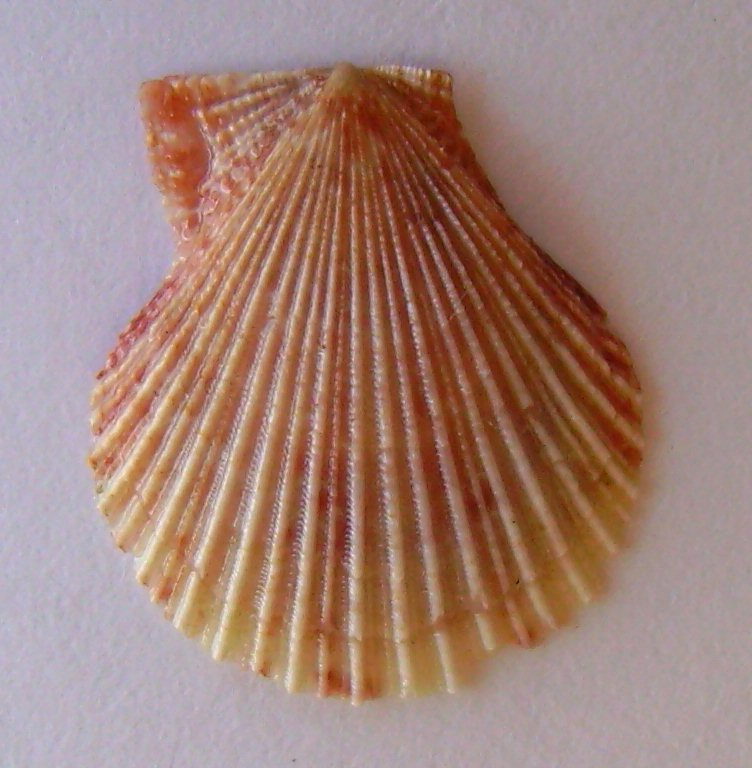
- Talochlamys zelandiae

Scientific classification
- Domain: Eukaryota
- Kingdom: Animalia
- Phylum: Mollusca
- Class: Bivalvia
- Order: Pectinida
- Superfamily: Pectinoidea
- Family: Pectinidae
- Genus: Talochlamys; Iredale, 1929

Type species
- Chlamys famigerator Iredale, 1925

= Talochlamys =

Genus of bivalves

Talochlamys is a genus of bivalves belonging to th subfamily Pedinae of thee family Pectinidae.

The genus has almost cosmopolitan distribution.

== Species ==
- Talochlamys abscondita (P.Fischer, 1898)
- Talochlamys araroaensis (Beu, 1970)
- Talochlamys badioriva Beu & Darragh, 2001
- †Talochlamys chathamensis (Hutton, 1873)
- Talochlamys contorta Dijkstra, 1993
- Talochlamys dichroa (Suter, 1909)
- Talochlamys fischeri (Zittel, 1865)
- Talochlamys gemmulata (Reeve, 1853)
- Talochlamys humilis (G.B.Sowerby Iii, 1904)
- Talochlamys inaequalis Dijkstra & Moolenbeek, 2008
- Talochlamys laticostata Beu & Darragh, 2001
- Talochlamys multicolor (Melvill & Standen, 1907)
- Talochlamys multilamellata Beu & Darragh, 2001
- Talochlamys multistriata (Poli, 1795)
- Talochlamys pulleineana (Tate, 1887)
- Talochlamys pusio (Linnaeus, 1758)
- Talochlamys scandula (Hutton, 1873)
- Talochlamys williamsoni (Zittel, 1865)
- Talochlamys zelandiae (Gray, 1843)

Synonyms

- Talochlamys dieffenbachi Reeve, 1853: synonym of Talochlamys zelandiae (Gray, 1843)
- Talochlamys gladysiae (Melvill, 1888): synonym of Laevichlamys gladysiae (Melvill, 1888)
