= Pitar hebraeus =

Scientific classification
- Domain: Eukaryota
- Kingdom: Animalia
- Phylum: Mollusca
- Class: Bivalvia
- Order: Venerida
- Family: Veneridae
- Subfamily: Callocardiinae
- Genus: Pitar
- Species: P. hebraeus

Binomial name
- Pitar hebraeus (Lamarck, 1818)

Synonyms
- Chione kraussi Deshayes, 1853; Cytherea hebraea Lamarck, 1818; Cytherea lactea Lamarck, 1818; Meretrix hebraea (Lamarck, 1818); Pitar (Pitarina) abbreviatus (Krauss, 1848); Pitar (Pitarina) hebraeus (Lamarck, 1818)· accepted, alternate representation; Pitar abbreviatus (F. Krauss, 1848); Pitar hebraea (Lamarck, 1818) (wrong gender agreement of specific epithet); Pitaria hebraea (Lamarck, 1818); Venus abbreviata Krauss, 1848; Venus paupercula var. abbreviata F. Krauss, 1848

Species of bivalve

Pitar hebraeus is a species of bivalves belonging to the family Veneridae.

The species is found in Africa, Malesia and Northern America.

== Bibliography ==
- Dautzenberg, Ph. (1923). Liste préliminaire des mollusques marins de Madagascar et description de deux espèces nouvelles. J. conchyliol. 68: 21-744
- Dautzenberg P. (1929). Contribution à l'étude de la faune de Madagascar: Mollusca marina testacea. Faune des colonies françaises, 3(4): 321-636, pls 4-7. Société d'Editions géographiques, maritimes et coloniales, Paris.
- Huber, M. (2010). Compendium of bivalves. A full-color guide to 3,300 of the world's marine bivalves. A status on Bivalvia after 250 years of research. Hackenheim: ConchBooks. 901 pp., 1 CD-ROM
