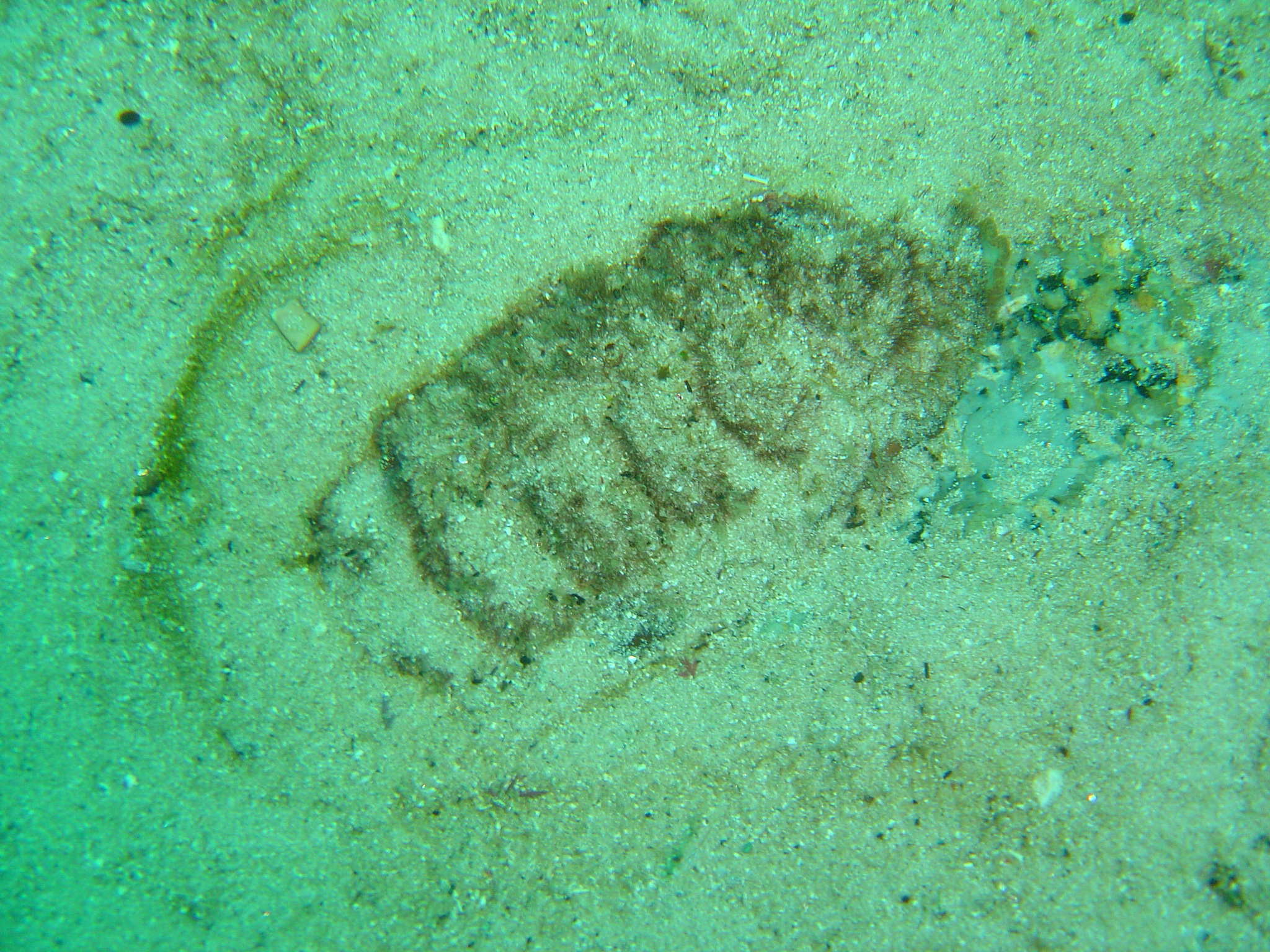
- Giant chiton Dinoplax gigas at Windmill Beach, Simon's Town, in False Bay

Scientific classification
- Kingdom: Animalia
- Phylum: Mollusca
- Class: Polyplacophora
- Order: Chitonida
- Family: Chaetopleuridae
- Genus: Dinoplax
- Species: D. gigas

Binomial name
- Dinoplax gigas (Gmelin, 1791)

= Dinoplax gigas =

Species of mollusc

Dinoplax gigas, the giant chiton, is a species of chiton in the family Chaetopleuridae. It is a marine mollusc.

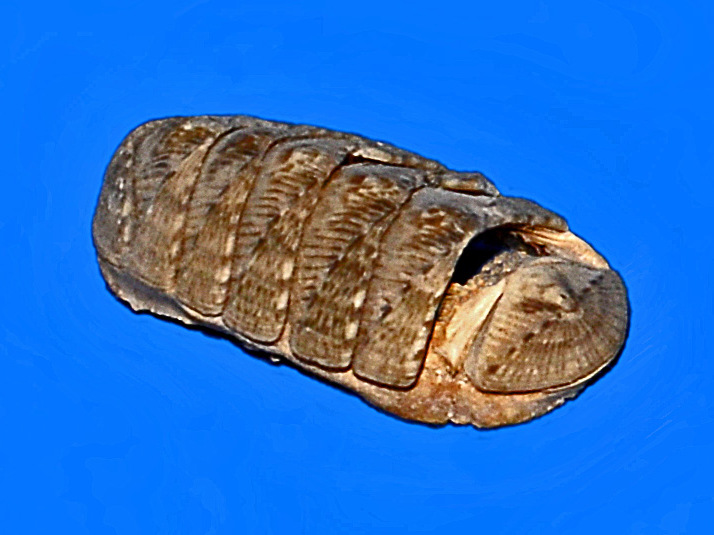
Dorsal view of Dinoplax gigas. Museum specimen

== Description ==
Dinoplax gigas normally reach a length of about 110 millimetres (4.3 in), but exceptionally may grow up to 170 millimetres (6.7 in). These large chitons are elongate, oval, carinate and moderately elevated. They have strongly arched grey or brown valves. The leathery girdle is greyish or brown, spotted with black and has tufts of short hairs.

== Ecology ==
This species hides under rocks during the day but emerges at night.

== Distribution ==
This species is found around the South African coast from the Cape Peninsula to Durban, subtidally to at least 5 m.
