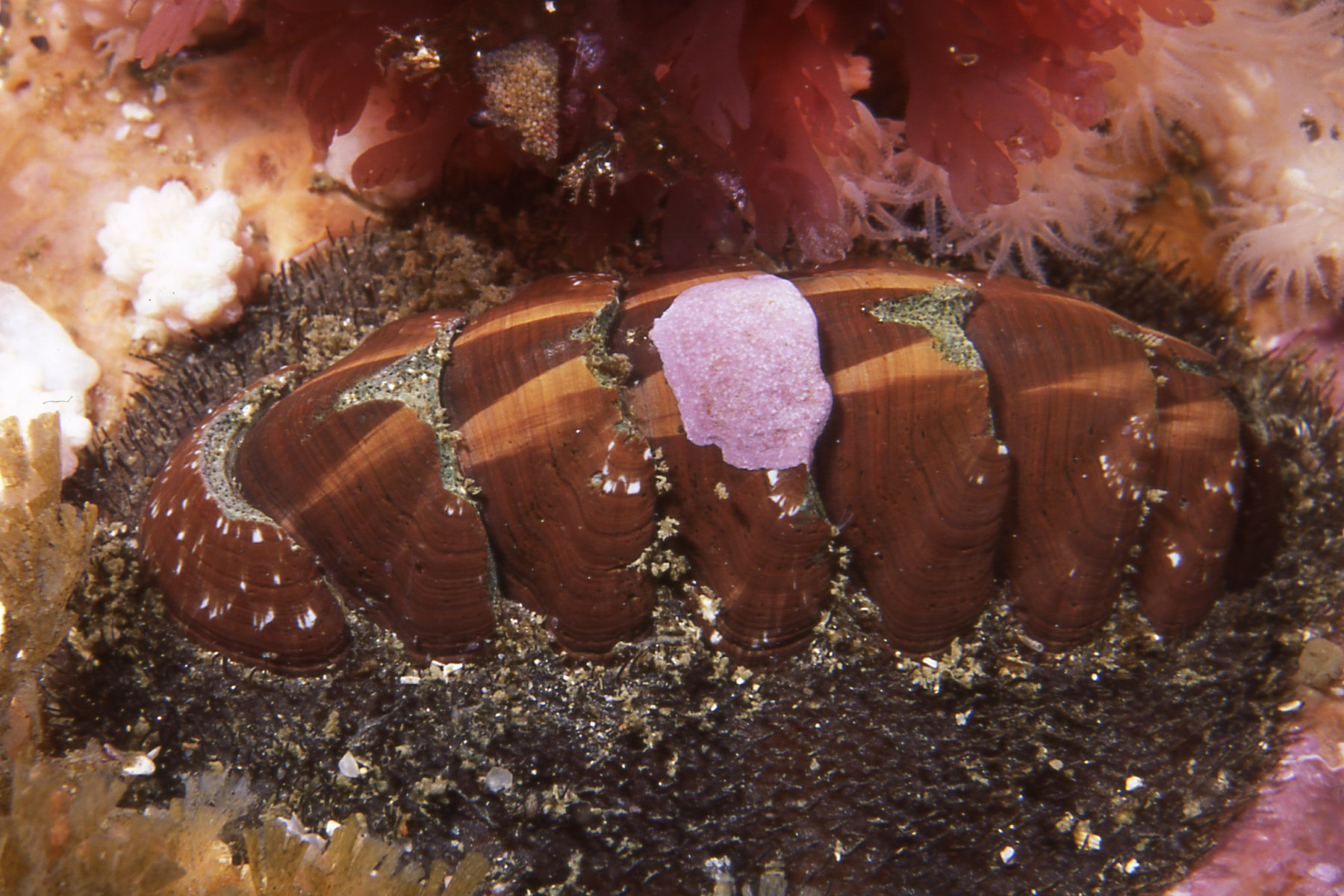
- Chaetopleura papilio

Scientific classification
- Kingdom: Animalia
- Phylum: Mollusca
- Class: Polyplacophora
- Order: Chitonida
- Superfamily: Chitonoidea
- Family: Chaetopleuridae; Plate, 1899

Genera
- See text

= Chaetopleuridae =

Family of molluscs

Chaetopleuridae is a family of chitons. They are marine molluscs.

== Genera ==
Two genera are known in this family:

- Chaetopleura Shuttleworth, 1853
- Dinoplax Carpenter MS, Dall, 1882
