= Marine invertebrates =

Marine animals without a vertebral column

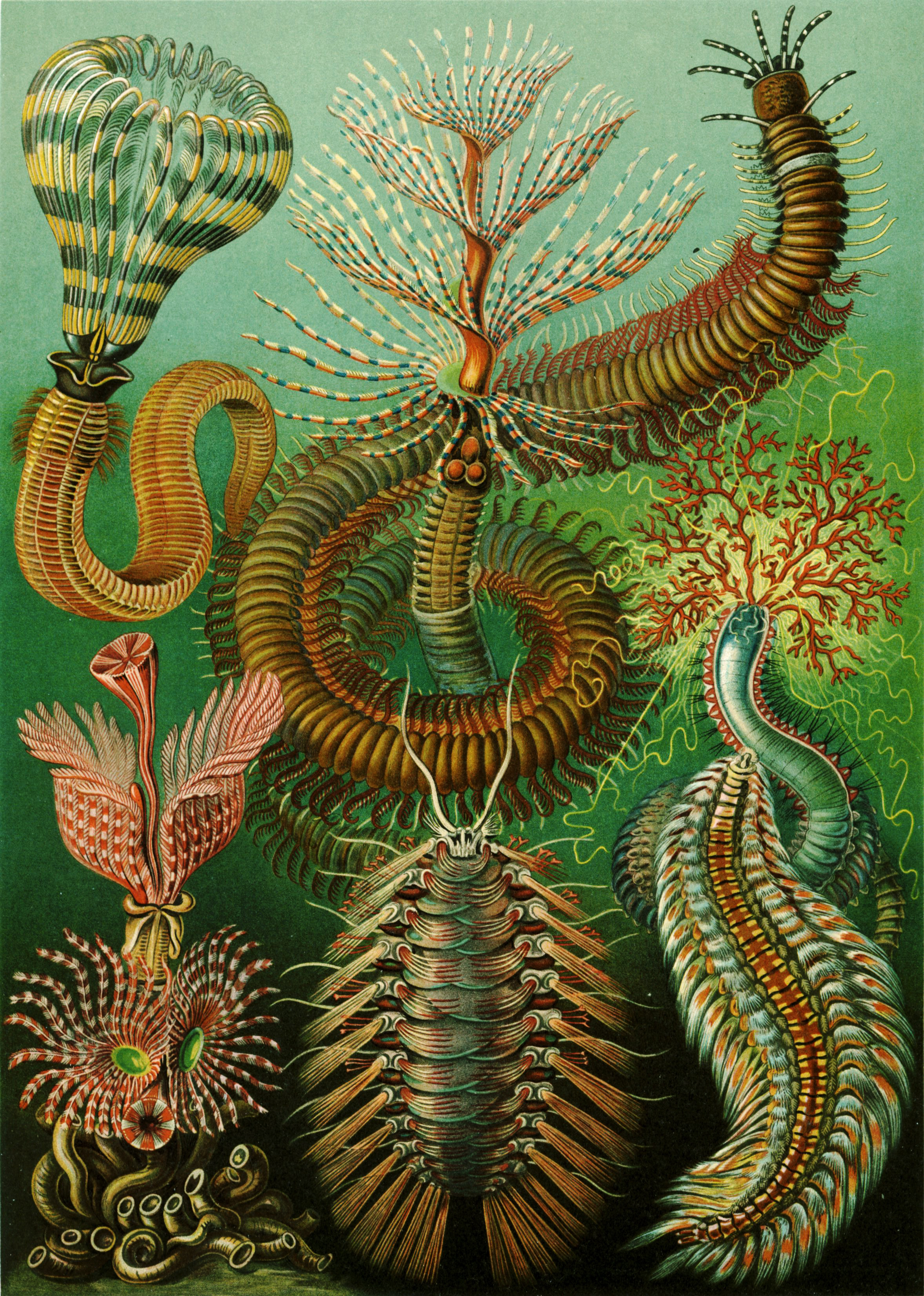
Ernst Haeckel's 96th plate, showing some marine invertebrates. Marine invertebrates have a large variety of body plans, which are currently categorised into over 30 phyla.

Marine invertebrates are invertebrate animals that live in marine habitats, and make up most of the macroscopic life in the oceans. It is a polyphyletic blanket term that contains all marine animals except the marine vertebrates, including the non-vertebrate members of the phylum Chordata such as lancelets, sea squirts and salps. As the name suggests, marine invertebrates lack any mineralized axial endoskeleton, i.e. the vertebral column, and some have evolved a rigid shell, test or exoskeleton for protection and/or locomotion, while others rely on internal fluid pressure to support their bodies. Marine invertebrates have a large variety of body plans, and have been categorized into over 30 phyla.

== Evolution ==
The earliest animals were marine invertebrates, that is, vertebrates came later. Animals are multicellular eukaryotes, (Note: Myxozoa were thought to be an exception, but are now thought to be heavily modified members of the Cnidaria. Jímenez-Guri, Eva; Philippe, Hervé; Okamura, Beth; Holland, Peter W. H. (6 July 2007). "Buddenbrockia Is a Cnidarian Worm". Science. 317 (5834): 116–118. Bibcode:2007Sci...317..116J. doi:10.1126/science.1142024. ISSN 0036-8075. PMID 17615357. S2CID 5170702.) and are distinguished from plants, algae, and fungi by lacking cell walls. Marine invertebrates are animals that inhabit a marine environment apart from the vertebrate members of the chordate phylum; invertebrates lack a vertebral column. Some have evolved a shell or a hard exoskeleton.

The genus Dickinsonia is one of the earliest widely accepted animal fossils and they lived about 571 million to 539 million years ago. Individual Dickinsonia typically resemble a bilaterally symmetrical ribbed oval. They kept growing until they were covered with sediment or otherwise killed, and spent most of their lives with their bodies firmly anchored to the sediment. Their taxonomic affinities are presently unknown, but their mode of growth is consistent with a bilaterian affinity.

Apart from Dickinsonia, the earliest widely accepted animal fossils are the rather modern-looking cnidarians (the group that includes jellyfish, sea anemones and Hydra), possibly from around 580 Ma The Ediacara biota, which flourished for the last 40 million years before the start of the Cambrian, were the first animals more than a very few centimetres long. Like Dickinsonia, many were flat with a "quilted" appearance, and seemed so strange that there was a proposal to classify them as a separate kingdom, Vendobionta. Others, however, have been interpreted as early molluscs (Kimberella), echinoderms (Arkarua), and arthropods (Spriggina, Parvancorina). There is still debate about the classification of these specimens, mainly because the diagnostic features which allow taxonomists to classify more recent organisms, such as similarities to living organisms, are generally absent in the Ediacarans. However, there seems little doubt that Kimberella was at least a triploblastic bilaterian animal, in other words, an animal significantly more complex than the cnidarians.

The small shelly fauna are a very mixed collection of fossils found between the Late Ediacaran and Middle Cambrian periods. The earliest, Cloudina, shows signs of successful defense against predation and may indicate the start of an evolutionary arms race. Some tiny Early Cambrian shells almost certainly belonged to molluscs, while the owners of some "armor plates," Halkieria and Microdictyon, were eventually identified when more complete specimens were found in Cambrian lagerstätten that preserved soft-bodied animals.

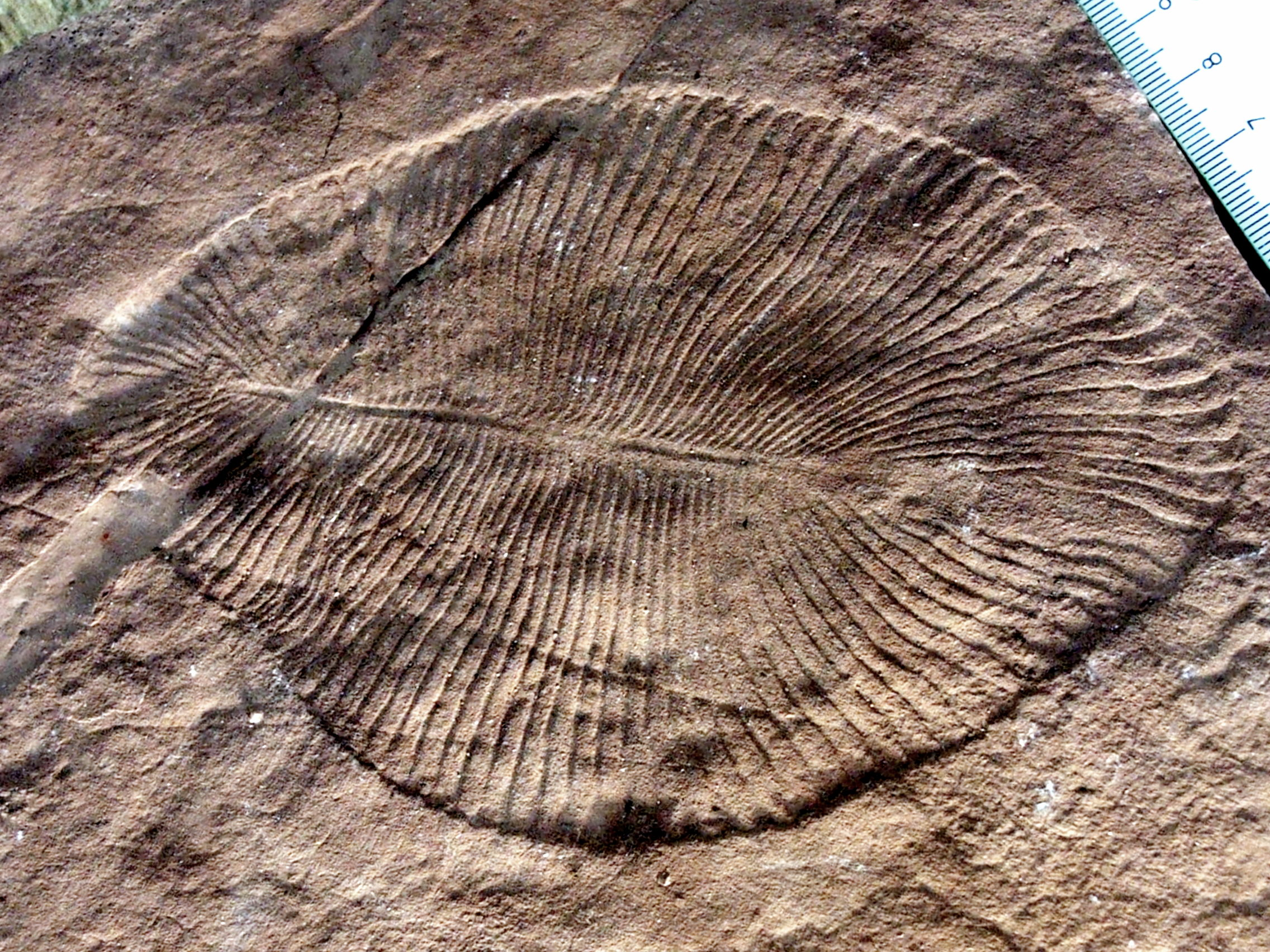
Dickinsonia is one of the earliest widely accepted and undisputed animal fossils. They appear in the fossil record 571 million to 539 million years ago.

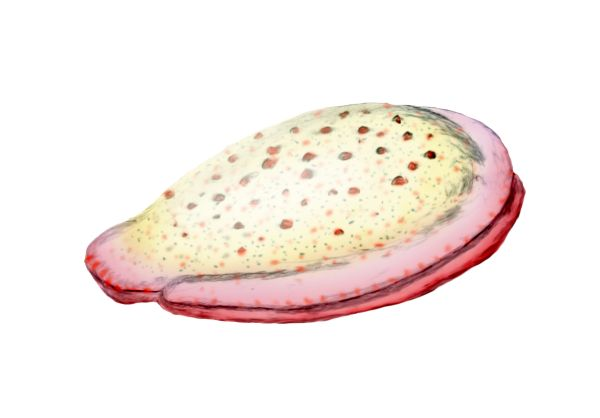
Kimberella, an early mollusc important for understanding the Cambrian explosion. Invertebrates are grouped into different phyla (body plans).

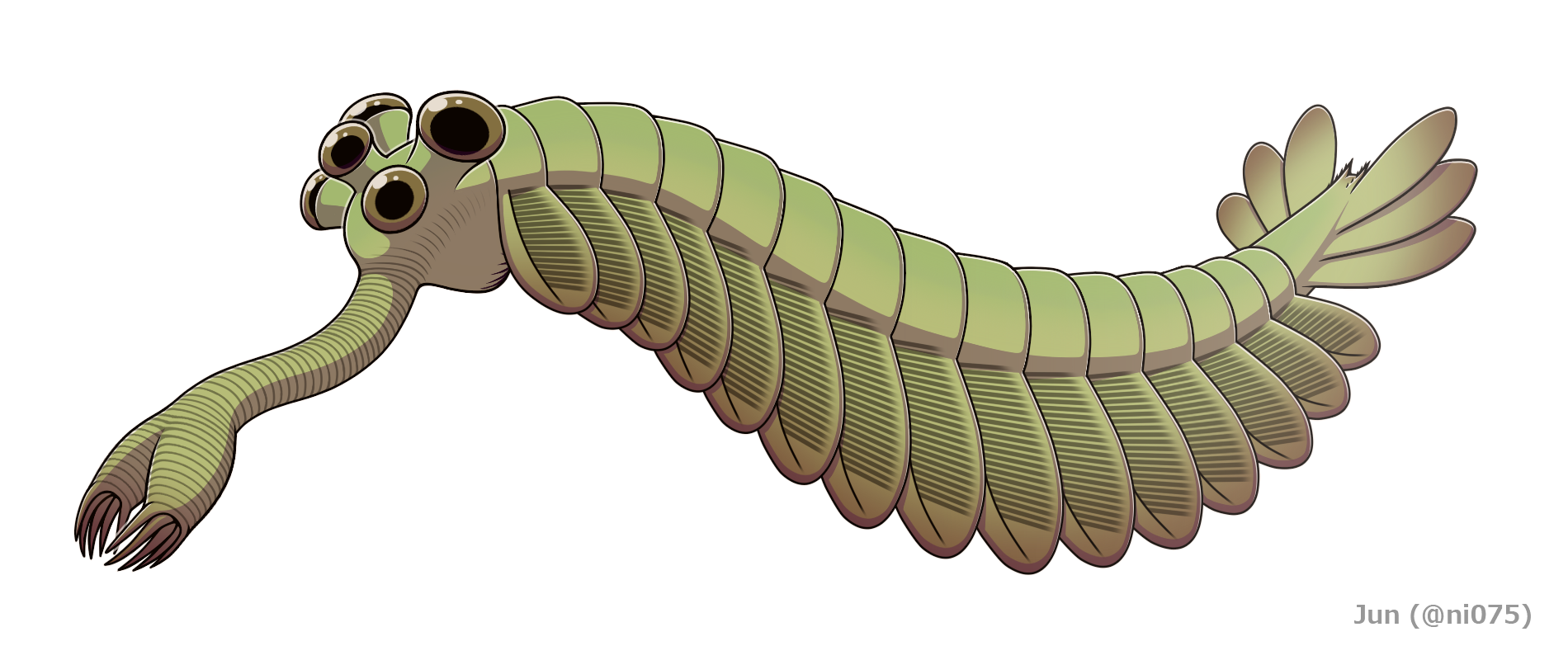
Opabinia, an extinct stem group arthropod appeared in the Middle Cambrian

In the 1970s, there was already a debate about whether the emergence of the modern phyla was "explosive" or gradual but hidden by the shortage of Precambrian animal fossils. A re-analysis of fossils from the Burgess Shale lagerstätte increased interest in the issue when it revealed animals, such as Opabinia, which did not fit into any known phylum. At the time these were interpreted as evidence that the modern phyla had evolved very rapidly in the Cambrian explosion and that the Burgess Shale's "weird wonders" showed that the Early Cambrian was a uniquely experimental period of animal evolution. Later discoveries of similar animals and the development of new theoretical approaches led to the conclusion that many of the "weird wonders" were evolutionary "aunts" or "cousins" of modern groups—for example that Opabinia was a member of the lobopods, a group which includes the ancestors of the arthropods, and that it may have been closely related to the modern tardigrades. Nevertheless, there is still much debate about whether the Cambrian explosion was really explosive and, if so, how and why it happened and why it appears unique in the history of animals.

== Classification ==
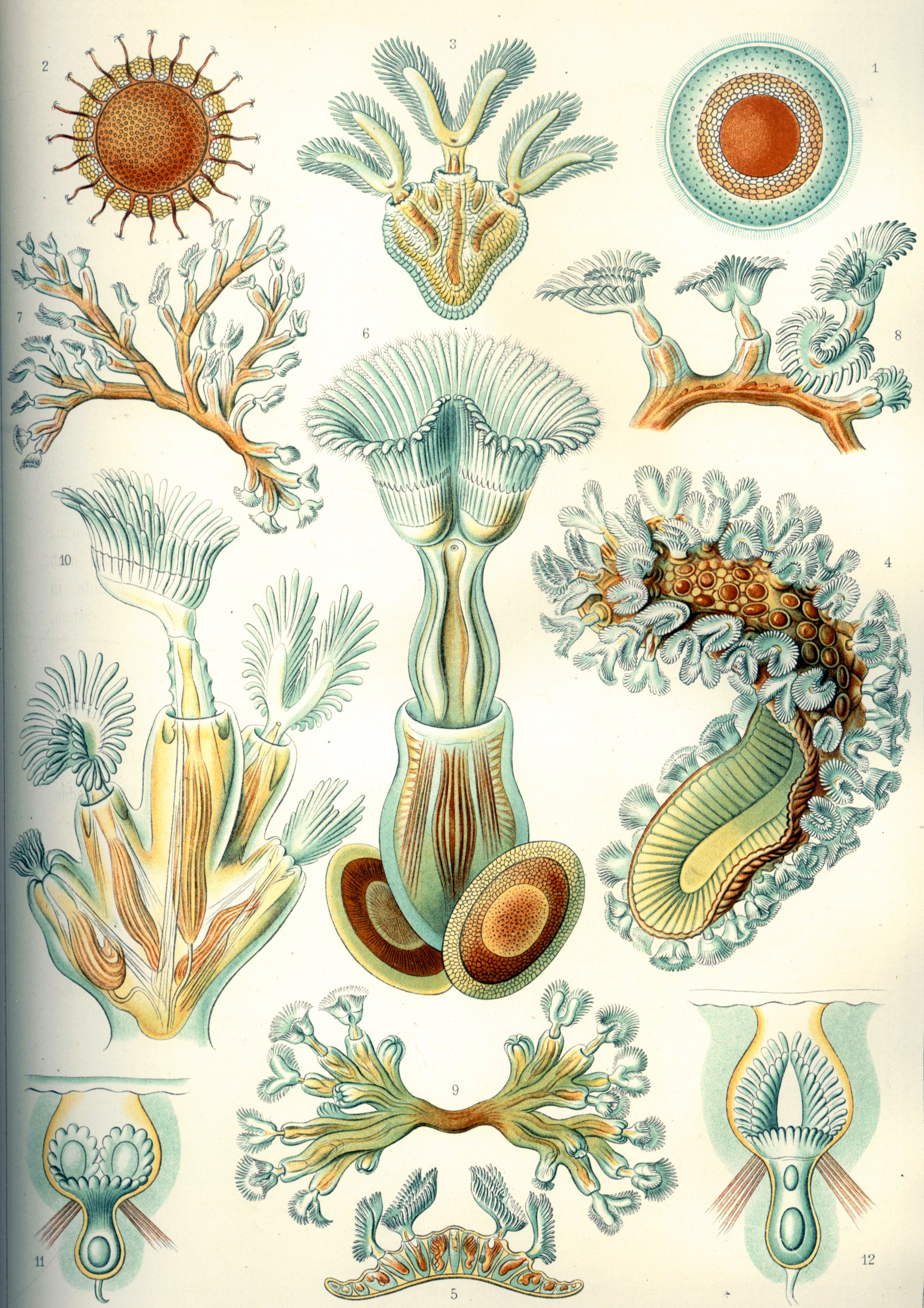
Bryozoa, from Ernst Haeckel's Kunstformen der Natur, 1904

Invertebrates are grouped into different phyla. Informally phyla can be thought of as a way of grouping organisms according to their body plan. A body plan refers to a blueprint which describes the shape or morphology of an organism, such as its symmetry, segmentation and the disposition of its appendages. The idea of body plans originated with vertebrates, which were grouped into one phylum. But the vertebrate body plan is only one of many, and invertebrates consist of many phyla or body plans. The history of the discovery of body plans can be seen as a movement from a worldview centred on vertebrates, to seeing the vertebrates as one body plan among many. Among the pioneering zoologists, Linnaeus identified two body plans outside the vertebrates; Cuvier identified three; and Haeckel had four, as well as the Protista with eight more, for a total of twelve. For comparison, the number of phyla recognised by modern zoologists has risen to 35.

Historically body plans were thought of as having evolved in rapidly during the Cambrian explosion, but a more nuanced understanding of animal evolution suggests a gradual development of body plans throughout the early Palaeozoic and beyond. More generally a phylum can be defined in two ways: as described above, as a group of organisms with a certain degree of morphological or developmental similarity (the phenetic definition), or a group of organisms with a certain degree of evolutionary relatedness (the phylogenetic definition).

As on land and in the air, invertebrates make up a great majority of all macroscopic life, as the vertebrates makes up a subphylum of one of over 30 known animal phyla, making the term almost meaningless for taxonomic purpose. Invertebrate sea life includes the following groups, some of which are phyla:

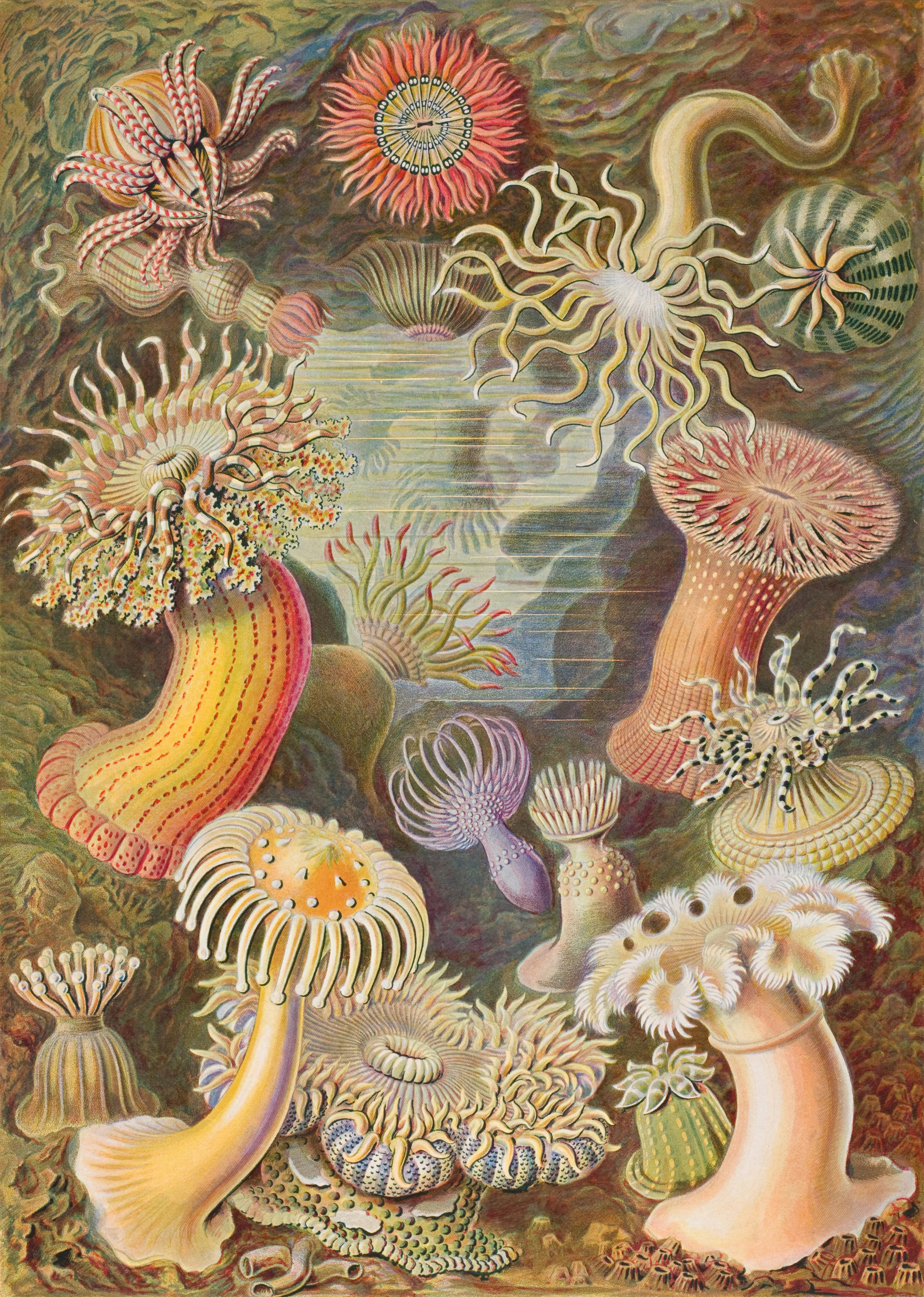
The 49th plate from Ernst Haeckel's Kunstformen der Natur, 1904, showing various sea anemones classified as Actiniae, in the Cnidaria phylum

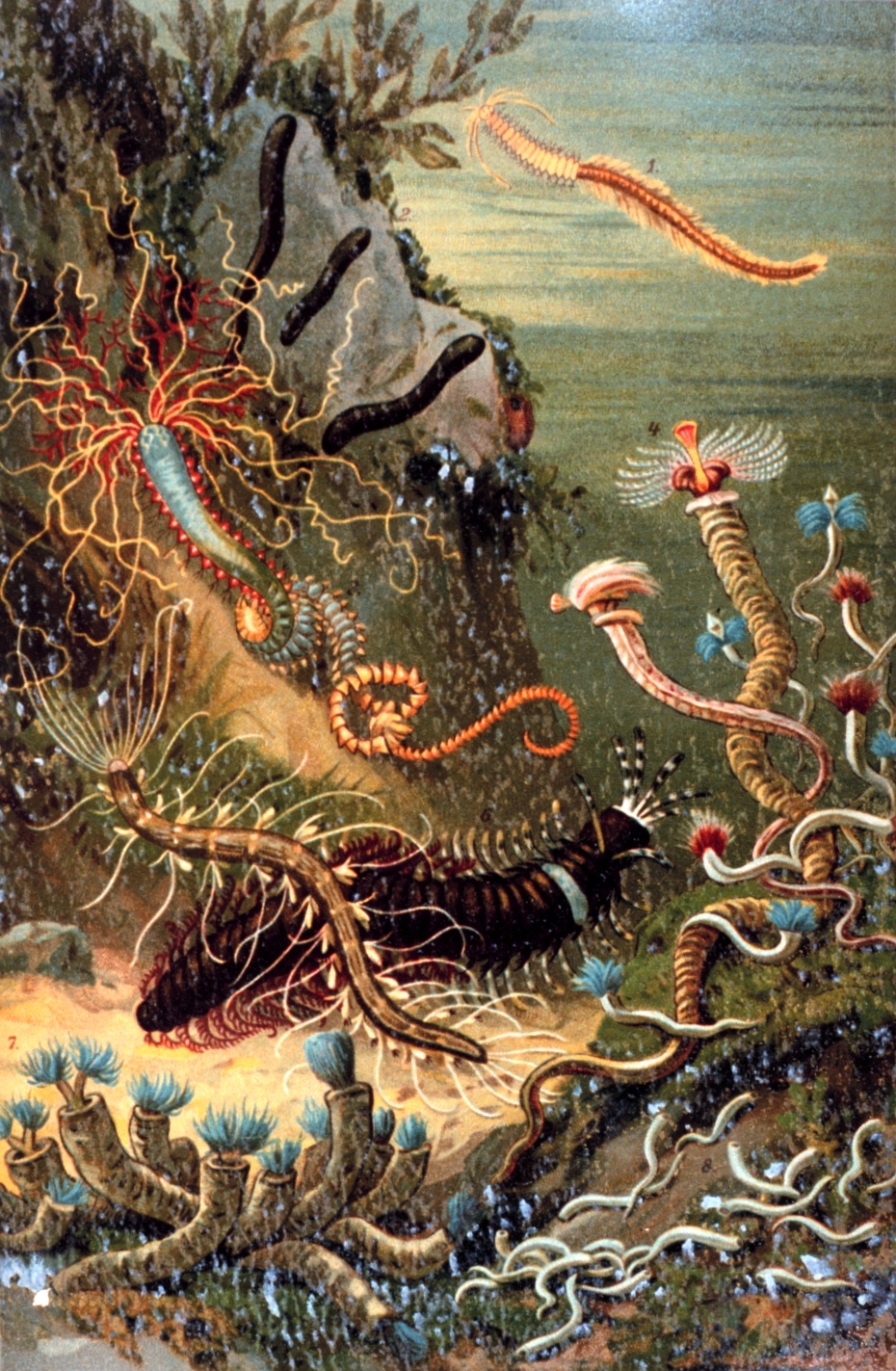
"A variety of marine worms": plate from Das Meer by M.J. Schleiden (1804–1881)

- Acoela, among the most primitive bilateral animals;
- Annelida, (polychaetes and sea leeches);
- Brachiopoda, marine animals that have hard "valves" (shells) on the upper and lower surfaces;
- Bryozoa, also known as moss animals or sea mats;
- Chaetognatha, commonly known as arrow worms, are a phylum of predatory marine worms that are a major component of plankton;
- Cephalochordata represented in the modern oceans by the lancelets (also known as Amphioxus);
- Cnidaria, such as jellyfish, sea anemones, and corals;
- Crustacea, including lobsters, crabs, shrimp, crayfish, barnacles, hermit crabs, mantis shrimps, and copepods;
- Ctenophora, also known as comb jellies, the largest animals that swim by means of cilia;
- Echinodermata, including sea stars, brittle stars, sea urchins, sand dollars, sea cucumbers, crinoids, and sea daisies;
- Echiura, also known as spoon worms;
- Gnathostomulids, slender to thread-like worms, with a transparent body that inhabit sand and mud beneath shallow coastal waters;
- Gastrotricha, often called hairy backs, found mostly interstitially in between sediment particles;
- Hemichordata, includes acorn worms, solitary worm-shaped organisms;
- Kamptozoa, goblet-shaped sessile aquatic animals, with relatively long stalks and a "crown" of solid tentacles, also called Entoprocta;
- Kinorhyncha, segmented, limbless animals, widespread in mud or sand at all depths, also called mud dragons;
- Loricifera, very small to microscopic marine sediment-dwelling animals only discovered in 1983;
- Mollusca, including shellfish, squid, octopus, whelks, Nautilus, cuttlefish, nudibranchs, scallops, sea snails, Aplacophora, Caudofoveata, Monoplacophora, Polyplacophora, and Scaphopoda;
- Myzostomida, a taxonomic group of small marine worms which are parasitic on crinoids or "sea lilies";
- Nemertinea, also known as "ribbon worms" or "proboscis worms";
- Orthonectida, a small phylum of poorly known parasites of marine invertebrates that are among the simplest of multi-cellular organisms;
- Phoronida, a phylum of marine animals that filter-feed with a lophophore (a "crown" of tentacles), and build upright tubes of chitin to support and protect their soft bodies;
- Placozoa, small, flattened, multicellular animals around 1 millimetre across and the simplest in structure. They have no regular outline, although the lower surface is somewhat concave, and the upper surface is always flattened;
- Porifera (sponges), multicellular organisms that have bodies full of pores and channels allowing water to circulate through them;
- Priapulida, or penis worms, are a phylum of marine worms that live marine mud. They are named for their extensible spiny proboscis, which, in some species, may have a shape like that of a human penis;
- Pycnogonida, also called sea spiders, are unrelated to spiders which they resemble;
- Sipunculida, also called peanut worms, is a group containing 144–320 species (estimates vary) of bilaterally symmetrical, unsegmented marine worms;
- Tunicata, also known as sea squirts or sea pork, are filter feeders attached to rocks or similarly suitable surfaces on the ocean floor;
- Some flatworms of the classes Turbellaria and Monogenea;
- Xenoturbella, a genus of bilaterian animals that contains only two marine worm-like species;
- Xiphosura, includes a large number of extinct lineages and only four recent species in the family Limulidae, which include the horseshoe crabs.

Arthropods total about 1,113,000 described extant species, molluscs about 85,000 and chordates about 52,000.

== Marine sponges ==
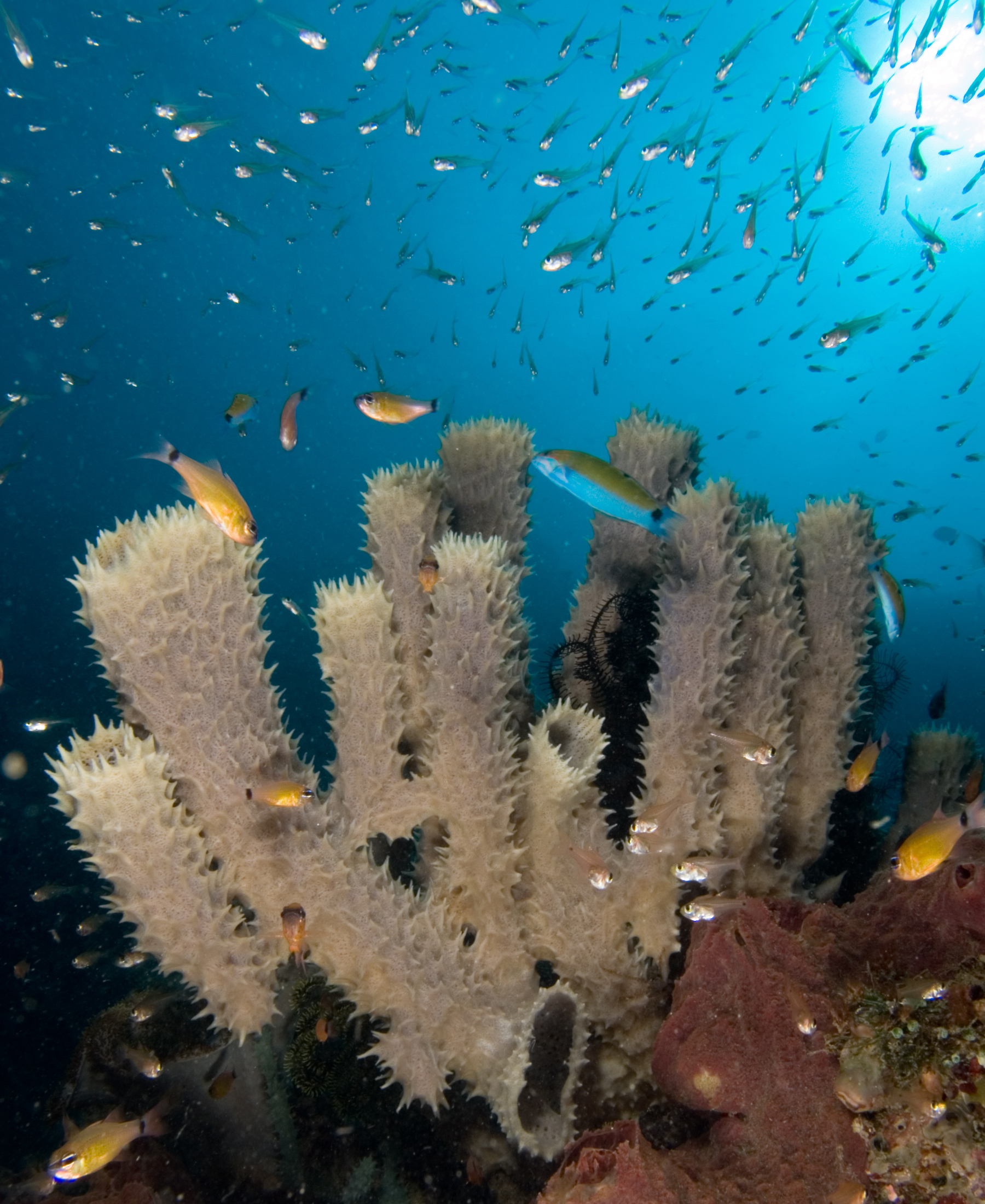
Sponges have no nervous, digestive or circulatory system

Sponges are animals of the phylum Porifera (Modern Latin for bearing pores). They are multicellular organisms that have bodies full of pores and channels allowing water to circulate through them, consisting of jelly-like mesohyl sandwiched between two thin layers of cells. They have unspecialized cells that can transform into other types and that often migrate between the main cell layers and the mesohyl in the process. Sponges do not have nervous, digestive or circulatory systems. Instead, most rely on maintaining a constant water flow through their bodies to obtain food and oxygen and to remove wastes.

Sponges are similar to other animals in that they are multicellular, heterotrophic, lack cell walls and produce sperm cells. Unlike other animals, they lack true tissues and organs, and have no body symmetry. The shapes of their bodies are adapted for maximal efficiency of water flow through the central cavity, where it deposits nutrients, and leaves through a hole called the osculum. Many sponges have internal skeletons of spongin and/or spicules of calcium carbonate or silicon dioxide. All sponges are sessile aquatic animals. Although there are freshwater species, the great majority are marine (salt water) species, ranging from tidal zones to depths exceeding 8,800 m (5.5 mi).

While most of the approximately 5,000–10,000 known species feed on bacteria and other food particles in the water, some host photosynthesizing micro-organisms as endosymbionts and these alliances often produce more food and oxygen than they consume. A few species of sponge that live in food-poor environments have become carnivores that prey mainly on small crustaceans.

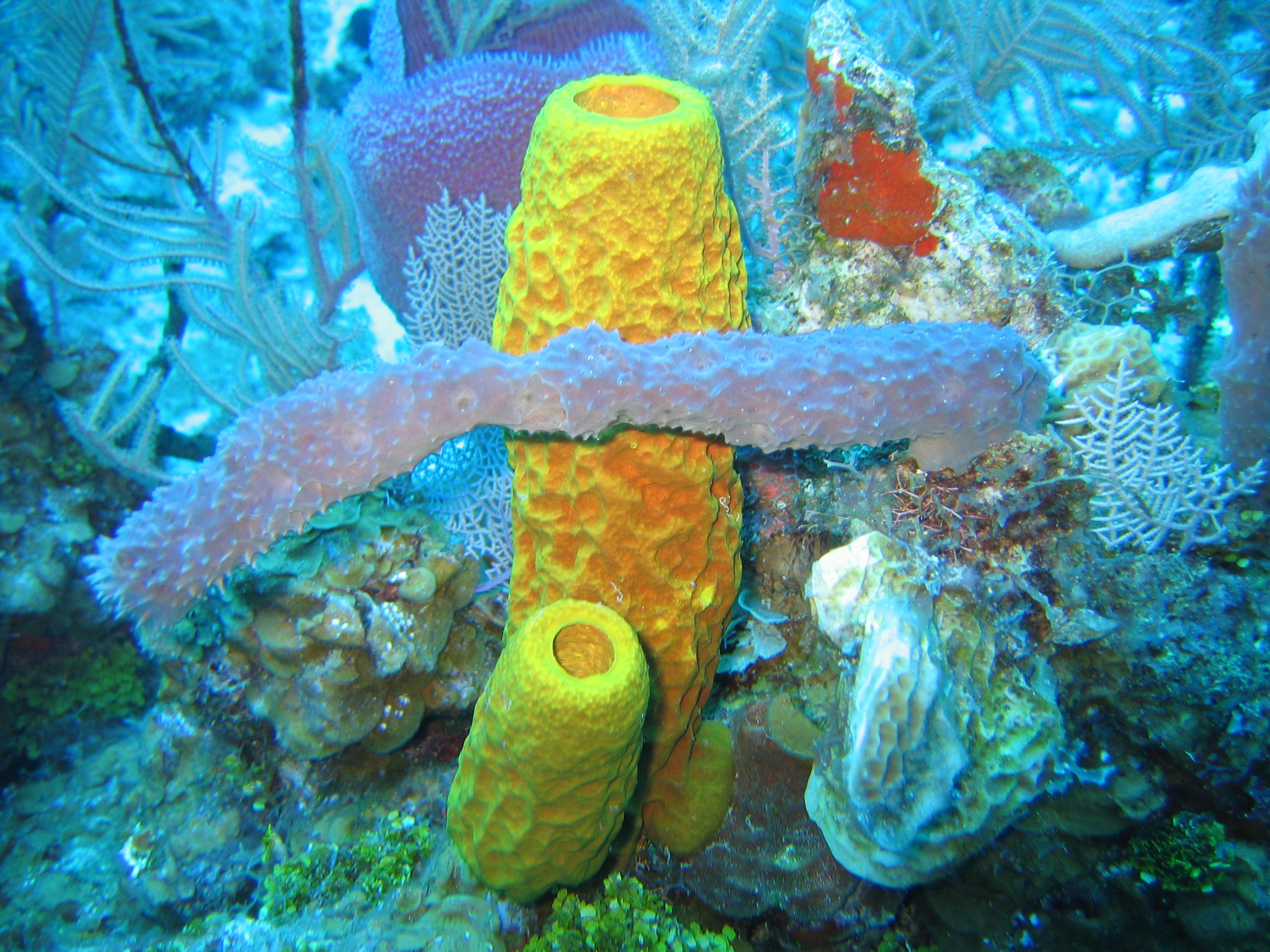
Sponge biodiversity. There are four sponge species in this photo.

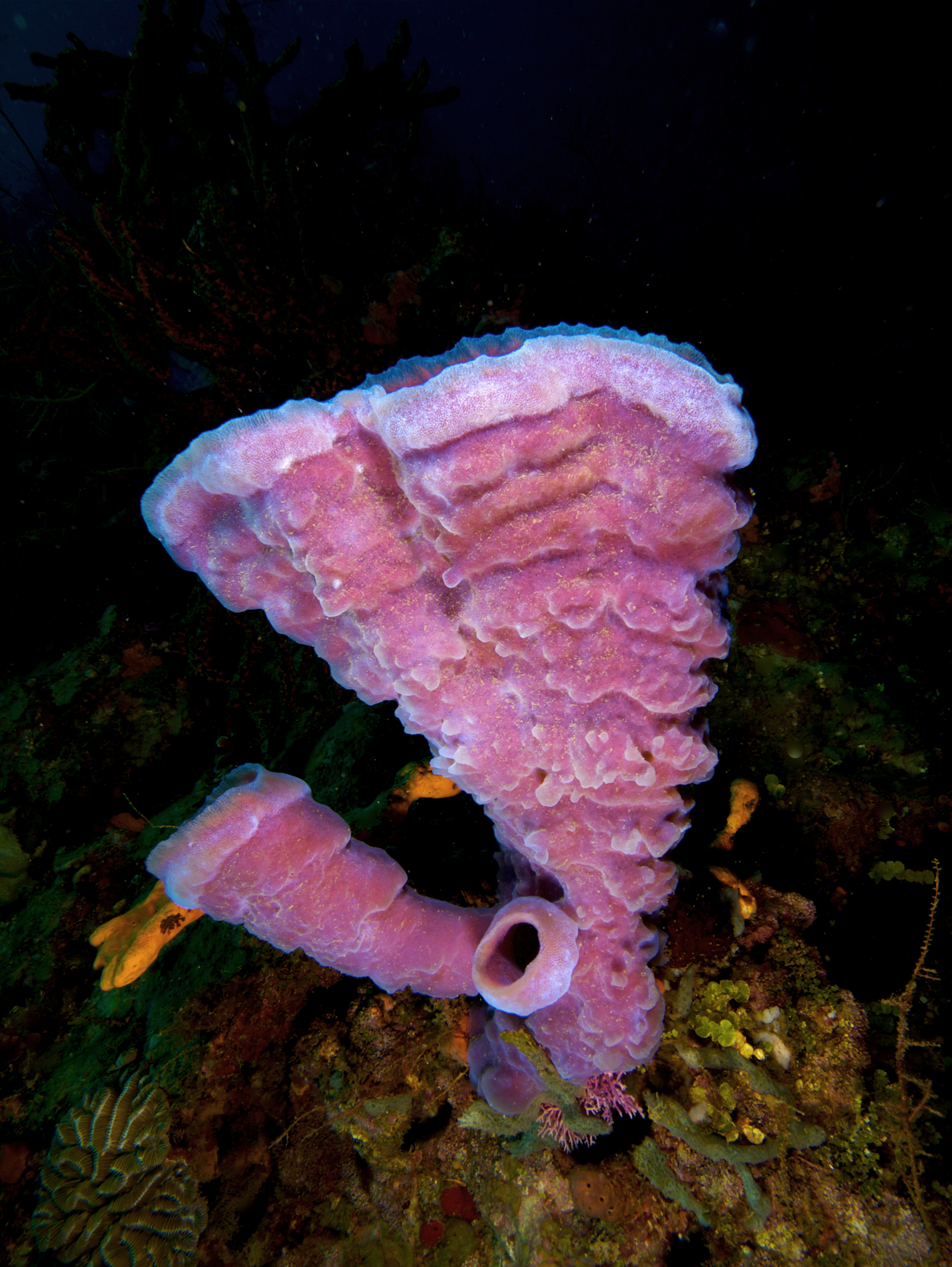
Branching vase sponge

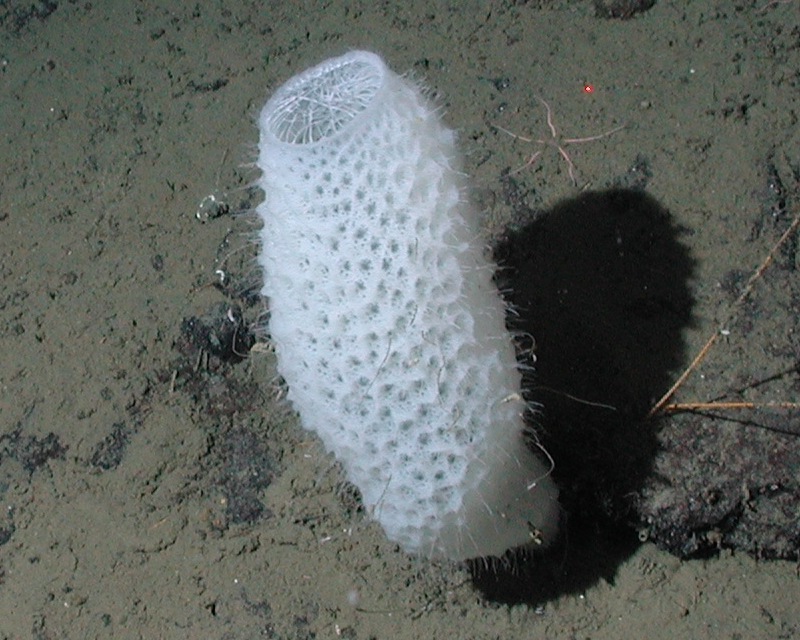
Venus' flower basket at a depth of 2572 meters

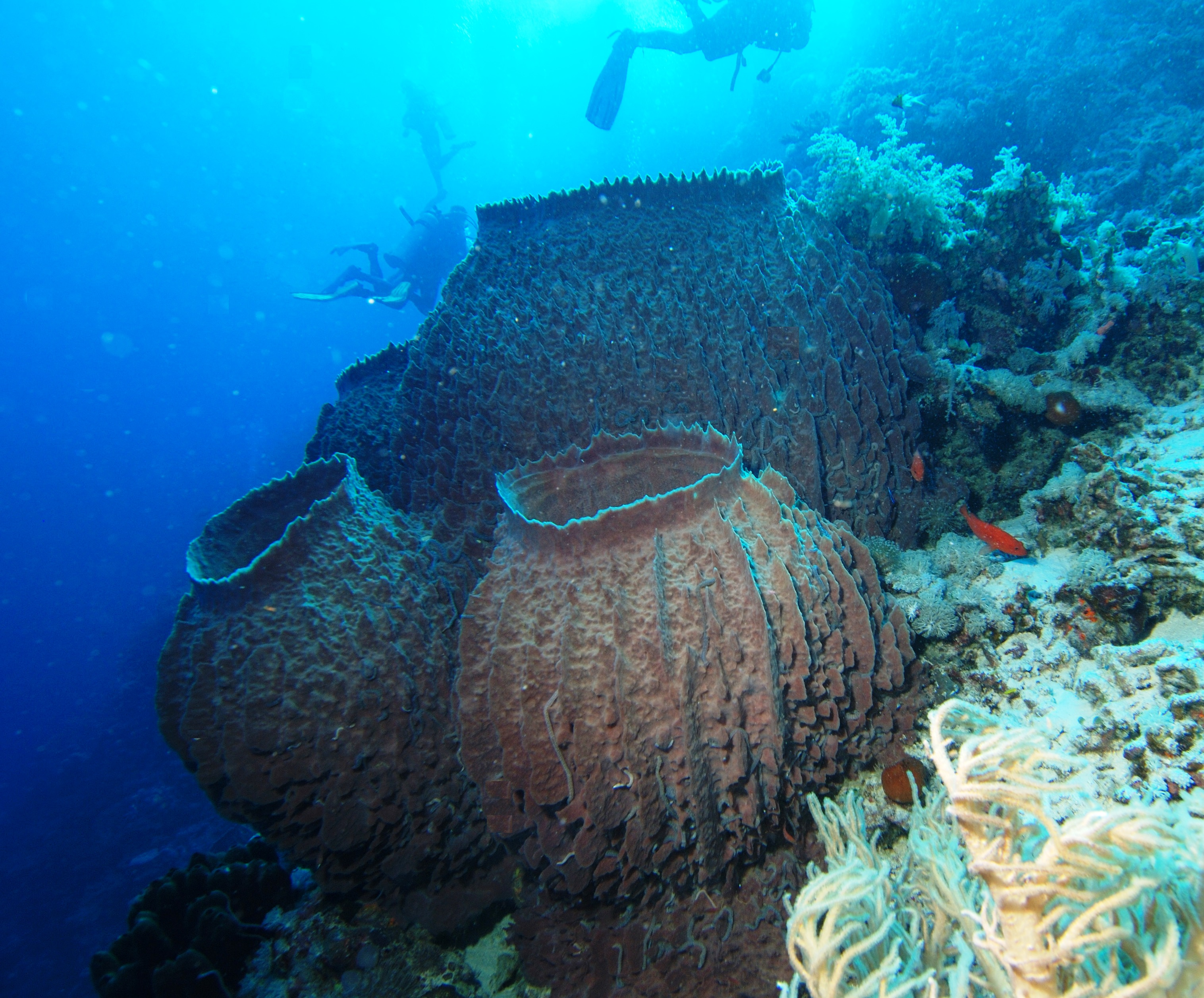
Barrel sponge

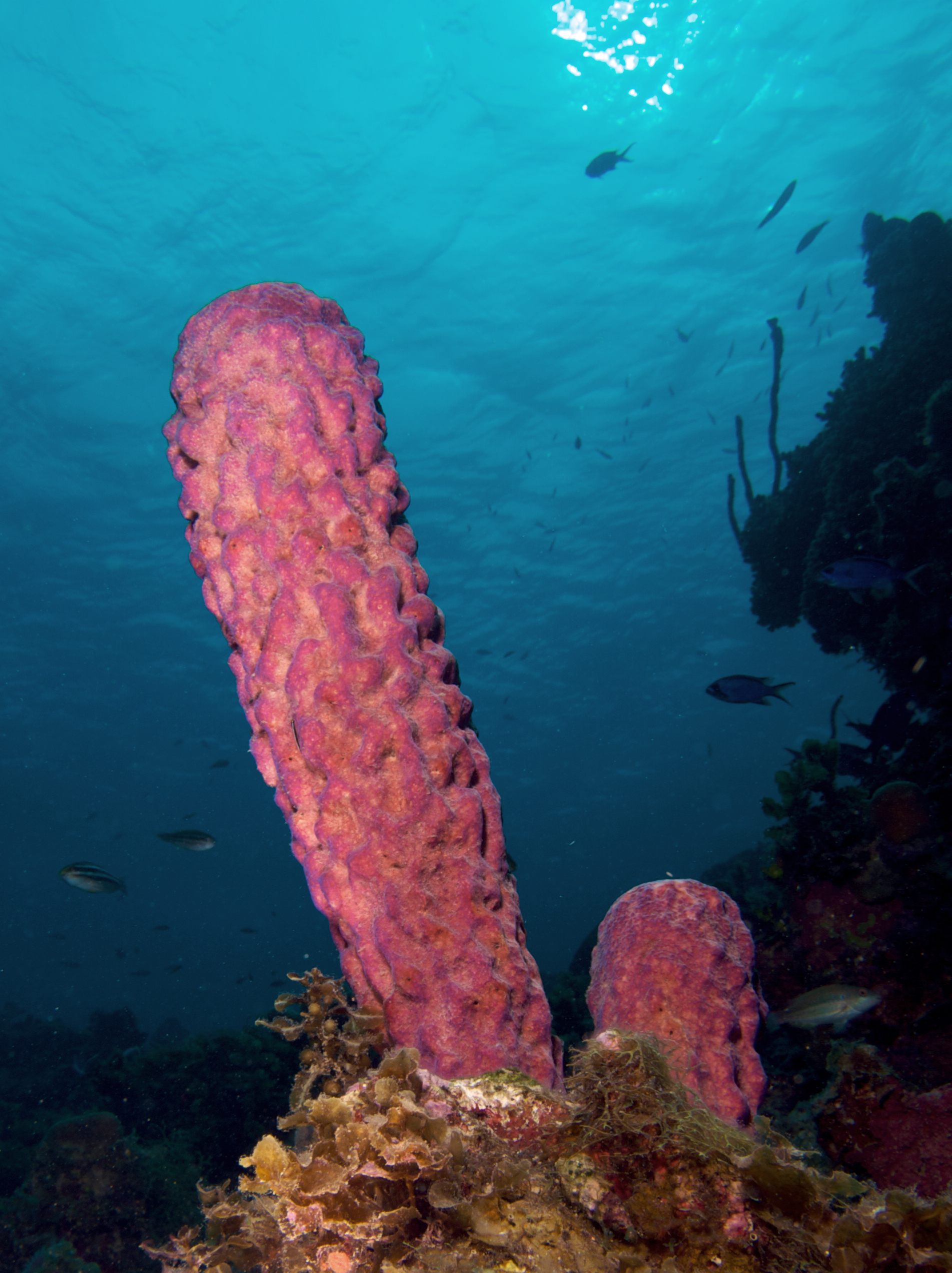
Stove-pipe sponge

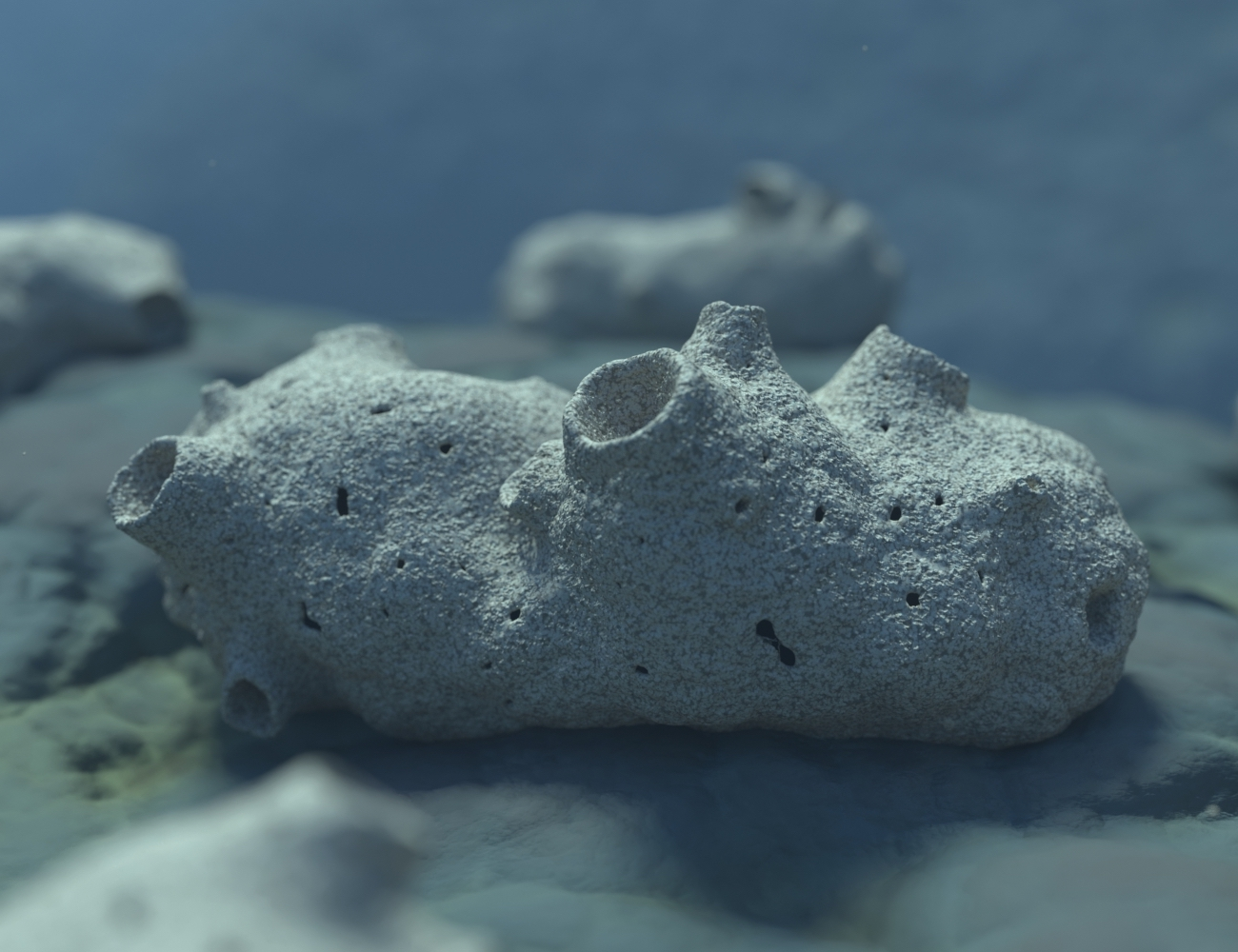
Reconstruction of Otavia antiqua, possibly the first animal about 760 million years ago

Linnaeus mistakenly identified sponges as plants in the order Algae. For a long time thereafter sponges were assigned to a separate subkingdom, Parazoa (meaning beside the animals). They are now classified as a paraphyletic phylum from which the higher animals have evolved.

== Marine cnidarians ==
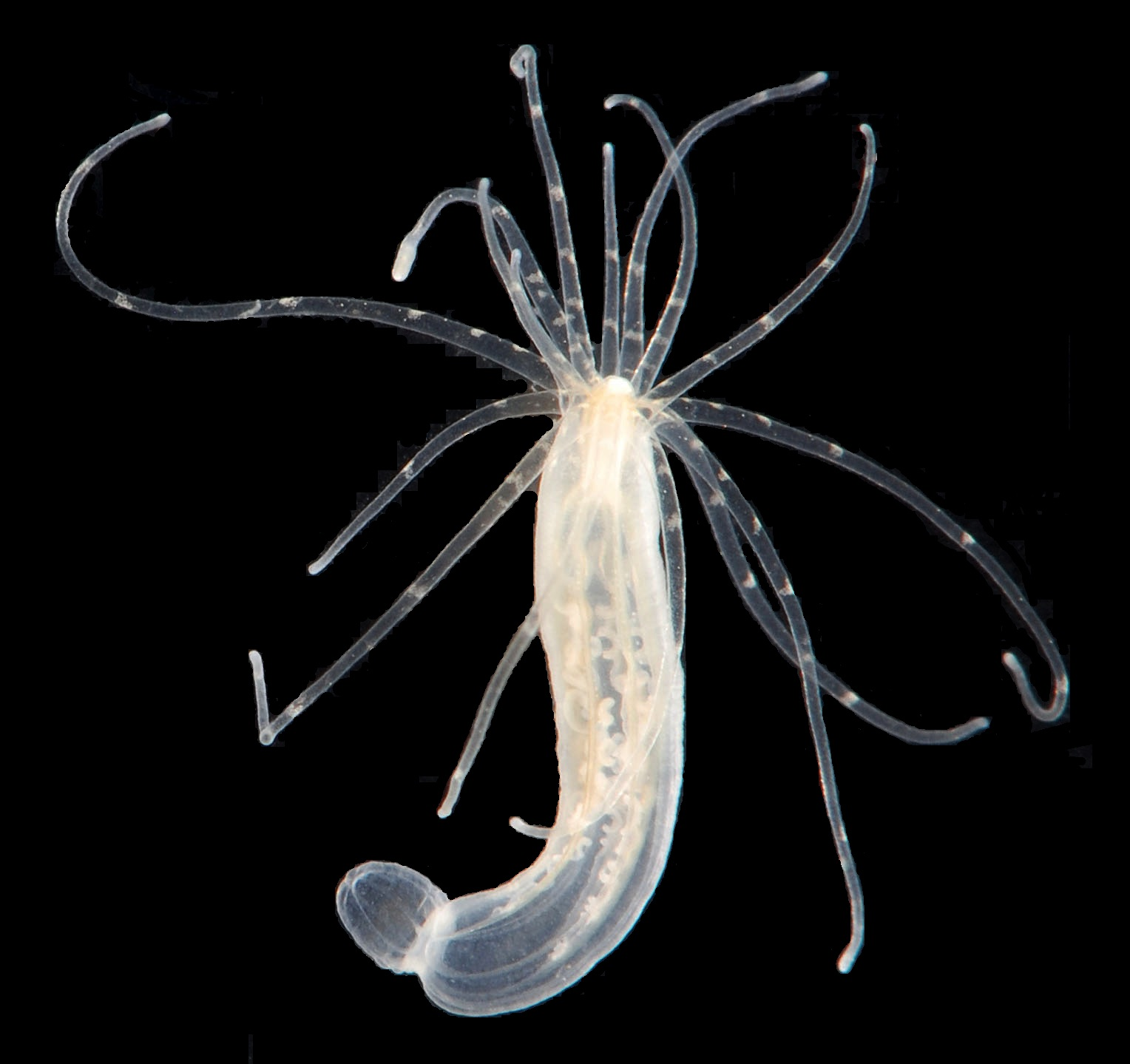
Cnidarians are the simplest animals with cells organised into tissues. Yet the starlet sea anemone contains the same genes as those that form the vertebrate head.

Cnidarians (Greek for nettle) are distinguished by the presence of stinging cells, specialized cells that they use mainly for capturing prey. Cnidarians include corals, sea anemones, jellyfish and hydrozoans. They form a phylum containing over 10,000 species of animals found exclusively in aquatic (mainly marine) environments. Their bodies consist of mesoglea, a non-living jelly-like substance, sandwiched between two layers of epithelium that are mostly one cell thick. They have two basic body forms: swimming medusae and sessile polyps, both of which are radially symmetrical with mouths surrounded by tentacles that bear cnidocytes. Both forms have a single orifice and body cavity that are used for digestion and respiration.

Fossil cnidarians have been found in rocks formed about 580 million years ago. Fossils of cnidarians that do not build mineralized structures are rare. Scientists currently think cnidarians, ctenophores and bilaterians are more closely related to calcareous sponges than these are to other sponges, and that anthozoans are the evolutionary "aunts" or "sisters" of other cnidarians, and the most closely related to bilaterians.

Cnidarians are the simplest animals in which the cells are organised into tissues. The starlet sea anemone is used as a model organism in research. It is easy to care for in the laboratory and a protocol has been developed which can yield large numbers of embryos on a daily basis. There is a remarkable degree of similarity in the gene sequence conservation and complexity between the sea anemone and vertebrates. In particular, genes concerned in the formation of the head in vertebrates are also present in the anemone.

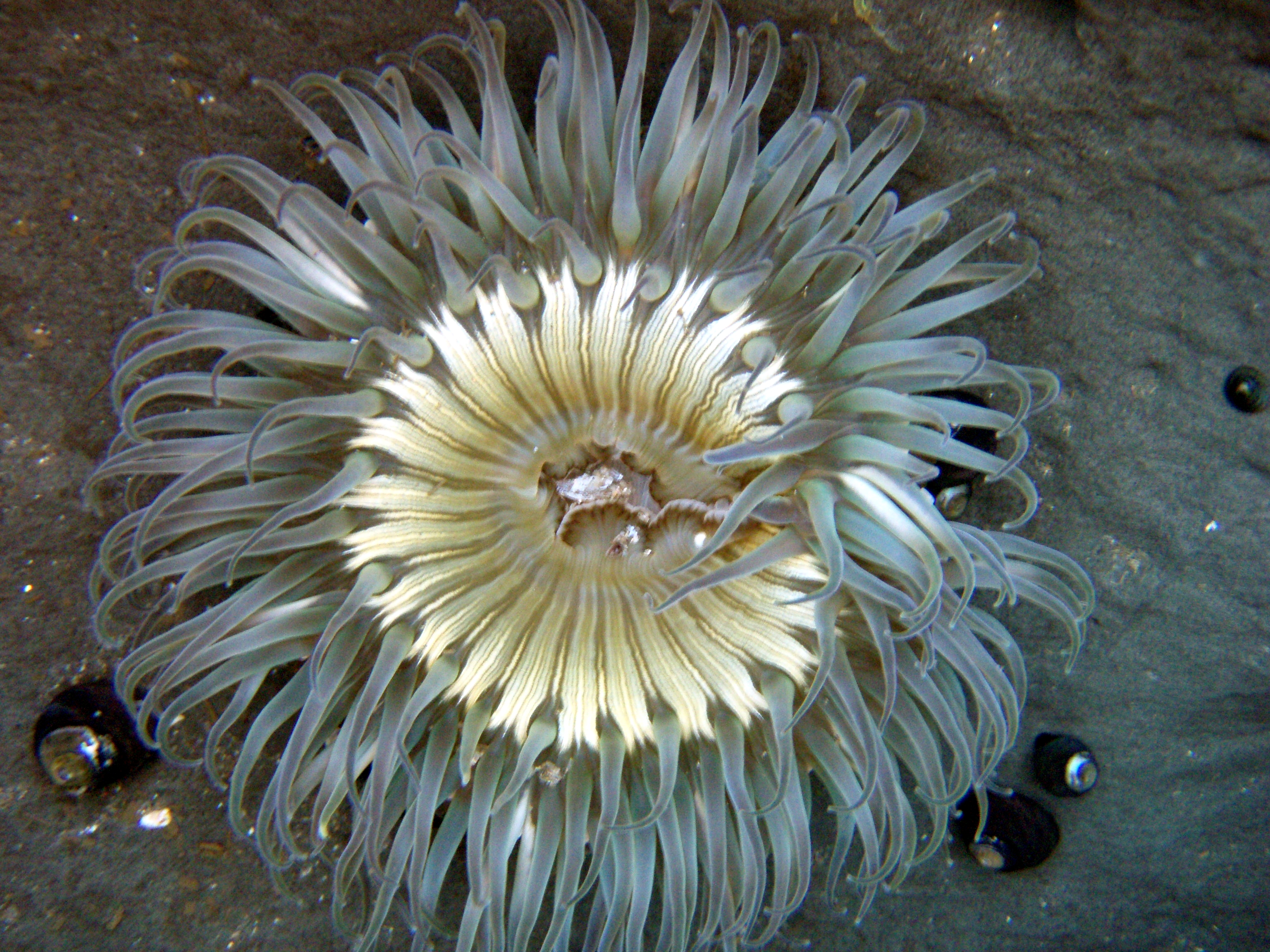
Sea anemones are common in tidepools

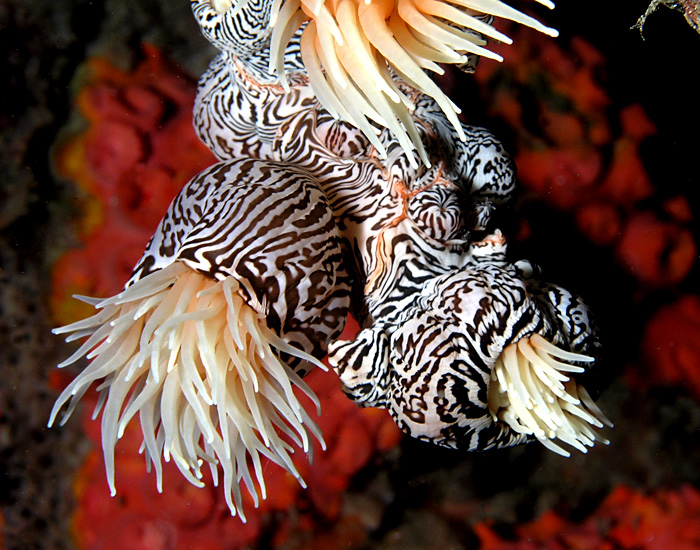
Their tentacles sting and paralyse small fish

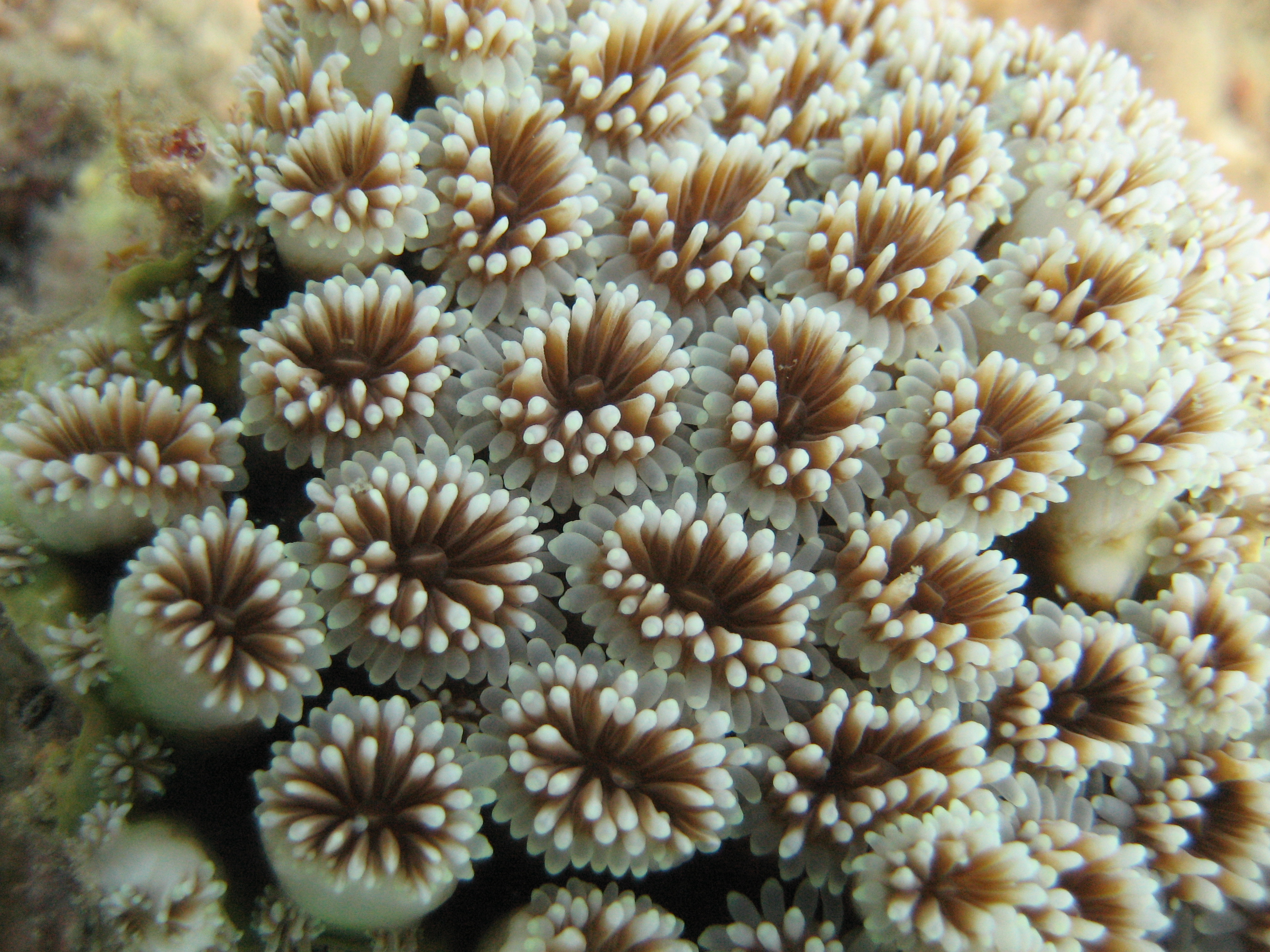
Close up of polyps on the surface of a coral, waving their tentacles.

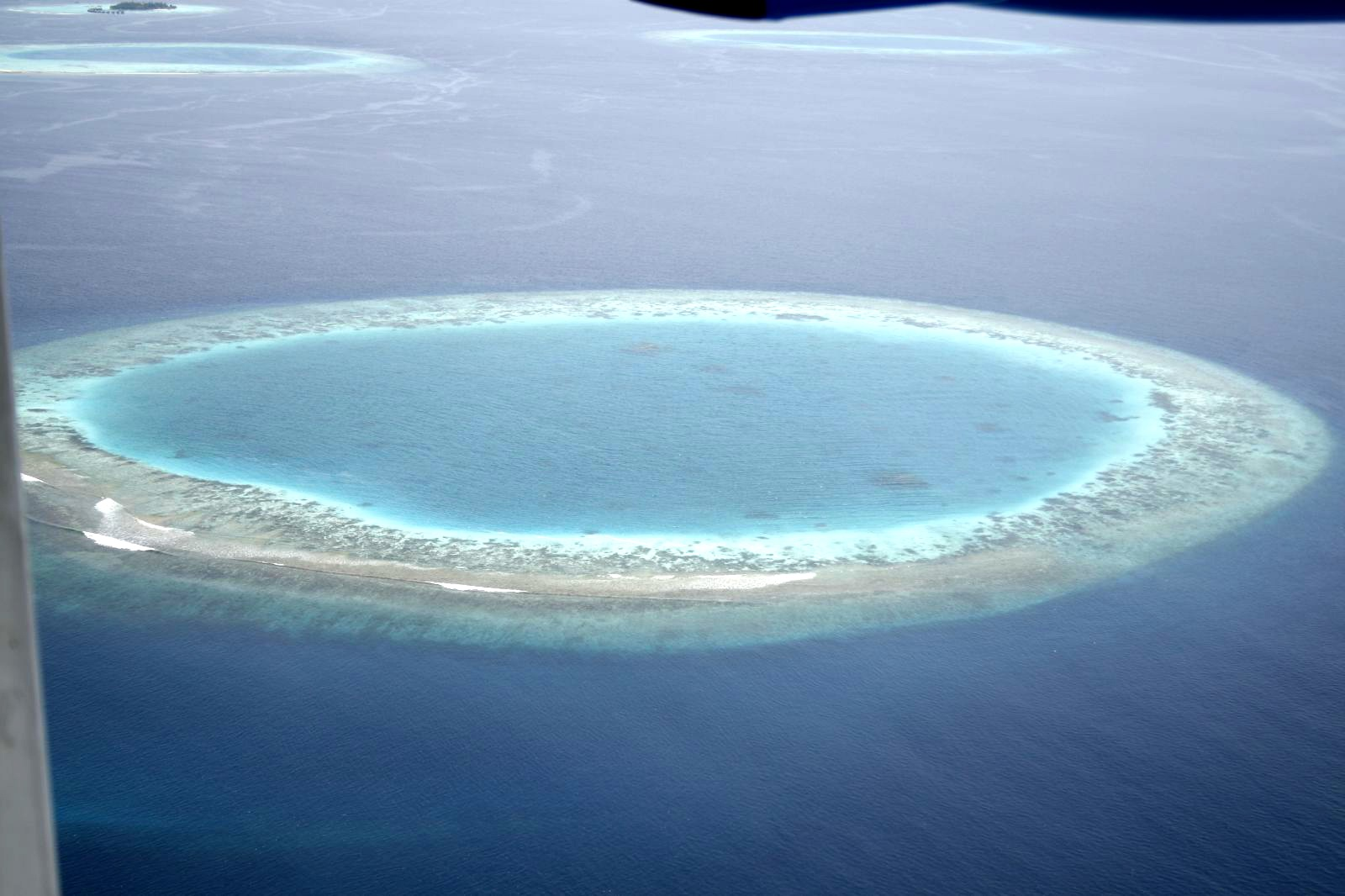
If an island sinks below the sea, coral growth can keep pace with the rising water and form an atoll
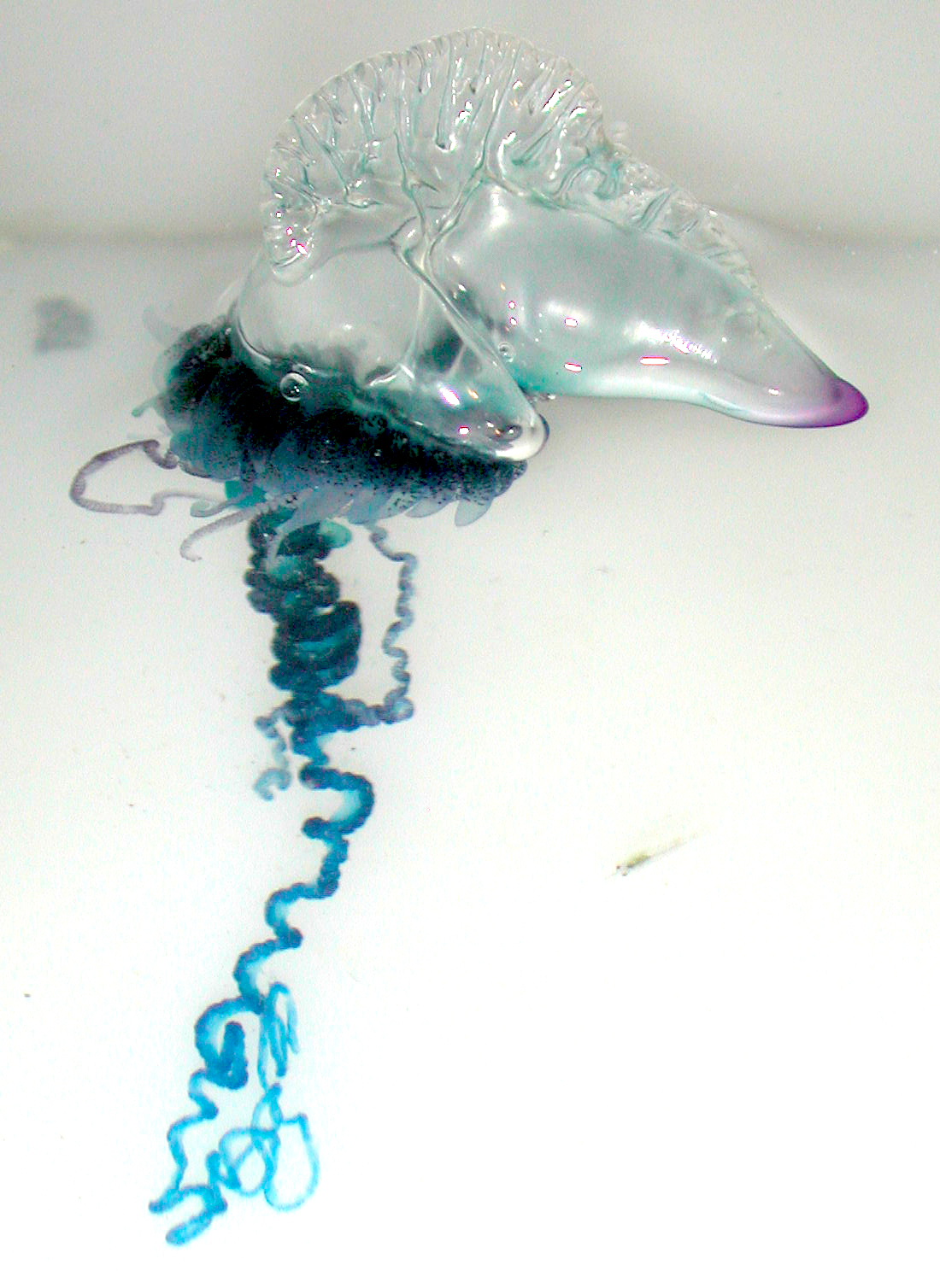
Portuguese man o' war

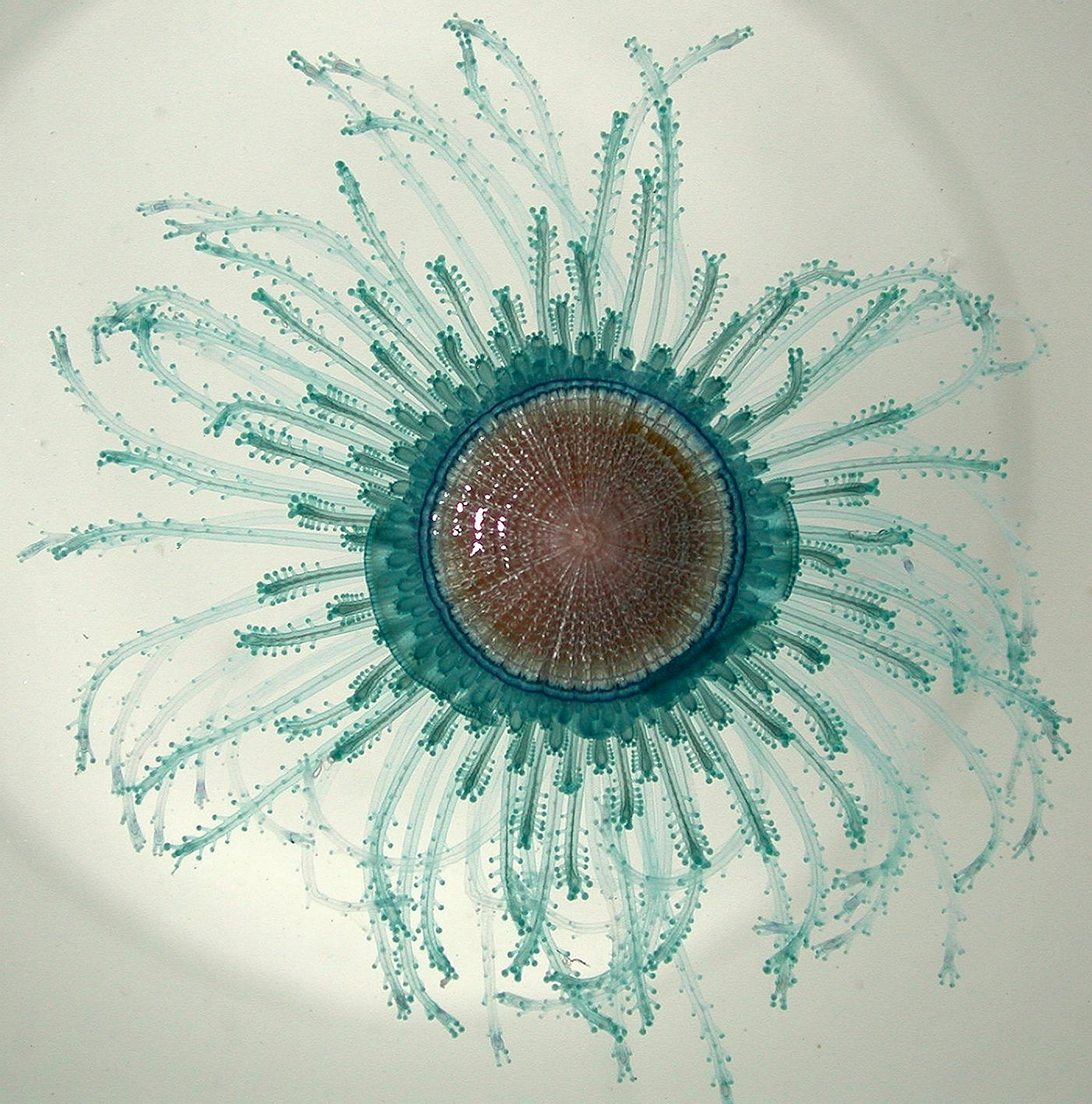
Porpita porpita

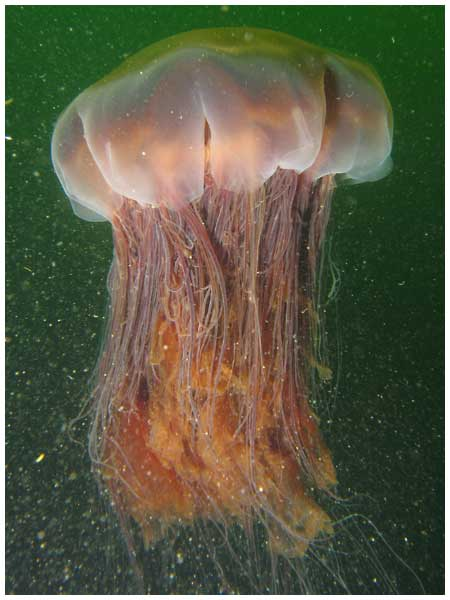
Lion's mane jellyfish, largest known jellyfish

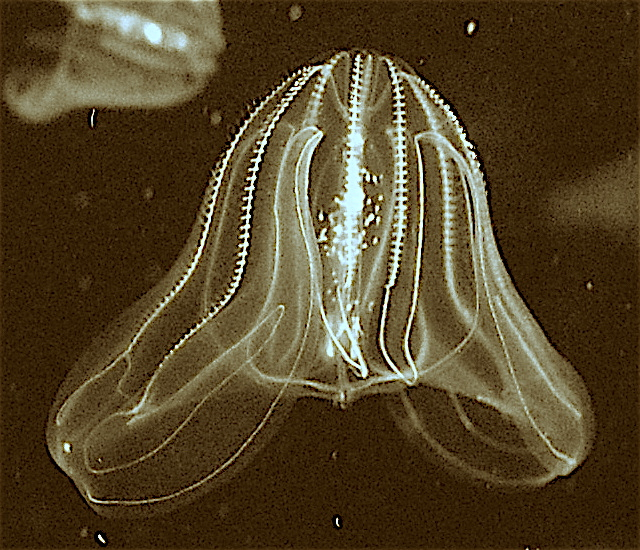
The bioluminescence sea walnut has a transient anus which forms only when it needs to defecate

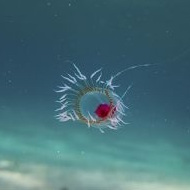
Turritopsis dohrnii achieves biological immortality by transferring its cells back to childhood

== Marine worms ==
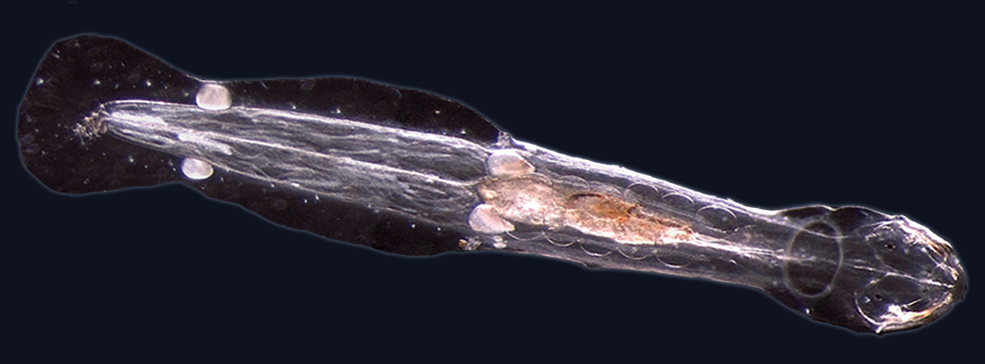
Arrow worms are predatory components of plankton worldwide.

Worms (Old English for serpent) typically have long cylindrical tube-like bodies and no limbs. Marine worms vary in size from microscopic to over 1 metre (3.3 ft) in length for some marine polychaete worms (bristle worms) and up to 58 metres (190 ft) for the marine nemertean worm (bootlace worm). Some marine worms occupy a small variety of parasitic niches, living inside the bodies of other animals, while others live more freely in the marine environment or by burrowing underground.

Different groups of marine worms are related only distantly, so they are found in several different phyla such as the Annelida (segmented worms), Chaetognatha (arrow worms), Hemichordata, and Phoronida (horseshoe worms). Many of these worms have specialized tentacles used for exchanging oxygen and carbon dioxide and also may be used for reproduction. Some marine worms are tube worms, such as the giant tube worm which lives in waters near underwater volcanoes and can withstand temperatures up to 90 degrees Celsius.

Platyhelminthes (flatworms) form another worm phylum which includes a class Cestoda of parasitic tapeworms. The marine tapeworm Polygonoporus giganticus, found in the gut of sperm whales, can grow to over 30 m (100 ft).

Nematodes (roundworms) constitute a further worm phylum with tubular digestive systems and an opening at both ends. Over 25,000 nematode species have been described, of which more than half are parasitic. It has been estimated another million remain undescribed. They are ubiquitous in marine, freshwater and terrestrial environments, where they often outnumber other animals in both individual and species counts. They are found in every part of the Earth's lithosphere, from the top of mountains to the bottom of oceanic trenches. By count they represent 90% of all animals on the ocean floor. Their numerical dominance, often exceeding a million individuals per square meter and accounting for about 80% of all individual animals on earth, their diversity of life cycles, and their presence at various trophic levels point at an important role in many ecosystems.

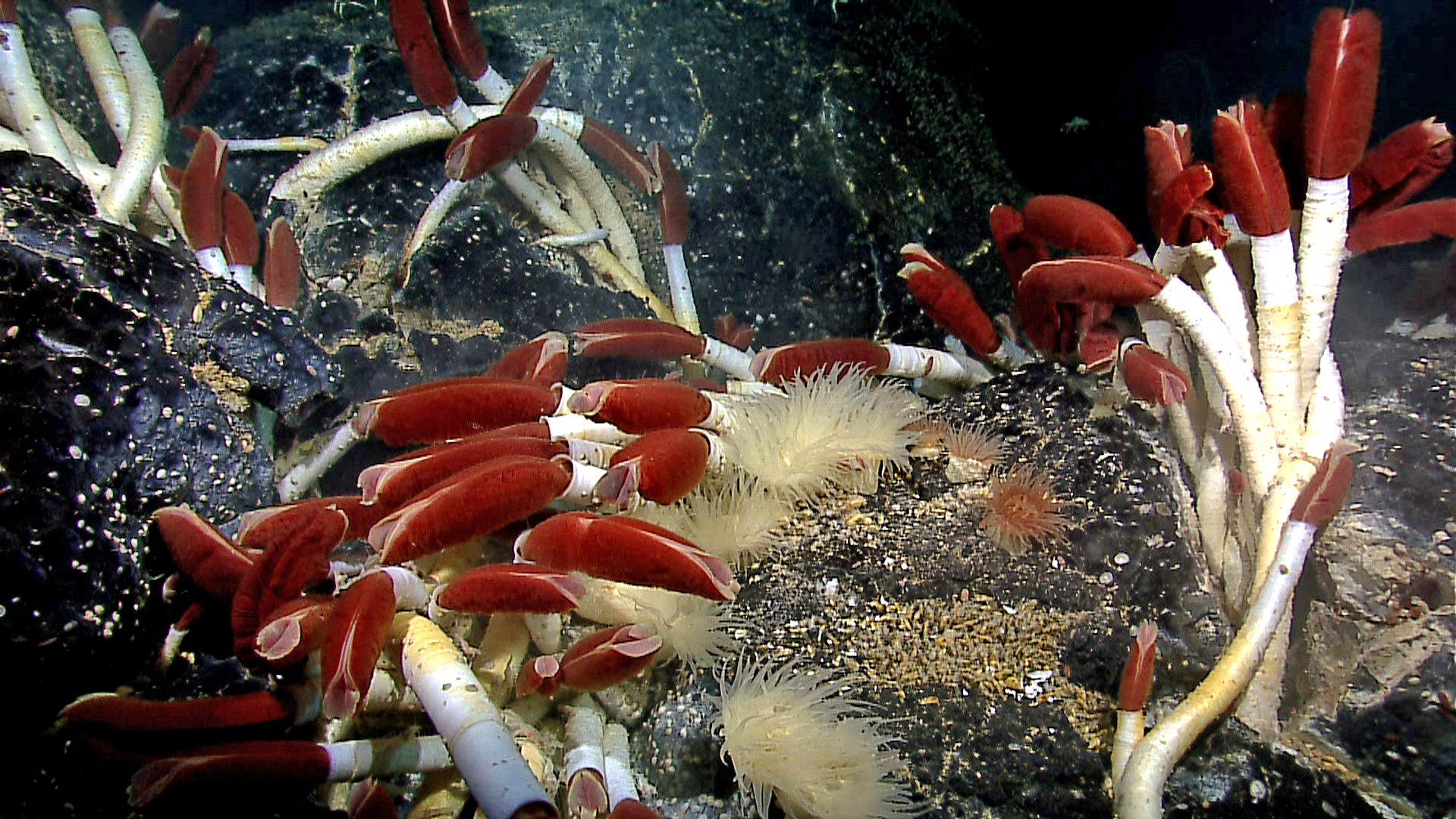
Giant tube worms cluster around hydrothermal vents

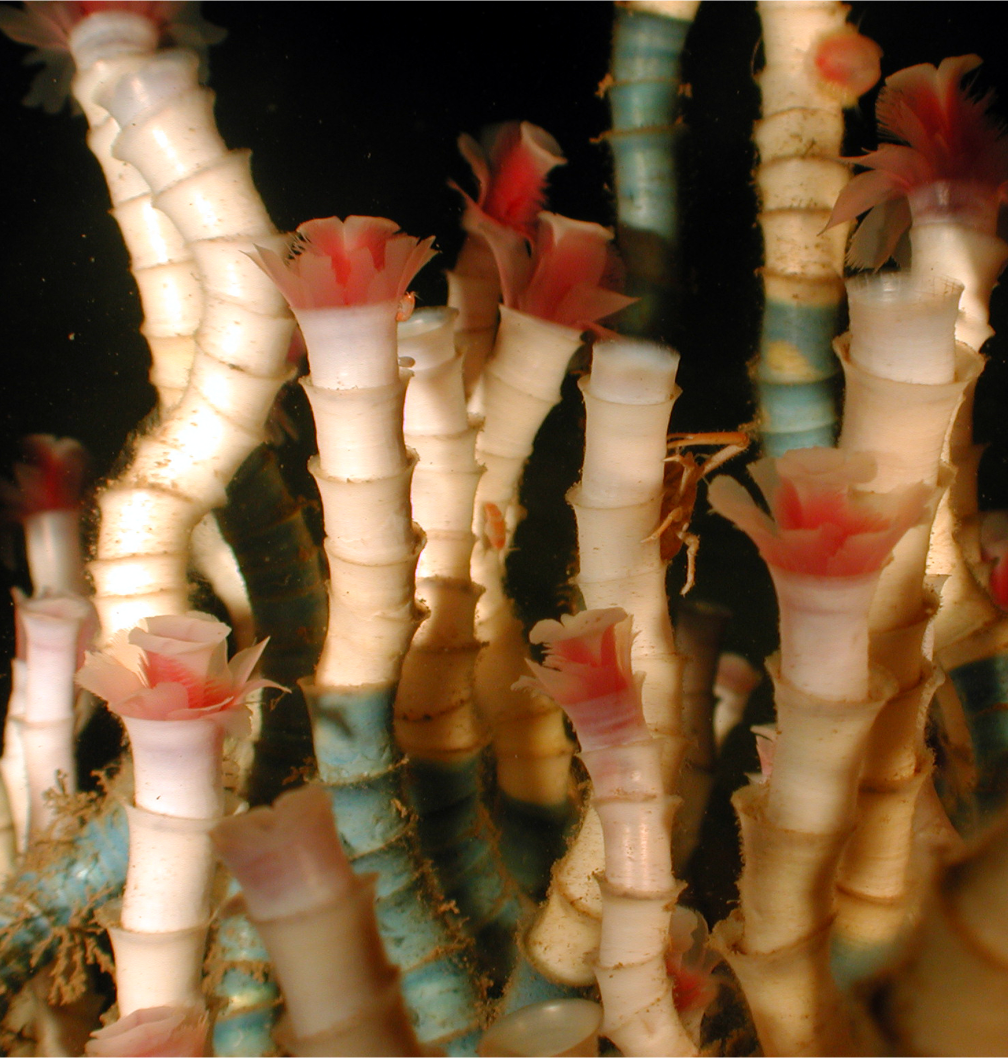
Lamellibrachia luymes, a cold seep tubeworm, lives over 250 years.

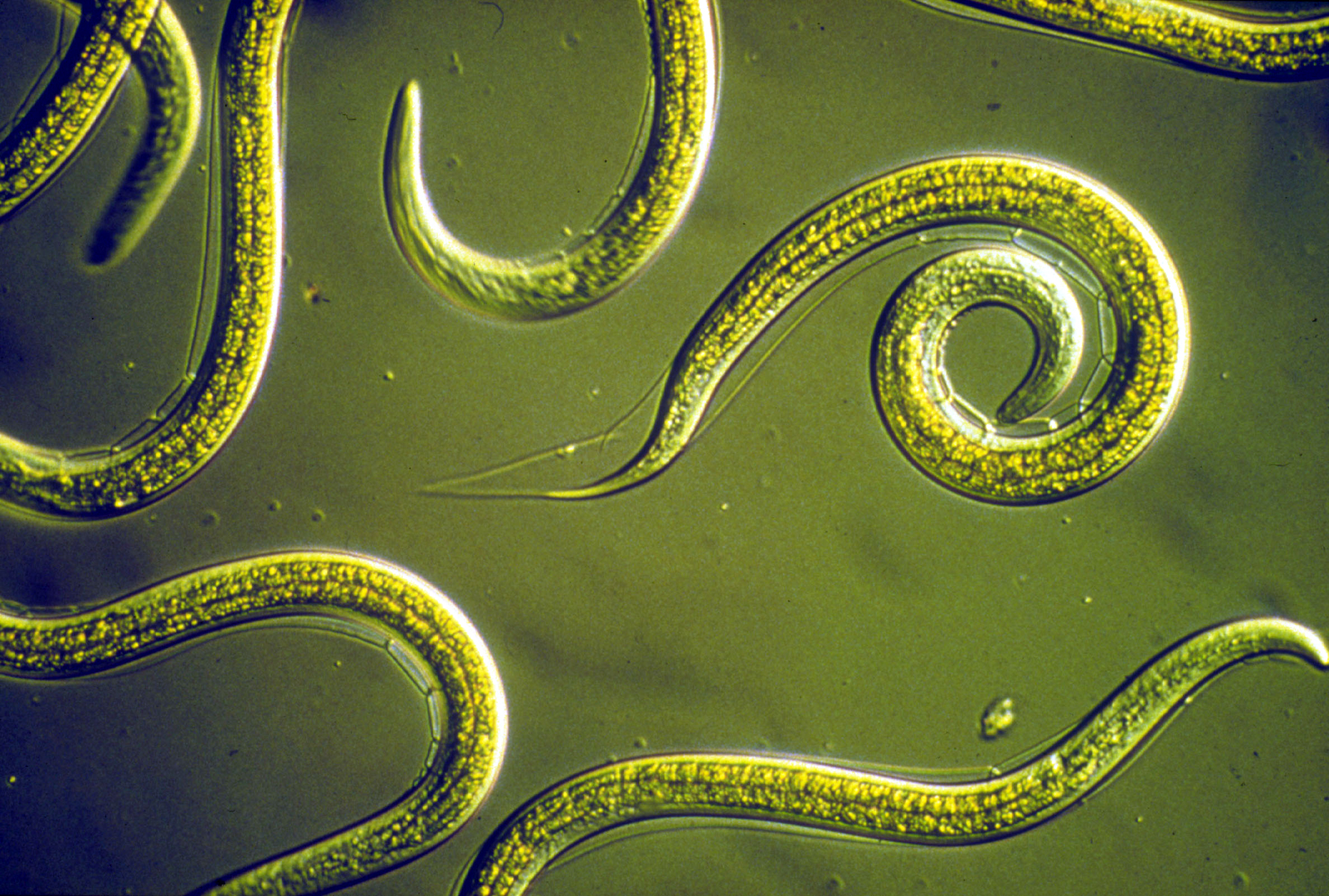
Nematodes are ubiquitous pseudocoelomates which can parasite marine plants and animals.

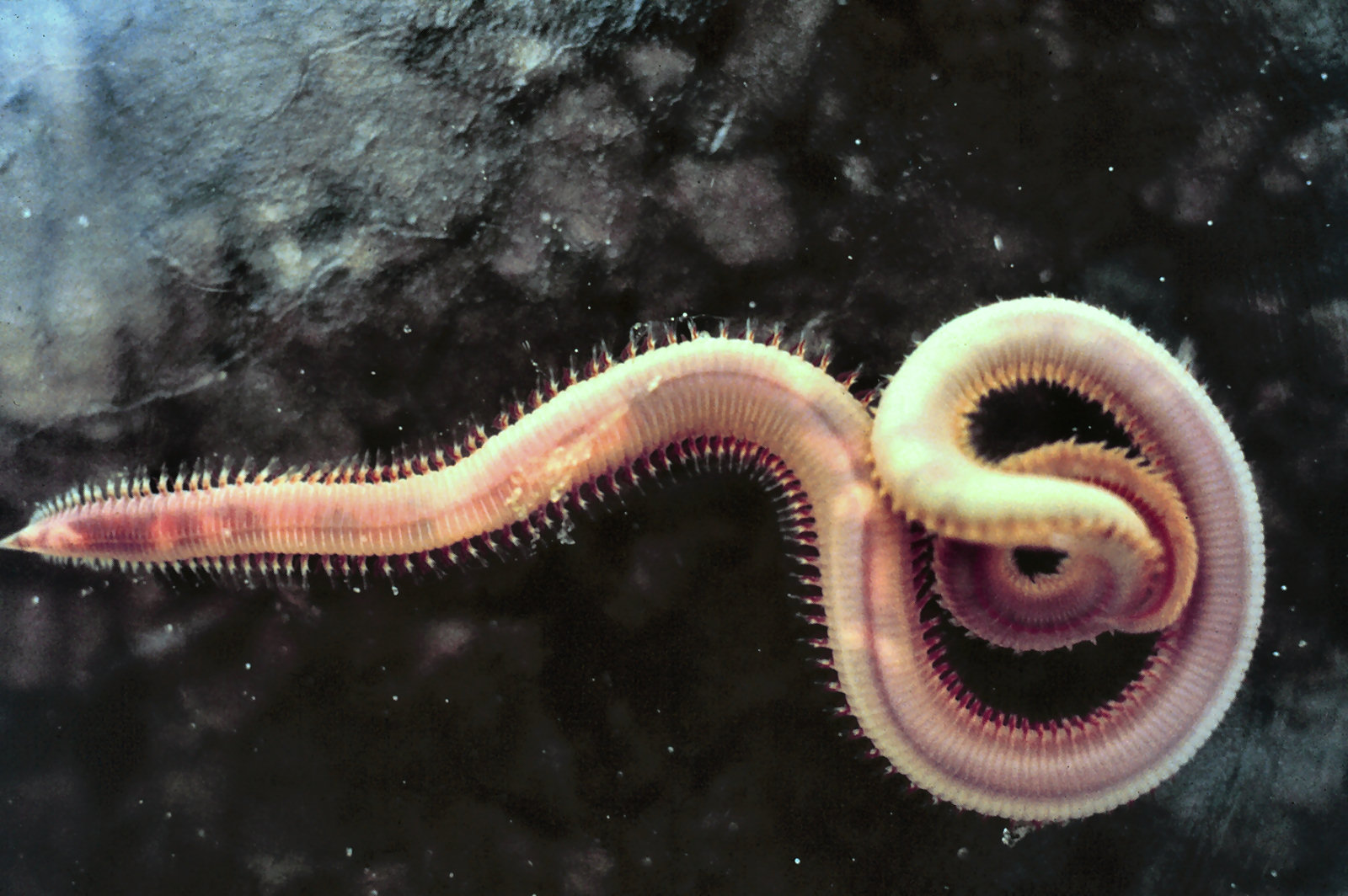
Bloodworms are typically found on the bottom of shallow marine waters

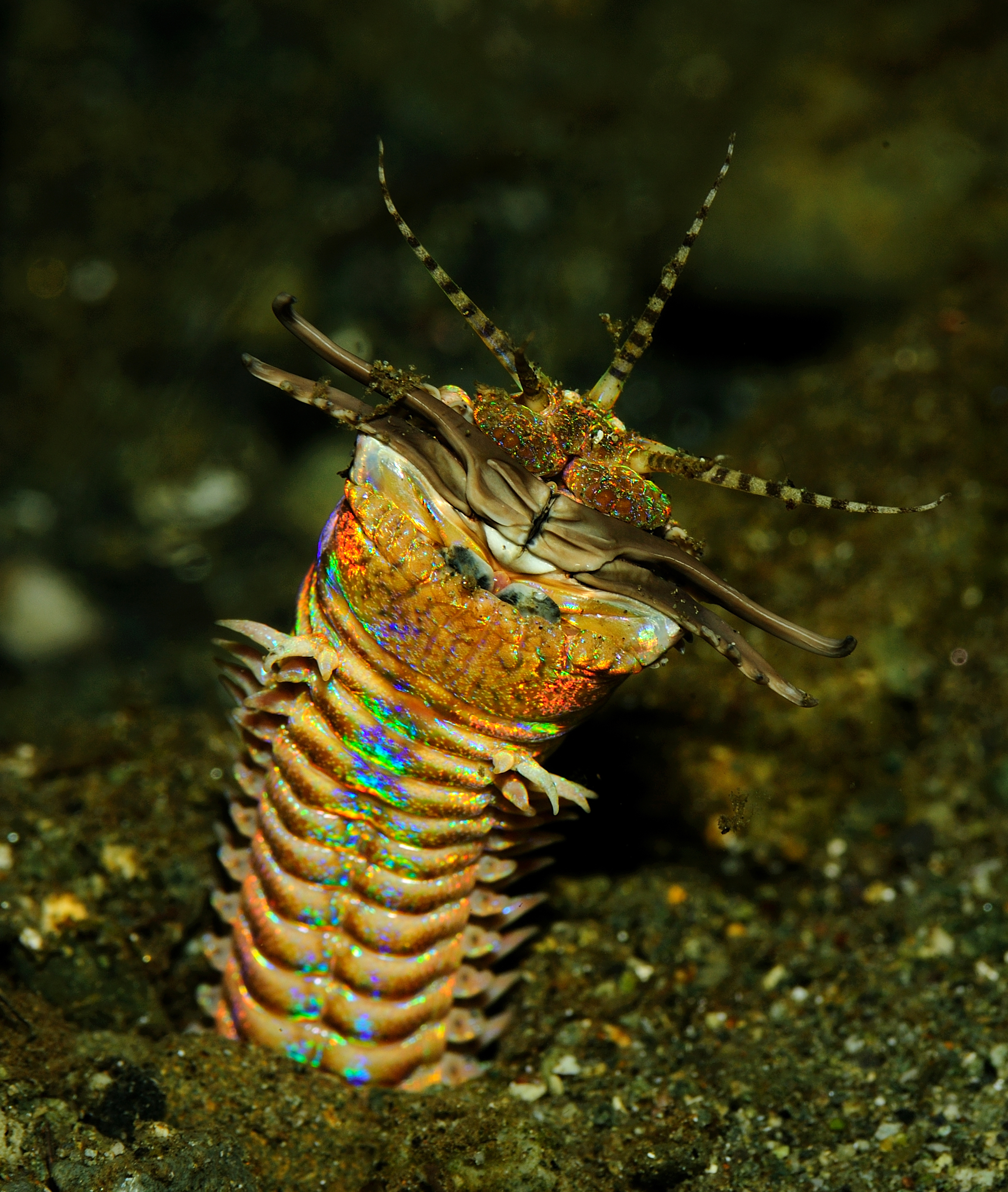
Bobbit worms are ambush predators that live on the seafloor

== Echinoderms ==
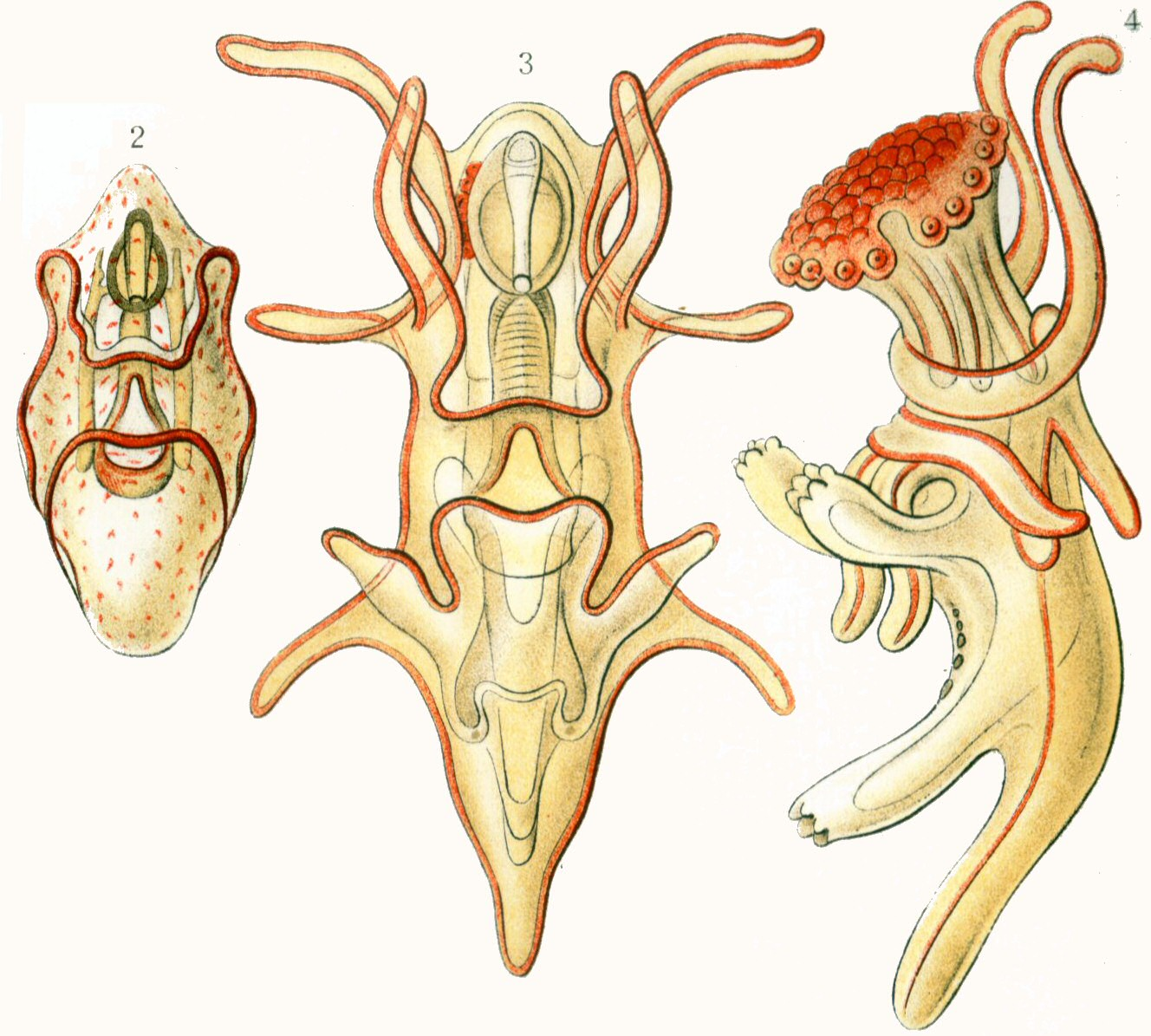
Starfish larvae are bilaterally symmetric, whereas the adults have fivefold symmetry

Echinoderms (Greek for spiny skin) is a phylum which contains only marine invertebrates. The adults are recognizable by their radial symmetry (usually five-point) and include starfish, sea urchins, sand dollars, and sea cucumbers, as well as the sea lilies. Echinoderms are found at every ocean depth, from the intertidal zone to the abyssal zone. The phylum contains about 7,000 living species, making it the second-largest grouping of deuterostomes (a superphylum), after the chordates (which include the vertebrates, such as birds, fishes, mammals, and reptiles).

Echinoderms are unique among animals in having bilateral symmetry at the larval stage, but fivefold symmetry (pentamerism, a special type of radial symmetry) as adults.

The echinoderms are important both biologically and geologically. Biologically, there are few other groupings so abundant in the biotic desert of the deep sea, as well as shallower oceans. Most echinoderms are able to regenerate tissue, organs, limbs, and reproduce asexually; in some cases, they can undergo complete regeneration from a single limb. Geologically, the value of echinoderms is in their ossified skeletons, which are major contributors to many limestone formations, and can provide valuable clues as to the geological environment. They were the most used species in regenerative research in the 19th and 20th centuries. Further, it is held by some scientists that the radiation of echinoderms was responsible for the Mesozoic Marine Revolution.

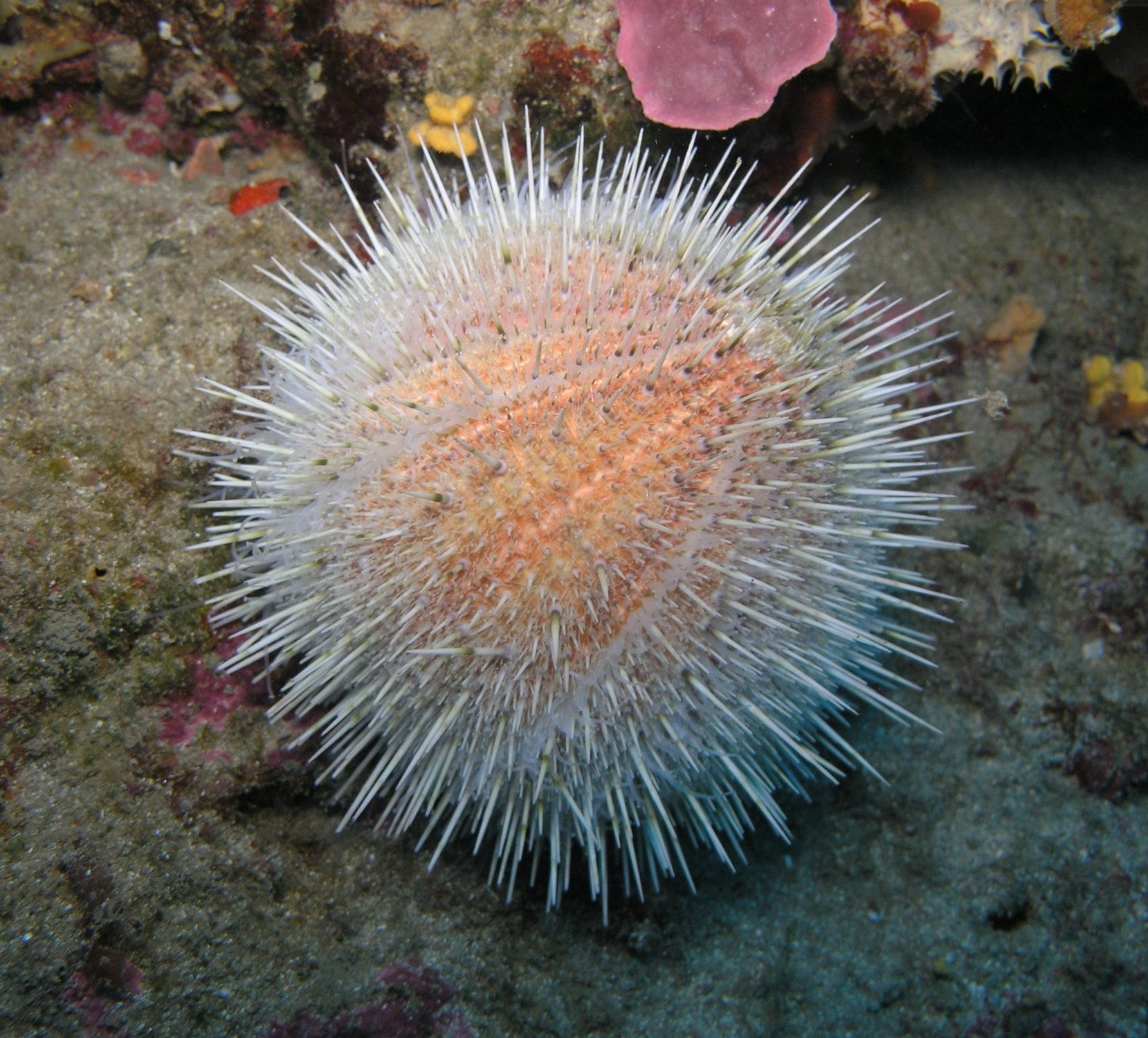
Echinoderm literally means "spiny skin", as this water melon sea urchin illustrates

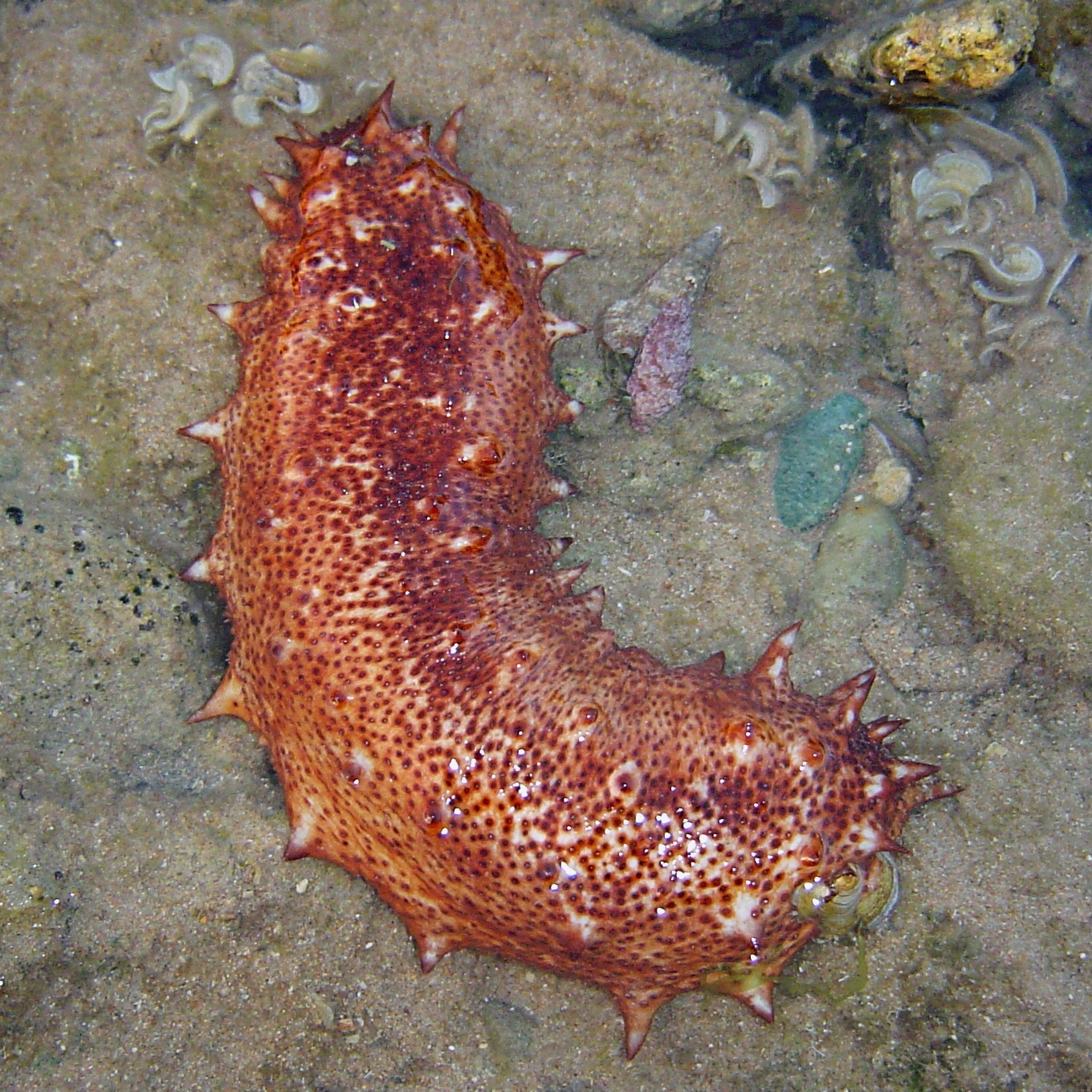
Sea cucumbers filter feed on plankton and suspended solids

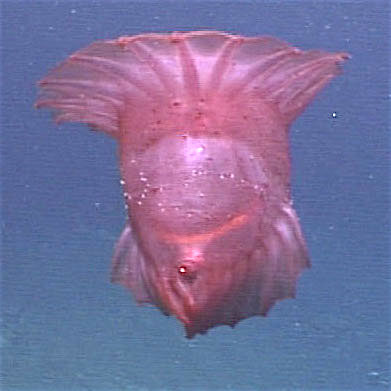
Benthopelagic sea cucumbers can lift off the seafloor and journey as much as 1,000 m (3,300 ft) up the water column

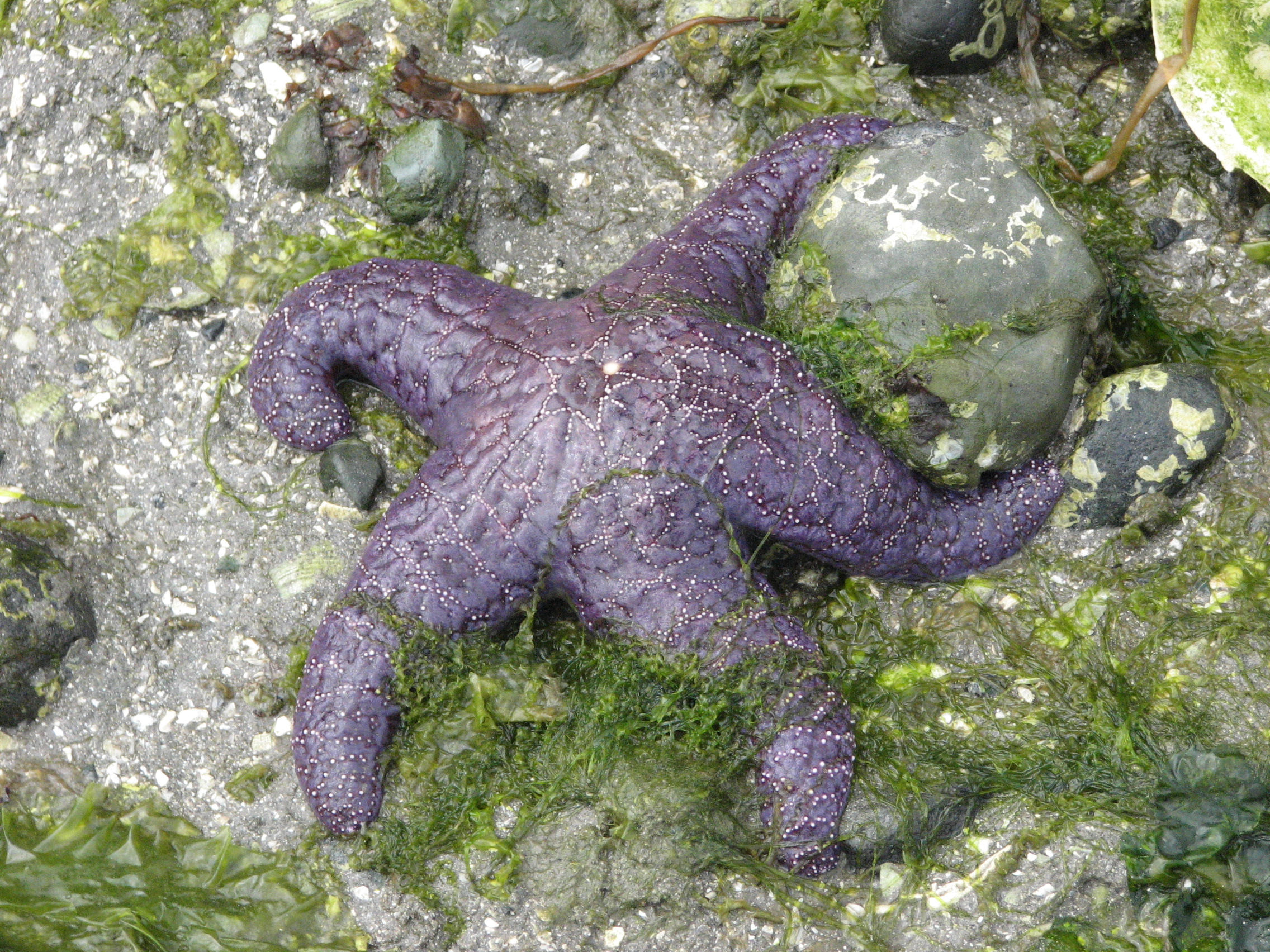
The ochre sea star was the first keystone predator to be studied. They limit mussels which can overwhelm intertidal communities.

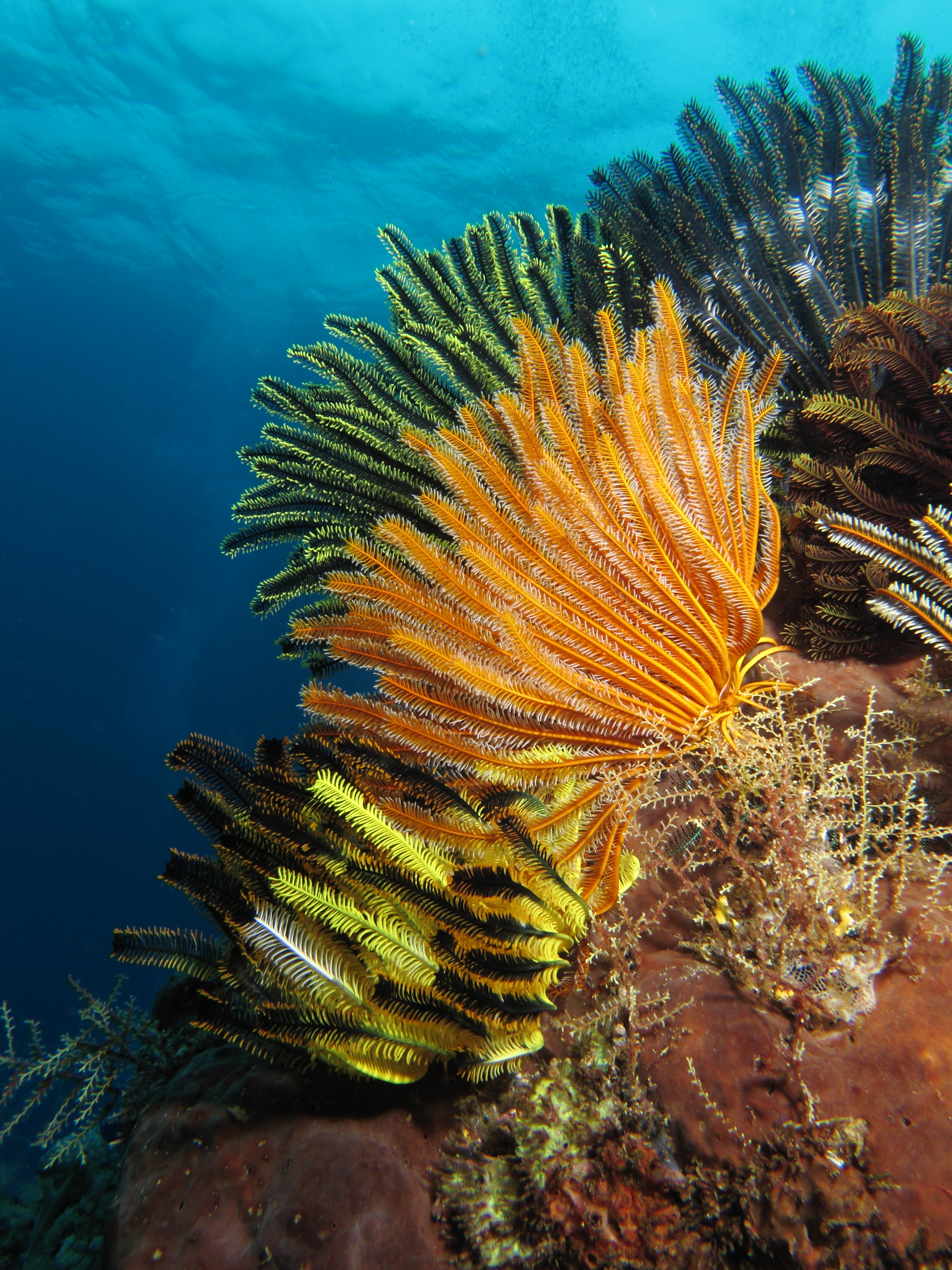
Colorful sea lilies in shallow waters

Aside from the hard-to-classify Arkarua (a Precambrian animal with echinoderm-like pentamerous radial symmetry), the first definitive members of the phylum appeared near the start of the Cambrian.

== Marine molluscs ==
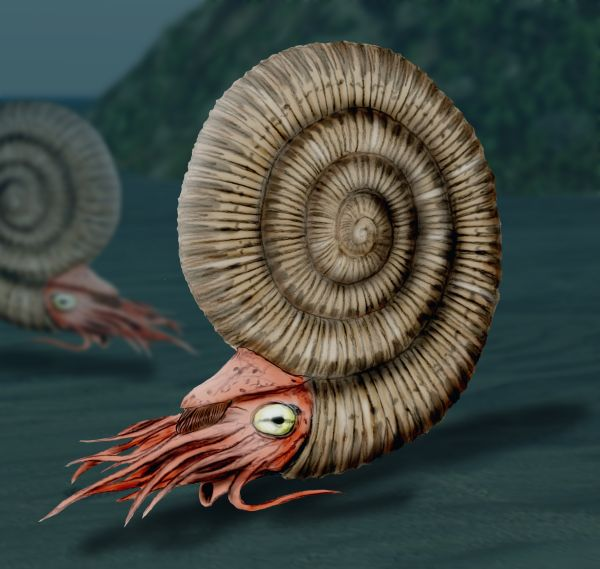
Reconstruction of an ammonite, a highly successful early cephalopod that first appeared in the Devonian (about 400 mya). They became extinct during the same extinction event that killed the land dinosaurs (about 66 mya).

Molluscs (Latin for soft) form a phylum with about 85,000 extant recognized species. By species count they are the largest marine phylum, comprising about 23% of all the named marine organisms. Molluscs have more varied forms than other invertebrate phyla. They are highly diverse, not just in size and in anatomical structure, but also in behaviour and in habitat. The majority of species still live in the oceans, from the seashores to the abyssal zone, but some form a significant part of the freshwater fauna and the terrestrial ecosystems.

The mollusc phylum is divided into nine or ten taxonomic classes, two of which are extinct. These classes include gastropods, bivalves and cephalopods, as well as other lesser-known but distinctive classes. Gastropods with protective shells are referred to as snails (sea snails), whereas gastropods without protective shells are referred to as slugs (sea slugs). Gastropods are by far the most numerous molluscs in terms of classified species, accounting for 80% of the total. Bivalves include clams, oysters, cockles, mussels, scallops, and numerous other families. There are about 8,000 marine bivalves species (including brackish water and estuarine species), and about 1,200 freshwater species. Cephalopod include octopus, squid and cuttlefish. They are found in all oceans, and neurologically are the most advanced of the invertebrates. About 800 living species of marine cephalopods have been identified, and an estimated 11,000 extinct taxa have been described. There are no fully freshwater cephalopods.

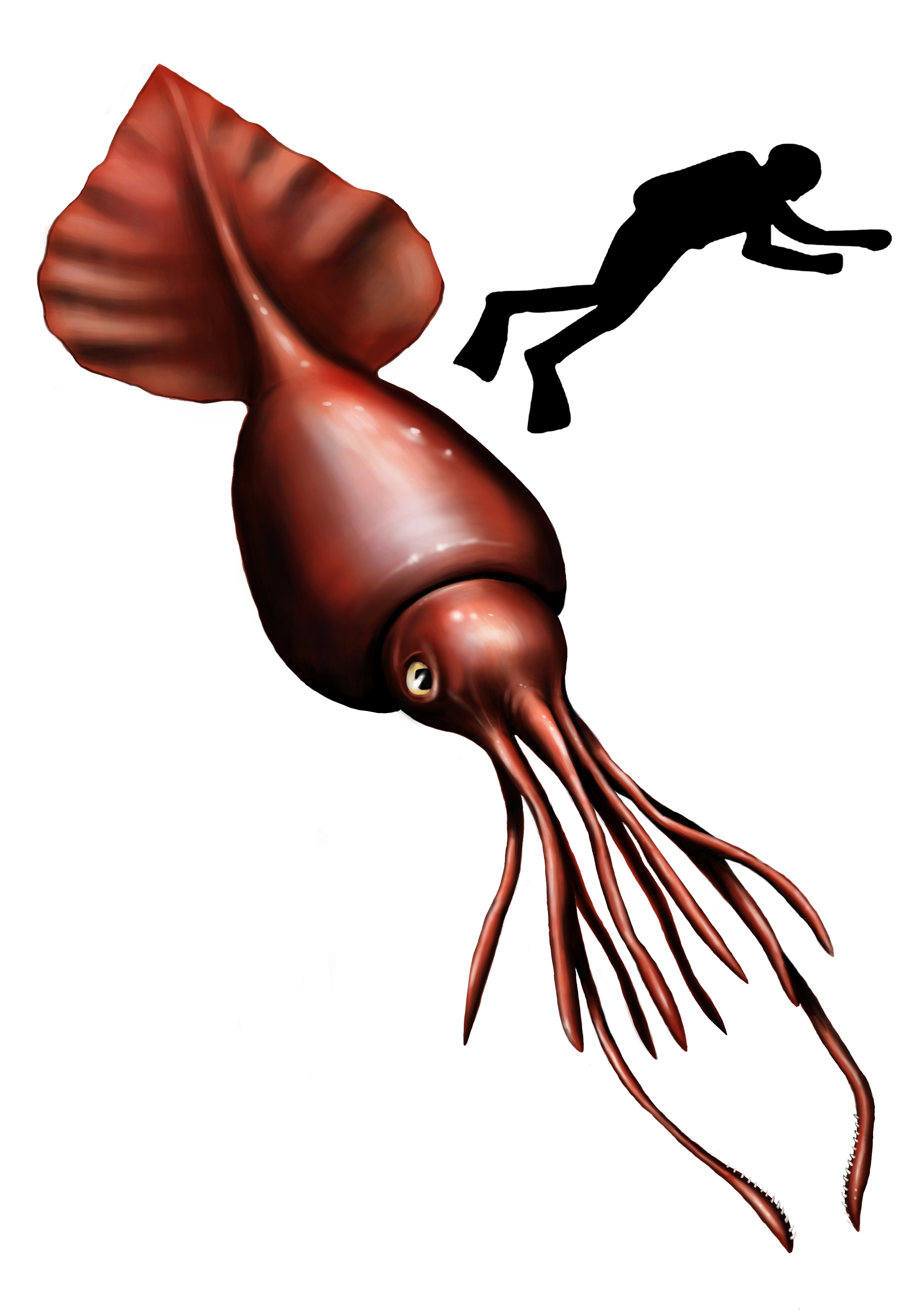
Colossal squid, largest of all invertebrates

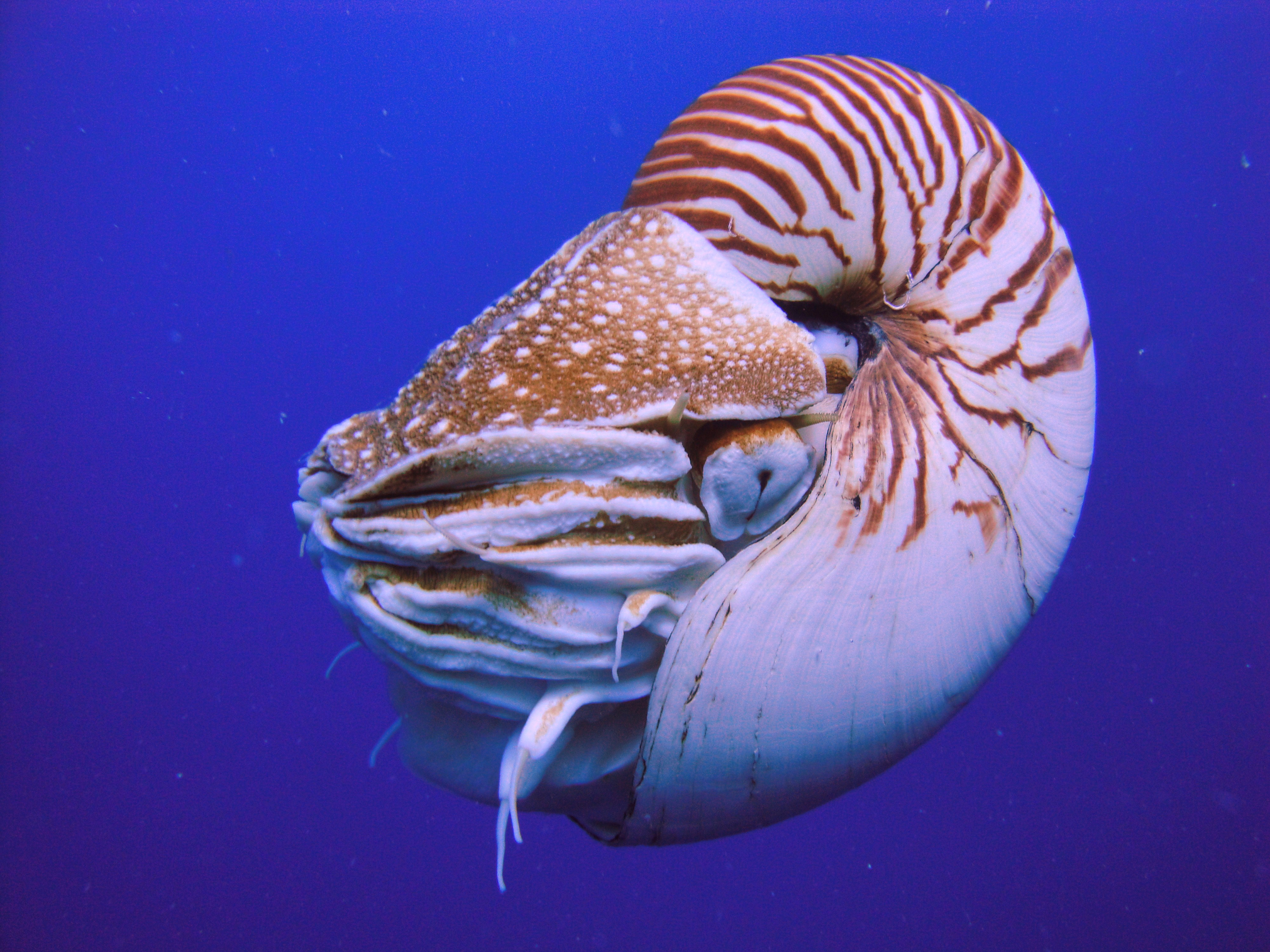
The nautilus is a living fossil little changed since it evolved 500 million years ago as one of the first cephalopods.

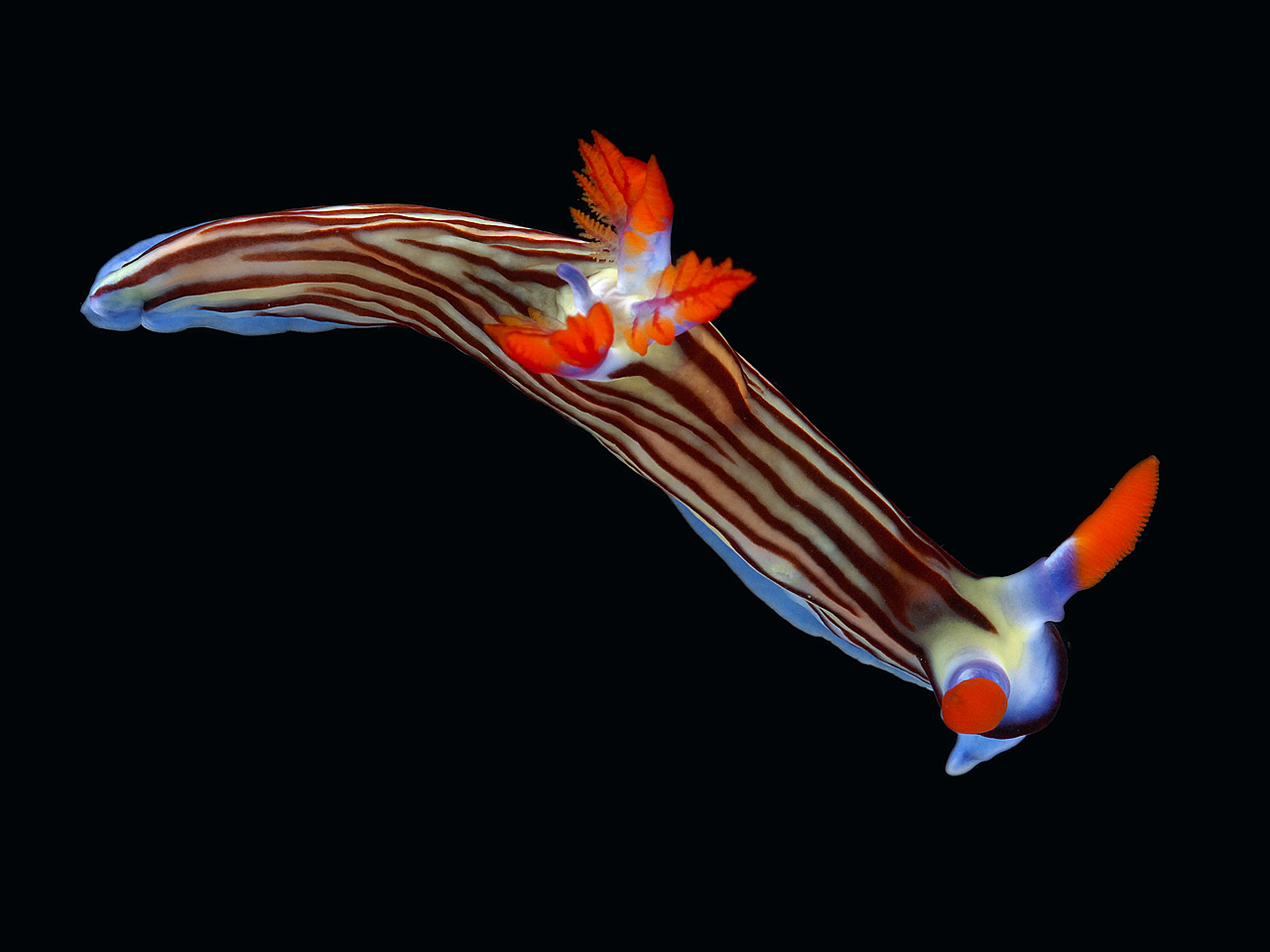
Marine gastropods are sea snails or sea slugs. This nudibranch is a sea slug.

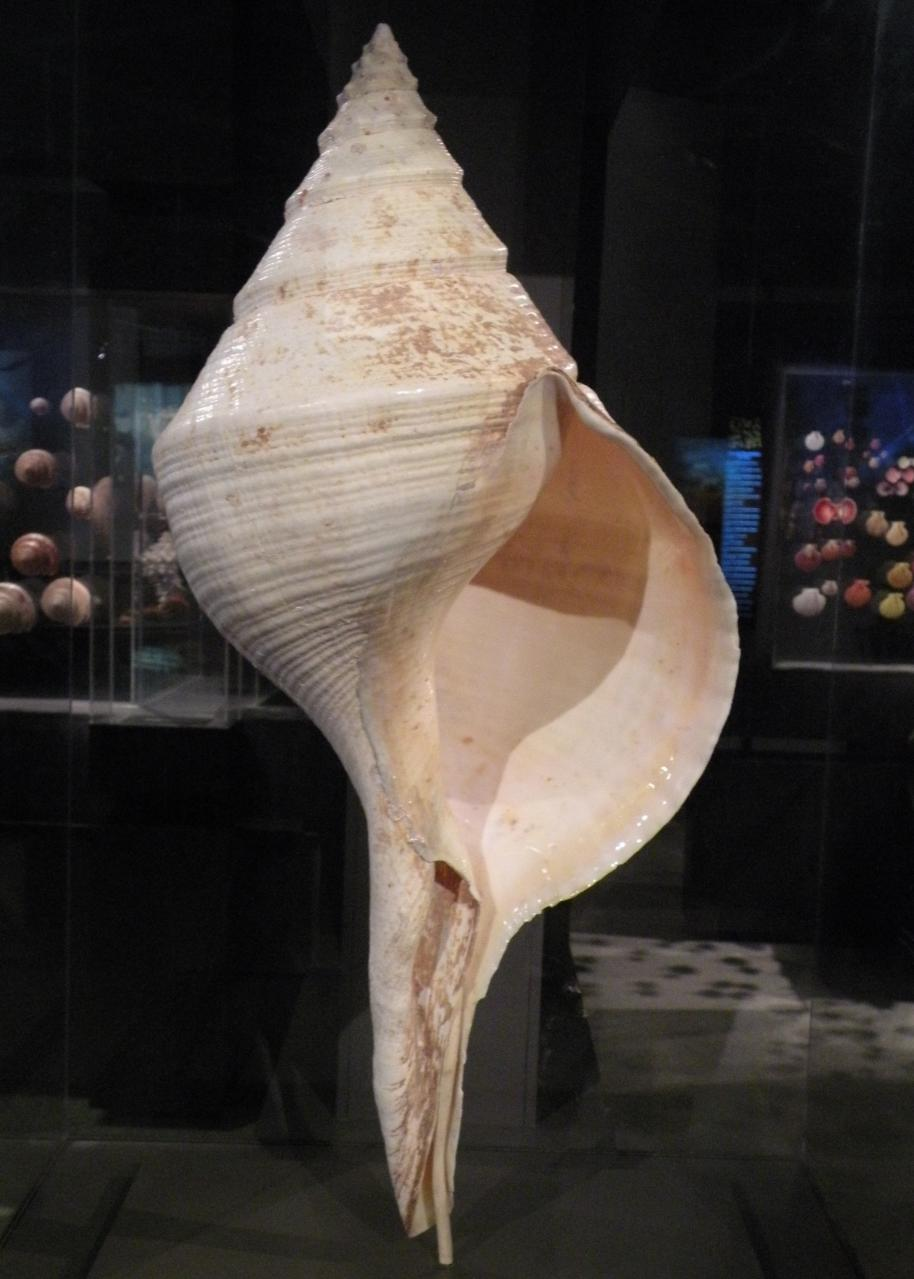
The sea snail Syrinx aruanus has the largest shell of any living gastropod

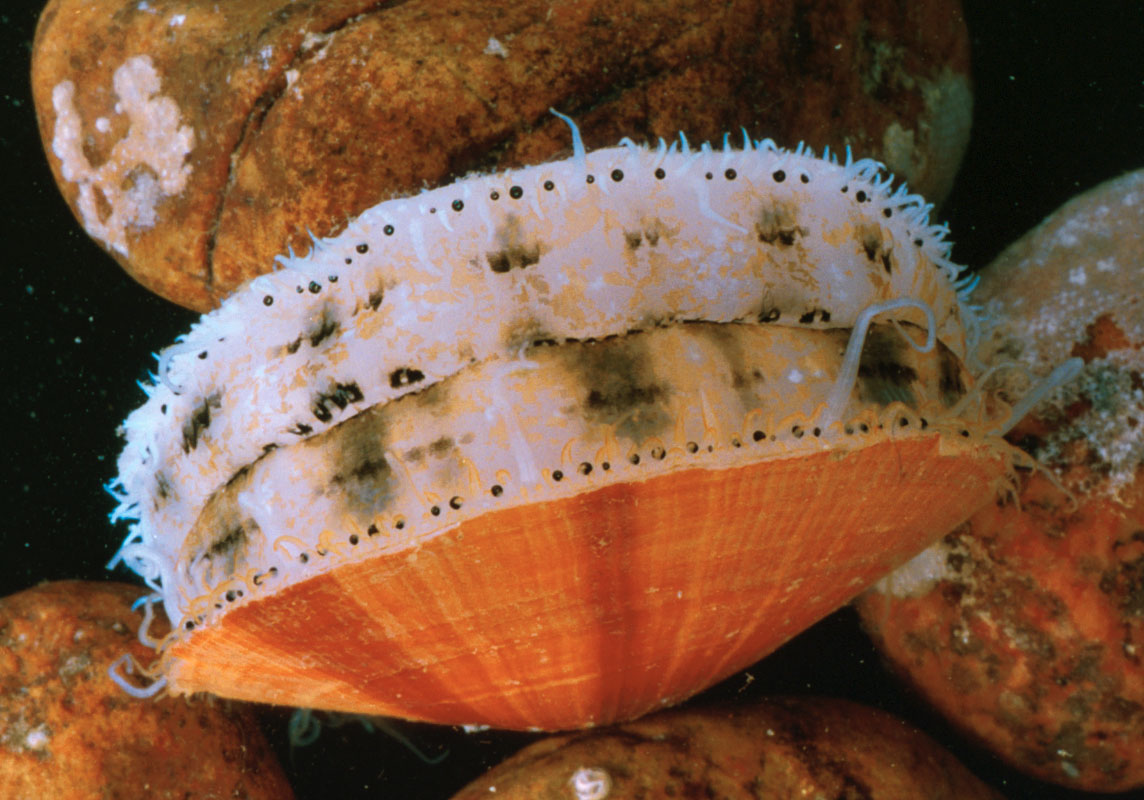
Molluscs usually have eyes. Bordering the edge of the mantle of a scallop, a bivalve mollusc, can be over 100 simple eyes.

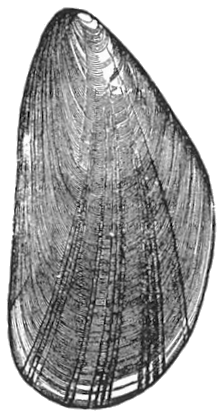
Common mussel, another bivalve

Generalized or hypothetical ancestral mollusc

Molluscs have such diverse shapes that many textbooks base their descriptions of molluscan anatomy on a generalized or hypothetical ancestral mollusc. This generalized mollusc is unsegmented and bilaterally symmetrical with an underside consisting of a single muscular foot. Beyond that it has three further key features. Firstly, it has a muscular cloak called a mantle covering its viscera and containing a significant cavity used for breathing and excretion. A shell secreted by the mantle covers the upper surface. Secondly (apart from bivalves) it has a rasping tongue called a radula used for feeding. Thirdly, it has a nervous system including a complex digestive system using microscopic, muscle-powered hairs called cilia to exude mucus. The generalized mollusc has two paired nerve cords (three in bivalves). The brain, in species that have one, encircles the esophagus. Most molluscs have eyes and all have sensors detecting chemicals, vibrations, and touch. The simplest type of molluscan reproductive system relies on external fertilization, but more complex variations occur. All produce eggs, from which may emerge trochophore larvae, more complex veliger larvae, or miniature adults. The depiction is rather similar to modern monoplacophorans, and some suggest it may resemble very early molluscs.

Good evidence exists for the appearance of marine gastropods, cephalopods and bivalves in the Cambrian period 538.8 to 486.85 million years ago. However, the evolutionary history both of molluscs' emergence from the ancestral Lophotrochozoa and of their diversification into the well-known living and fossil forms are still subjects of vigorous debate among scientists.

== Marine arthropods ==
Segmentation and tagmata of an arthropod

Arthropods (Greek for jointed feet) have an exoskeleton (external skeleton), a segmented body, and jointed appendages (paired appendages). They form a phylum which includes insects, arachnids, myriapods, and crustaceans. Arthropods are characterized by their jointed limbs and cuticle made of chitin, often mineralised with calcium carbonate. The arthropod body plan consists of segments, each with a pair of appendages. The rigid cuticle inhibits growth, so arthropods replace it periodically by moulting. Their versatility has enabled them to become the most species-rich members of all ecological guilds in most environments.

Marine arthropods range in size from the microscopic crustacean Stygotantulus to the Japanese spider crab. Arthropods' primary internal cavity is a hemocoel, which accommodates their internal organs, and through which their haemolymph - analogue of blood - circulates; they have open circulatory systems. Like their exteriors, the internal organs of arthropods are generally built of repeated segments. Their nervous system is "ladder-like", with paired ventral nerve cords running through all segments and forming paired ganglia in each segment. Their heads are formed by fusion of varying numbers of segments, and their brains are formed by fusion of the ganglia of these segments and encircle the esophagus. The respiratory and excretory systems of arthropods vary, depending as much on their environment as on the subphylum to which they belong.

Their vision relies on various combinations of compound eyes and pigment-pit ocelli: in most species the ocelli can only detect the direction from which light is coming, and the compound eyes are the main source of information, but the main eyes of spiders are ocelli that can form images and, in a few cases, can swivel to track prey. Arthropods also have a wide range of chemical and mechanical sensors, mostly based on modifications of the many setae (bristles) that project through their cuticles. Arthropods' methods of reproduction and development are diverse; all terrestrial species use internal fertilization, but this is often by indirect transfer of the sperm via an appendage or the ground, rather than by direct injection. Marine species all lay eggs and use either internal or external fertilization. Arthropod hatchlings vary from miniature adults to grubs that lack jointed limbs and eventually undergo a total metamorphosis to produce the adult form.

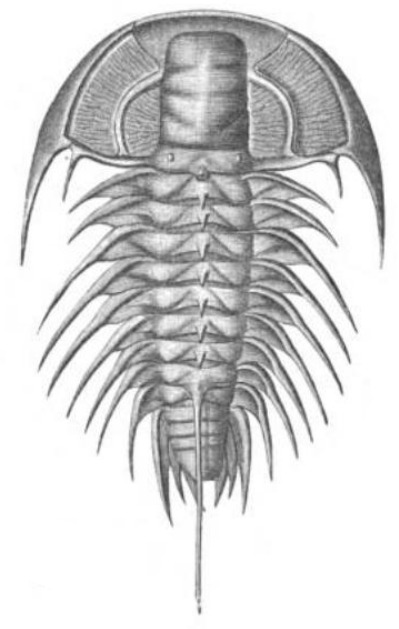
Trilobites, now extinct, roamed oceans for 270 million years.

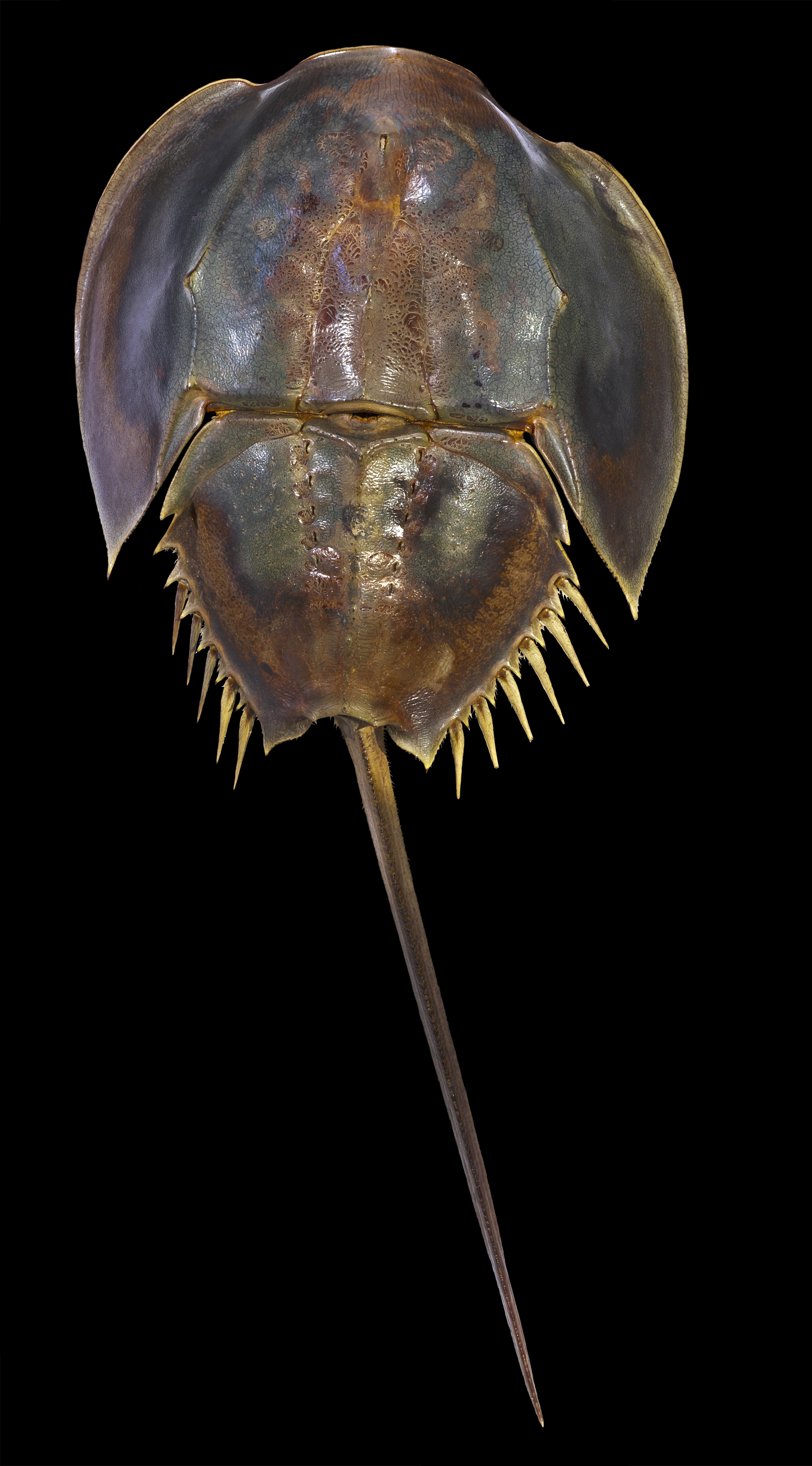
Horseshoe crab, a living fossil arthropod from 450 million years ago
Crustaceans

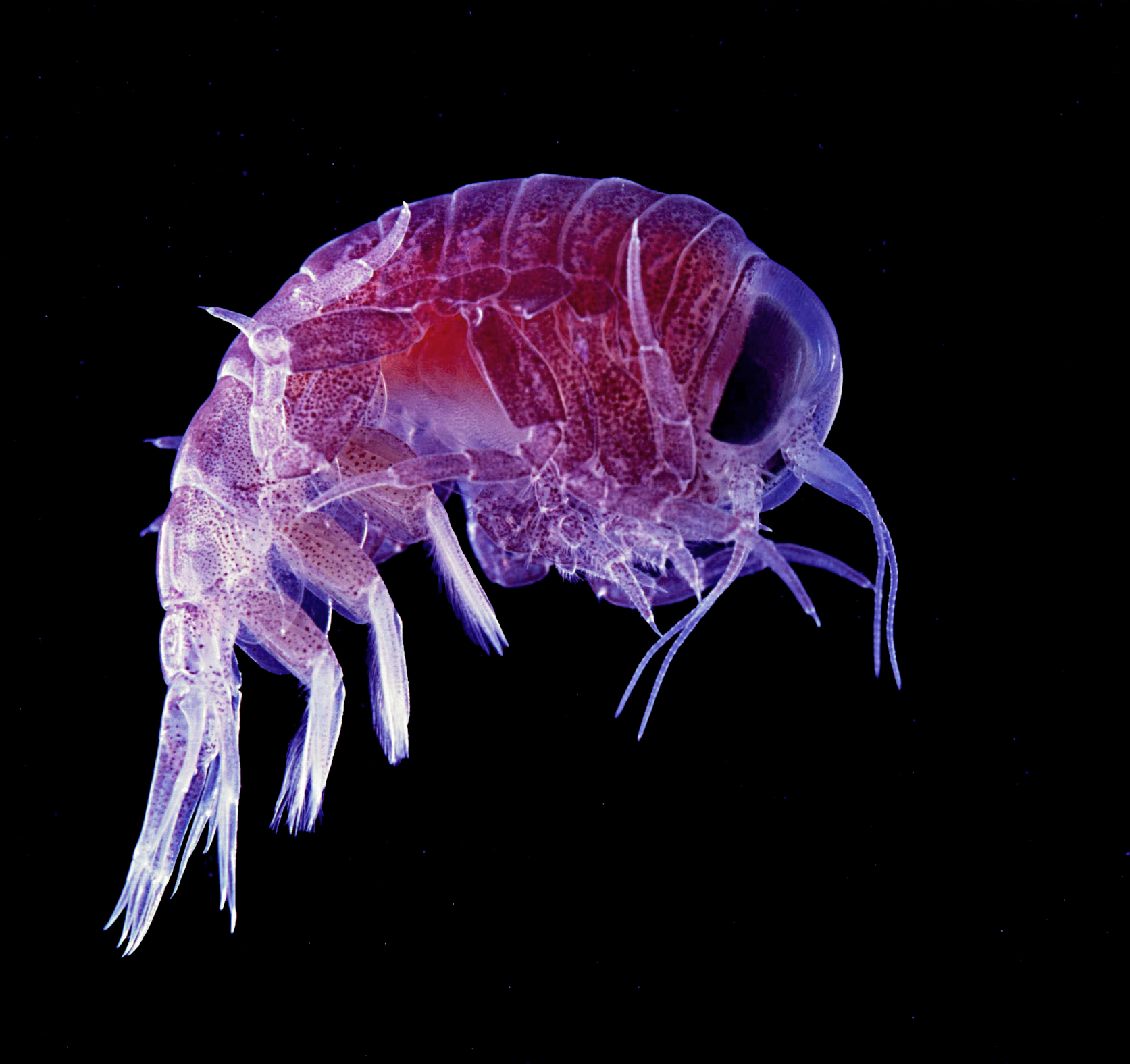
Many crustaceans are very small, like this tiny amphipod, and make up a significant part of the ocean's zooplankton

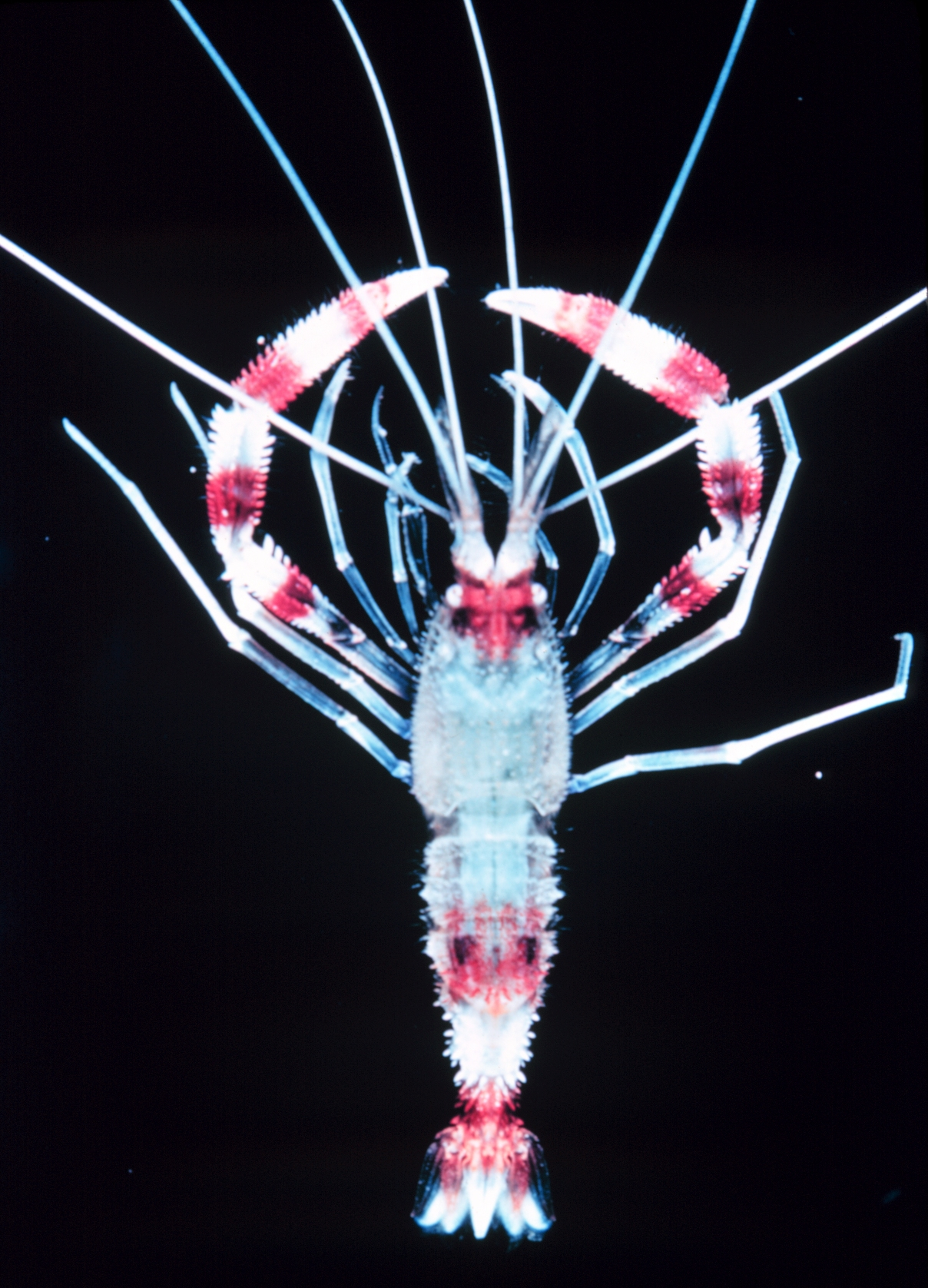
The banded cleaner shrimp is a crustacean common in the tropics.

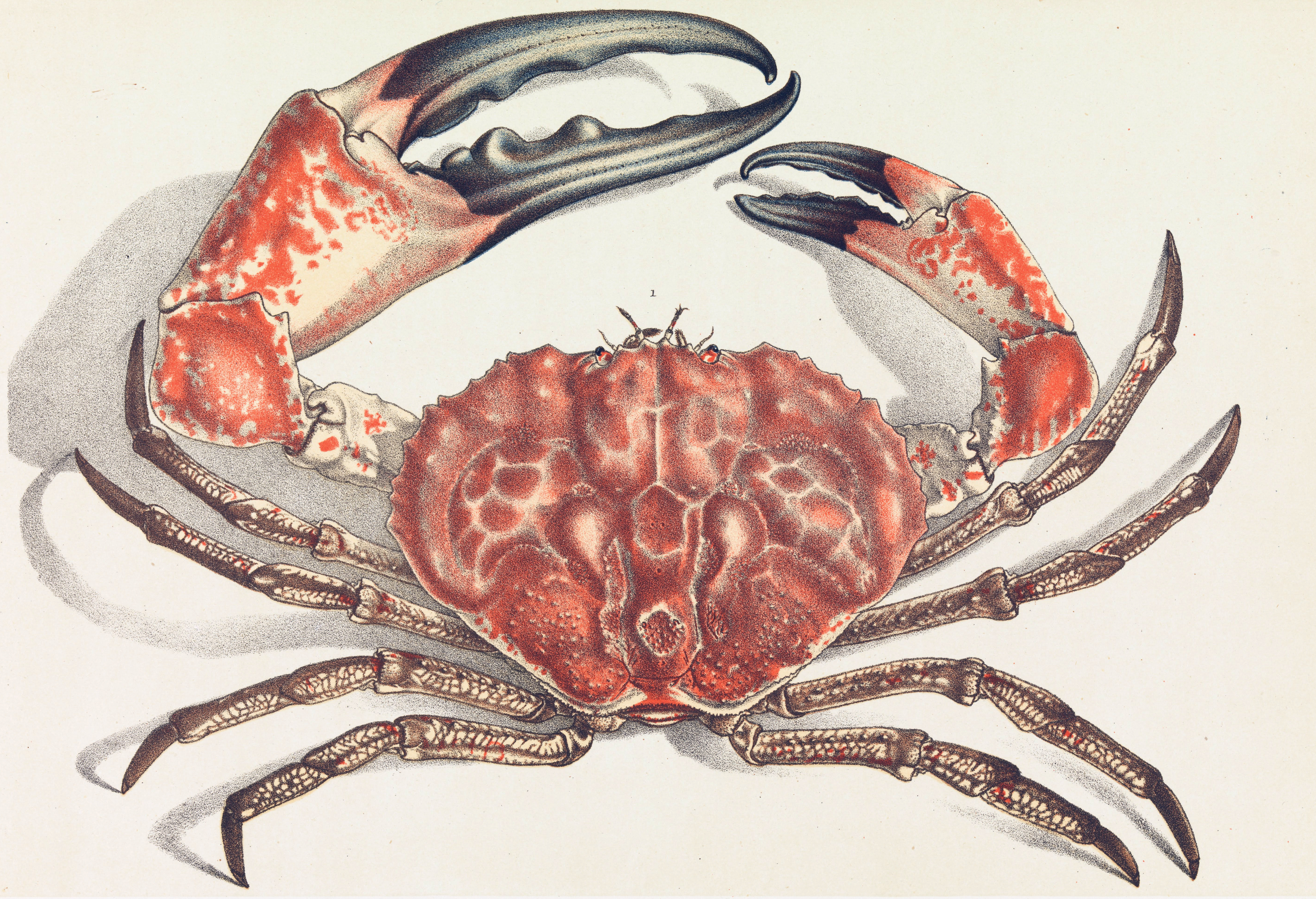
The Tasmanian giant crab is long-lived and slow-growing, making it vulnerable to overfishing.

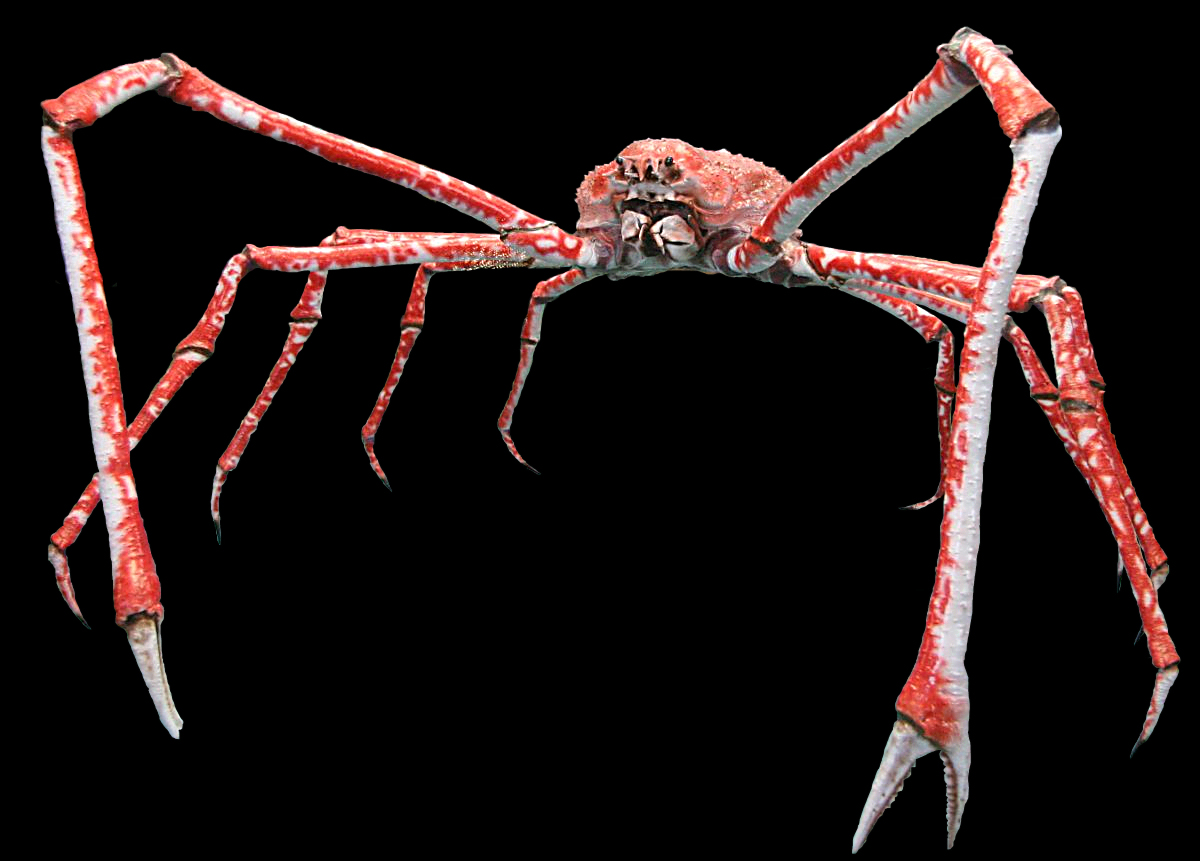
The Japanese spider crab has the longest leg span of any arthropod.

The evolutionary ancestry of arthropods dates back to the Cambrian Period. The group is generally regarded as monophyletic, and many analyses support the placement of arthropods with cycloneuralians (or their constituent clades) in a superphylum Ecdysozoa. Overall however, the basal relationships of Metazoa are not yet well resolved. Likewise, the relationships between various arthropod groups are still actively debated.

== Other phyla ==
- Tardigrada, Lobopodia, (Onychophora)
- Non-craniate (non-vertebrate) chordates: Cephalochordata, Tunicata and Haikouella. These invertebrates are close relatives of the vertebrates.
Non-craniate chordates are close relatives of vertebrates

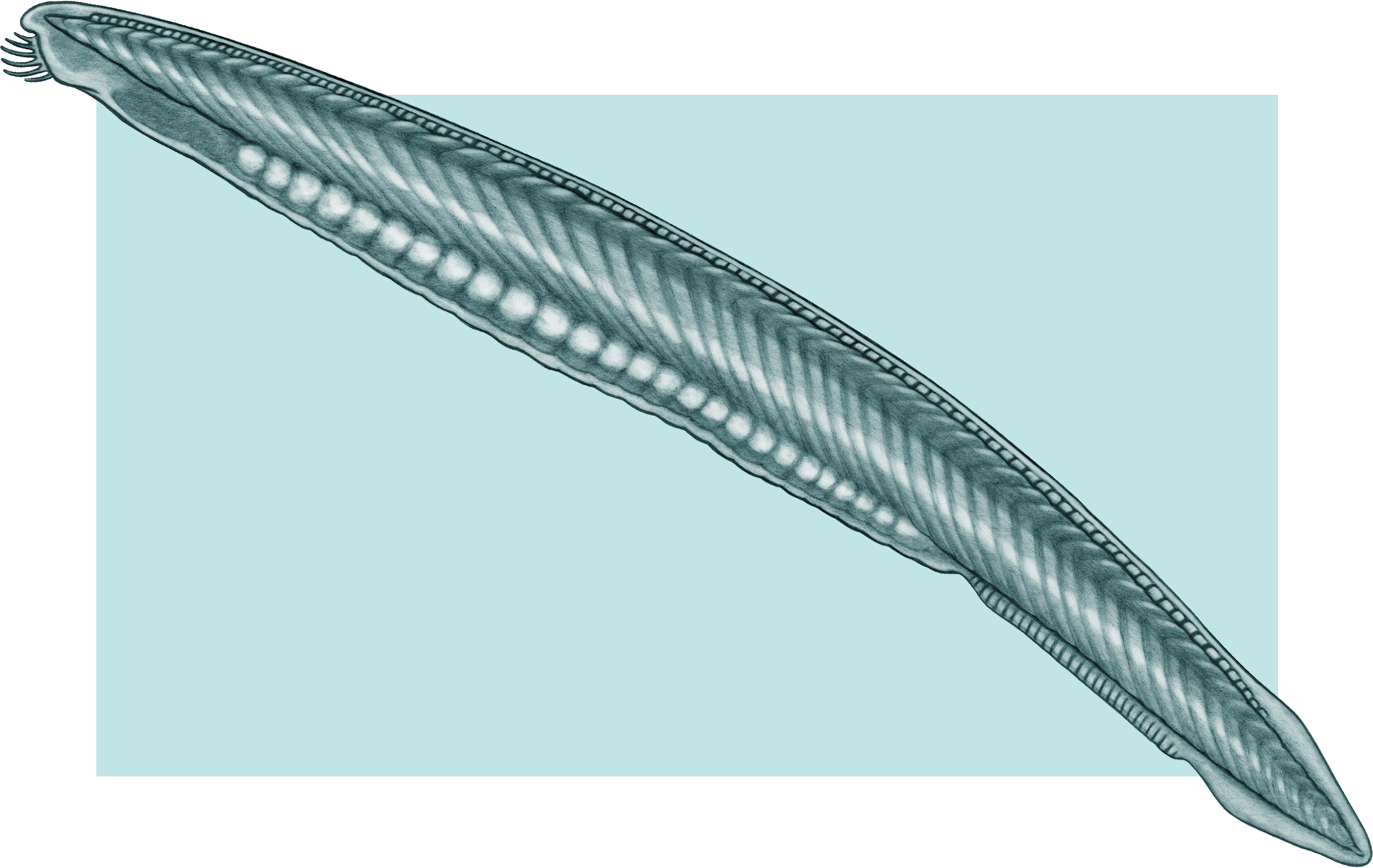
The lancelet, a small translucent fish-like Cephalochordate, is the closest living invertebrate relative of the vertebrates.

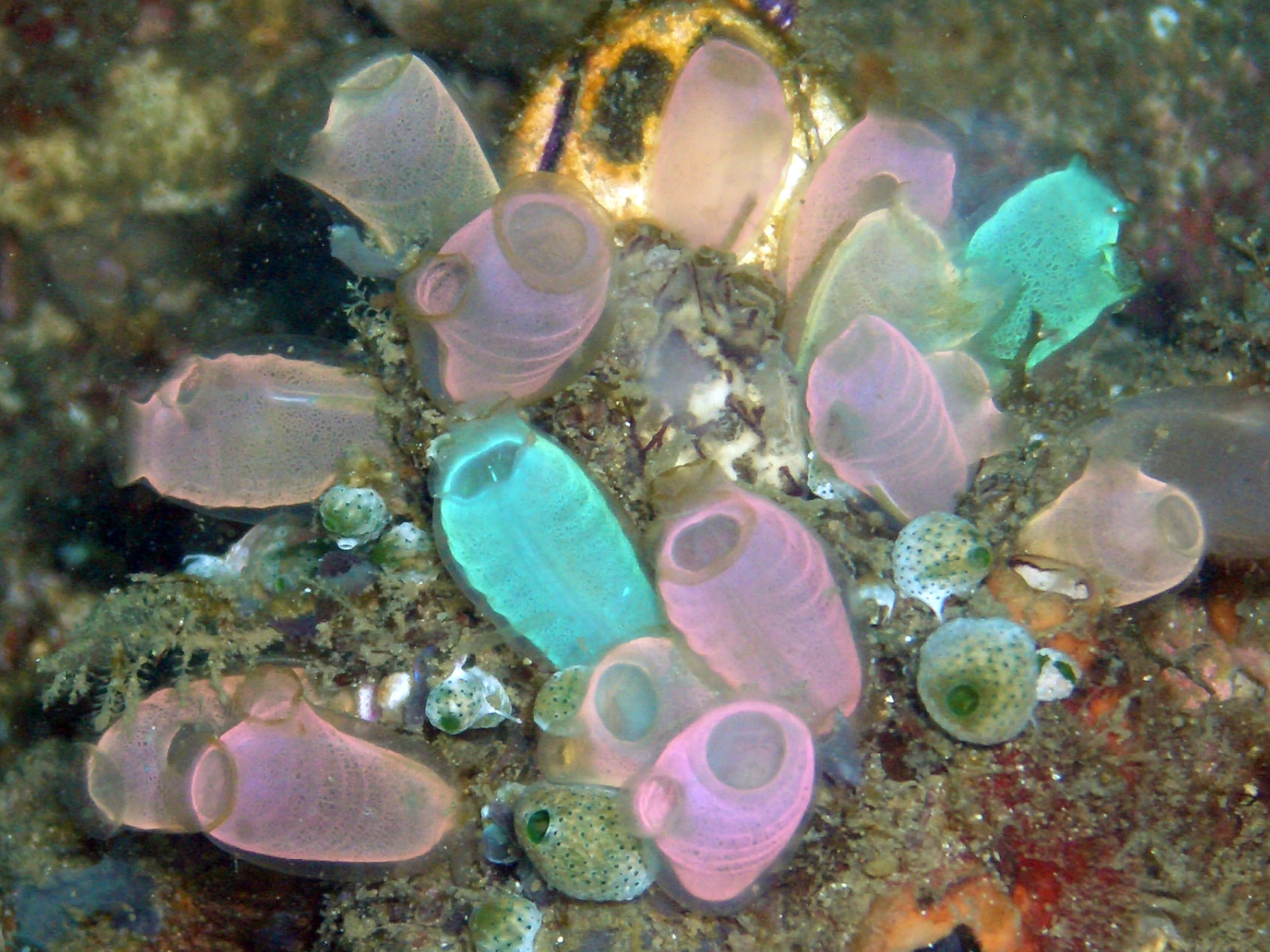
Fluorescent-colored sea squirts, Rhopalaea crassa. Tunicates may provide clues to vertebrate (and therefore human) ancestry.

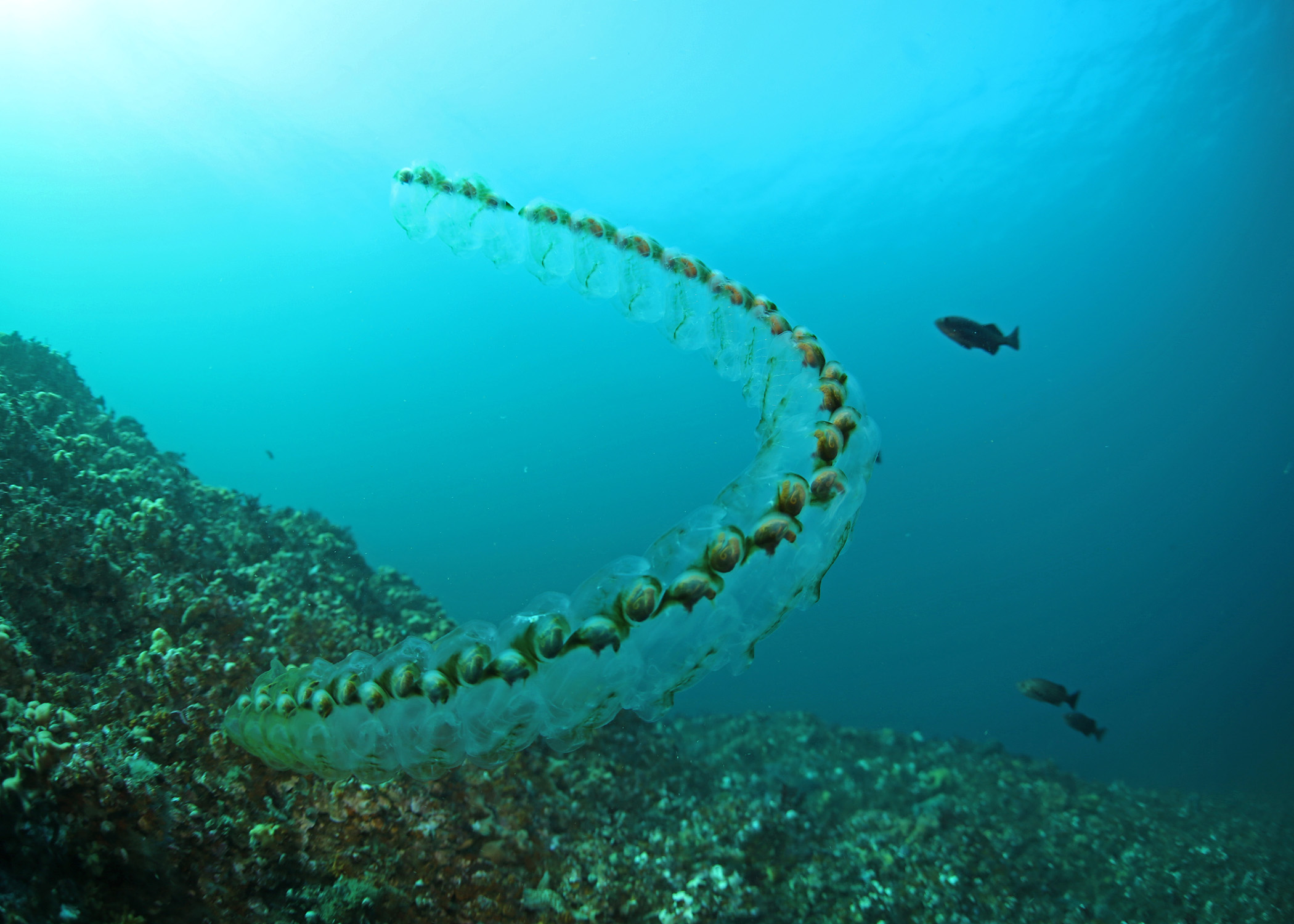
Salp chain

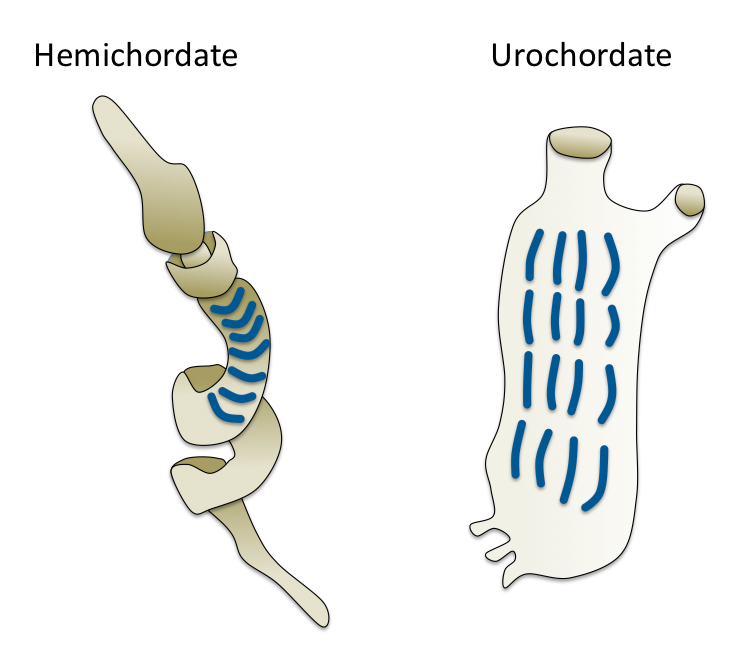
Gill slits in an acorn worm (left) and tunicate (right)

== Minerals from sea water ==
There are a number of marine invertebrates that use minerals that are present in the sea in such minute quantities that they were undetectable until the advent of spectroscopy. Vanadium is concentrated by some tunicates for use in their blood cells to a level ten million times that of the surrounding seawater. Other tunicates similarly concentrate niobium and tantalum. Lobsters use copper in their respiratory pigment hemocyanin, despite the proportion of this metal in seawater being minute. Although these elements are present in vast quantities in the ocean, their extraction by man is not economic.

== Glass models ==
Blaschka glass marine invertebrates, 1863–1880

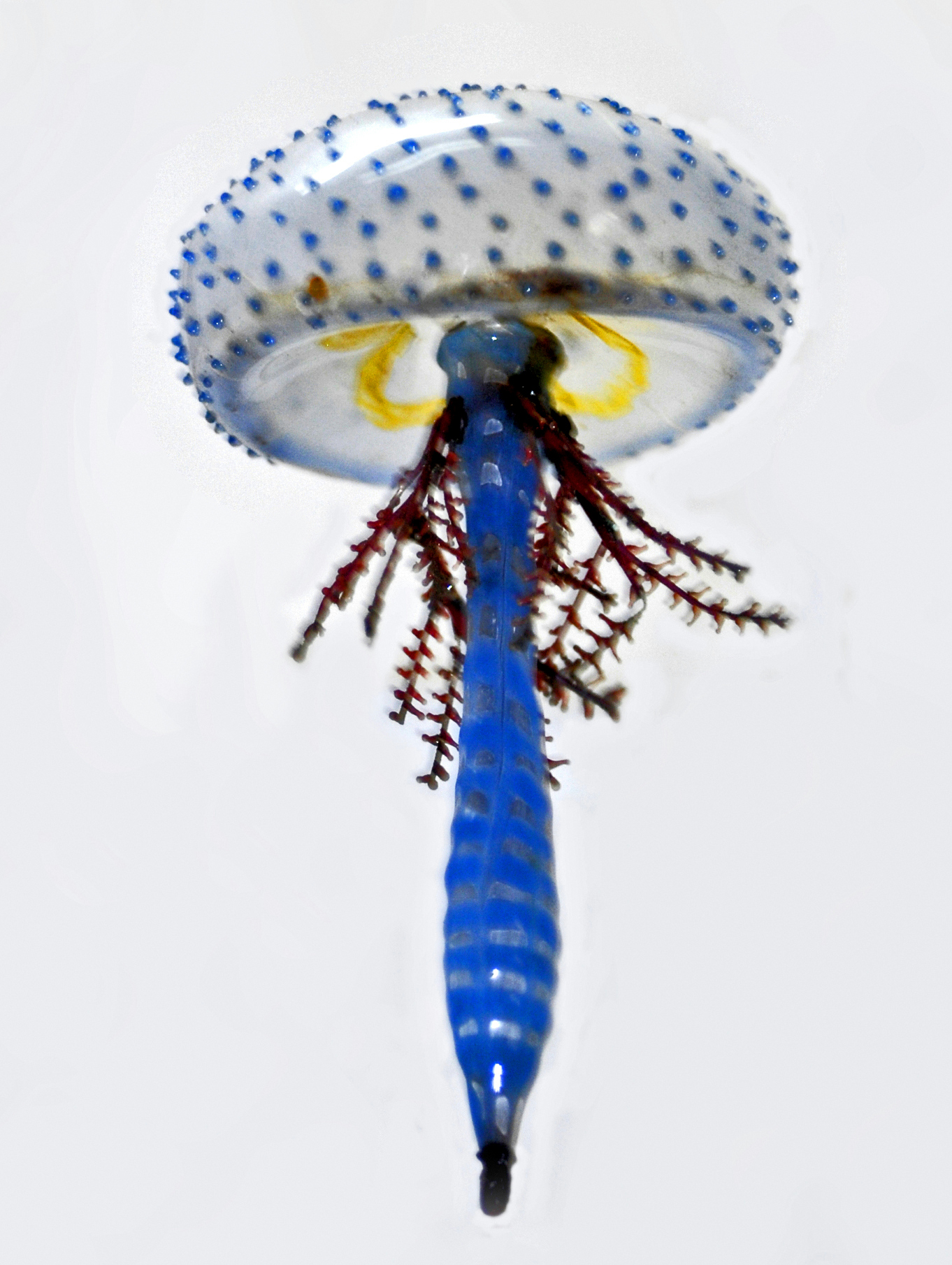

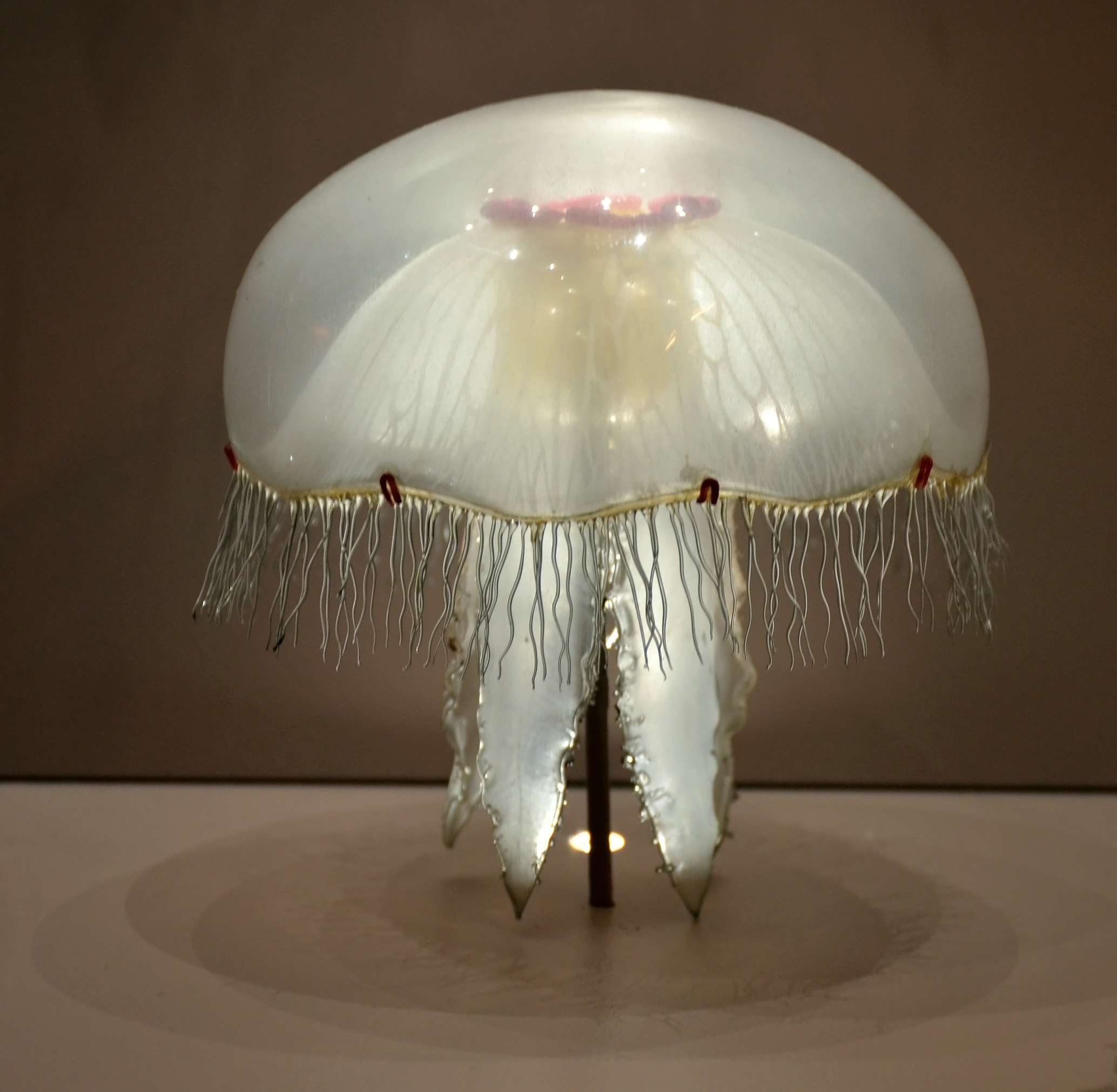
Aurelia aurita

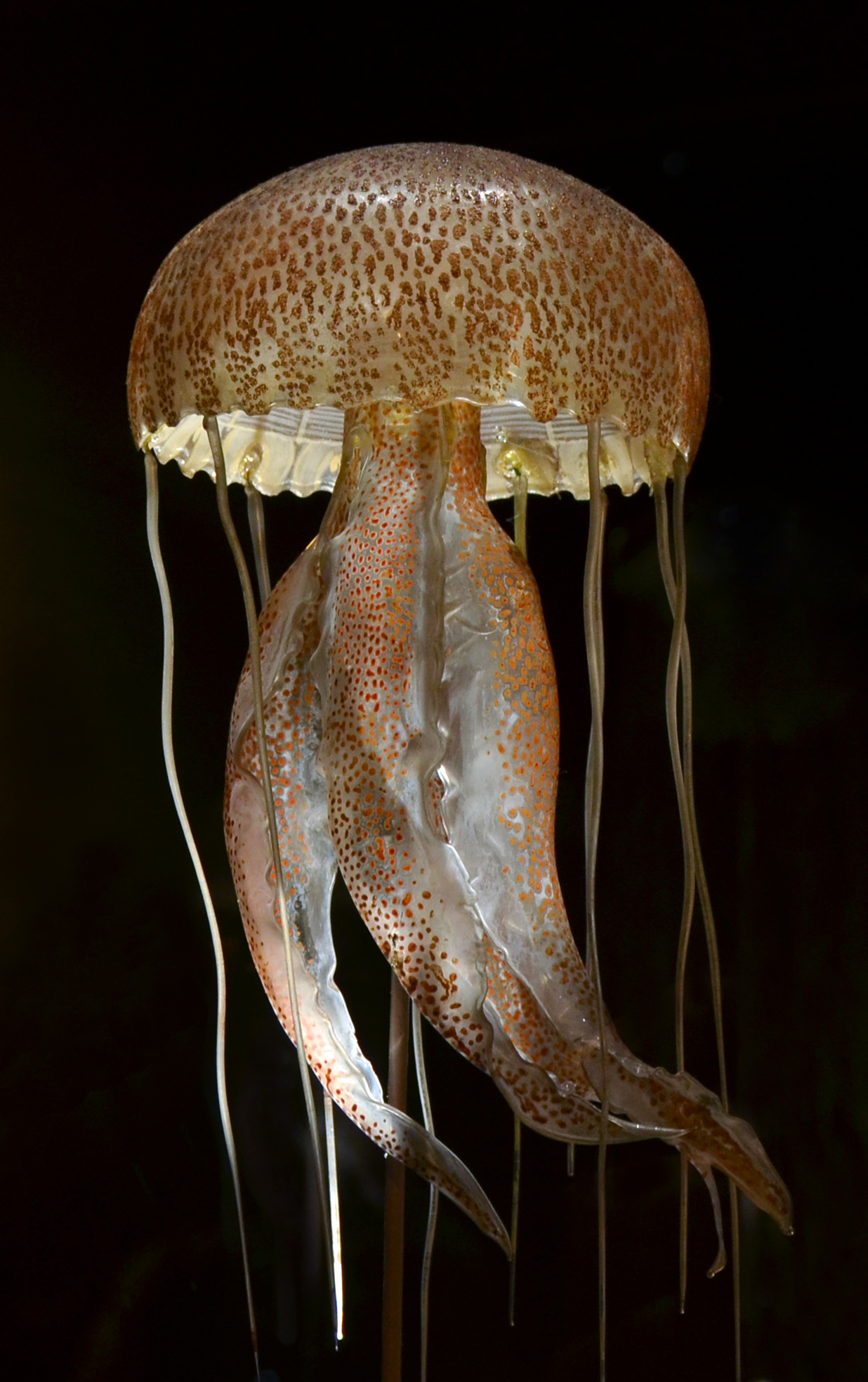
Cnidarian

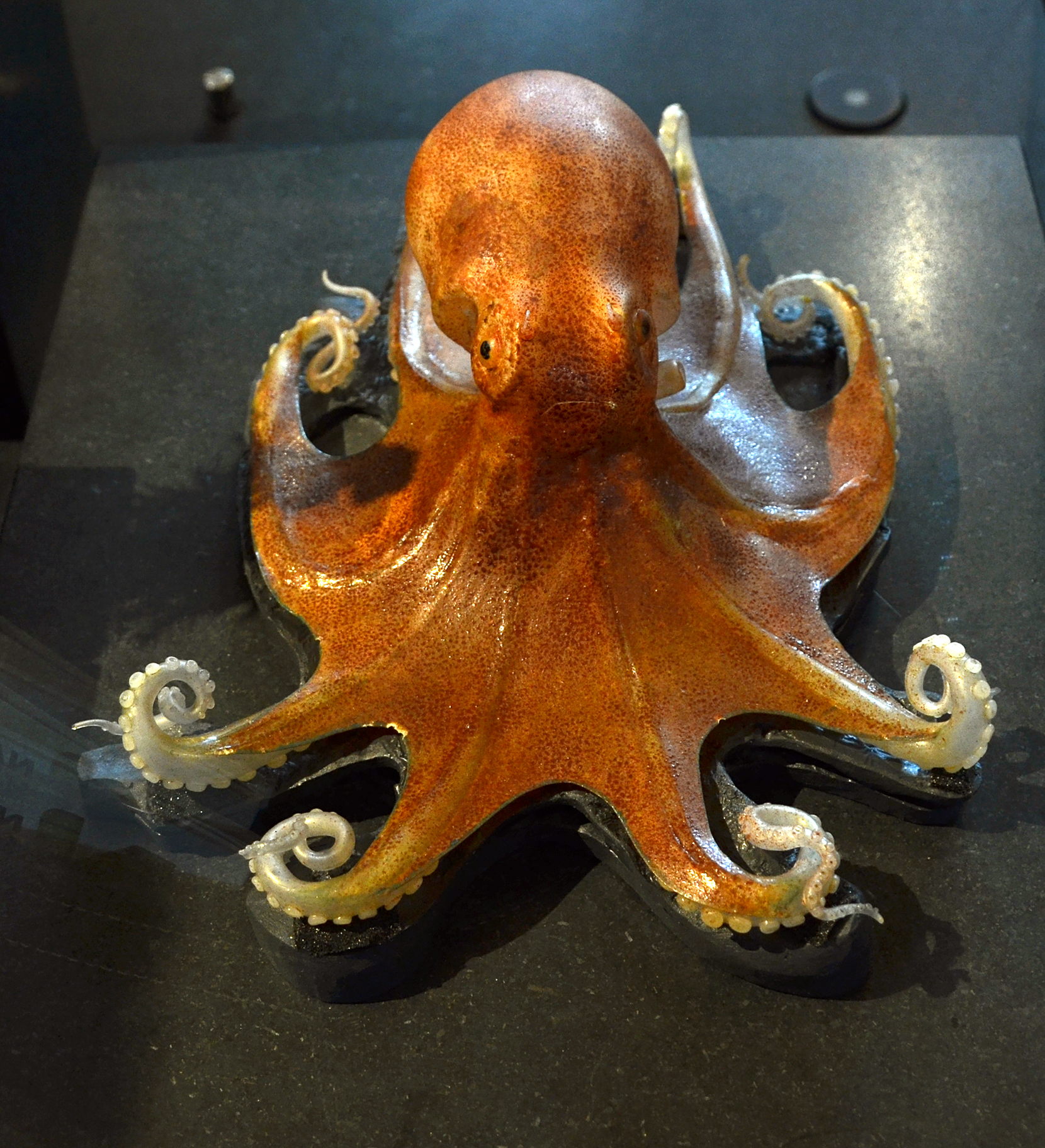
Octopus

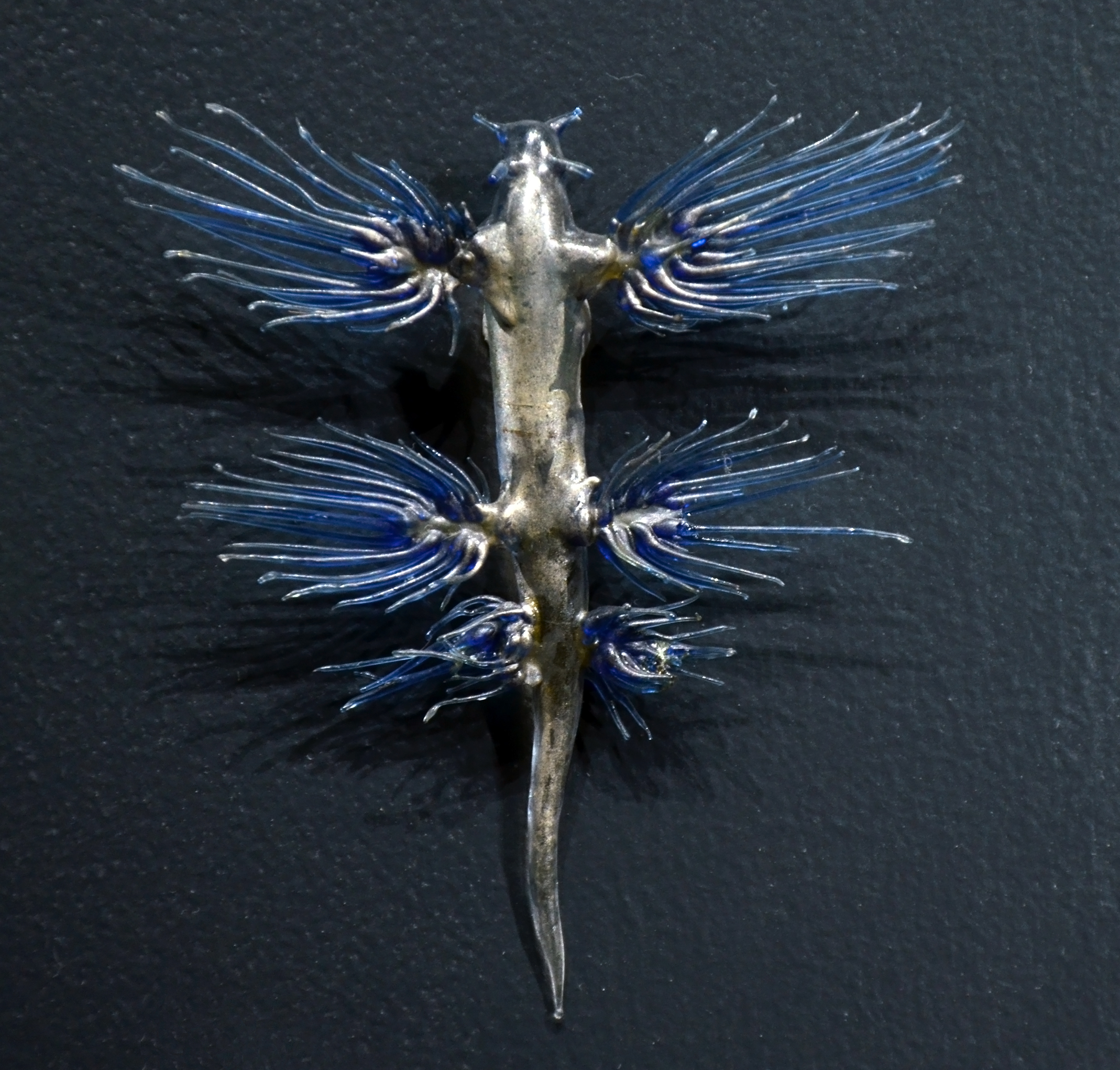
Glaucus atlanticus

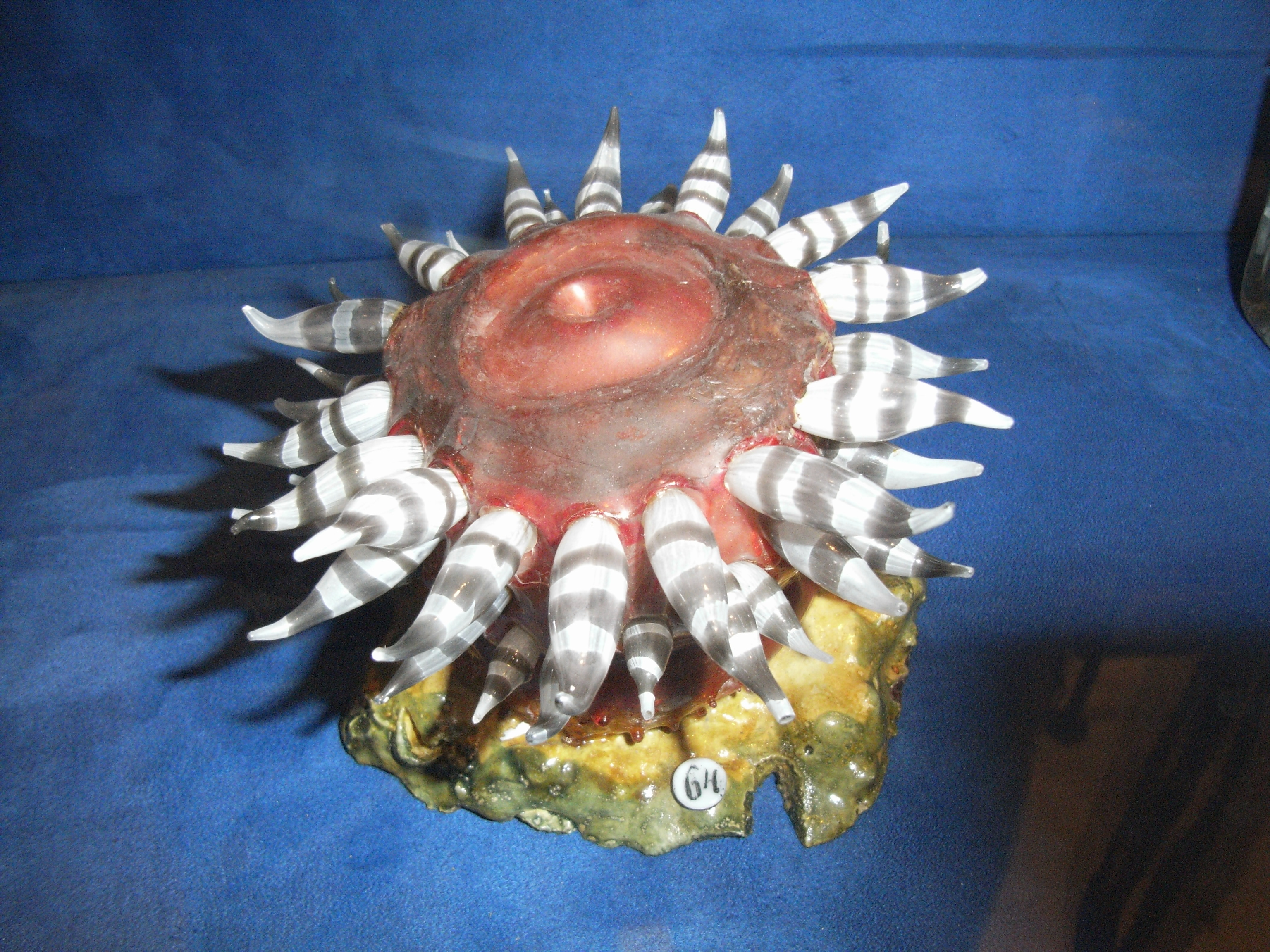
Sea anemone

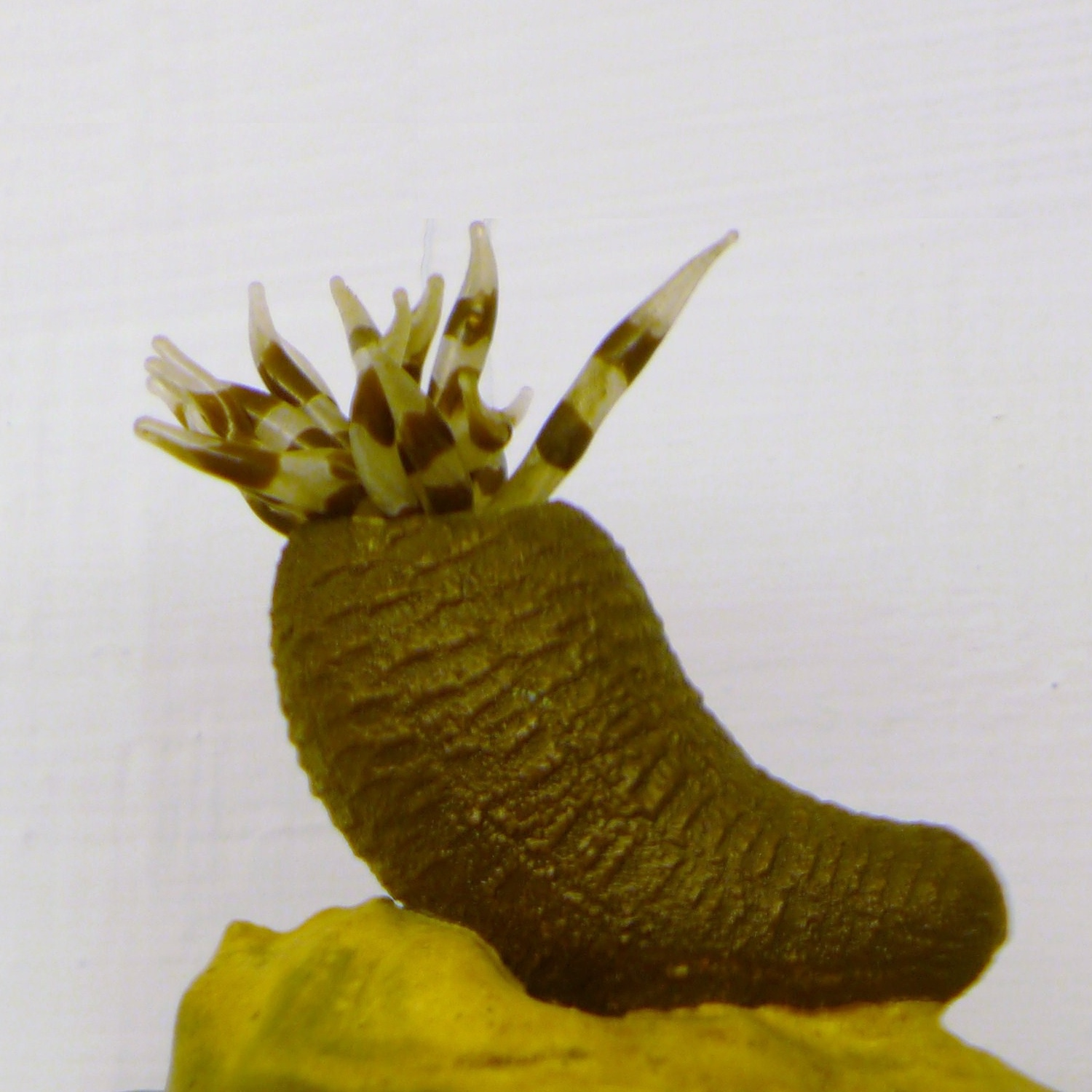

== See also ==
- Marine life
- Marine biology
- Marine vertebrate
- List of marine aquarium invertebrate species
- Wiwaxia

== Other references ==
- List of Animal Phyla
