= Halwaxiida =

Halwaxiida Temporal range: Early Cambrian–Tremadocian Possible Darriwilian record
- Halkieria sp.

Scientific classification
- Kingdom: Animalia
- Superphylum: Lophotrochozoa
- (unranked): Halwaxiida

Families
- †Halkieriidae; †Orthrozanclidae Merged with Halkieriidae by Zhao et al, †Wiwaxiidae; †Siphogonuchitidae; †"Ninellids"

Proposed clade of extinct Lophotrochozoa

Halwaxiida is a proposed clade equivalent to the older orders Sachitida He 1980 and Thambetolepidea Jell 1981, loosely uniting scale-bearing Cambrian animals, which may lie in the stem group to molluscs or lophotrochozoa. Some palaeontologists question the validity of the Halwaxiida clade.

Members of this clade are known as halwaxiids.

== Definition and members ==
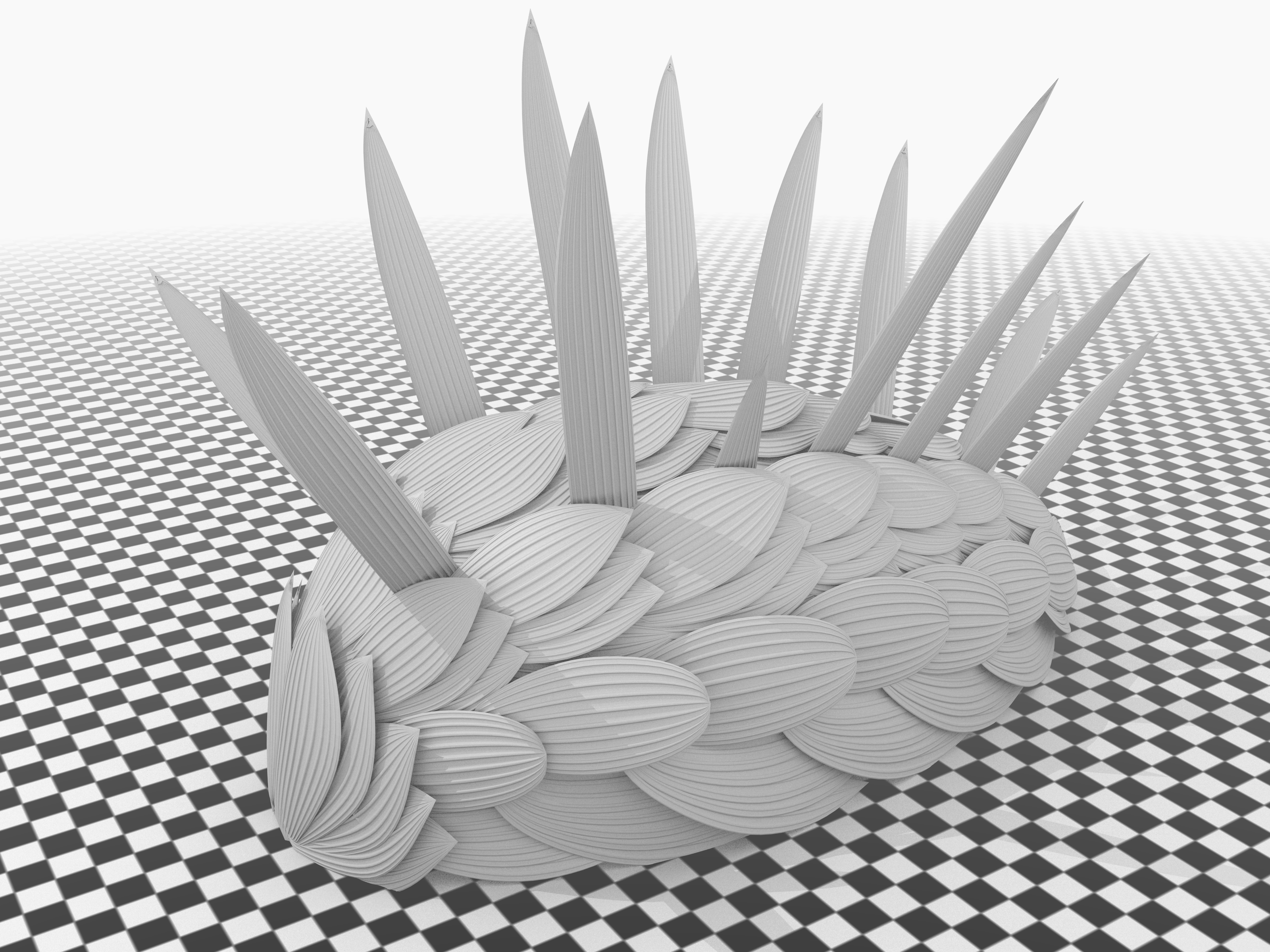
A reconstruction of Wiwaxia

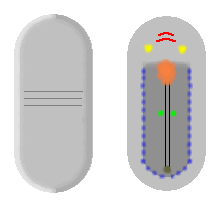
Diagrammatic reconstruction of top and underside of Odontogriphus

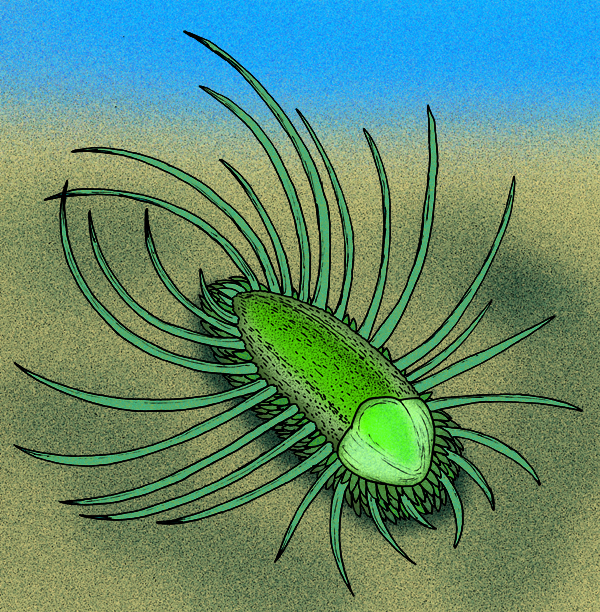
Artist's impression of Orthrozanclus

Halkieria sclerite zones

The name "halwaxiid" was formed by combining the names of two members of the proposed group, Halkieria and Wiwaxia. The group was defined as a set of Early to Mid Cambrian animals that had: a "chain mail" coat of three concentric bands of small armor plates that are called sclerites; in some cases, a small cap-like shell at the front end and in some cases both ends. Some scientists are unhappy with this loose definition, arguing that such traits may have arisen convergently rather than being inherited from a common ancestor. This objection implies that the group may not be monophyletic, and that their similarities are not biologically equivalent but evolved separately. In fact the originators of the term "halwaxiid" prefer an evolutionary "family tree" in which the halwaxiids are not monophyletic. The possibility of convergence is reinforced by the presence of a scleritome in a derived gastropod mollusc.

Other fossil organisms became involved in the debate as there were plausible arguments for considering them closely related to the halkieriids or Wiwaxia or both. Orthrozanclus, first described in 2007, looked an intermediate between the halkieriids and Wiwaxia as it had a shell like that of halkieriids, and unmineralized sclerites and long spines like those of Wiwaxia – in fact the article which first described Orthrozanclus introduced the term "halwaxiid". New finds of Odontogriphus, reported in 2006, put this animal into play as well – despite its lack of sclerites or shells, its feeding apparatus looks very like Wiwaxia's. The siphogonuchitids, a very Early Cambrian group known only from isolated sclerites among the small shelly fossils, also appear in analyses as their sclerites suggest this group may have been close to the ancestors of halkieriids. (Note: The original, possibly incomplete, list includes Australohalkieria, Drepanochites, Eohalobia, Halkieria, Lomasulcachites, Ninella, Ocruranus, Oikozetetes, Orthrozanclus, Sinosachites, Siphogonuchites, Thambetolepis, and Wiwaxia — Conway Morris, S.; Caron, J.B. (2007). "Halwaxiids and the Early Evolution of the Lophotrochozoans". Science. 315 (5816): 1255–8. Bibcode:2007Sci...315.1255M. doi:10.1126/science.1137187. PMID 17332408. S2CID 22556453.)

== Ecology ==
Halwaxiid sclerites were not able to grow once they had been formed, but must rather have been either moulted or resorbed to make way for new, larger sclerites; the smallest Wiwaxia specimens, 3.4 mm in length, appear to bear the same number of sclerites (minus the spines) as adults 5 cm long. The new sclerites cannot simply have poked between existing sclerites; rather they must have been shed or resorbed, either one at a time or all at once; presumably the latter, as the close-fitting nature of the armour does not seem compatible with the easy loss of individual sclerites.

== Suggested phylogenies ==
Since 1995 several phylogenies, or evolutionary "family trees", have been suggested for these organisms. The position of Wiwaxia is highlighted, since the position of this organism has been central to the debate since 1990.

- - Siphogonuchitida
  - - MOLLUSCA
      (crown group)
    - - "Siberian halkieriid"
      - - - - - Canadia
              - ANNELIDA
                (crown group)
            - Wiwaxia
          - Thambetolepis
            (halkieriid)
        - - Halkieria evangelista
          - BRACHIOPODA
            (crown group)

Cladogram: Conway Morris & Peel (1995)

- - ANNELIDA
  - - ? Kimberella
    - - Odontogriphus
      - - - - Wiwaxia
            - - Halkieriids
              - Neomeniomorpha / Solenogasters
                (Aplacophora)
              - Polyplacophora
              - Other crown group molluscs

Cladogram: Caron, Scheltema, et al. (2006)

- - - Kimberella
    - - Odontogriphus
      - - - Wiwaxia
          - - Siphogonuchitida
            - - Orthrozanclus
              - Halkieriids
        - - MOLLUSCA
            (crown group)
  - - - Canadia
      - ANNELIDA
        (crown group)
    - - Micrina
      - BRACHIOPODA
        (crown group)

- Kimberella
- - Odontogriphus
  - - MOLLUSCA
      (crown group)
    - - - Siphogonuchitida
        - - Halkieriids
          - - Orthrozanclus
            - Wiwaxia
      - - - Canadia
          - ANNELIDA
            (crown group)
        - - Micrina
          - BRACHIOPODA
            (crown group)

Cladograms: Conway Morris and Caron (2007) — Hypothesis 1 (left) and 2 (right).
The authors regard Hypothesis 1 as better supported by the evidence, but not robust.

- - Kimberella
  - Odontogriphus
  - - - - "Halsiphonids"
          (halkieriids +
          siphogonuchitids)
    - - - MOLLUSCA
          (crown group)
    - - Wiwaxia
      - - Canadia
        - ANNELIDA
          (crown group)
    - - - Micrina
        - BRACHIOPODA
          (crown group)

Butterfield's alternative.

Not depicted: Sun et al. (2018) propose Halkieria as a stem brachiopod, and Wiwaxia as a stem mollusc.

== Decline ==
Wiwaxia and Halkieria did not thrive for a long period of time and were extinct before the Cambrian was over. A possible reason for this is that during the Cambrian substrate revolution, the microbial mat's disappearance triggered an alternating pattern in the fauna that were present for the Halwaxiids to eat.

== Wiwaxia and Odontogriphus ==
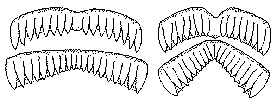
Conway Morris' reconstruction of Wiwaxia feeding apparatus (1985): opened for feeding (left); folded (right). In both cases the front of the animal is at the top.

Ever since the debate started in 1990, the most intense part has centered round Wiwaxia. Until 2006 only one, poor-preserved fossil of Odontogriphus had been described; but in that year a description of many new, well-preserved specimens highlighted similarities between the two organisms, making the classification of Odontogriphus equally controversial.

Conway Morris (1985) originally dismissed the earliest classification of Wiwaxia as a polychaete worm, because he thought there was little structural similarity between a polychaete's scale-like elytra and Wiwaxia's sclerites, and because the arrangement of the sclerites, with quite different numbers in each band, showed no sign of the regular segmentation that is a feature of polychaetes. Instead he thought Wiwaxia was very similar to shell-less aplacophoran molluscs, that it must have moved on a mollusc-like muscular foot, and that its feeding apparatus looked like a primitive form of the molluscan radula, a tooth-bearing chitinous "tongue". Hence he classified it as a "sister" of the molluscs. When he briefly described the first articulated specimens of Halkieria in 1990, Conway Morris wrote of "the halkieriid-wiwaxiid body plan" and that the halkieriids might be close relatives of molluscs.

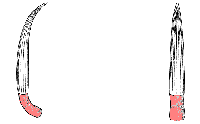
Wiwaxia spine, seen from front and side. They had relatively soft bases and were rooted in pockets in the skin
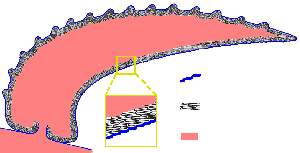
Halkieriid sclerite structure

Shortly after this in 1990 Butterfield published his first paper on Wiwaxia. He argued that, since Wiwaxia's sclerites appeared to be solid, they were not similar to the hollow sclerites of halkieriids. In fact he thought they were more similar to the chitinous bristles (setae) that project from the bodies of modern annelids and in some genera form leaf-like scales that cover the back like roof tiles - in composition, in detailed structure, in how they were attached to the body via follicle-like pockets in the skin, and in overall appearance. He also contended that Wiwaxia's feeding apparatus, instead of being mounted in the middle of its "head", was just as likely to be mounted in two parts on the sides of the "head", an arrangement that is common in polychaetes. He therefore classified Wiwaxia as a polychaete.

Conway Morris and Peel (1995) largely accepted Butterfield's arguments and treated Wiwaxia as an ancestor or "aunt" of the polychaetes. However they also argued that Wiwaxia was fairly closely related to and in fact descended from the halkieriids, as the sclerites are divided into similar groups, although those of halkieriids were much smaller, more numerous and hollow. They wrote that in 1994 Butterfield had found Wiwaxia sclerites that were clearly hollow. They noted that one specimen of Wiwaxia showed traces of a small shell, possibly a vestige left over from an earlier stage in the animal's evolution, and noted that one group of modern polychaetes also has what may be a vestigial shell. However they maintained that Wiwaxia's feeding apparatus was much more like a molluscan radula. The cladogram they presented showed the halkieriids split into three groups: one as "aunts" of brachiopods, animals whose modern forms have bivalve shells but differ from molluscs in having muscular stalks and a distinctive feeding apparatus, the lophophore; the second group of halkieriids as "aunts" of both Wiwaxia and annelid worms; and the earliest halkieriids as "great aunts" of all of these.

Marine biologist Amélie H. Scheltema et al. (2003) argued that Wiwaxia's feeding apparatus was very similar to the radulas of some modern shell-less aplacophoran molluscs, and that the sclerites of the two groups are very similar. They concluded that Wiwaxia was a member of a clade that includes molluscs.

Danish zoologist Danny Eibye-Jacobsen (2004) regarded bristles as a feature shared by molluscs, annelids and brachiopods. Hence even if Wiwaxia's sclerites closely resembled bristles, which he doubted, this would not prove that Wiwaxia's closest relative were annelids. He also pointed out that the very different numbers of sclerites in the various zones of Wiwaxia's body do not correspond to any reasonable pattern of segmentation. Since in his opinion Wiwaxia lacked other clearly polychaete features, he regarded this as an argument against classifying Wiwaxia as a polychaete. In his opinion there were no strong grounds for classifying Wiwaxia as a proto-annelid or a proto-mollusc, although he thought the objections against classification as a proto-annelid were the stronger.

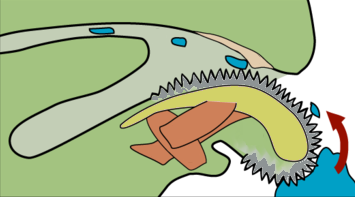
Snail radula at work = Food = Radula = Muscles = Odontophore "belt"

Caron, Scheltema et al. (2006) interpreted Odontogriphus's feeding apparatus as a forerunner of the molluscan radula, on the grounds that: the occasional and less distinct third tooth-row looked like evidence that the animals grew replacement tooth-rows at the rear of their mouths and shed worn-out ones from the front, as happens with molluscan radulae; the isolated pairs of tooth-rows they found, not associated with body fossils but in the same relative positions as in the more complete fossils, suggested they were mounted on a fairly tough surface, like the chitinous "belt" of a modern radula; they even found signs that discarded tooth-rows were sometimes eaten by the animals. They thought the teeth on the feeding apparatus of both Wiwaxia and Odontogriphus strongly resembled those of a modern group of molluscs, Neomeniomorpha. On the other hand, they thought Wiwaxia bore little resemblance to polychaetes as it showed no signs of segmentation, appendages in front of the mouth, or "legs" – all of which are typical polychaete features. Hence they classified both Odontogriphus, and Wiwaxia with its "nearly identical" feeding apparatus, as primitive relatives of molluscs.

Butterfield (2006) accepted that Wiwaxia and Odontogriphus were closely related but wrote, "…it certainly does not require that they be shoehorned into the same lineage. …the seemingly trivial distinction between these two taxa is exactly what is expected at the divergence points leading from a last common ancestor to extant phyla." In his opinion the feeding apparatus of these organisms, with consisted of two or at most four rows of teeth, could not perform the functions of the "belt-like" molluscan radula with its numerous tooth-rows; the different tooth-rows in both Wiwaxia and Odontogriphus tooth-rows also have noticeably different shapes, while those of molluscan radulae are produced one after the other by the same group of "factory" cells and therefore are almost identical. He also regarded lines running across the middle region of Odontogriphus fossils as evidence of external segmentation, since the lines are evenly spaced and run exactly at right angles to the long axis of the body. As in his earlier papers, Butterfield emphasized the similarities of internal structure between Wiwaxia's sclerites and the bristles of polychaetes, and the fact that polychates are the only modern organisms in which some of the bristles form a covering over the back. He therefore concluded that both Wiwaxia and Odontogriphus were stem-group polychaetes rather than stem-group molluscs.

In 2007 Conway Morris and Caron described a new fossil, Orthrozanclus, which had a mineralized shell like that of halkieriids, and unmineralized sclerites and long spines like those of Wiwaxia – and, like both of these, a soft underside which they interpreted as a muscular foot, and a similar arrangement of the sclerites into three concentric bands. Some of Orthrozanclus's sclerites appear to have been hollow, as the specimen includes what look like internal castings. They took these features as evidence that the halkieriids, Wiwaxia and Orthrozanclus were very closely related and formed the group "halwaxiids". However the simplest "family tree" faces an obstacle: the siphogonuchitids appear in earlier rocks and had mineralized sclerites. Hence Conway Morris and Caron found it necessary to consider two more complex family trees, concluding that "Hypothesis 1" fitted the available data better, but was sensitive to minor changes in the characteristics used:

1. Conway Morris and Caron considered this hypothesis the more likely, although it is not robust:
  - Kimberella and Odontogriphus were early, primitive molluscs, without sclerites or any kind of mineralized armor.
  - Wiwaxia, the siphogonuchitids, Orthrozanclus and Halkeria form a side-branch of the mollusc family tree, and diverged from it in that order. This would mean that: Wiwaxia was the first of them to have sclerites, which were unmineralized; the siphogonuchitids were the first to have mineralized sclerites, although their scleritomes were simpler; halkieriids then developed more complex scleritomes, and a shell at each end; in Orthrozanclus the scleritome became unmineralized again and the rear shell vanished or became so small that it has not been seen in fossils. This hypothesis faces the difficulty that siphogonuchitids appear in earlier rocks and have simpler scleritomes than the other three groups.
  - The annelids and brachiopods evolved from the other main branch of the family tree, which did not include the molluscs.
2. The alternative view is:
  - Kimberella and Odontogriphus are early, primitive lophotrochozoans.
  - The siphogonuchitids, Halkeria, Orthrozanclus and Wiwaxia form a group that is closer to the shared ancestor of annelids and brachiopods than it is to the molluscs. The siphogonuchitids are the first of the group to become distinctive, with two types of mineralized sclerites and a "shell" made of fused sclerites. Halkieriids had three types of sclerites and two one-piece shells. In Orthrozanclus the sclerites became unmineralized and in Wiwaxia the shells were lost.

In 2008 Butterfield described a set of micro-fossils dated to between 515 million years ago and 510 million years ago, found in the Mahto Formation in Alberta's Jasper National Park – this fossil bed is 5 – 10 M years older than the Burgess Shale in which the only known specimens of Odontogriphus and Wiwaxia were found. Some groupings of these micro-fossils showed a consistent arrangement that he interpreted as an "articulated apparatus" with tens of closely spaced tooth rows, apparently mounted on an organic base, and with noticeable signs of wear in the rows at one end. The rows were not quite identical, but he noted that some modern aplacophoran molluscs show similar variations. He concluded that the "articulated apparatus" was a genuine molluscan radula, most similar to those of modern aplacophorans or gastropods. He then commented on the contrast between this apparatus and the two or rarely three widely spaced and more heterogeneous tooth-rows found in fossils of Odontogriphus and Wiwaxia, and concluded that Odontogriphus and Wiwaxia were unlikely to be molluscs. He also noted that Wiwaxia lacked some polychaete features which he would expect to be easily preserved in fossils, and therefore classified Wiwaxia as a stem-group annelid, in other words an evolutionary "aunt" of modern annelids.

Recent finds indicate that Orthrozanclus is likely a halkieriid, but has little affinity to Wiwaxia.

== Halkieriids and siphogonuchitids ==
Most of the debate has been about halkieriids' relationship to molluscs, annelids and brachiopods. However a paper published in 2008 argued that halkieriids were closely related to chancelloriids, which have been generally regarded as sponges.

=== Relationship to Molluscs, Annelids and Brachiopods ===
Halkieriid sclerites were known for a long time as elements of the small shelly fossils. The first articulated specimen, with all their hard parts together, were collected in 1989 and were described briefly in 1990 by Conway Morris and Peel (1990). The same authors produced a more detailed analysis in 1995, which divided the halkieriids into three groups: one as "aunts" of brachiopods, animals whose modern forms have bivalve shells but differ from molluscs in having muscular stalks and a distinctive feeding apparatus, the lophophore; the second group of halkieriids as "aunts" of both Wiwaxia and annelid worms; and the earliest halkieriids as "great aunts" of all of these.

In 2003 Cohen, Holmer and Luter supported the halkieriid-brachiopod relationship, suggesting that brachiopods may have arisen from a halkieriid lineage that developed a shorter body and larger shells, and then folded itself and finally grew a stalk out of what used to be the back.

Vinther and Nielsen (2005) proposed instead that Halkieria was a crown group mollusc, in other words more similar to modern molluscs that to annelids, brachiopods or any intermediate groups. They argued that: Halkieria's sclerites resembled those of the modern solenogaster aplacophoran shell-less molluscs (see), of some modern polyplacophoran molluscs, which have several shell plates, and of the Ordovician polyplacophoran Echinochiton; Halkieria's shells are more similar to the shells of conchiferan molluscs, since shells of both of these groups show no trace of the canals and pores seen in polyplacophoran shell plates; the bristles of brachiopods and annelids are similar to each other but not to Halkieria's sclerites.

However Conway Morris (2006) criticized Vinther and Nielsen's classification of Halkieria as a crown group mollusc, on the grounds that the growth of the spicules in the aplacophorans and polyplacophorans is not similar to the method of growth deduced for the complex halkieriid sclerites; in particular, he said, the hollow spines of various molluscs are not at all like the halkieriid sclerites with their complex internal channels. Conway Morris repeated his earlier conclusion that halkieriids were close to the ancestors of both molluscs and brachiopods.

In their description of the newly discovered Orthrozanclus (2007), which has similarities to both Wiwaxia and the halkieriids, Conway Morris and Caron also took account of the siphogonuchitids, a group known only from isolated mineralized sclerites that resemble those of the halkieriids. They proposed the two "family trees" described above:

1. The halkieriids formed part of a "sister" group to the molluscs. This hypothesis implies that the halwaxiids were not monophyletic, since the siphogonuchitids appear between Wiwaxia and the halkieriids. Nevertheless, Conway Morris and Caron found that this phylogeny fitted the available data better, although it was not robust.
2. The siphogonuchitids plus the halwaxiids formed a "sister" group to the annelids and brachiopods, while the molluscs were "aunts" of all of these.

=== Relationship to chancelloriids ===
Porter (2008) revived an early 1980s idea that the sclerites of Halkieria are extremely similar to those of chancelloriids. These were sessile, bag-like, radially symmetric organisms with an opening at the top.

Since their fossils show no signs of a gut or other organs, chancelloriids were originally classified as some kind of sponge. Butterfield and Nicholas (1996) argued that they were closely related to sponges on the grounds that the detailed structure of chancellorid sclerites is similar to that of fibers of spongin, a collagen protein, in modern keratose (horny) demosponges. However Janussen, Steiner and Zhu (2002) denied that chancellorids were sponges on the grounds that: chancellorids' hollow sclerites, probably made of aragonite, were quite different from the solid, silica-based spines of demosponges; sponges have simple skins that are only one cell thick, while chancellorids' thicker, more complex skins resemble those of more complex animals. In their opinion chancellorids were at least members of the Epitheliazoa, a grade more complex than the Porifera, to which sponges belong.

Porter (2008) found that the sclerites of halkieriids and chancelloriids resemble each other at all levels: both have an internal "pulp cavity" and a thin external organic layer; the walls are made of the same material, aragonite; the arrangement of the aragonite fibers is in each is the same, running mainly from base to tip but with each being closer to the surface at the end nearest the tip. It is extremely improbable that totally unrelated organisms could have developed such similar sclerites independently, but the huge difference in the structures of their bodies makes it hard to see how they could be closely related. This dilemma may be resolved in various ways:

- One possibility is that chancelloriids evolved from bilaterian ancestors but then adopted a sessile lifestyle and rapidly lost all unnecessary features. However the gut and other internal organs have not been lost in other bilaterians that lost their external bilateral symmetry.
- On the other hand, perhaps chancelloriids are similar to the organisms from which bilaterians evolved, and the earliest bilaterians had similar sclerites. However, there are no fossils of such sclerites before 542 million years ago, while Kimberella from 555 million years ago was almost certainly a bilaterian, but shows no evidence of sclerites.
- One solution to this dilemma may be that preservation of small shelly fossils by coatings of phosphate was common only for a relatively short time, during the Early Cambrian, and that coelosclerite-bearing organisms were alive several million years before and after the time of phosphatic preservation.
- Alternatively, perhaps the common ancestor of both chancelloriids and halkieriids had very similar but unmineralized coelosclerites, and some intermediate groups independently incorporated aragonite into these very similar structures.
