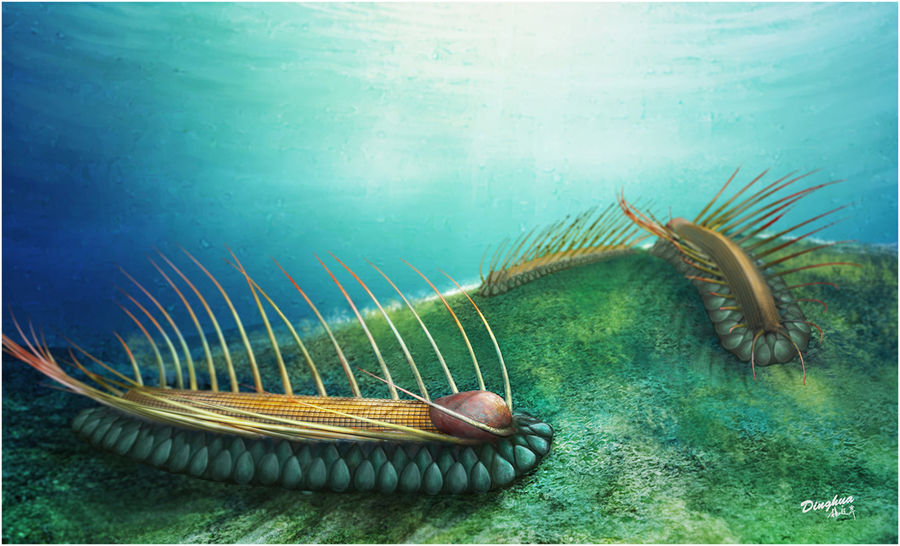
- Reconstruction of O. elongata by Zhao et al. (2017)
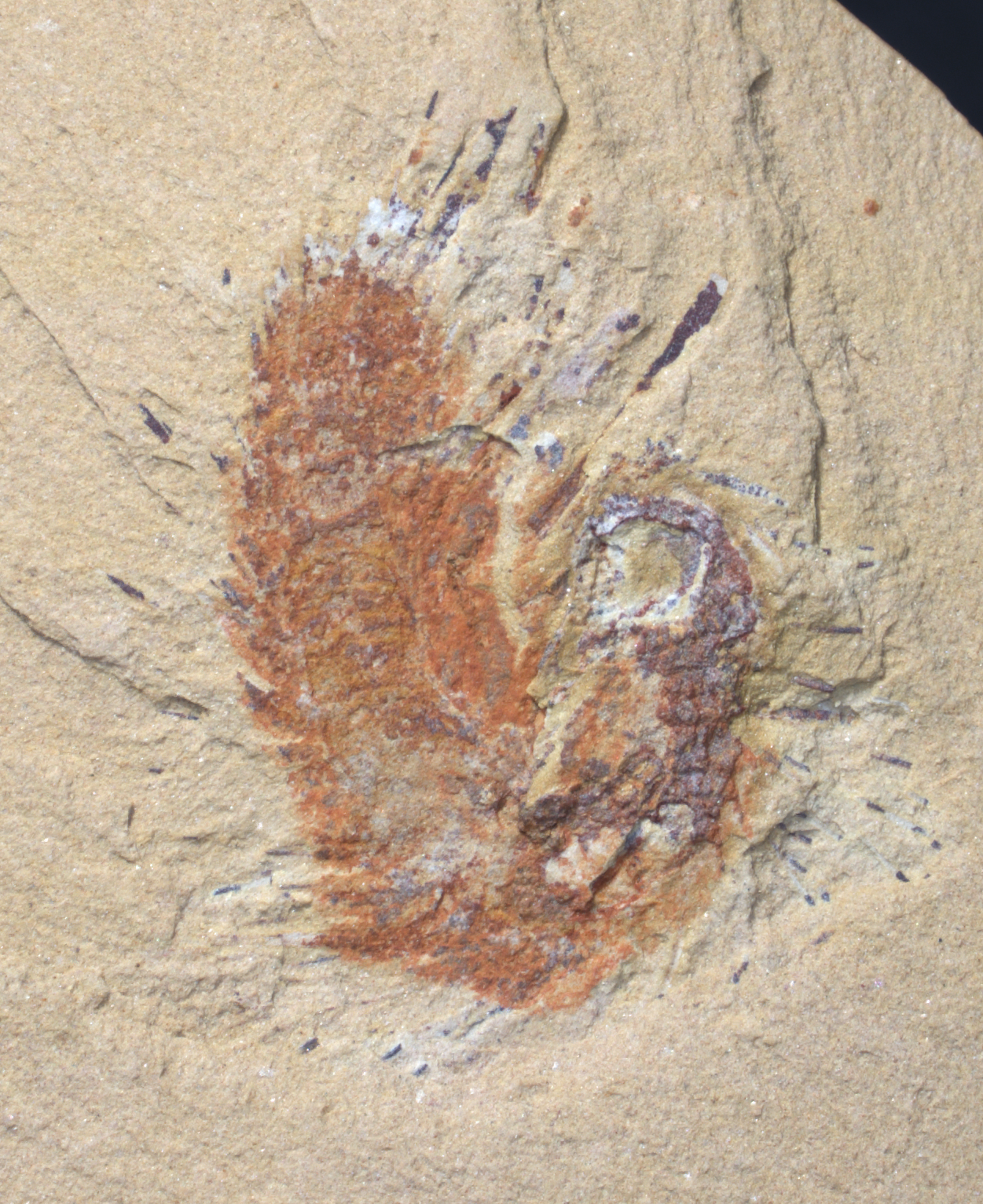
- Specimen of O. elongata, from Zhao et al. (2017)

Scientific classification
- Kingdom: Animalia
- Superphylum: Lophotrochozoa
- Phylum: Mollusca
- Family: †Halkieriidae
- Genus: †Orthrozanclus; Conway Morris & Caron, 2007

Species
- O. reburrus Conway Morris & Caron, 2007; O. elongata Zhao & Smith, 2017

= Orthrozanclus =

Orthrozanclus Temporal range: Early-Middle Cambrian (Stage 3-Wuliuan), 518–505 Ma

Extinct genus of Cambrian animals

Orthrozanclus (from Greek ὄρθρος + ζᾰ́γκλον (órthros + zánklon), "dawn scythe") is a genus of sea creatures known from two species, O. reburrus from the Middle Cambrian (~505 million years ago) Burgess Shale and O. elongata from Early Cambrian (~518 million years ago) Maotianshan Shales. Animals in this genus were one to two centimeters long, with spikes protruding from their armored bodies. The placement of this genus into a specific family is not universally accepted.

== History of discovery ==
Jean-Bernard Caron and Donald A. Jackson found a specimen in the Burgess Shale and in 2006 referred to it as "scleritomorph C" without a detailed description. In 2007 Caron and Simon Conway Morris published a description and named the fossil Orthrozanclus reburrus. The genus name means "Dawn scythe" and derives from Greek, with the species name meaning "bristling hair" in Latin.

The two known specimens of O. elongata were discovered from Maotianshan Shale in 2015 and 2016 and formally described the following year.

== Description ==
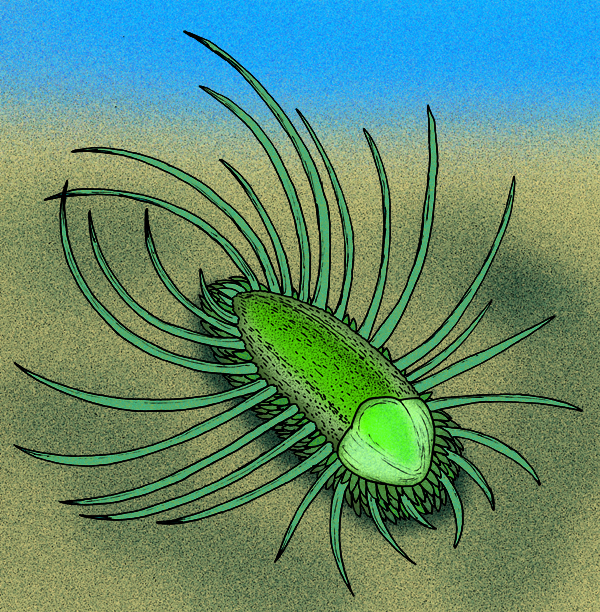
Reconstruction of O. reburrus, possibly with opposite orientation of peripheral sclerites

Orthrozanclus reburrus was 6–10.3 millimetres (0.24–0.41 in) long including its long spines, and had a fairly slim, roughly oval body that tapered towards the rear, was distinctly convex on top but was surrounded by a flatter rim. The underside was soft and unarmored, but the upward-facing surfaces were armored by: a small shell, near the front end; three zones of armor plates called "sclerites", which fitted close to the body and one of which ran all the way round the animal; 16 to 20 long, upwards-curving spines on each side of the body. The sclerites and spines were unmineralized, and had internal cavities that appear to have been circular in cross-section. The shell was convex and shaped like a triangle with rounded corners. It had a bulge at the front, a raised rear edge and a ridge along the middle that flared out towards the rear. It also had finely spaced rings that indicate growth by addition of material round the edges, and coarser ridges which may indicate that the animal was metameric, in other words built out of repeated "modules". The function of the shell at the front is unknown.

The animal clearly lived on the sea-floor, and is thought to have had a muscular foot rather like that of a snail.

== Classification ==
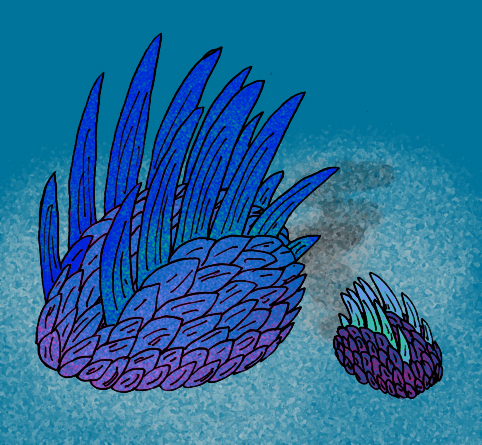
A reconstruction of Wiwaxia

Orthrozanclus′ sclerites are very similar to those of its Burgess Shale contemporary Wiwaxia. Its shell is very similar to: one of the two Burgess Shale shell types labelled Oikozetetes; the forward shell of Halkieriids, most of which are dated to the Early Cambrian; and those of other Early Cambrian fossils such as Ocruranus and Eohalobia. These similarities suggest that Orthrozanclus was an intermediate form between Wiwaxia and the Halkieriids and that all three of these taxa formed a monophyletic clade, in other words a group that consists of a common ancestor and all of its descendants. However this draws Orthrozanclus into a complex debate that has gone on since 1990 about whether Wiwaxia is more closely related to molluscs or to polychaete worms, and therefore about the entire "family tree" of the Lophotrochozoa, a "super-phylum" that is thought to contain modern molluscs, annelids and brachiopods as well as some extinct groups. The main opponent of this view, Nicholas Butterfield, proposes that Wiwaxia is more closely related to annelids while Halkieriids are very close to molluscs.

- - - Kimberella
    - - Odontogriphus
      - - - Wiwaxia
          - - Siphogonotuchida
            - - Orthrozanclus
              - Halkieriids
        - - MOLLUSCA
            (crown group)
  - - - Canadia
      - ANNELIDA
        (crown group)
    - - Micrina
      - BRACHIOPODA
        (crown group)

- - Kimberella
  - - Odontogriphus
    - - MOLLUSCA
        (crown group)
      - - - Siphogonotuchida
          - - Halkieriids
            - - Orthrozanclus
              - Wiwaxia
        - - - Canadia
            - ANNELIDA
              (crown group)
          - - Micrina
            - BRACHIOPODA
              (crown group)

Cladograms: Conway Morris and Caron (2007) — Hypothesis 1 (left) and 2 (right).
The authors regard Hypothesis 1 as better supported by the evidence, but not robust.

- - Kimberella
  - Odontogriphus
  - - - - "Halsiphonids"
          (halkieriids +
          siphogonotuchids)
    - - - MOLLUSCA
          (crown group)
    - - Wiwaxia
      - - Canadia
        - ANNELIDA
          (crown group)
    - - - Micrina
        - BRACHIOPODA
          (crown group)

Butterfield's alternative.

Zhao et al. (2017) propose an alternative - that halkieriids (including orthrozanclus and halkieria) are unrelated to Wiwaxia, but are instead related to the camenellan tommotiids and thus belong in the brachiopod stem lineage.

== See also ==
- Burgess Shale
- Halwaxiida
