= Ninella (mollusc) =

Scientific classification
- Kingdom: Animalia
- Phylum: Mollusca
- (unranked): †Halwaxiida
- Genus: †Ninella; Missarzhevsky & Mambetov, 1981

Type species
- Ninella serebrjannikovae Missarzhevksy in Missarzhevsky & Mambetov, 1981

Species
- N. serebrjannikovae; N. tarimensis

Genus of molluscs

Ninella is a genus of halwaxiid with a unique form of sclerite that typifies the informal grouping "ninellids", erected by Simon Conway Morris & A. J. Chapman, 2009.

== Description ==
Ninella sclerites are hollow and biomineralized. In form, they are hook- or scoop- shaped and strongly recurved, with left- and right- handed forms. The inner face of the sclerite is smooth, while the outer face of the sclerite is arched and may bear a tuberculate ornamentation similar to that of Hippopharangites. The dorsal and ventral faces of the sclerite are fairly steep, with variably developed longitudinal ridges. The apertural end of the sclerite is square-shaped and not differentiated from the rest of the sclerite and possesses a constricted, circular foramen (an opening which allows soft tissue to connect the main body and the internal cavity of the sclerite).

Unlike halkieriids and siphogonuchitids, which have a scleritome consisting of three and two types of sclerites respectively, the scleritome of Ninella consists of only one kind of sclerite. However, the presence of left- and right- handed morphs suggests that the scleritome was bilateral, as in the halkieriids.

== Relationships ==
Ninella was originally assigned to the tommotiids by Missarzhevsky & Mambetov, 1981. However, this placement is doubtful and it most likely belongs to the coeloscleritophorans. In form, Ninella is most similar to the halkieriids and siphogonuchitids, and in morphology approaches the siphogonuchitids most closely. However, Ninella likely has a connecting role between halkieriids and siphogonuchitids, and may be more closely related to halkieriids as siphogonuchitids lack a constricted foramen.

=== "Ninellids" ===
Ninella gives its name to the informal grouping "ninellids", erected by Simon Conway Morris & A. J. Chapman, 2009. Conway Morris and Chapman, 2009 chose not to erect a family for Ninella as doing so would lead to artificial subdivisions and conceal the morphological continuity that characterizes early metazoan evolution.
