= Sinosachites =

Sinosachites Temporal range: Early Cambrian

Scientific classification
- Kingdom: Animalia
- Order: †Chancelloriida
- Family: †Sachitidae
- Genus: †Sinosachites
- Species: †S. delicata

Binomial name
- †Sinosachites delicata Jell, 1981

Synonyms
- Sinosachites flabelliformis He, 1981; Thambetolepis?

Extinct genus of molluscs

Sinosachites is a genus of 'halkieriid' known only from sclerites; these have internal chambers that are sub-perpendicular to the central canal, to which they are connected by narrow channels. The chambers are the same diameter, ~40 μm, as the longitudinal canals in Australohalkieria; their greater number and arrangement as lateral rather than longitudinal bodies reflects the greater size of the Sinosachites sclerites, which measure about 1–2 mm in length.

The sclerites are probably synonymous with Thambetolepis, which was originally described from Australia. Left-hand and right-hand sclerites exist, so the animal was bilaterally symmetrical; as in Halkieria, palmate, cultrate and siculate sclerite morphologies exist.
