= Jean-Bernard Caron =

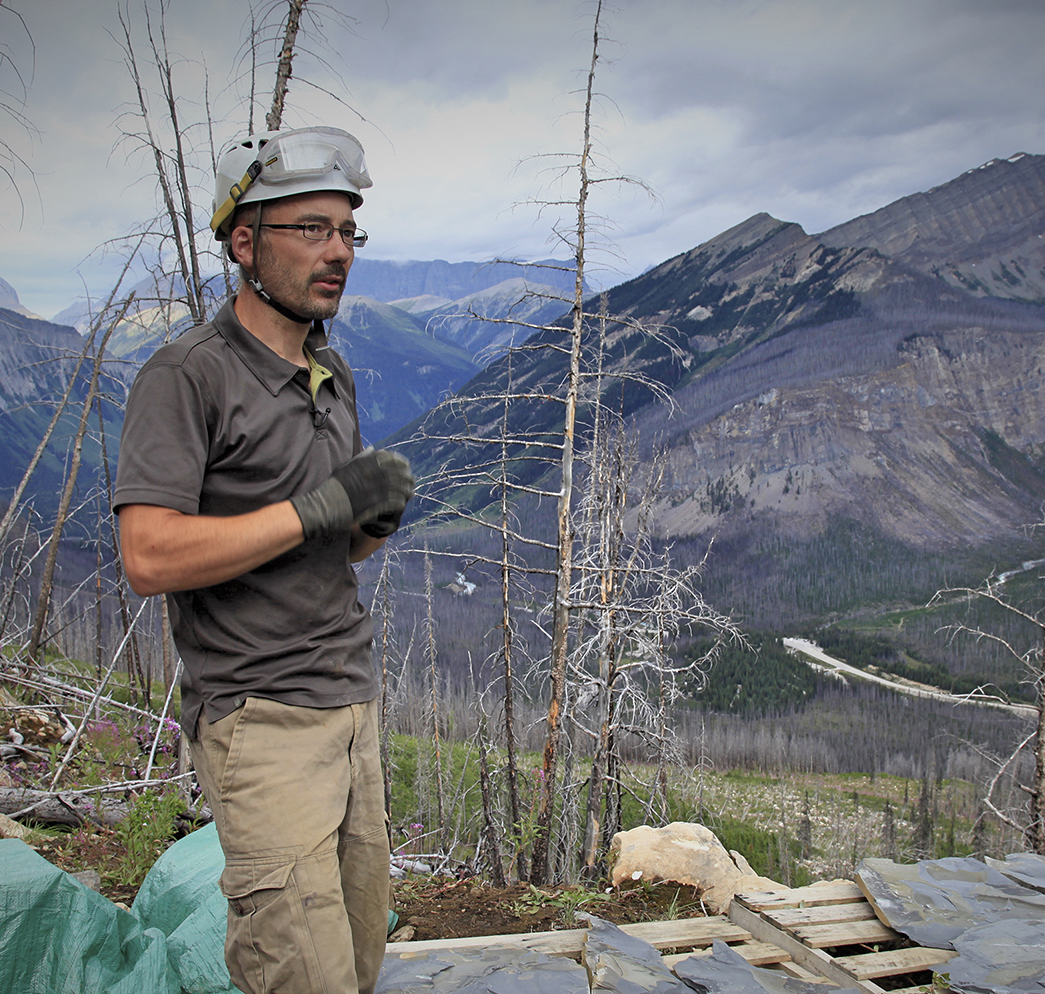
- Jean-Bernard Caron in the field at the Burgess Shale
- Born: Jean-Bernard Caron; France
- Education: Université Blaise Pascal, Clermont-Ferrand; Université Claude-Bernard, Lyon; University of Toronto, Toronto
- Known for: Burgess Shale; Cambrian explosion; Palaeoecology; Chengjiang biota
- Scientific career
- Fields: Palaeontology
- Workplaces: Royal Ontario Museum, Toronto
- Thesis: Taphonomy and Community Analysis of the Middle Cambrian Greater Phyllopod Bed, Burgess Shale (British Columbia) (2005)

Jean-Bernard Caron is a French and Canadian palaeontologist currently working as a curator of invertebrate palaeontology at the Royal Ontario Museum in Toronto. Caron is also cross-appointed at the University of Toronto as an associate professor in the Departments of Ecology and Evolutionary Biology and Earth Sciences. He is known for his work on the Burgess Shale.

== Education ==
Caron completed a bachelor's degree in natural history at the Université Blaise Pascal, Clermont-Ferrand in 1997 and his Diplôme d'études approfondies in palaeontology, sedimentology and chronology from the University Claude-Bernard, Lyon in 1999. His thesis focused on the problematic Burgess Shale animal Banffia constricta. Jean-Bernard Caron volunteered as a field assistant at the Burgess Shale in 1998 and, in 1999 and 2000, participated in the last two seasons led by Desmond Collins, then Curator of Invertebrate Palaeontology at the Royal Ontario Museum (ROM). He also spent several months at the ROM as a technical assistant, preparing Burgess Shale material. Caron completed his PhD on the taphonomy and palaeoecology of the Burgess Shale at the University of Toronto in the winter of 2004; in 2005 he won an NSERC postdoctoral fellowship to work on the Chengjiang Biota in order to compare it to the Burgess Shale biota.

== Research and career ==
Caron is currently the curator of invertebrate palaeontology at the Royal Ontario Museum. He held the position of associate chair of invertebrate palaeontology from 2006 to 2010.

His collaborative research program focuses mainly on the taphonomy, ecology, phylogeny, and biodiversity of Burgess Shale animals. The study material for his work comes mainly from the Royal Ontario Museum collections, the world's largest repository of Burgess Shale material, with over 150,000 specimens. Caron's work includes the description of new invertebrate species (Herpetogaster, Orthrozanclus, Siphusauctum, Yawunik, and Surusicaris) as well as poorly known invertebrate species (Hurdia and Spartobranchus), and has also involved the redescription of Pikaia, a primitive chordate, and Metaspriggina, a primitive fish. Several animals–Odontogriphus, Wiwaxia, Nectocaris, and Hallucigenia–had previously been regarded as new phyla by Stephen Jay Gould, but have now been reinterpreted as primitive members of known animal groups (stem groups). Caron leads regular fieldwork activities in the Canadian Rockies and discovered an important new Burgess Shale site near Marble Canyon in Kootenay National Park in 2012.

In 2010, Caron received the Pikaia Award for outstanding contributions to Canadian research from the Palaeontology Division of the Geological Association of Canada.

Caron also engages in outreach about the Burgess Shale. Notably, he spearheaded the production of the Virtual Museum of Canada's Burgess Shale site with Parks Canada, which won the Golden Trilobite Award from the Palaeontological Association and the Award of Excellence in Publications from the Ontario Museum Association.

Date	Position
2006–2010	Associate Curator of Invertebrate Palaeontology, Royal Ontario Museum
2007–	Associate Professor of Earth Sciences and Ecology and Evolutionary Biology, University of Toronto
2010-	Curator of Invertebrate Palaeontology, Royal Ontario Museum

== Awards and honours ==
- 2010 – Pikaia Award, Geological Association of Canada
- 2011 – Golden Trilobite Award, Palaeontological Association
- 2012 – Award of Excellence in Publications, Ontario Museum Association
