= Coeloscleritophoran =

Coeloscleritophora Temporal range: Cambrian-Ordovician

Scientific classification
- Kingdom: Animalia
- Phylum: incertae sedis
- Class: †Coeloscleritophora

Groups included
- Halwaxiida; Chancelloriidae; Sachitidae

Polyphyletic group of organisms

The Coelosclerithophorans are a polyphyletic group of fossil organisms bearing hollow sclerites made of aragonite, and with a supposedly distinctive microstructure.

Their skeletons may be homologous to those of the molluscs, and Halkieria looks very much like a polyplacophoran. The shells of this group and the molluscs appear to have originated in the same fashion. However, there are several reasons to doubt this relationship, many of which may not pass muster.

There are two groups within the coeloscleritophorans: the sachitids, to which Halkieria and Wiwaxia belong, and the chancellorids. The Ediacaran fossil Ausia has been touted as an ancestral 'intermediate' between both of these groups.

These are common constituents of Lower Cambrian small shelly fossil assemblages.
