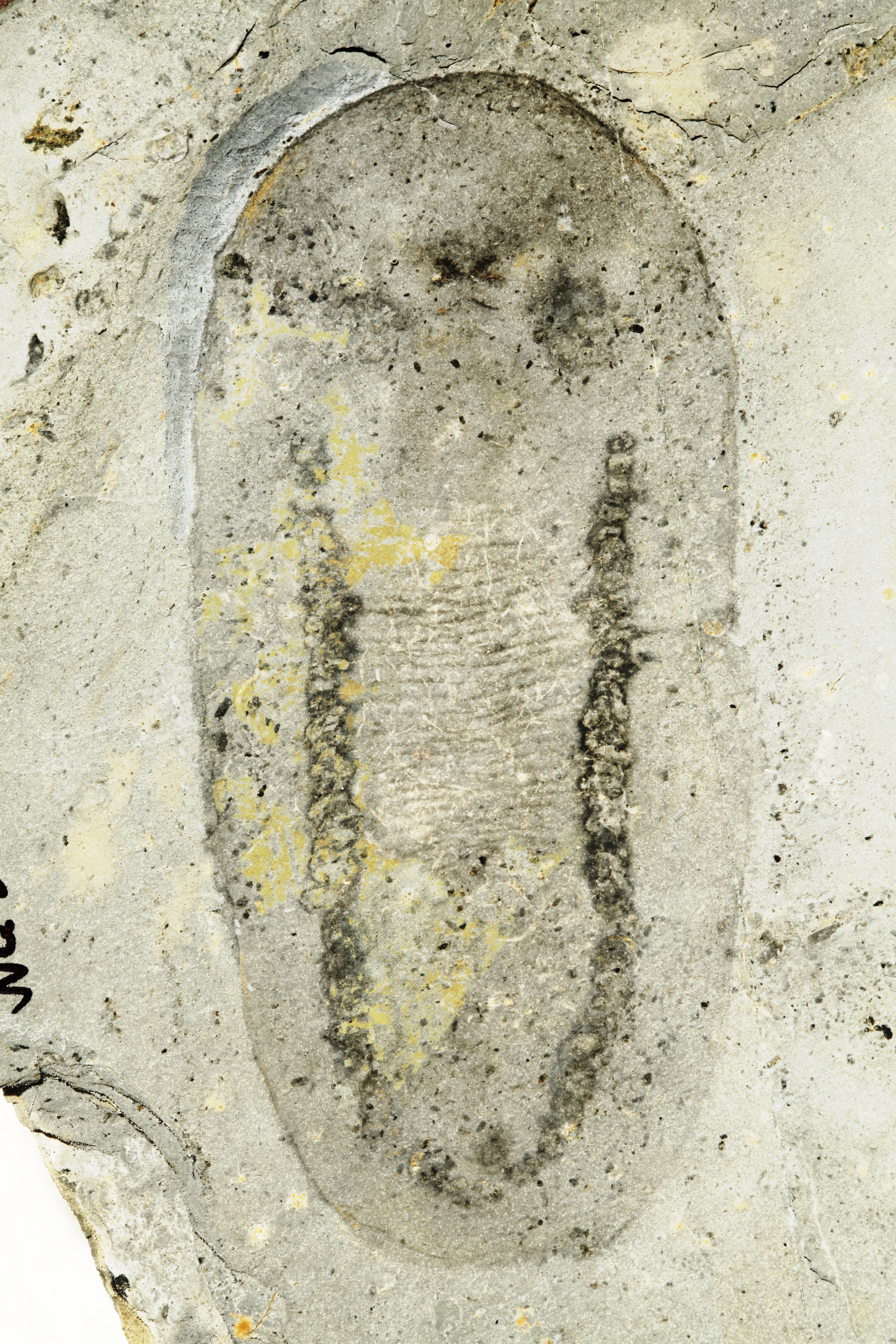
- Fossil of Odontogriphus from the Burgess Shale
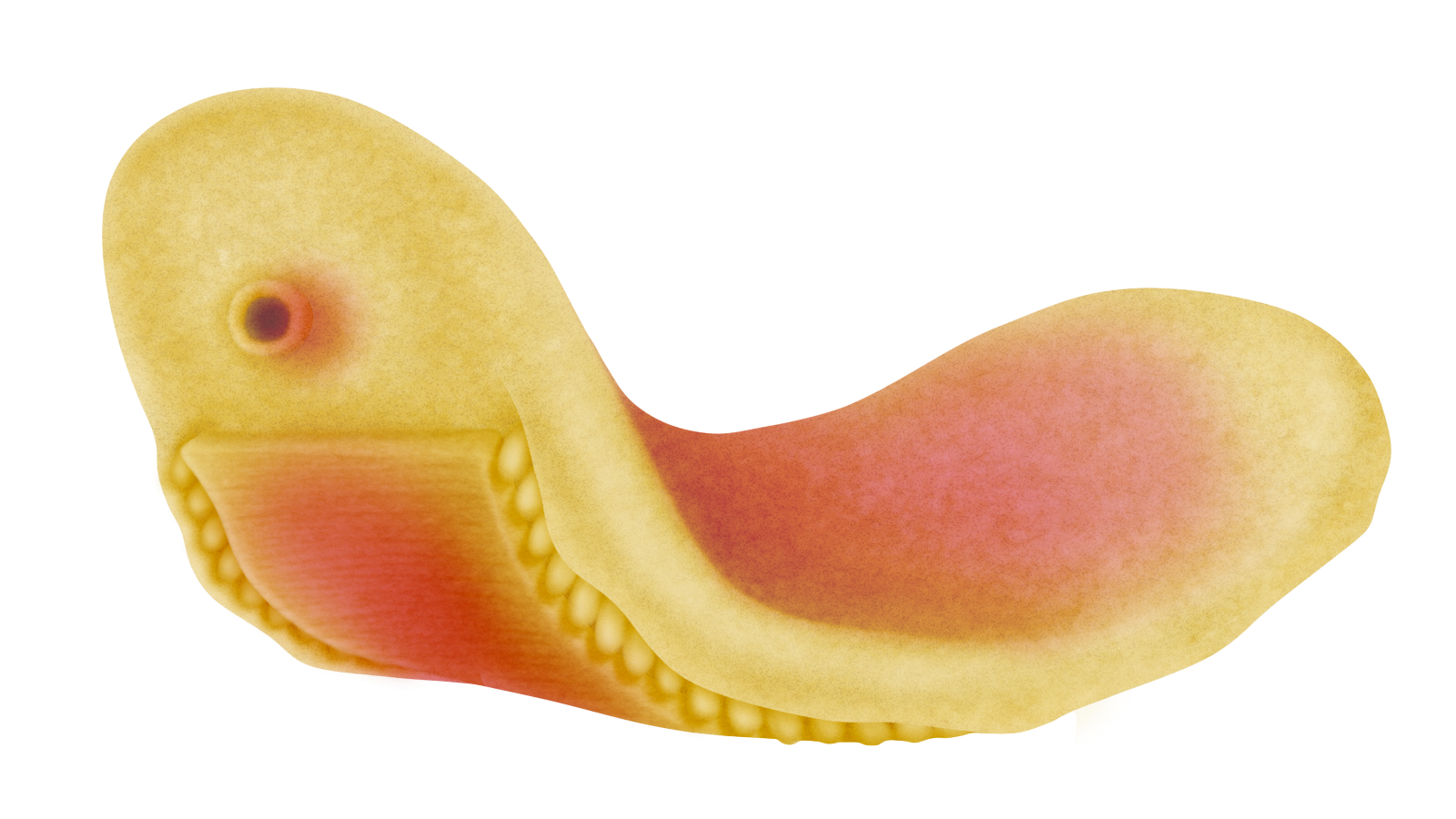
- Reconstruction of Odontogriphus

Scientific classification
- Kingdom: Animalia
- Superphylum: Lophotrochozoa
- Stem group: Mollusca (?)
- Family: †Odontogriphidae; Conway Morris, 1976
- Genus: †Odontogriphus; Conway Morris, 1976
- Species: †O. omalus

Binomial name
- †Odontogriphus omalus Conway Morris, 1976

= Odontogriphus =

Odontogriphus Temporal range: Burgess Shale

Genus of soft-bodied animals from middle Cambrian

Odontogriphus (from Greek: ὀδούς odoús, 'tooth' and Greek: γρῖφος grîphos, 'riddle') is a genus of soft-bodied animals known from middle Cambrian Lagerstätte. Reaching as much as 12.5 centimetres (4.9 in) in length, Odontogriphus is a flat, oval bilaterian which apparently had a single muscular foot and a "shell" on its back that was moderately rigid but of a material unsuited to fossilization.

Originally it was known from only one specimen, but 189 new finds in the years immediately preceding 2006 made a detailed description possible. (221 specimens of Odontogriphus are known from the Greater Phyllopod bed, where they comprise 0.42% of the community.) As a result, Odontogriphus has become prominent in the debate that has gone on since 1990 about the evolutionary origins of molluscs, annelid worms and brachiopods. It is thought that Odontogriphus's feeding apparatus, which is "nearly identical" to Wiwaxia's, is an early version of the molluscan radula, a chitinous "tongue" that bears multiple rows of rasping teeth. Hence Odontogriphus and Wiwaxia are often classified as closely related to true molluscs.

== History of discovery ==
Charles Doolittle Walcott found one specimen during one of his field trips to the Burgess Shale between 1910 and 1917. In the 1970s Simon Conway Morris re-examined the specimen and tentatively concluded that it was a swimming lophophorate, in other words related to the ancestors of molluscs, annelid worms and brachiopods. In 2006 Caron, Scheltema et al. published a new analysis based on 189 recently collected specimens, all from the Burgess Shale.

== Description ==
Diagrammatic reconstruction of Odontogriphus: top at left, underside at right.

Odontogriphus was apparently a very rare species, accounting for less than 0.5% of the individual organisms found in the same fossil beds. Most of the fossils consist of two parts of a split block of rock, the upper part giving a "casting" of the animal's upper surface and the lower giving one of its underside.

Odontogriphus was a flat-bodied animal ranging from 3.3 millimetres (0.13 in) to 125 millimetres (4.9 in) in length, with parallel sides and semi-circular ends. The specimens examined by Caron, Scheltema et al. (2006) had the same ratio of length to width irrespective of size. The body outlines are bilaterally symmetrical in all fairly complete specimens, even those in which internal features were preserved asymmetrically. Caron, Scheltema et al. (2006) interpreted this as evidence that the animals had on their backs "shells" that were rigid enough to resist whatever stresses distorted the internal features, but were not tough enough to be preserved by fossilization – similar, for example, to finger nails. Relatively broad wrinkles, parallel to each other and usually straight, run across the central region of the body in some specimens.

Caron, Scheltema et al. (2006) found evidence of a circular mouth on the underside, with two and occasionally three tooth-bearing structures that they interpreted as a feeding apparatus and very similar to that of Wiwaxia. Odontogriphus's feeding apparatus was located on the midline, about 15% of the total body length from the front edge of the fossils. The mouthparts comprised two to three rows, each comprising about two dozen carbonaceous teeth arranged symmetrically about a medial tooth, with one or two lateral teeth substantially smaller than the central teeth. The teeth operated by passing around an underlying "tongue", with the tooth rows deforming as they did so. The teeth probably scooped through the sea-floor mud, feeding on any detritus within it.

On either side of the feeding apparatus there is a circular structure that Caron, Scheltema et al. (2006) interpreted as salivary glands. They also found evidence of other parts of the digestive tract: a gullet connecting to the rear of the mouth; a relatively short stomach; and a straight much longer intestine, ending at an anus near the rear of the underside. A large gland apparently overlies the posterior portion of the gut. A pair of structures on either side of the intestine and a little behind the stomach may have been gonads or digestive organs. Muscular tissue is apparently preserved in the head and the foot, with a distribution that strikingly resembles that observed in modern chitons.

The fossils showed signs of a thickened central structure that Caron, Scheltema et al. (2006) thought was on the underside and probably represents a muscular sole that was a little over half as wide as the whole animal. It was U-shaped, with the "open" end behind the mouth and the rounded end a little forward of the animal's rear edge. The anus apparently was slightly ahead of the rounded end. All the edges of the "foot" except the front were surrounded by darker patches, which are sometimes separated from the rest of the body by a thin layer of sediment.

== Phylogeny ==
Odontogriphus has become prominent in the debate that has gone on since 1990 about the evolutionary origins of molluscs, annelid worms and brachiopods. Caron, Scheltema et al. (2006) interpreted Odontogriphus's feeding apparatus as a forerunner of the molluscan radula, on the grounds that: the occasional and less distinct third tooth-row looked like evidence that the animals grew replacement tooth-rows at the rear of their mouths and shed worn-out ones from the front, as happens with molluscan radulae; the isolated pairs of tooth-rows they found, not associated with body fossils but in the same relative positions as in the more complete fossils, suggested they were mounted on fairly tough surfaces, like the chitinous "belts" of modern radulae; they even found signs that discarded tooth-rows were sometimes eaten by the animals. Hence they classified both Odontogriphus, and Wiwaxia with its "nearly identical" feeding apparatus, as primitive relatives of molluscs.

- - ANNELIDA
  - - ? Kimberella
    - - Odontogriphus
      - - - - Wiwaxia
            - - Halkieriids
              - Neomeniomorpha / Solenogasters
                (Aplacophora)
              - Polyplacophora
              - Other crown group molluscs

Cladogram: Caron, Scheltema, et al. (2006)

In line with this classification they interpreted the dark patches round the foot as gill-like ctenidia, another feature of some molluscs; and the sediment that sometimes appeared in the fossils between the foot and supposed ctenidia suggested the presence of a mantle cavity. They also concluded that Odontogriphus was closely related to the Ediacaran animal Kimberella, whose fossils also show signs of a fairly rigid upper "shell" made of a material that did not fossilize, and which has been interpreted as a very mollusc-like organism.

They went on to classify the halkieriids as nearly modern molluscs, since in their opinion halkieriids' "chain mail" coats of mineralized sclerites were an advance on the unmineralized sclerites of Wiwaxia and also resembled the armor of some living shell-less aplacophoran molluscs, the Neomeniomorpha. As a result, they concluded that the whole Kimberella-Odontogriphus-Wiwaxia-mollusc lineage must have diverged from that of the annelid worms some time before the appearance of Kimberella in the Ediacaran period.

- - Kimberella
  - Odontogriphus
  - - - - "Halsiphonids"
          (halkieriids +
          siphogonotuchids)
    - - - MOLLUSCA
          (crown group)
    - - Wiwaxia
      - - Canadia
        - ANNELIDA
          (crown group)
    - - - Micrina
        - BRACHIOPODA
          (crown group)

Butterfield's alternative:

This brought Odontogriphus into the center of a debate that had been going on since 1990, when Butterfield denied that Wiwaxia was a forerunner of molluscs and argued that it was an evolutionary "aunt" of annelids. In particular he had argued that: Wiwaxia sclerites were internally much more like the bristles of polychaete annelids such as Canadia than like any forerunner of molluscan shell plates; and in his opinion Wiwaxia's feeding apparatus was more similar to that of some polychaetes than to a molluscan radula. Caron, Scheltema, et al. (2006) thought Wiwaxia bore little resemblance to polychaetes as it showed no signs of segmentation, appendages in front of the mouth, or "legs" – all of which are typical polychaete features.

A few months later in 2006 Butterfield returned to the fray. As in 1990, he argued that Wiwaxia's sclerites were internally much more like the bristles of polychaete annelids such as Canadia than like any forerunner of molluscan shell plates; since a 2005 paper had downplayed this argument with the comment that similar bristles also appear in molluscs and brachiopods, he pointed out that modified bristles appear as a covering over the back only in polychaetes and hence Wiwaxia' sclerites should indeed be regarded as like polychaetes' bristles.

In addition he argued that Odontogriphus' shedding and replacement of tooth-rows, the rows' staying in the same relative positions when isolated and the evidence that Odontogriphus sometimes swallowed discarded tooth-rows did not prove that Odontogriphus was an evolutionary "aunt" of molluscs, since eunicid polychaetes also molt and replace their feeding apparatus (which sometimes resembles a radula), and sometimes eat the discarded material. He also doubted whether the two tooth-rows of Odontogriphus and Wiwaxia could perform all the functions of the multi-row radula – rasping, capturing scraped food, sorting it and transporting it to the gullet. In his opinion the differences between the narrower first tooth-row and slightly wider second one in both Odontogriphus and Wiwaxia were unlike those of a molluscan radula, in which the much more numerous tooth-rows are identical; instead he argued that these two rows resembled the permanent lower jaw and moltable upper jaw of modern dorvilleid polychaetes.

While Butterfield agreed that the dark patches round the foot served as gills, he denied that they were similar in structure and mode of development to molluscan ctenidia. In his opinion the flattened remains of Odontogriphus were formed by relatively tough extracellular secretions, such as jaws, bristles and toughened skin, and do not include purely or primarily cellular tissues, such as muscles or gonads. He therefore thought the respiratory organs round the edge of Odontogriphus' foot could not be molluscan ctenidia, since these are covered by purely cellular tissue. Instead he suggested that they might be brachiopod lophophores, which are feeding organs that contain a lot of extracellular material, or polychaete branchiae, which are respiratory organs composed largely of non-cellular cuticle – both of these types of structure have been found in the Burgess Shale, in which all the known specimens of Odontogriphus have been discovered.

Caron, Scheltema, et al. (2006) had suggested that the wrinkles on the top surfaces of Odontogriphus specimens were caused by the rippling contractions of a mollusc-like muscular foot. Butterfield disputed this on the grounds that: a molluscan foot is also mainly composed of cellular material, which he thought unlikely to be fossilized in Burgess Shale conditions; the wrinkles were too straight and ran too precisely across the animals' bodies; the gaps between them were the same size as the gaps between the gill-like structures round the foot. Instead he argued that they were evidence of externally visible segmentation, which is found in polychaetes but not in molluscs. He concluded that Wiwaxia was an evolutionary "aunt" of polychaetes, while Odontogriphus could be an evolutionary "aunt" of polychaetes or of molluscs or of brachiopods – or even a "great aunt" of all three, as it could have been an early member of the lophotrochozoa, a "super-phylum" that includes the polychaetes, molluscs and brachiopods.

In January 2007 Caron, Scheltema, et al. published a vigorous reply to Butterfield's arguments – near the end they wrote, "Many of Butterfield's misconceptions might well have been avoided had he taken the opportunity to examine all the new material that formed the basis of our study. ..." They said they had found in body fossils of Odontogriphus visible traces of the membrane on which its tooth-rows were mounted; in their opinion this was clear evidence of a basic belt-like radula assembly with regularly spaced tooth-rows, a feature unique to molluscs. On the other hand, they wrote, eunicid polychaetes' jaws have only the vaguest similarity to radulae, and other annelids' jaws grow continuously without replacement; and they supported this with a point-by-point comparison of Odontogriphus' feeding apparatus with that of the dorvilleid polychaetes which Butterfield claimed it resembled. In answer to Butterfield's claim that the respiratory organs round the foot could not be molluscan ctenidia because these mainly cellular structures would not have fossilized in the Burgess Shale conditions, they wrote that: fairly soft cellular tissue belonging to the stomach is fossilized in many Odontogriphus specimens; some molluscan gills are stiffened by non-cellular material, for example in polyplacophorans. They pointed out that the wrinkles that appear across the body in views from the top occur only in the mid-section, and there is no sign that the tough "shell" plate on the animal's back was segmented; hence in their opinion Odontogriphus could not have been an annelid. On the other hand, wrinkles are seen in the feet of dead chitons. Wiwaxia, they argued, was clearly not segmented, as the numbers of sclerites in its three concentric groups did not match at all. They criticized Butterfield's main argument for "shoehorning" Wiwaxia into the polychaetes, that its sclerites were secreted by microvillae; such structures, they wrote, were also found in several groups of molluscs. Finally, in their opinion the absence of "legs" in Wiwaxia ruled out a close relationship with polychaetes.

In 2008 Butterfield described a set of micro-fossils dated to between 515 million years ago and 510 million years ago, found in the Mahto Formation in Alberta's Jasper National Park – this fossil bed is 5 – 10 M years older than the Burgess Shale in which the only known specimens of Odontogriphus and Wiwaxia were found. Some groupings of these micro-fossils showed a consistent arrangement that he interpreted as an "articulated apparatus" with tens of closely spaced tooth rows, apparently mounted on an organic base, and with noticeable signs of wear in the rows at one end. The rows were not quite identical, but he noted that some modern aplacophoran molluscs show similar variations. He concluded that the "articulated apparatus" was a genuine molluscan radula, most similar to those of modern aplacophorans or gastropods. He then commented on the contrast between this apparatus and the two or rarely three widely spaced and more heterogeneous tooth-rows found in fossils of Odontogriphus and Wiwaxia, and concluded that Odontogriphus and Wiwaxia were unlikely to be molluscs.

However, a 2012 study re-examined the mouthparts of these two genera, and identified problems with previous interpretations. Most importantly, the mouthparts contain a central rachidian tooth—a key radular characteristic. In light of this new reconstruction, a molluscan affinity seems well supported. Further support for a position in the molluscan total group is provided by details of its musculature, and from further details obtained from its close relative Wiwaxia.

== See also ==
- Paleobiota of the Burgess Shale
