= Thambetolepis =

Thambetolepis Temporal range: Cambrian, 530–513 Ma

Scientific classification
- Kingdom: Animalia
- Order: †Chancelloriida
- Family: †Sachitidae
- Genus: †Thambetolepis; Jell, 1981
- Species: †T. d. (?)

Binomial name
- †Thambetolepis delicata (?) Jell, 1981

Synonyms
- ?Sinosachites flabelliformis He, 1981

Genus of molluscs

Thambetolepis is a dubious genus of sachitid halkieriid from the Cambrian (530-513 Ma). The genus Sinosachites may have been the same as Thambetolepis.

The sclerites of Sinosachites are probably synonymous with Thambetolepis, which was originally described from Australia. Left-hand and right-hand sclerites exist, so the animal was bilaterally symmetrical; as in Halkieria, palmate, cultrate and siculate sclerite morphologies exist. The chambers are the same diameter, ~40 μm, as the longitudinal canals in Australohalkieria; their greater number and arrangement as lateral rather than longitudinal bodies reflects the greater size of the Sinosachites sclerites, which measure about 1–2 mm in length.
