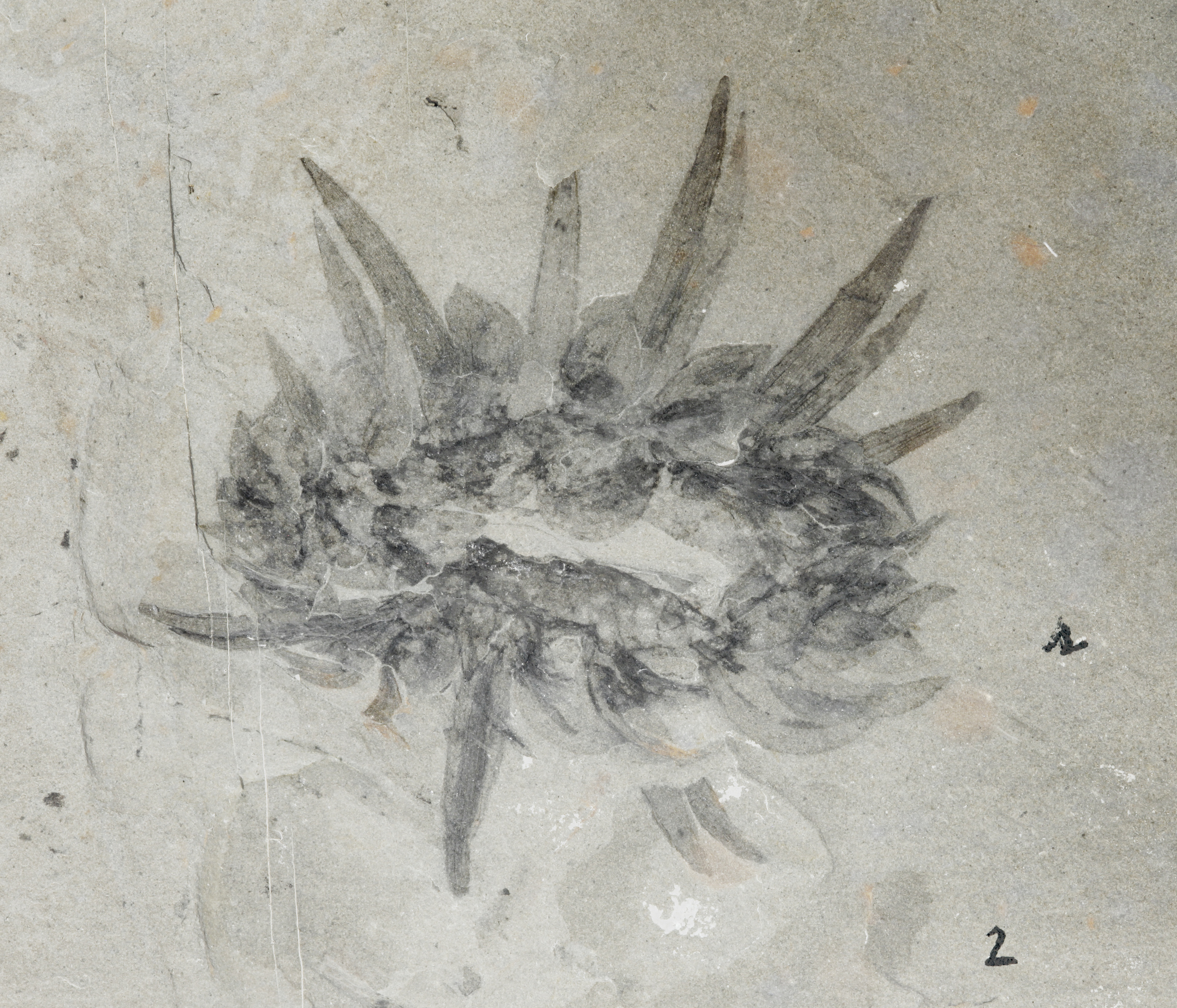
- Fossil showing underside of Wiwaxia corrugata from the Burgess Shale. From Smith (2014)

Scientific classification
- Kingdom: Animalia
- Superphylum: Lophotrochozoa
- Phylum: Mollusca (?)
- Family: †Wiwaxiidae; Walcott, 1911
- Genus: †Wiwaxia; Walcott, 1911

Type species
- Wiwaxia corrugata (Matthew, 1899)

Species
- W. corrugata (Matthew, 1899); W. foliosa Yang et al., 2014; W. papilio Zhang, Smith & Shu, 2015; W. taijiangensis Zhao, Qian & Lee, 1994; W. herka Conway Morris et al., 2015; W. douposiensis Sun et al., 2024

Synonyms
- Orthotheca corrugata Matthew, 1899

= Wiwaxia =

Wiwaxia Temporal range: Early Cambrian to Middle Cambrian (Stage 3 to Wuliuan), 520–505 Ma Possible record of Late Cambrian and Ordovician period

Genus of Cambrian animals

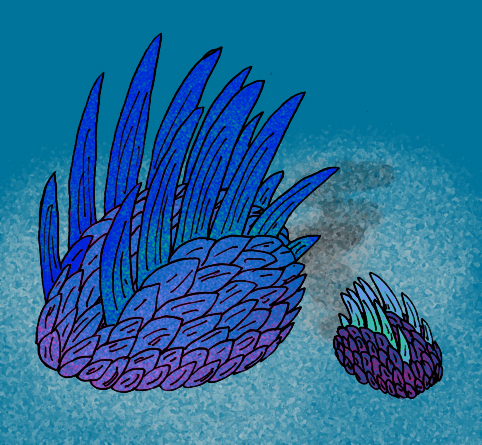
Reconstruction of the Wiwaxia Corrugata

Wiwaxia is a genus of prehistoric soft-bodied animals that were covered in carbonaceous scales and spines that protected it from predators. Wiwaxia fossils—mainly isolated scales, but sometimes complete, articulated fossils—are known from early Cambrian and middle Cambrian fossil deposits across the globe. The living animal would have measured up to 5 centimetres (2 in) when fully grown, although a range of juvenile specimens are known, the smallest being 2 millimetres (0.08 in) long.

Wiwaxia's affinity has been a matter of debate, causing researchers to be long split between two possibilities. On the one hand, its rows of scales looked superficially similar to certain scale worms (annelids); conversely, its mouthparts and general morphology suggested a relationship to the shell-less molluscs. More recently, evidence for a molluscan affinity has been accumulating, based on new details of Wiwaxia's mouthparts, scales, and growth history. The name derives from Wiwaxy Peak in British Columbia.

The proposed clade Halwaxiida contains Wiwaxia as well as several similar Cambrian animals.

== Description ==
This article concentrates on the species Wiwaxia corrugata, which is known from hundreds of complete specimens in the Burgess Shale; other species are known only from fragmentary material or limited sample sizes.

=== Body ===
Wiwaxia was bilaterally symmetrical; viewed from the top the body was elliptical with no distinct head or tail, and from the front or rear it was almost rectangular. It reached 5 centimetres (2 in) in length. Estimating their height is difficult because specimens were compressed after death; a typical specimen may have been 1 centimetre (0.39 in) high excluding the spines on their backs. The ratio of width to length does not appear to change as the animals grew.

Wiwaxia's flat underside was soft and unarmored; most of the surface was occupied by a single slug-like foot. Little is known of the internal anatomy, although the gut apparently ran straight and all the way from the front to the rear. At the front end of the gut, about 5 millimetres (0 in) from the animal's front in an average specimen about 2.5 centimetres (0.98 in) long, there was a feeding apparatus that consisted of two (or in rare large specimens three) rows of backward-pointing conical teeth. The feeding apparatus was tough enough to be frequently preserved, but unmineralized and fairly flexible.

=== Sclerites ===
Wiwaxia sclerite zones, seen from front

The animal was covered in eight rows of small ribbed armor plates called sclerites; these lay flat against the body, overlapped so that the rear of one covered the front of the one behind, and formed five main regions—the top; the upper part of the sides; the lower part of the sides; the front; and the bottom. Most of the sclerites were shaped like oval leaves, but the ventro-lateral ones, nearest the sea-floor, were crescent-shaped, rather like flattened bananas, and formed a single row. Larger specimens (>~15 mm) bear two rows of ribbed spines running from front to rear, one along each side of the top surface, and projecting out and slightly upward, with a slight upward curve near the tips. Although the spines in the middle of each row are usually the longest, up to 5 centimetres (2 in) long, a few specimens have rather short middle spines that represent part-grown replacements.

Each sclerite was rooted separately in the body; the roots of body sclerites are 40% of the external length or a little less, while the roots of the spines are a little over 25% of the external length; all were rooted in pockets in the skin, rather like the follicles of mammalian hair. The roots of the body sclerites were significantly narrower than the sclerites, but the spines had roots about as wide as their bases; both types of root were made of fairly soft tissue. They bore protrusive, presumably structural, ribs on their upper and (seemingly) lower surfaces. The sclerites and spines were not mineralized, but made of a tough organic (carbon-based) biopolymer. Butterfield (1990) examined some sclerites under both optical and scanning electron microscopes and concluded that they were not hollow, and that the bases split and spread to form the blades, a pattern that is also seen in monocot leaves. The sclerites bear an internal fabric of longitudinal chambers, which suggest that they were secreted from their bases in the manner of Lophotrochozoan sclerites.

As known from Marrella and Canadia, its sclerites may have been iridescent due to evidence of diffraction grating, although questioned in later study.

=== Ontogeny ===
Wiwaxia's scleritome comprises eight rows of sclerites, arranged in bundles. Sclerites are periodically shed and replaced during growth, with the number of sclerites in a given bundle increasing as the animal ages to produce a thicker scleritome. Once specimens reach a certain size, spines are added to the scleritome; this size is ~15 mm in W. corrugata but substantially smaller in W. taijengensis. One juvenile specimen was originally interpreted as molting, but in fact represents a single, folded, individual.

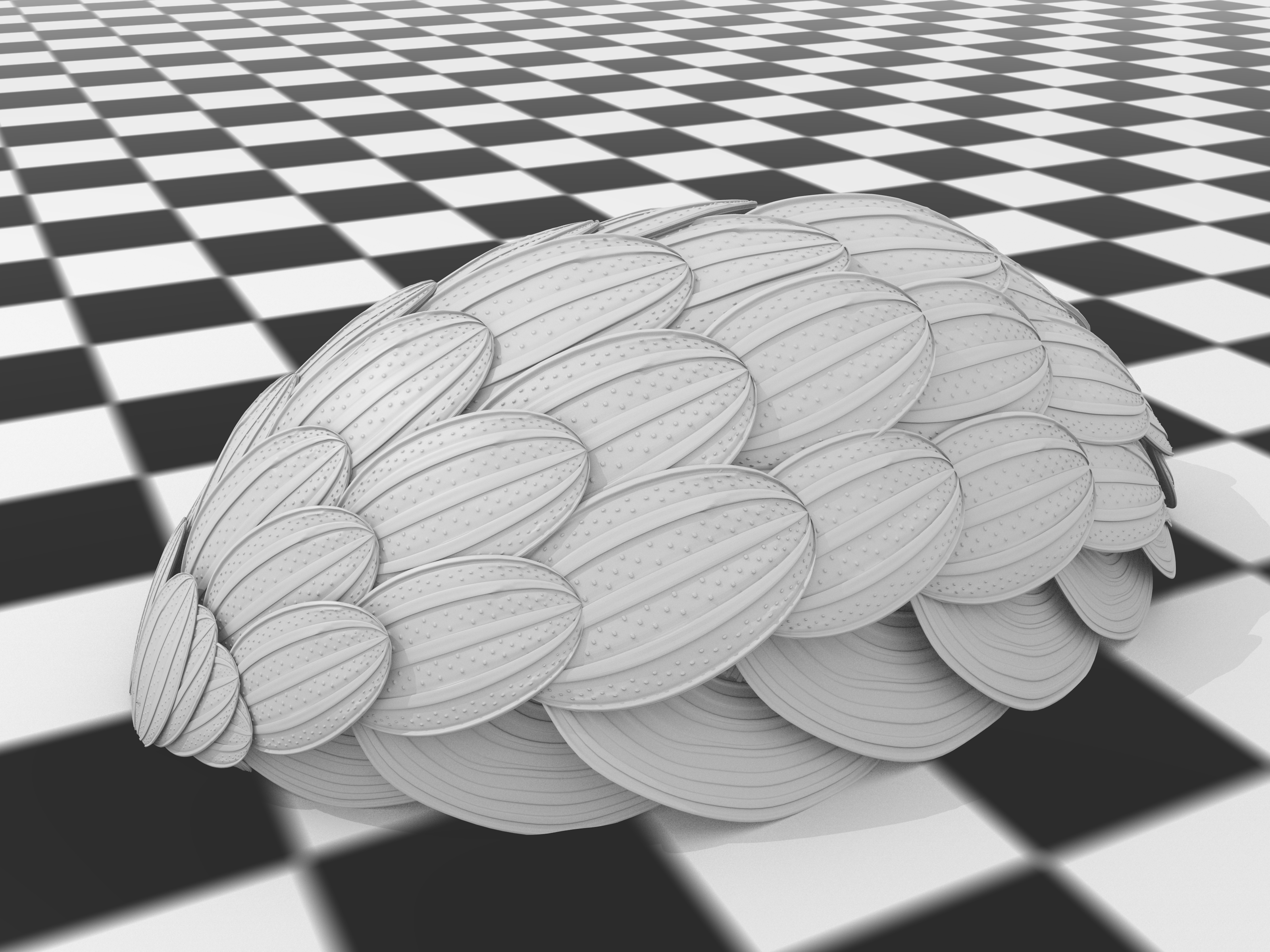
Computer reconstruction of juvenile Wiwaxia corrugata individual. Each checkered square has an area of 1 mm^{2}.

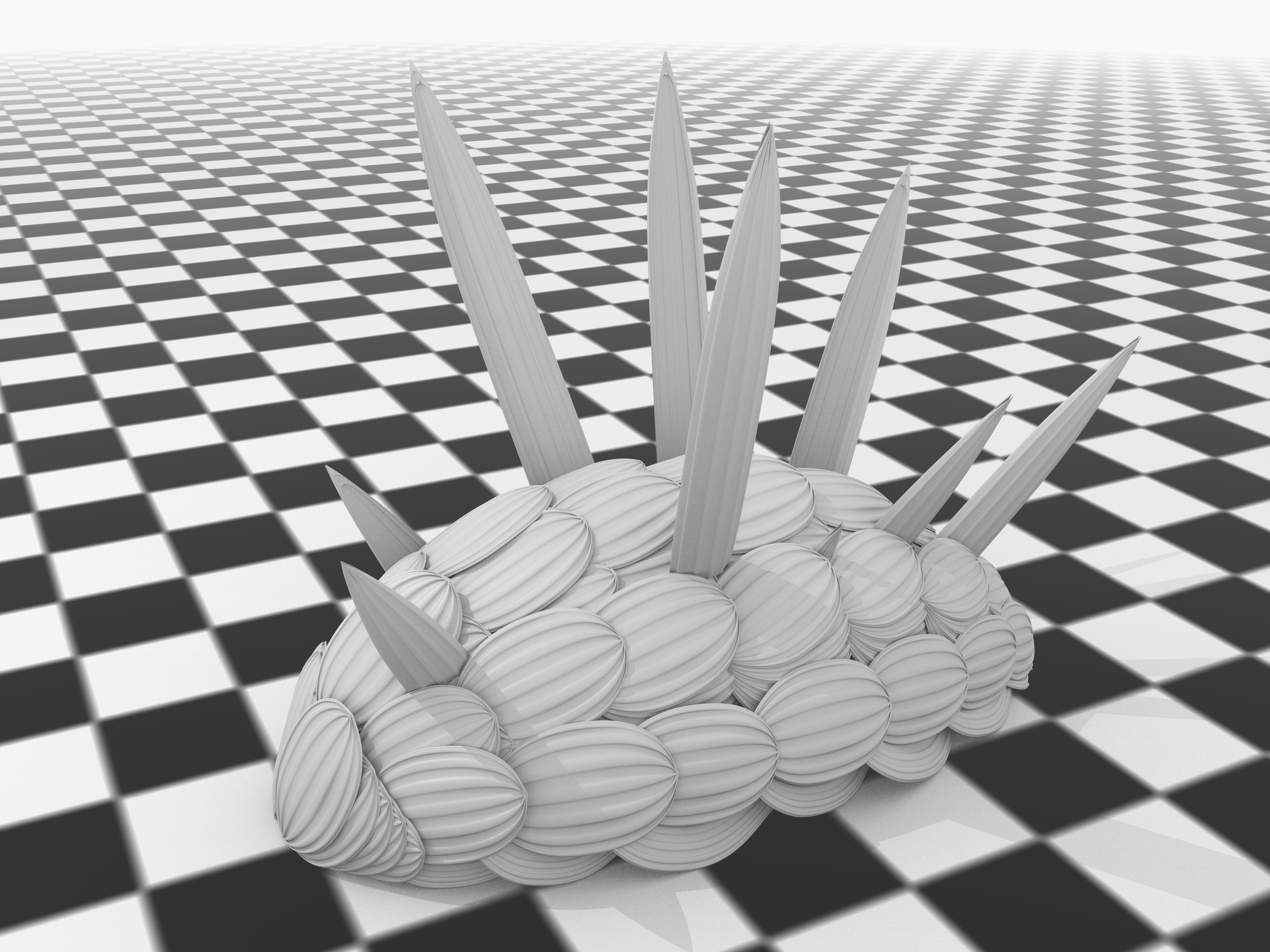
Computer reconstruction of adolescent Wiwaxia corrugata individual. Each checkered square has an area of 1 mm^{2}.

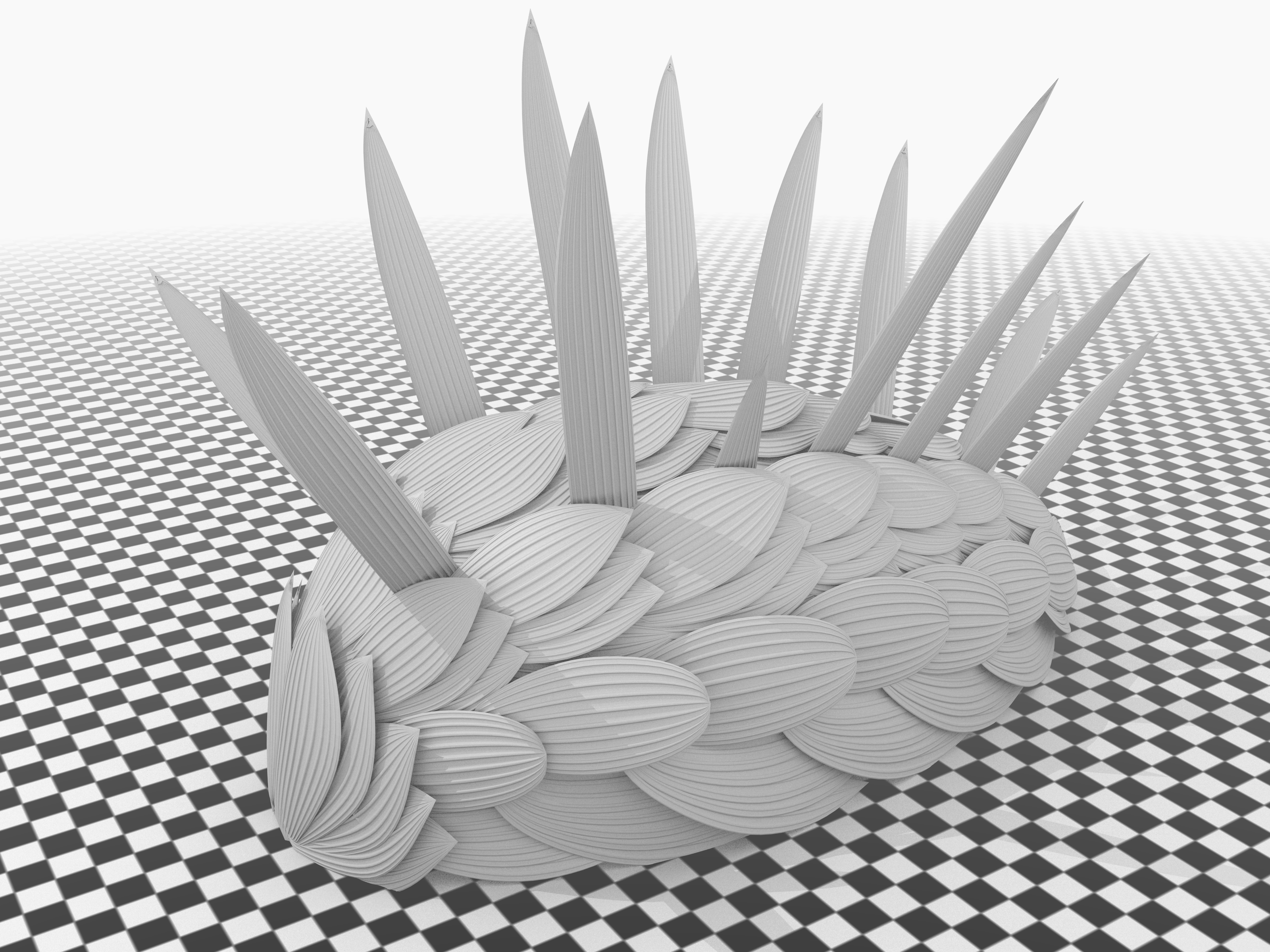
Computer reconstruction of mature Wiwaxia corrugata individual. Each checkered square has an area of 1 mm^{2}.

== Ecology ==
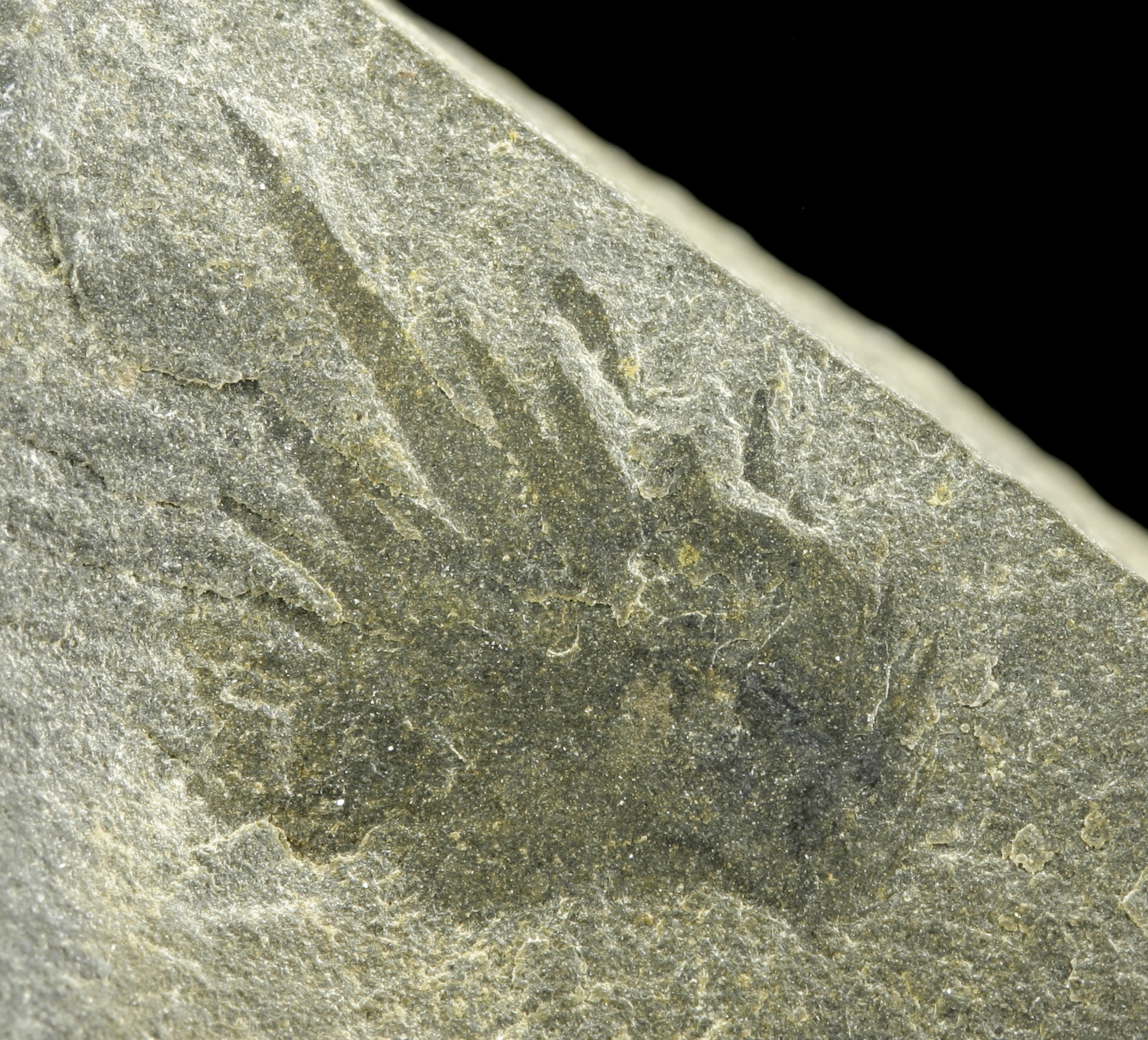
Juvenile Wiwaxia corrugata from the Burgess Shale, viewed side-on; mouthparts are visible to anterior. From Smith (2013)

The long dorsal spines may have been a defense against predators. Wiwaxia apparently moved by contractions of a slug-like foot on its underside. In one specimen a small brachiopod, Diraphora bellicostata, appears to be attached to one of the ventro-lateral sclerites. This suggests that adult Wiwaxia did not burrow or even plough much into the sea-floor as they moved. Two other specimens of Diraphora bellicostata have been found attached to dorsal sclerites. Wiwaxia appears to have been solitary rather than gregarious. The feeding apparatus may have acted as a rasp to scrape bacteria off the top of the microbial mat that covered the sea-floor, or as a rake to gather food particles from the sea-floor.

== Classification ==
During the Cambrian, most of the main groupings of animals recognised today were beginning to diverge. Consequently, many lineages (that would later become extinct) appear intermediate to two or more modern groups, or lack features common to all modern members of a group, and hence fall into the "stem group" of a modern taxon. Debate is ongoing as to whether Wiwaxia can be placed within a modern crown group and, if it cannot, in which group's stem it falls. When Walcott first described Wiwaxia, he regarded it as a polychaete annelid worm, and its sclerites as similar to the elytra ("scales") of annelids. More recently the debate has been intense, and proposed classifications include: a member of an extinct phylum distantly related to the molluscs; a crown-group polychaete; a stem-group annelid; a problematic bilaterian; a stem- or possibly primitive crown-group mollusc.

In 1985, Simon Conway Morris agreed that there were similarities to polychaetes, but considered that Wiwaxia's sclerites were different in construction from annelids' elytra. He was more impressed by the similarities between Wiwaxia's feeding apparatus and a molluscan radula, and assigned the animal to a new taxon Molluscata, which he proposed should also contain the molluscs and hyolithids. When he later described the first fairly complete specimens of Halkieria, he suggested that these were closely related to Wiwaxia.

Nick Butterfield, then a postgraduate paleontologist at Harvard inspired by Stephen Jay Gould's lectures, agreed that the sclerites were not like elytra, which are relatively fleshy and soft. However, since the sclerites were solid, he concluded that Wiwaxia could not be a member of the "Coeloscleritophora", a taxon that had been proposed in order to unite organisms with hollow sclerites, and could not be closely related to the halkieriids, which have hollow sclerites. Instead he thought that they were very similar in several ways to the chitinous bristles (setae) that project from the bodies of modern annelids and in some genera form leaf-like scales that cover the back like roof tiles—in composition, in detailed structure, in how they were attached to the body via "follicles" and in overall appearance. Some modern annelids also develop on each side rows of longer bristles, which both Walcott and Butterfield considered similar to Wiwaxia's dorsal spines. including the halkieriids.

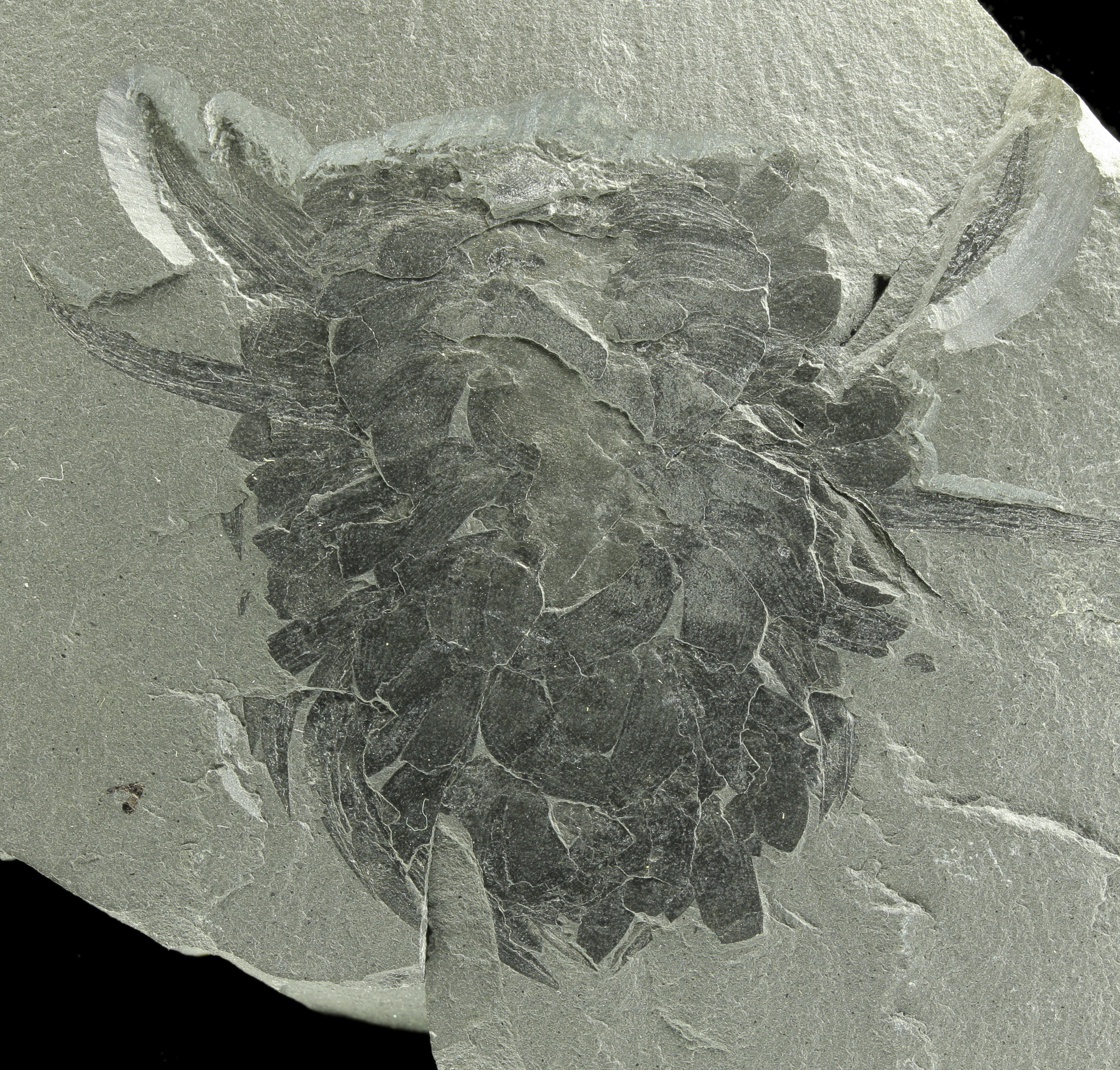
Wiwaxia corrugata from the Burgess Shale. Mouthparts are visible in enlargement. From Smith (2013)

Butterfield also contended that Wiwaxia's feeding apparatus, instead of being mounted in the middle of its "head", was just as likely to be mounted in two parts on the sides of the "head", an arrangement that is common in polychaetes. He went so far as to classify Wiwaxia as a member of a modern order, Phyllodocida, and pointed out that Wiwaxia's lack of obvious segmentation is no barrier to this, as some modern polychaetes also show no segmentation except during development. He later noted that Wiwaxia lack some polychaete features which he would expect to be easily preserved in fossils, and therefore a stem-group annelid, in other words an evolutionary "aunt" of modern annelids.

Conway Morris and Peel (1995) largely accepted Butterfield's arguments and treated Wiwaxia as an ancestor or "aunt" of the polychaetes, and said Butterfield had informed them that the microscopic structure of Wiwaxias sclerites was identical to that of the bristles of two Burgess Shale polychaetes Burgessochaeta and Canadia. Conway Morris and Peel also wrote that one specimen of Wiwaxia showed traces of a small shell, possibly a vestige left over from an earlier stage in the animal's evolution, and noted that one group of modern polychaetes also has what may be a vestigial shell. However, they maintained that Wiwaxia's feeding apparatus was much more like a molluscan radula. They also argued that Wiwaxia was fairly closely related to and in fact descended from the halkieriids, as the sclerites are divided into similar groups, although those of halkieriids were much smaller and more numerous; they also said that in 1994 Butterfield had found Wiwaxia sclerites that were clearly hollow. They presented a large cladogram according to which:

- - Mollusca
  - - "Siberian halkieriid"
    - - - - - Annelida
            - Canadia
          - Wiwaxia
        - Thambetolepis
          (halkieriid)
      - - Halkieria evangelista
        - Brachiopoda

Cladogram: Conway Morris & Peel (1995)
- The earliest halkieriids were a "sister" group to the molluscs, in other words descendants of a fairly closely related common ancestor.
- The halkieriids which Conway Morris had found in Greenland's Sirius Passet lagerstätte were a "sister" group to brachiopods, animals whose modern forms have bivalve shells, but differ from molluscs in having muscular stalks and a distinctive feeding apparatus, the lophophore.
- Another halkieriid genus, Thambetolepis, was a "great aunt" of annelids and Wiwaxia was an "aunt" of annelids.

Marine biologist Amélie H. Scheltema et al. (2003) argued that Wiwaxia's feeding apparatus is very similar to the radulas of some modern shell-less aplacophoran molluscs, and that the sclerites of the two groups are very similar. They concluded that Wiwaxia was a member of a clade that includes molluscs. Scheltema has also highlighted similarities between Wiwaxia and the larvae of certain solenogaster molluscs, which bear iterated calcareous sclerites arranged into three symmetrical lateral zones.

Danish zoologist Danny Eibye-Jacobsen argued in 2004 that Wiwaxia lacks any characters that would firmly place it as a polychaete or annelid. Eibye-Jacobsen regarded bristles as a feature shared by molluscs, annelids and brachiopods. Hence even if Wiwaxia's sclerites closely resembled bristles, which he doubted, this would not prove that Wiwaxia's closest relative was the annelids. He also pointed out that the very different numbers of sclerites in the various zones of Wiwaxia's body do not correspond to any reasonable pattern of segmentation; while Eibye-Jacobsen did not think that this alone would prevent classification of Wiwaxia as a polychaete, he thought it was a serious objection given the lack of other clearly polychaete features. In his opinion there were no strong grounds for classifying Wiwaxia as a proto-annelid or a proto-mollusc, although he thought the objections against classification as a proto-annelid were the stronger.

Butterfield returned to the debate in 2006, repeating the arguments he presented in 1990 for regarding Wiwaxia as an early polychaete and adding that, while bristles are a feature of several groups, they appear as a covering over the back only in polychaetes.

A 2012 study redescribing the mouthparts found a number of similarities with the molluscan radula, and overthrew some of the better arguments for an annelid affinity, seemingly demonstrating that Wiwaxia was indeed a mollusc.

== Occurrence ==
Wiwaxia was originally described by G. F. Matthew in 1899, from an isolated spine that had been found earlier in the Ogyopsis Shale, and classified as "Orthotheca corrugata". Further specimens were found by American paleontologist Charles Doolittle Walcott in 1911 as a result of one of his field trips to the nearby Burgess Shale (Miaolingian, 505 million years ago) in the Canadian Rocky Mountains; he classified it as a member of the polychaete group of annelid worms in its own genus Wiwaxia corrugata, citing similarities to the Aphroditidae and Polynoidae.

In 1966 and 1967, a team led by Harry B. Whittington revisited the Burgess Shale and found so many fossils that it took years to analyze them all. Four hundred and sixty-four complete specimens of Wiwaxia are known from the Greater Phyllopod bed, where they comprise 0.88% of the community. Eventually in 1985 Simon Conway Morris, then a member of Whittington's team, published a detailed description and concluded that Wiwaxia was not a polychaete. All the known specimens came from in and around the Burgess Shale until 1991, when fragmentary fossils were reported from Australia's Georgina Basin. In 2004 additional finds which may represent two different species were reported from the same area.

Articulated specimens are known from Cambrian Stage 3 of Xiaoshiba, China; fragmentary specimens have also been found in the Chengjiang, Cambrian Series 2 deposits in Guizhou, China, and in China's lowermost Miaolingian beds of the Kaili Formation, in the Middle Cambrian beds of the Tyrovice Member, Buchava Formation of the Czech Republic, in the Lower Cambrian Mount Cap formation (Mackenzie Mountains, Canada), in the Emu Bay Shale of Kangaroo Island, South Australia, upper Botomian Stage of the Lower Cambrian, and in the Middle Botomian Sinsk Biota of Siberia, Russia. Isolated sclerites are also common in the small carbonaceous fossil record. Taken together, these finds show that Wiwaxia had a truly cosmopolitan distribution, occurring at all palaeolatitudes and on most palaeocontinents. The Chinese material was originally considered to represent a separate species; like W. corrugata, it possessed spines and regions of sclerites (although it is only known from disarticulated remains), but the sclerites bear a higher density of ribs, and there are two distinct thicknesses of rib (i.e. larger and smaller). At a microscopic level, the sclerites do not differ from Burgess Shale or Mount Cap sclerites, but the Chinese material seems to have developed spines from an early age, distinguishing it from the W. corrugata. The knob-bearing sclerites from all three localities seem to belong to a different species, and a further species is represented in the Xiaoshiba deposits. What is surprising is the limited variety exhibited between species: all have a fundamentally equivalent scleritome, displaying a notable degree of morphological stasis for some 15 Ma.

Isolated spines are more common than sclerites in localities with a poor preservation potential, suggesting that the spines were more recalcitrant (or more commonly collected); however, in well-preserved sites such as the Phyllopod bed, spine and sclerite abundance is comparable, in disarticulated instances, to the proportions on complete fossils.

Younger spines of possible wiwaxiid origin have been observed from the Valongo Formation (Middle Ordovician: Dapingian-Darriwilian) of northern Portugal and have been reported, if not described, from the Fezouata Biota.

== See also ==
- Coeloscleritophoran
- Paleobiota of the Burgess Shale
- Paleobiota of the Maotianshan Shales
