= Oikozetetes =

Oikozetetes Temporal range: Lower Cambrian–Middle Cambrian

Scientific classification
- Kingdom: Animalia
- Phylum: incertae sedis
- Genus: †Oikozetetes
- Species: †O. seilacheri

Binomial name
- †Oikozetetes seilacheri Conway Morris 1995

Extinct genus of animals

Oikozetetes is a genus of halkeriid known only from two types of cap-shaped shell found in the Burgess Shale and dated to about 505 million years ago. The two types are thought to be front and rear shells. They were probably calcareous while the organism was alive (although diagenesis sometimes replaces the original mineral with another, such as silica). It is thought to also have borne an armour coat consisting of biomineralised sclerites, like Halkieria. These are never found in direct association with the shells, but there are many biostratinomic processes which could account for this fact.

The lower Cambrian taxon Ocruranus (=Eohalobia) is putatively equivalent to the shells of Oikozetetes and seemingly belonged to a halkieriid-type body, although an intermediate valve suggests a Palaeoloricate-like body form.
