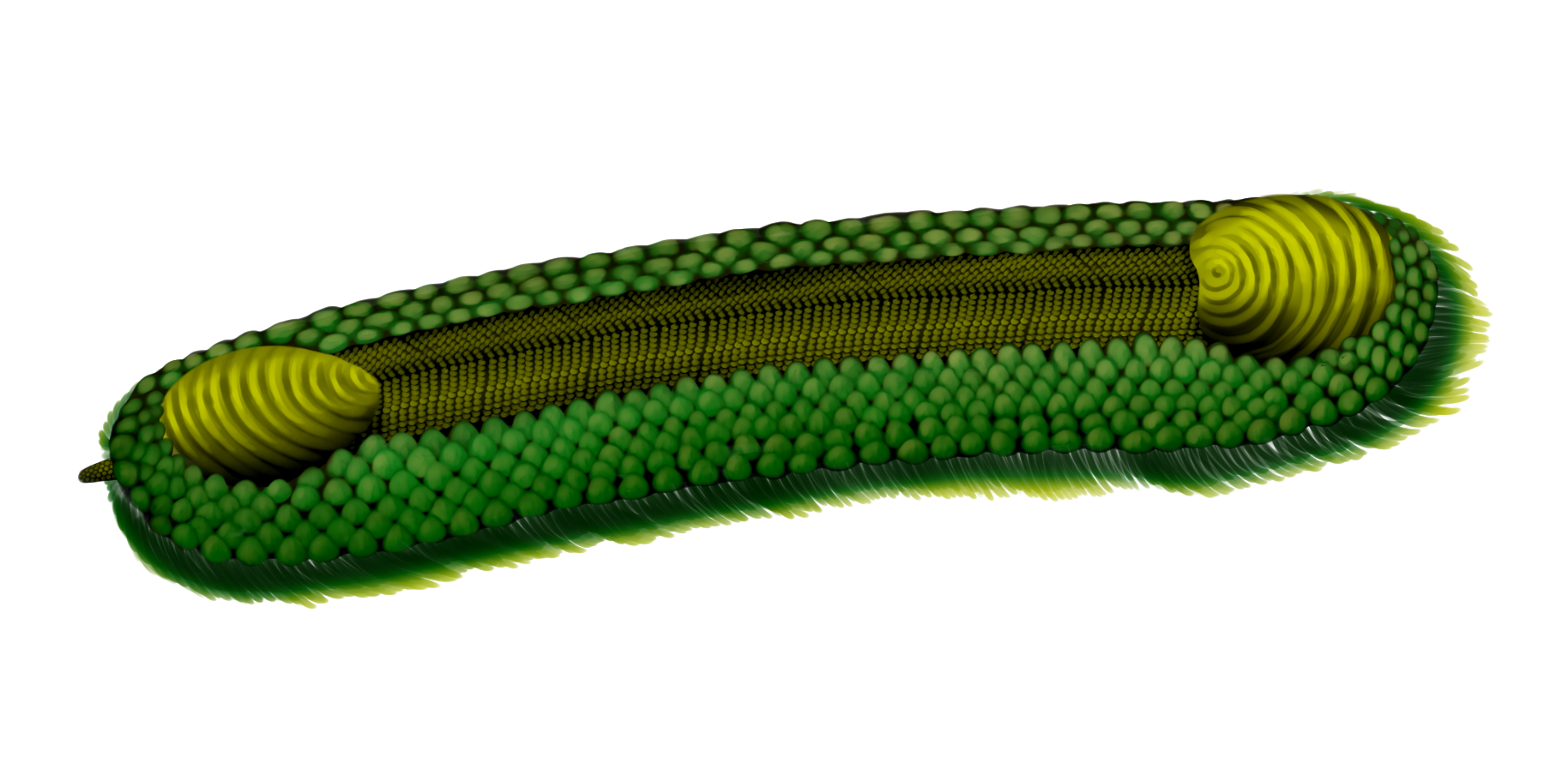
- Life restoration of Halkieria evangelista

Scientific classification
- Kingdom: Animalia
- Phylum: Mollusca
- Family: †Halkieriidae; Poulsen, 1967

Genera
- †Halkieria; †Australohalkieria; †Oikozetetes; †Orthrozanclidae

= Halkieriid =

Halkieriidae Temporal range: Lower-Middle Cambrian

Family of extinct molluscs

The halkieriids are a group of fossil organisms from the Lower to Middle Cambrian. Their eponymous genus is Halkieria /hælˈkɪəriə/.

The group is sometimes equated to Sachitida, although as originally envisaged, this group includes the wiwaxiids and is thus equivalent to the Halwaxiida.

== Occurrence ==
Halkieriids in context
← / Last Ediacaran communities; ← / Burgess Shale; ← / Sirius Passet Fauna; ← / Chengjiang Fauna; ← / First Trilobites; ← / First Arthropod trace fossils; ← / Claimed bilaterian trace fossils; ← / and Echinoderms; ← / Small shelly fauna; ← / Halkieriids; ← / Cambrian explosion, if sudden
Neoproterozoic (last era of the Precambrian); Palaeozoic (first era of the Phanerozoic)
Axis scale: millions of years ago. References for dates: To be completed

The only reasonably complete specimens, of Halkieria evangelista, were found in the Sirius Passet lagerstätte in Greenland. Fragments which are confidently classified as belonging to halkieriids have been found in China's Xinjiang province and Australia's Georgina Basin, while shells of a possible halkieriid have been found in Canada's Burgess Shale. Halkieriid-like armor plates, called "sclerites" have been found in many other places as part of the small shelly fauna.

The earliest known occurrences of Halkieriids sclerites, classified as Halkieria longa, date from the Purella antiqua Zone of the Upper Nemakit-Daldynian Stage in Siberia. The mass extinction at the end of the Cambrian period's Botomian age was thought to have wiped out most of the small shellies, including the halkieriids, but in 2004 Halkieriid fossils classified as Australohalkieria were reported from Mid-Cambrian rocks of the Georgina Basin in Australia. It is not known why this clade would have survived while other halkieriid clades apparently died. It may be significant that the only archaeocyathans known to have survived the end-Botomian extinction also occur in Gondwana, the old super-continent that embraced South America, Africa, India, Australia and Antarctica.

Halkieriids and other small shelly fossils are typically, although not always, preserved in phosphate, which may or may not have been their original mineral composition. Preservation by a covering of phosphate only seems to have been common during the early Cambrian, becoming rarer with time as a result of increased disturbance of sea-floors by burrowing animals. Hence it is possible that halkieriids and other small shelly fossils were alive earlier than the earliest known fossils and later than the latest known fossils — paleontologists call this kind of uncertainty the Signor–Lipps effect.

== Phylogenetic position of halkieriids ==
The evolutionary relationships of the halkieriids are a complex topic which is still being debated. Most of this debate is about their relationship to Wiwaxia and to the three major lophotrochozoan phyla — molluscs, annelids and brachiopods. The question of their relationship to an apparently much more primitive Cambrian group, the chancelloriids is also significant and may raise some difficult questions.

=== Relationship to molluscs, annelids and brachiopods ===
- - Siphogonuchitidae
  - - MOLLUSCA
      (crown group)
    - - "Siberian halkieriid"
      - - - - - ANNELIDA
                (crown group)
              - Canadia
            - Wiwaxia
          - Thambetolepis
            (halkieriid)
        - - Halkieria evangelista
          - BRACHIOPODA
            (crown group)

Cladogram: Conway Morris & Peel (1995)

In 1995 Conway Morris and Peel presented a cladogram based both on the fossils' features and on early 1990s research in molecular phylogeny, which is the application of cladistic analysis to DNA and RNA:

- The siphogonuchitids, a group found in Earliest Cambrian rocks, were the "sister" group to all the rest. These are known only from isolated fragments.
- The earliest halkieriids were a "sister" group to the molluscs, in other words descendants of a fairly closely related common ancestor. This relationship, they said, was supported by the muscular foot that most researchers assumed halkieriids had.
- Another halkieriid genus, Thambetolepis / Sinosachites, was a "great aunt" of annelids and Wiwaxia was an "aunt" of annelids. Their claim of a close relationship between halkieriids and Wiwaxia was based on both groups' having sclerites divided into three concentric zones. The close relationship of Wiwaxia to annelids was based on the similarities Butterfield (1990) found between Wiwaxia's sclerites and the bristles of polychaete annelids. Canadia is a Burgess Shale fossil that is widely agreed to be a polychaete.
- Halkieria evangelista, which Conway Morris had found in Greenland's Sirius Passet lagerstätte, was a "sister" group" to brachiopods, animals whose modern forms have bivalve shells but differ from molluscs in having muscular stalks and a distinctive feeding apparatus, the lophophore. Brachiopods have bristles that are similar to those of annelids and hence to Wiwaxia's sclerites, and hence to halkieriid sclerites. A brachiopod affinity seemed plausible because brachiopods pass through a larval phase that resembles a halkieriid, and some isolated fossil shells thought to belong to halkieriids had a brachiopod-like microstructure.

In 2003 Cohen, Holmer and Luter supported the halkieriid-brachiopod relationship, suggesting that brachiopods may have arisen from a halkieriid lineage that developed a shorter body and larger shells, and then folded itself and finally grew a stalk out of what used to be the back.

Vinther and Nielsen (2005) proposed instead that Halkieria was a crown group mollusc, in other words more similar to modern molluscs that to annelids, brachiopods or any intermediate groups. They argued that: Halkieria's sclerites resembled those of the modern solenogaster aplacophoran shell-less molluscs (see Scheltema, A. H.; Ivanov, D. L. (2002). "An aplacophoran postlarva with iterated dorsal groups of spicules and skeletal similarities to Paleozoic fossils". Invertebrate Biology. 121: 1–10. Bibcode:2002InvBi.121....1S. doi:10.1111/j.1744-7410.2002.tb00124.x.), of some modern polyplacophoran molluscs, which have several shell plates, and of the Ordovician polyplacophoran Echinochiton; Halkieria's shells are more similar to the shells of conchiferan molluscs, since shells of both of these groups show no trace of the canals and pores seen in polyplacophoran shell plates; the bristles of brachiopods and annelids are similar to each other but not to Halkieria's sclerites.

- - ANNELIDA
  - - ? Kimberella
    - - Odontogriphus
      - - - - Wiwaxia
            - - Halkieriids
              - MOLLUSCA
                (crown group)

Cladogram: Caron, Scheltema, et al. (2006)

Caron, Scheltema, Schander and Rudkin (2006) also interpreted Halkieria as a crown group mollusc, with Wiwaxia and Odontogriphus as stem group molluscs, in other words "sister" and "aunt" of the crown group molluscs. Their main reason for regarding Halkieria as crown group molluscs is that both possessed armor mineralized with calcium carbonate. They treated Wiwaxia and Odontogriphus as stem group molluscs because in their opinion both possessed the distinctive molluscan radula, a chitinous toothed "tongue".

Also in 2006, Conway Morris criticized Vinther and Nielsen's (2005) classification of Halkieria as a crown group mollusc, on the grounds that the growth of the spicules in the aplacophorans and polyplacophorans is not similar to the method of growth deduced for the complex halkieriid sclerites; in particular, he said, the hollow spines of various molluscs are not at all like the halkieriid sclerites with their complex internal channels. Conway Morris repeated his earlier conclusion that halkieriids were close to the ancestors of both molluscs and brachiopods.

Butterfield (2006) accepted that Wiwaxia and Odontogriphus were closely related, but argued that they were stem-group polychaetes rather than stem-group molluscs. In his opinion the feeding apparatus of these organisms, which consisted of two or at most four rows of teeth, could not perform the functions of the "belt-like" molluscan radula with their numerous tooth-rows; the different tooth-rows in both Wiwaxia and Odontogriphus tooth-rows also have noticeably different shapes, while those of molluscan radulae are produced one after the other by the same group of "factory" cells and therefore are almost identical. He also regarded lines running across the middle region of Odontogriphus fossils as evidence of external segmentation, since the lines are evenly spaced and run exactly at right angles to the long axis of the body. As in his earlier papers, Butterfield emphasized the similarities of internal structure between Wiwaxia's sclerites and the bristles of polychaetes, and the fact that polychaetes are the only modern organisms in which some of the bristles form a covering over the back.

Conway Morris and Caron (2007) published the first description of Orthrozanclus reburrus. This resembled the halkieriids in having concentric bands of sclerites, although only two and not mineralized; and one shell at what was presumed to be the front and which was similar in shape to Halkieria's front shell. It also had long spines rather like those of Wiwaxia. Conway Morris and Caron regarded this creature as evidence that the "halwaxiids" were a valid taxon and were monophyletic, in other words shared a common ancestor with each other and with no other organism. They published two cladograms, representing alternative hypotheses about the evolution of the lophotrochozoa, the lineage that includes molluscs, annelids and brachiopods:

- - - Kimberella
    - - Odontogriphus
      - - - Wiwaxia
          - - Siphogonuchitidae
            - - Orthrozanclus
              - Halkieriids
        - - MOLLUSCA
            (crown group)
  - - - Canadia
      - ANNELIDA
        (crown group)
    - - Micrina
      - BRACHIOPODA
        (crown group)

- - Kimberella
  - - Odontogriphus
    - - MOLLUSCA
        (crown group)
      - - - Siphogonuchitidae
          - - Halkieriids
            - - Orthrozanclus
              - Wiwaxia
        - - - Canadia
            - ANNELIDA
              (crown group)
          - - Micrina
            - BRACHIOPODA
              (crown group)

Two alternative cladograms: Conway Morris and Caron (2007)
1. This is the more likely, although it falls apart if the organisms' characteristics are changed even slightly:
  - Kimberella and Odontogriphus are early, primitive molluscs, without sclerites or any kind of mineralized armor.
  - Wiwaxia, the siphogonuchitids, Orthrozanclus and Halkieria from a side-branch of the mollusc family tree, which diverged in that order. This would mean that: Wiwaxia was the first of them to have sclerites, which were unmineralized; the siphogonuchitids were the first to have mineralized sclerites, although the scleritome was simpler; halkieriids then develop more complex scleritomes, while in Orthrozanclus the scleritome became unmineralized again and the rear shell vanished or became so small that it has not been seen in fossils. This hypothesis faces the difficulty that siphogonuchitids appear in earlier rocks and have simpler scleritomes than the other three groups.
  - The annelids and brachiopods evolved from the other main branch of the family tree, which did not include the molluscs.
2. The alternative view is:
  - Kimberella and Odontogriphus are early, primitive lophotrochozoans.
  - The siphogonuchitids, Halkieria, Orthrozanclus and Wiwaxia form a group that is closer to the shared ancestor of annelids and brachiopods than it is to the molluscs. The siphogonuchitids are the first of the group to become distinctive, with two types of mineralized sclerites and a "shell" made of fused sclerites. Halkieriids had three types of sclerites and two one-piece shells. In Orthrozanclus the sclerites became unmineralized and in Wiwaxia the shells were lost.

The network of internal cavities within sclerites of the halkieriid Sinosachites have been likened to the aesthete canals in polyplacophora, strengthening the case for a molluscan affinity. As the animals grew, the shell plates grew by adding material to the outer edges.

=== Relationship to chancelloriids ===
Porter (2008) revived an early 1980s idea that the sclerites of Halkieria are extremely similar to those of chancelloriids. These were sessile, bag-like, radially symmetric organisms with an opening at the top.

Since their fossils show no signs of a gut or other organs, they were originally classified as some kind of sponge. Butterfield and Nicholas (1996) argued that they were closely related to sponges on the grounds that the detailed structure of chancellorid sclerites is similar to that of fibers of spongin, a collagen protein, in modern keratose (horny) demosponges. However Janussen, Steiner and Zhu (2002) opposed this view, arguing that: spongin does not appear in all Porifera, but may be a defining feature of the demosponges; the silica-based spines of demosponges are solid, while chancellorid sclerites are hollow and filled with soft tissues connected to the rest of the animal at the bases of the sclerites; chancellorid sclerites were probably made of aragonite, which is not found in demosponges; sponges have loosely bound-together skins called pinacoderms, which are only one cell thick, while the skins of chancellorids were much thicker and shows signs of connective structures called belt desmosomes. In their opinion the presence of belt desmosomes made chancellorids members of the Epitheliazoa, the next higher taxon above the Porifera, to which sponges belong. They thought it was difficult to say whether chancellorids were members of the Eumetazoa, "true animals" whose tissues are organized into Germ layers: chancellorids' lack of internal organs would seem to exclude them from the Eumetazoa; but possibly chancellorids descended from Eumetazoans that lost these features after becoming sessile filter-feeders. There are intriguing hints that the Ediacaran genus Ausia may represent a halkieriid ancestor with strong similarity to the chancelloriids.

The coelosclerites ("hollow sclerites") of halkieriids and chancelloriids resemble each other at all levels: both have an internal "pulp cavity" and a thin external organic layer; the walls are made of the same material, aragonite; the arrangement of the aragonite fibers is in each is the same, running mainly from base to tip but with each being closer to the surface at the end nearest the tip. It is extremely improbable that totally unrelated organisms could have developed such similar sclerites independently, but the huge difference in the structures of their bodies makes it hard to see how they could be closely related. This dilemma may be resolved in various ways:

- One possibility is that chancelloriids evolved from bilaterian ancestors but then adopted a sessile lifestyle and rapidly lost all unnecessary features. However the gut and other internal organs have not been lost in other bilaterians that lost their external bilateral symmetry, such as echinoderms, priapulids, and kinorhynchs.
- On the other hand, perhaps chancelloriids are similar to the organisms from which bilaterians evolved. That would imply that the earliest bilaterians had similar coelosclerites. However, there are no fossils of such sclerites before 542 million years ago, while Kimberella from 555 million years ago was almost certainly a bilaterian, but shows no evidence of sclerites.
- One solution to this dilemma may be that preservation of small shelly fossils by coatings of phosphate was common only for a relatively short time, during the Early Cambrian, and that coelosclerite-bearing organisms were alive several million years before and after the time of phosphatic preservation. In fact there are over 25 cases of phosphatic preservation between 542 million years ago and 521 million years ago, but only one between 555 million years ago and 542 million years ago.
- Alternatively, perhaps the common ancestor of both chancelloriids and halkieriids had very similar but unmineralized coelosclerites, and some intermediate groups independently incorporated aragonite into these very similar structures.

== See also ==
- Coeloscleritophoran
