= Australohalkieria =

Australohalkieria Temporal range: Early Middle Cambrian, Botomian

Scientific classification
- Kingdom: Animalia
- Clade: Spiralia
- Superphylum: Lophotrochozoa
- Phylum: Mollusca
- Family: †Halkieriidae
- Genus: †Australohalkieria; Porter, 2004

Type species
- Australohalkieria parva Bengtson et al., 1990

Otherpecies
- †A. superstes Porter, 2004

Synonyms
- Halkieria parva Bengtson et al. 1990

Extinct genus of slug-like animals

Australohalkieria (meaning "southern Halkieria") is an extinct genus of halkieriid from Australia and Antarctica.

== Description ==
=== Australohalkieria superstes ===
This species, named by Porter in 2004, is the most complete and abundant Australian halkieriid species. The sclerites assigned to this species are convex on the upper surface and concave on the lower. They may also curve within their own plane, and they overlap so that the concave side of each is partly covered by the convex side of the next one. The internal cavity within Australohalkieria is more complicated that the simple tube in Halkieria; about half-way up the sclerite, the cylindrical tube splits into a pair of longitudinal canals, with the central canal flattening; the canals don't seem to be connected. The walls also have a different microscopic structure.

In A. superstes the central canals of sclerites are flattened on their upper surfaces, and this produces a depression on the upper surface of the tip. The surface of this depression is not mineralized, which suggests the depression may have helped the animals' sense of smell by letting chemicals in the water penetrate the exposed skin. The phosphatic coating on sclerites of A. superstes has features that suggest they were originally covered by a thin organic skin. An outer organic layer has also been found on sclerites of the chancelloriids, sessile organisms that are thought to have looked rather like cacti. If halkieriids were early molluscs, the outer layers of the sclerites may have been similar to the periostracum of some modern molluscs.

The sclerites of A. superstes have right- and left-handed variants which are equally abundant, which suggests that A. superstes was bilaterally symmetrical. All of the sclerites were tiny: the palmates ones ranged from 250 micrometres (0.0098 in) to 650 micrometres (0.026 in) in length, and the cultrates from 300 micrometres (0.012 in) to 1,000 micrometres (0.039 in). The siculates fall into two groups: those with a shallow S-curve at the base, which range from 400 micrometres (0.016 in) to 1,000 micrometres (0.039 in) in length, and often have a slight twist at the base; and those with a 45° and 90° bend at the base and are 400 micrometres (0.016 in) to 500 micrometres (0.020 in) long.

Scleritomes of Early Cambrian halkieriids have many more palmate and cultrate than siculate sclerites. On the other hand, siculate sclerites of A. superstes are more abundant than either cultrate or palmate sclerites; in fact palmate sclerites are rare. Possibly some process after death removed many of the palmates and some of the cultrates, but it is more likely that in A. superstes the part of the scleritome, or "coat of mail", closest to the sea-bed was larger relative to the lateral and dorsal zones further up and towards the center. A. superstes sclerites are also about one-third the size of Early Cambrian halkieriid sclerites. Since the Georgina assemblage includes larger fossils and most Early Cambrian halkieriids are preserved by the same method, phosphatization, it is unlikely that preservational bias has produced an unrepresentative sample. Possible explanations for the small size of A. superstes sclerites include: the individuals represented in the Georgina assemblage were juveniles; their scleritomes were composed of many more sclerites than those of Early Cambrian halkieriids; or the species itself was relatively small.

No shells that might be assigned to halkieriids have been found in the Georgina Basin. This does not prove that Australohalkieria lacked shells, as shells of Halkieria are rarely found.

=== Australohalkieria parva ===
This species was first described in 1990. Like A. superstes, its sclerites have undivided longitudinal canals and a very similar structure to their walls wall, but A. parva has sclerites whose central canals are not flattened.

=== Other halkieriid fossils from Australia ===
The other sclerites from the Georgina Basin are different enough to be excluded from Australohalkieria superstes, but are not sufficiently abundant to provide enough detail for them to be classified. One type is very similar to those of A.superstes, even having a two-pronged tip, but the middle canal is not flattened. The other has a flattened central canal and no longitudinal canals, and may represent an additional Middle Cambrian halkieriid genus, distinct from Australohalkieria and from the Early Cambrian Halkieria.

== Features shared by Halkieria and Australohalkieria ==
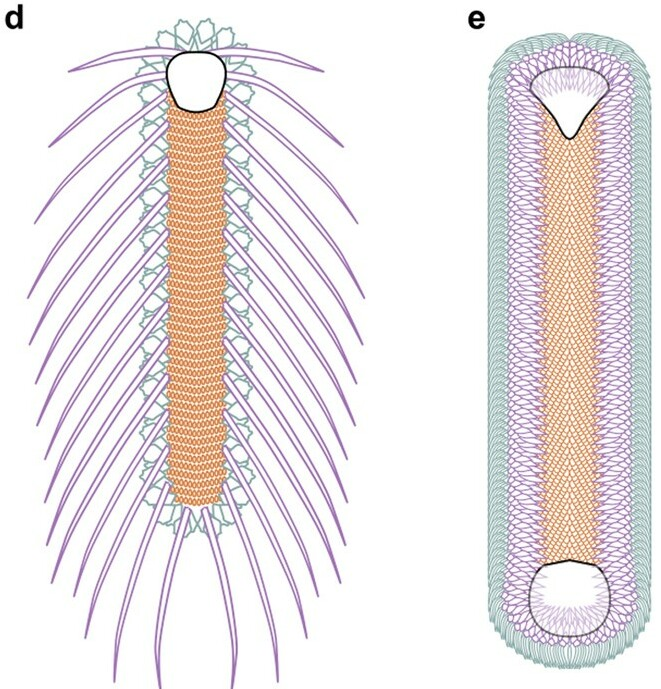
Comparison of Orthrozanclus (left) and Halkieria (right)

Only armor-like sclerites of Australohalkieria have been found, and much of the analysis assumes that these animals were similar to Halkieria. However the sclerites are so similar that this assumption looks fairly safe. In both genera the sclerites are of the type called "coelosclerites", which have a mineralized shell around a space originally filled with organic tissue, and which show no evidence of growth by adding material round the outside. Both genera also have sclerites of three different shapes: "palmate", flat and shaped rather like a maple leaf, which are generally the smallest; "cultrate", flat but shaped like knife blades; and "siculate", which are about the same size as the cultrates but are spine-shaped and like rather squashed cylinders. In both Halkieria and Australohalkieria the palmate and cultrate sclerites have prominent ribs, and are fairly flat except for 90° bends at the bases, which indicate that they fitted snugly against the animals' bodies. The siculates mostly lack ribs and appear to have projected away from the body at angles between about 45° and 90°.
