= Micrina =

Scientific classification
- Kingdom: Animalia
- Order: Tommotiida
- Genus: †Micrina; Laurie, 1986

Type species
- Platyceras etheridgei Tate, 1892

Species
- M. etheridgei; M. pusilla; M. ridicula; M. xiaotanensis

Genus of brachiopods (fossil)

Micrina is an extinct genus of tommotiids with affinities to brachiopods.

Micrina can be considered a stem group brachiopod based on its larval shell.

Its microstructure is very brachiopod like and its adult morphology is similarly bivalved, even though it was once thought to be halkieriid-like.

Micrina is quite similar to Mickwitzia in terms of shell microstructure. The two genera are evidently closely related.

== Species ==
- M. etheridgei (Tate, 1892)
- M. pusilla Gravestock et al., 2001
- M. ridicula (Barskova, 1988)
- M. xiaotanensis Li & Xiao, 2004
