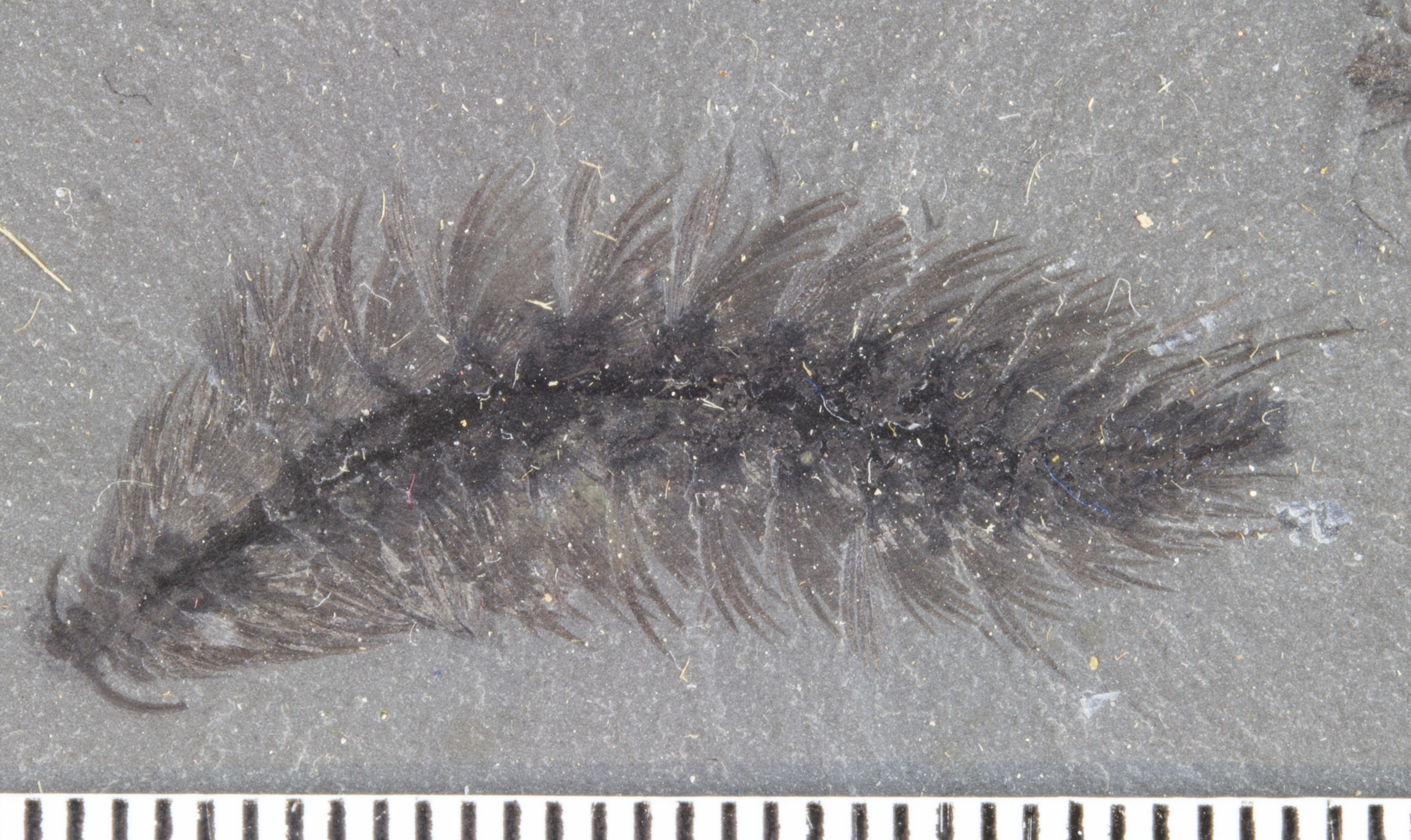
- Fossil of Canadia spinosa

Scientific classification
- Kingdom: Animalia
- Phylum: Annelida
- Class: Polychaeta
- Genus: †Canadia; Walcott, 1911
- Species: †C. spinosa

Binomial name
- †Canadia spinosa Walcott, 1911

= Canadia spinosa =

Canadia spinosa Temporal range: 508–505 Ma

Species of annelid (fossil)

Canadia (meaning of Canada or after Canada) is a genus of extinct annelid worm present in Burgess Shale type Konservat-Lagerstätte. It is found in strata dating back to the Delamaran stage of the Middle Cambrian around 505 million years ago, during the time of the Cambrian explosion. It was about 3 centimeters (1.2 inches) in length. Charles Doolittle Walcott named Canadia in 1911 after Canada, the country from which its remains have been found. 28 specimens of Canadia are known from the Greater Phyllopod bed, where they comprise 0.05% of the community.

== Description ==
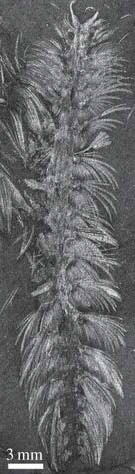

With length up to 4.5 centimeters (1.8 inches), the animal's most notable feature is the many notosetae (rigid setae extending from dorsal branches of notopodia) along the back of the animal that are characteristic of polychaete worms. A 1998 paper suggested that it may have been iridescent due to the supposed presence of diffraction gratings, however other studies have interpreted these structures as internal microvilli.

Tentacles extended from the prostomium and may have served as sensory organs. The gut of Canadia was straight and had the ability to extend out of the body in the form of a proboscis, suggesting that the animal was carnivorous. This is further evidenced by the lack of sediments found in the gut that would be present in a benthic detritivore. Canadia is thought to have swum above the seafloor as a primary means of locomotion by beating its numerous notosetae.

It would also have had the ability to creep along the seafloor using the ventral counterpart of the notopodia, which are termed neuropodia (in reference to the proximity to the paired, ventral nerve cords characteristic of annelids).

== Classification ==
There has been some debate as to the placement of Canadia within the Annelida phylum. Although it is commonly accepted to be within Annelida, it is uncertain how it relates to modern annelids. Most paleontologists agree that it belongs to the class Polychaeta due in part to the presence of parapodia. It has been proposed to be a member of the order Phyllodocida along with Wiwaxia, another organism from the Burgess Shale. Both were placed in a new superfamily called Canadiacea, and were thought to be of closer relationship to each other than to modern annelids. However, Wiwaxia is no longer believed to have been an annelid and there is currently dispute as to whether or not Canadia should be classified as belonging to anything more derived than Polychaeta.

== See also ==
- Paleobiota of the Burgess Shale
