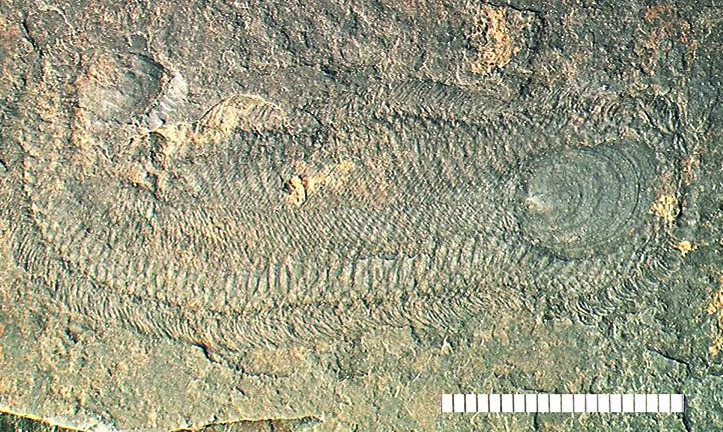
- Halkieria evangelista from the Lower Cambrian Sirius Passet, North Greenland
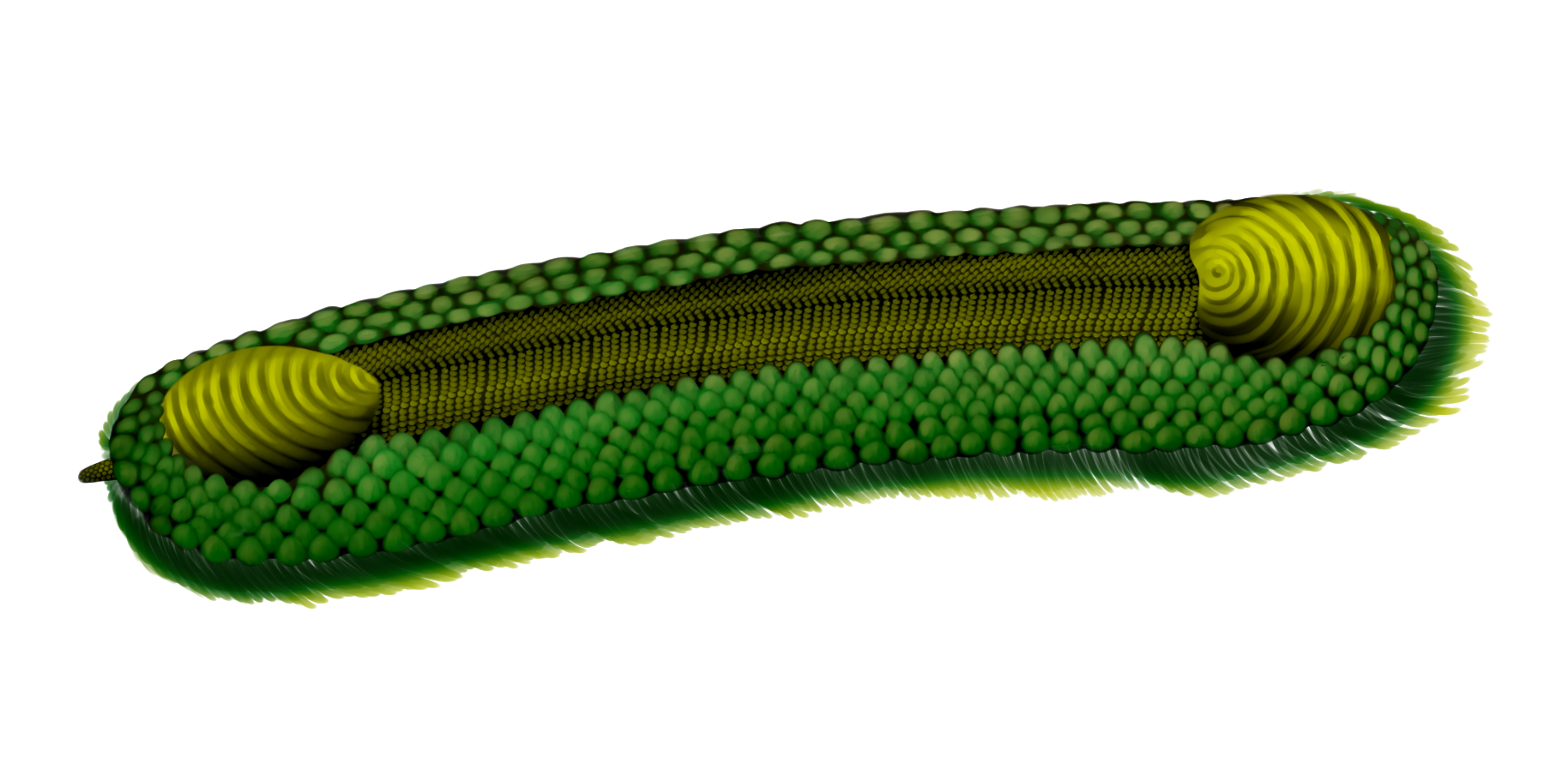
- Life restoration

Scientific classification
- Kingdom: Animalia
- Phylum: Mollusca
- Family: †Halkieriidae
- Genus: †Halkieria; Poulsen, 1967

Type species
- Halkieria obliqua Poulsen, 1967

Species
- See text

= Halkieria =

Halkieria Temporal range: Lower to Middle Cambrian

Fossil genus of molluscs

Halkieria /hælˈkɪəriə/ is a genus of halkieriid mollusc which has been found on almost every continent in Lower to Mid Cambrian deposits, forming a large component of the small shelly fossil assemblages. The best known species is Halkieria evangelista, from the North Greenland Sirius Passet Lagerstätte, in which complete specimens were collected on an expedition in 1989. The fossils were described by Simon Conway Morris and John Peel in a short paper in 1990 in the journal Nature. Later a more thorough description was undertaken in 1995 in the journal Philosophical Transactions of the Royal Society of London and wider evolutionary implications were posed.

== History of discovery ==
Armor plates called "sclerites" had long been known as elements of the small shelly fossils, and detailed analysis showed that some of these belonged to the same animal and how they fitted together. The first articulated specimens of Halkieria evangelista, with all their hard parts together, were collected in 1989 from the Sirius Passet lagerstätte in Greenland, and were described in 1990 by Simon Conway Morris and John S. Peel. H. evangelista is used as a model for identifying and reconstructing as halkieriids other similar shells and sclerites; its epithet evangelista reflects its power to explain the Lower Cambrian fossil record.

== Description ==
Halkieria sclerite zones
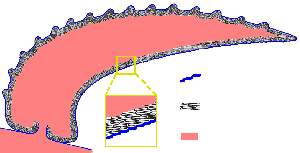
Halkieriid sclerite structure

The animals looked like slugs in chain mail - 1.5 centimetres (0.59 in) to 8 centimetres (3.1 in) long, bilaterally symmetric, flattened from top to bottom and unarmored on the bottom. Very near each end there is a shell plate with prominent growth lines rather like the growth rings of trees. The rest of the upper surface was covered with about 2,000 sclerites that overlapped each other like tiles and formed three zones with sclerites of different shapes: "palmates", shaped rather like maple leaves, ran along the center of the back between the shell plates; blade-shaped "cultrates" lay on either side of the palmates and pointing towards the middle of the upper surface; and slim, sickle-shaped "siculates" covered the outer edges. The sclerites bore a wide central cavity, and (at least in some specimens) finer lateral canals. As the animals grew, the shell plates grew by adding material to the outer edges. Individual sclerites stayed the same size; since the cultrate sclerites form a pattern that is constant in all fairly complete specimens, the old ones that were too small may have been shed and replaced by larger ones as the animals grew. The sclerites seem to have grown by basal secretion. There are traces of thin ribs between the sclerites and the skin.

The shellplates and the sclerites were probably made of calcium carbonate originally; it has been suggested on the basis of how they were preserved that they may have been wholly organic, but this is less likely since fossils of non-calcified organisms are usually thin films while Halkeieria fossils are three-dimensional like those of trilobites and hyoliths - in fact several specimens show curvature in the horizontal plane, which suggests that the muscles associated with the sclerites were still present at the time of burial

The sole was soft and probably muscular. Since Halkieria was unsuited to swimming and had no obvious adaptations for burrowing, it must have lived on the sea-floor, "walking" by making its muscular sole ripple. The backward-projecting siculate sclerites may have improved its grip by preventing it from slipping backwards. Some specimens have been found partially rolled up, rather like a pillbug, and in this position the cultrate sclerites projected outwards, which probably deterred predators. It is difficult to determine the functions of the cap-shaped shells at either end of the animal, as the sclerites appear to have offered adequate protection. Scars on the inner surface of the front shell may indicate that it provided an attachment for internal organs. In one specimen the rear shell appears to have rotated by about 45° before fossilization, which suggests there was a cavity underneath, which may have housed gills.

Traces of a gut have been found in the rear halves of some fossils. Parts of one specimen have been interpreted as a radula, the toothed chitinous tongue that is the signature feature of molluscs, but in this specimen the edge of the "scleritome", i.e. coat of sclerites, is folded and the putative radula could be a group of dislocated siculate sclerites.

== Species ==
Nearly all members of the genera Halkieria are known only from finds of isolated scaly sclerites:

- Halkieria alata Duan, 1984
- Halkieria amorpha Meshkova,1974
- Halkieria bisulcata Qian et Yin, 1984
- Halkieria costulata Meshkova, 1974
- Halkieria curvativa Mambetov in Missarzhevsky and Mambetov, 1981
- Halkieria deplanatiformis Mambetov in Missarzhevsky and Mambetov, 1981
- Halkieria desquamata Duan, 1984
- Halkieria directa Mostler, 1980
- Halkieria elonga Qian et Yin, 1984
- Halkieria equilateralis Qian et Yin, 1984
- Halkieria folliformis Duan, 1984
- Halkieria fordi Landing, 1991
- Halkieria hexagona Mostler, 1980
- Halkieria lata Mostler, 1980
- Halkieria longa Qian, 1977
- Halkieria longispinosa Mostler, 1980
- Halkieria maidipingensis Qian, 1977
- Halkieria mina Qian, Chen et Chen, 1979
- Halkieria mira Qian et Xiao, 1984
- Halkieria obliqua Poulsen, 1967
- Halkieria operculus Qian, 1984
- ?Halkieria pennata He, 1981 [=?Halkieria sthenobasis Jiang in Luo et al., 1982]
- Halkieria phylloidea He, 1981
- Halkieria praeinguis Jiang in Luo et al., 1982
- Halkieria projecta Bokova, 1985
- Halkieria sacciformis Meshkova, 1969
- Halkieria solida Mostler, 1980
- Halkieria sthenobasis Jiang in Luo et al., 1982
- Halkieria stonei Landing, 1989
- Halkieria symmetrica Poulsen, 1967
- Halkieria terastios Qian, Chen et Chen, 1979
- Halkieria uncostata Qian et Yin, 1984
- Halkieria undulata Wang, 1994
- Halkieria ventricosa Mostler, 1980
- Halkieria wangi Demidenko, 2010
- Halkieria zapfei Mostler, 1980

At present, the structure of complete scleritome is known only for the single species named Halkieria evangelista from the Lower Cambrian of Greenland (Sirius Passet Formation).
