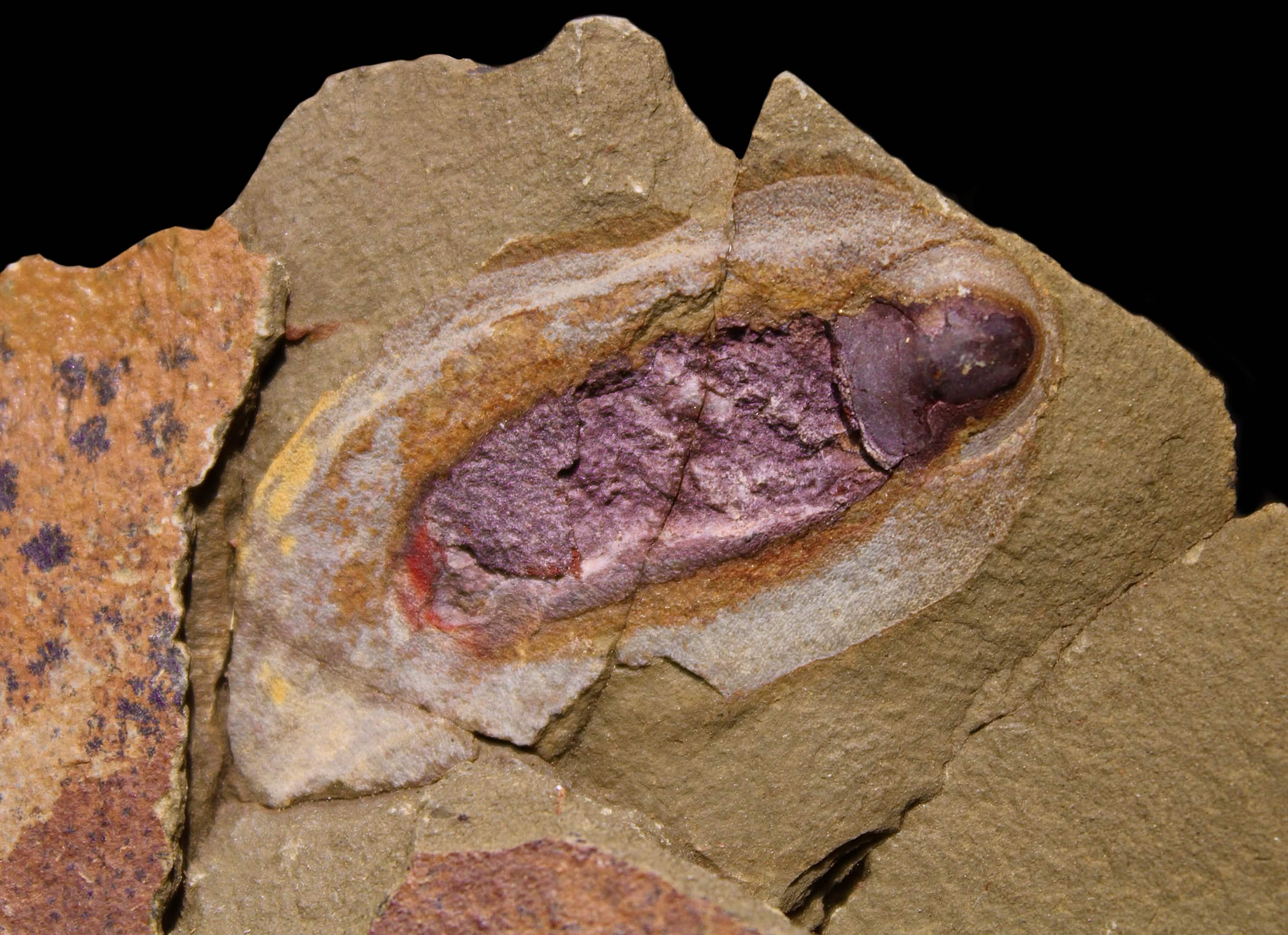
- Fossil specimen of Calvapilosa kroegeri

Scientific classification
- Kingdom: Animalia
- Phylum: Mollusca
- Family: †Siphogonuchitidae
- Genus: †Calvapilosa; Vinther et al., 2017
- Species: †C. kroegeri

Binomial name
- †Calvapilosa kroegeri Vinther et al., 2017

= Calvapilosa =

Calvapilosa Temporal range: Late Tremadocian, 480 Ma

Extinct genus of molluscs

Calvapilosa (Hairy Scalp) is an extinct genus of siphogonuchitid stem-aculiferan known from the Early Ordovician Fezouata Formation of Morocco. Its discovery and placement as a stem-aculiferan suggests that the ancestral mollusc bore a single shell rather than being shell-less like aplacophorans or bearing eight metameres like chitons and monoplacophoran soft tissues.

== Description ==
Calvapilosa is an elongate, flattened sachitid bearing a single anterior shell and a dense dorsal covering of sclerites shaped like fine, hollow spines. Calvapilosa confirms that sachitids are molluscs, as it has multiple synapomorphies of molluscs like a radula and mantle cavity. The holotype specimen is 16.7 mm long and 7.6 mm wide and probably represents a juvenile, while the paratype YPM 227515 is 68.3 mm in preserved length and at least 31 mm wide. However, isolated shell plates indicate that the largest specimens of Calvapilosa could reach up to 120 millimeters in length.

The shell is square-like with rounded corners and an apex situated anterior to the midpoint. While the shells of juvenile and subadult Calvapilosa have a shallow indentation on the posterior margin, this indentation becomes a nearly straight edge in adults. In life, the shell is largely covered by the mantle and sclerites. The shell displays holoperipheral growth, where new material is added at an equal rate all along the margin of the shell. In addition, the shell bears partially infilled structures that may be aesthete canals, which in modern chitons serve as photosensitive organs that allow for a form of sight.

The mineralized sclerites coat the entire dorsal surface of the mantle and are not arranged in distinct morphological zones. They can be square, polygonal, or circular in cross-section. In the holotype, the sclerites are 57±20 μm in diameter and between 0.5 and 1.2 millimeters in length. Meanwhile, the sclerites of YPM 227515 are about 70 μm in diameter and 0.8 millimeters in length, suggesting that the sclerites in juveniles are larger relative to body size.

The ventral girdle is smooth and flanks an extensive mantle cavity and foot region. The radula is composed of at least 125 tooth rows that are composed of a median tooth, four smaller lateral teeth, a major cusp, and two rows of obliquely and posteriorly oriented uncinal teeth.

== Evolutionary significance ==
Calvapilosa's placement as a stem-aculiferan suggests that the ancestral crown-mollusc had a single anterior shell plate, unmineralized sclerites, and a polystichous radula composed of a median tooth and several flanking teeth. Calvapilosa further suggests that aculiferans evolved from a body plan with one anterior shell to a two-shelled body plan like Halkieria, which further evolved into the eight-plated form of crown-aculiferans like Matthevia and chitons and the secondary loss of valves in aplacophorans.

Bayesian analysis phylogenetic tree from Vinther, et al. 2017:

- - Kimberella
  - - Odontogriphus†
    - Wiwaxia†
  - Mollusca
    - Conchifera
    - Aculifera
      - Siphogonuchitidae
        - Calvapilosa†
        - Siphogonuchites†
      - - Orthrozanclus†
        - - Halkieria†
          - - - Echinochiton†
              - - Multiplacophora
                  - Polysacos†
                  - Protobalanus†
                - Polyplacophora
                  - Glaphurochiton†
                  - - Leptochiton
                    - - Ochmazochiton†
                      - Chitonida
            - Aplacophora
              - Phthipodochiton†
              - Matthevia†
              - Kulindroplax†
              - Solenogastres
                Genitoconia
              - - Acaenoplax†
                - Caudofoveata
                  Chaetoderma
