= Evolution of molluscs =

Anatomical diagram of a hypothetical ancestral mollusc

The evolution of the molluscs is the way in which the Mollusca, one of the largest groups of invertebrate animals, evolved. This phylum includes gastropods, bivalves, scaphopods, cephalopods, and several other groups. The fossil record of mollusks is relatively complete, and they are well represented in most fossil-bearing marine strata. Very early organisms which have dubiously been compared to molluscs include Kimberella and Odontogriphus.

== Fossil record ==
The tiny Helcionellid fossil Yochelcionella is thought to be an early mollusc

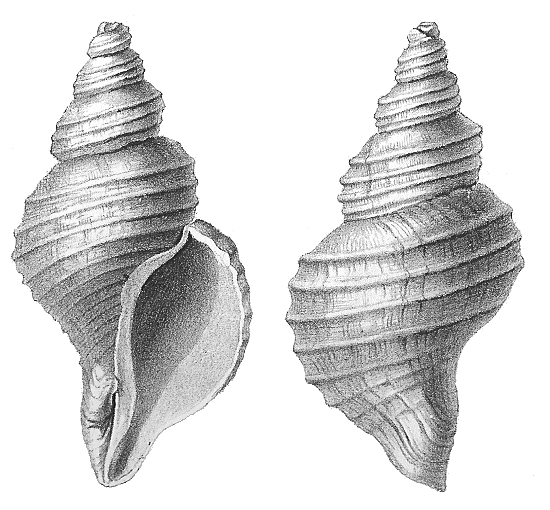
Spirally coiled shells appear in many gastropods.

Good evidence exists for the appearance of gastropods, cephalopods and bivalves in the Cambrian period 538.8 to 486.85 million years ago. However, the evolutionary history both of the emergence of molluscs from the ancestral group Lophotrochozoa, and of their diversification into the well-known living and fossil forms, is still vigorously debated.

Debate occurs about whether some Ediacaran and Early Cambrian fossils are molluscs. Kimberella, from about 555 million years ago, has been described by some palaeontologists as "mollusc-like", but others are unwilling to go further than "probable bilaterian". There is an even sharper debate about whether Wiwaxia, from about 505 million years ago, was a mollusc, and much of this centers on whether its feeding apparatus was a type of radula or more similar to that of some polychaete worms. Nicholas Butterfield, who opposes the idea that Wiwaxia was a mollusc, has written that earlier microfossils from 515 to 510 million years ago are fragments of a genuinely mollusc-like radula. This appears to contradict the concept that the ancestral molluscan radula was mineralized.

However, the Helcionellids, which first appear over 540 million years ago in Early Cambrian rocks from Siberia and China, are thought to be early molluscs with rather snail-like shells. Shelled molluscs therefore predate the earliest trilobites. Although most helcionellid fossils are only a few millimeters long, specimens a few centimeters long have also been found, most with more limpet-like shapes. The tiny specimens have been suggested to be juveniles and the larger ones adults.

Some analyses of helcionellids concluded these were the earliest gastropods. However, other scientists are not convinced these Early Cambrian fossils show clear signs of the torsion characteristic of modern gastropods, that twists the internal organs so the anus lies above the head.

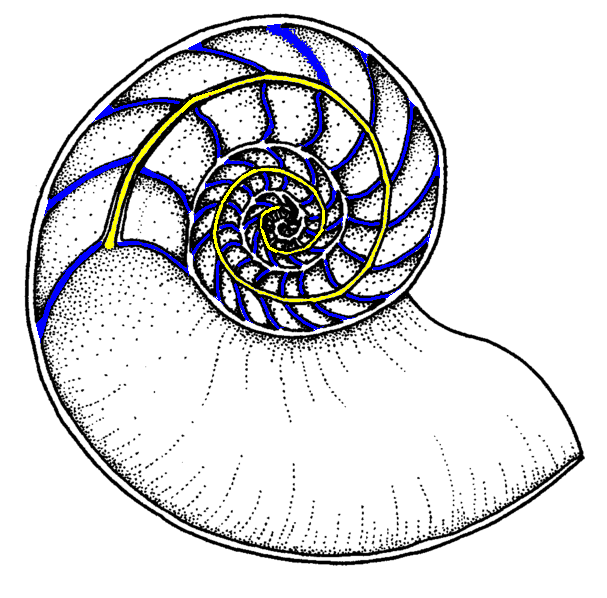
Septa and siphuncle in nautiloid shell

Volborthella, some fossils of which predate 530 million years ago, was long thought to be a cephalopod, but discoveries of more detailed fossils showed its shell was not secreted, but built from grains of the mineral silicon dioxide (silica), and it was not divided into a series of compartments by septa as those of fossil shelled cephalopods and the living Nautilus are. Volborthella's classification is uncertain. The Late Cambrian fossil Plectronoceras is now thought to be the earliest clearly cephalopod fossil, as its shell had septa and a siphuncle, a strand of tissue that Nautilus uses to remove water from compartments it has vacated as it grows, and which is also visible in fossil ammonite shells. However, Plectronoceras and other early cephalopods crept along the seafloor instead of swimming, as their shells contained a "ballast" of stony deposits on what is thought to be the underside, and had stripes and blotches on what is thought to be the upper surface. All cephalopods with external shells except the nautiloids became extinct by the end of the Cretaceous period 65 million years ago. However, the shell-less Coleoidea (squid, octopus, cuttlefish) are abundant today.

The Early Cambrian fossils Fordilla and Pojetaia are regarded as bivalves. "Modern-looking" bivalves appeared in the Ordovician period, 488 to 443 million years ago. One bivalve group, the rudists, became major reef-builders in the Cretaceous, but became extinct in the Cretaceous–Paleogene extinction event. Even so, bivalves remain abundant and diverse.

The Hyolitha are a class of extinct animals with a shell and operculum that may be molluscs. Authors who suggest they deserve their own phylum do not comment on the position of this phylum in the tree of life

== Phylogeny ==
- Lophotrochozoa
  - Brachiopods
  - - - - - Bivalves
          - Monoplacophorans
            ("limpet-like", "living fossils")
          - - Gastropods
              (snails, slugs, limpets, sea hares)
            - - Cephalopods
                (nautiloids, ammonites, squid, etc.)
              - Scaphopods (tusk shells)
      - - Aplacophorans
          (spicule-covered, worm-like)
        - Polyplacophorans (chitons)
    - - Halwaxiids
        - Wiwaxia
        - Halkieria
      - Orthrozanclus
    - Odontogriphus

A possible "family tree" of molluscs (2007). Does not include annelid worms as the analysis concentrated on fossilizable "hard" features.

The phylogeny (evolutionary "family tree") of molluscs is a controversial subject. In addition to the debates about whether Kimberella and any of the "halwaxiids" were molluscs or closely related to molluscs, debates arise about the relationships between the classes of living molluscs. In fact, some groups traditionally classified as molluscs may have to be redefined as distinct but related.

Molluscs are generally regarded members of the Lophotrochozoa, a group defined by having trochophore larvae and, in the case of living Lophophorata, a feeding structure called a lophophore. The other members of the Lophotrochozoa are the annelid worms and seven marine phyla. The diagram on the right summarizes a phylogeny presented in 2007.

Because the relationships between the members of the family tree are uncertain, it is difficult to identify the features inherited from the last common ancestor of all molluscs. For example, it is uncertain whether the ancestral mollusc was metameric (composed of repeating units)—if it was, that would suggest an origin from an annelid-like worm. Scientists disagree about this: Giribet and colleagues concluded, in 2006, the repetition of gills and of the foot's retractor muscles were later developments, while in 2007, Sigwart concluded the ancestral mollusc was metameric, and it had a foot used for creeping and a "shell" that was mineralized. In one particular branch of the family tree, the shell of conchiferans is thought to have evolved from the spicules (small spines) of aplacophorans; but this is difficult to reconcile with the embryological origins of spicules.

The molluscan shell appears to have originated from a mucus coating, which eventually stiffened into a cuticle. This would have been impermeable and thus forced the development of more sophisticated respiratory apparatus in the form of gills. Eventually, the cuticle would have become mineralized, using the same genetic machinery (the engrailed gene) as most other bilaterian skeletons. The first mollusc shell almost certainly was reinforced with the mineral aragonite.

The evolutionary relationships 'within' the molluscs are also debated, and the diagrams below show two widely supported reconstructions:

- Molluscs
  - Aculifera
    - - Solenogastres
      - Caudofoveata
    - Polyplacophorans
  - Conchifera
    - Monoplacophorans
    - - Bivalves
      - Scaphopods
      - Gastropods
      - Cephalopods

The "Aculifera" hypothesis

- Molluscs
  - - Solenogastres
    - Caudofoveata
    - Testaria
      - Polyplacophorans
      - - Monoplacophorans
        - - Bivalves
          - Scaphopods
          - Gastropods
          - Cephalopods

The "Testaria" hypothesis

Morphological analyses tend to recover a conchiferan clade that receives less support from molecular analyses, although these results also lead to unexpected paraphylies, for instance scattering the bivalves throughout all other mollusc groups.

However, an analysis in 2009 using both morphological and molecular phylogenetics comparisons concluded the molluscs are not monophyletic; in particular, Scaphopoda and Bivalvia are both separate, monophyletic lineages unrelated to the remaining molluscan classes; the traditional phylum Mollusca is polyphyletic, and it can only be made monophyletic if scaphopods and bivalves are excluded. A 2010 analysis recovered the traditional conchiferan and aculiferan groups, and showed molluscs were monophyletic, demonstrating that available data for solenogastres was contaminated. Current molecular data are insufficient to constrain the molluscan phylogeny, and since the methods used to determine the confidence in clades are prone to overestimation, it is risky to place too much emphasis even on the areas of which different studies agree. Rather than eliminating unlikely relationships, the latest studies add new permutations of internal molluscan relationships, even bringing the conchiferan hypothesis into question.

== Further references ==
- Ruppert, E.E., Fox, R.S., and Barnes, R.D. (2004). Invertebrate Zoology (7 ed.). Brooks / Cole. ISBN 0-03-025982-7.
