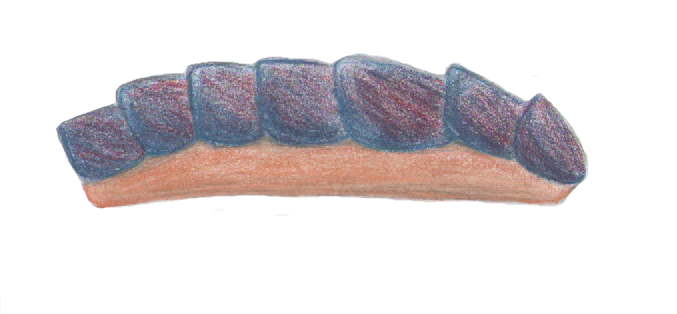

Scientific classification
- Kingdom: Animalia
- Phylum: Mollusca
- Class: Aplacophora
- Genus: †Kulindroplax; Sutton, Briggs, Siveter, Siveter and Sigwart, 2012
- Species: †K. perissokomos

Binomial name
- †Kulindroplax perissokomos Sutton, Briggs, Siveter, Siveter and Sigwart, 2012

= Kulindroplax =

Kulindroplax Temporal range: Wenlock

Extinct genus of molluscs

Kulindroplax perissokomos is a Silurian mollusk, known from a single fossil from the Coalbrookdale Formation fauna of England. It lived during the Homerian Age (about 425 million years ago). It is considered a basal aplacophoran. Unlike all modern aplacophorans, which are shell-less, Kulindroplax has a chiton-like shell, and it is considered a transitional fossil in the evolution of molluscs.

The only known specimen, described in 2012, was conserved at the Oxford University Museum of Natural History.

== Morphology ==
Kulindroplax is about 2 cm (0.79 in) wide and 4 cm (1.6 in) long. It is the first known mollusk showing an unambiguous combination of valves, or exterior shells, and a worm-like body. It bears seven similar, unarticulated valves, with a shorter head valve and a taller caudal one, lacking ornaments and also several densely packed, 1–2 mm long spicules. It has no discernible foot, and the radula is not preserved. A gill array is present, along with a respiratory cavity opening posteriorly. These features make it more reminiscent of caudofoveate aplacophorans.

While aculiferan mollusks usually bear eight dorsal valves (except for multiplacophorans and Acaenoplax), Kulindroplax bears only seven in a single chiton-like row.

== Life habits ==
Kulindroplax seems adapted to moving through a substrate, with the spicules acting as "sediment ratchets". In contrast with some modern aplacophorans like the caudofoveates, which live within the sea bottom sediments, Kulindroplax probably crawled on the bottom, requiring a dorsal armour.

== Evolutionary significance ==
Kulindroplax settles a 20-year-long dispute about the phylogeny of mollusks, namely the relationship of the worm-like, carnivorous Aplacophora within the group, in particular their relationship to the Polyplacophora. Aplacophorans have been historically variously treated as either a mollusk base-group, distant relatives of Cephalopoda or as a sister group to Polyplacophora in the clade Aculifera. Both molecular and fossil evidence appeared to support the last hypothesis. Including Kulindroplax in a phylogenetic matrix with other mollusks and mollusk-like fossil taxa allows to consistently resolve Aculifera as a sister group to Conchifera, in all variants of the analysis, thus bringing the fossil record in line with the recent molecular evidence.

While other fossil taxa like Acaenoplax and Phthipodochiton showed intermediate features between aplacophorans and polyplacophorans, no unambiguous fossil with an aplacophoran-like body and a polyplacophoran-like shell has been found before Kulindroplax.

Below is a cladogram of mollusk phylogeny according to Sutton et al., 2012. Taxa marked with † are extinct.

- ← Lophotrochozoa
  - Brachiopoda
  - - Odontogriphus†
    - Halwaxiids†
    - Mollusca
      - Conchifera
      - Aculifera
        - Polyplacophora
          - Echinochiton†
          - Neoloricata
        - Aplacophora
          - Epimenia
          - Septemchiton†
          - - Chaetoderma
            - - Phthipodochiton†
              - - Kulindroplax†
                - - Acaenoplax†
                  - Matthevia†
