= Phthipodochiton =

Phthipodochiton Temporal range: Upper Ordovician

Scientific classification
- Kingdom: Animalia
- Phylum: Mollusca
- Class: Polyplacophora
- Order: †Paleoloricata
- Genus: †Phthipodochiton; Sutton and Sigwart, 2012
- Species: †P. thraivensis

Binomial name
- †Phthipodochiton thraivensis Sutton and Sigwart, 2012

Extinct genus of mollusc

Phthipodochiton is an extinct genus of molluscs, known from several fossils from the upper Ordovician fauna of the Lady Burn Starfish beds of Girvan, Scotland. It shows a mixture of aplacophoran body plan and polyplacophoran-like valves, and it is an informative fossil in the evolution of aculiferan mollusks.

It was previously classified under the genus Helminthochiton, but it has been reassigned to its own genus in 2012.

== Morphology ==
Phthipodochiton body is worm-like, with eight polyplacophoran-like valves but no true foot, though a pedal groove may be present. Head and tail valves are slightly smaller than the intermediate ones. The only ornaments on the valves appear to be growth lines. The body is also covered by a sheet of spicules; no radula has been preserved.

== Life habits ==
Phthipodochiton was carnivorous, feeding on crinoids, as shown by a fossil preserved with gut contents. In contrast with modern chitons, Phthipodochiton probably did not creep on its foot but had a locomotion style similar to that of solenogastres.

== Taxonomy ==
Phthipodochiton shares similarities with genera as Alastega, Robustum and Septemchiton. but it is sufficiently distinct from all of them to be considered a separate species. It is considered to belong to the aplacophoran stem lineage, along with Acaenoplax, and it has also been placed close to Matthevia and the shelled aplacophoran Kulindroplax in phylogenetic analyses.
