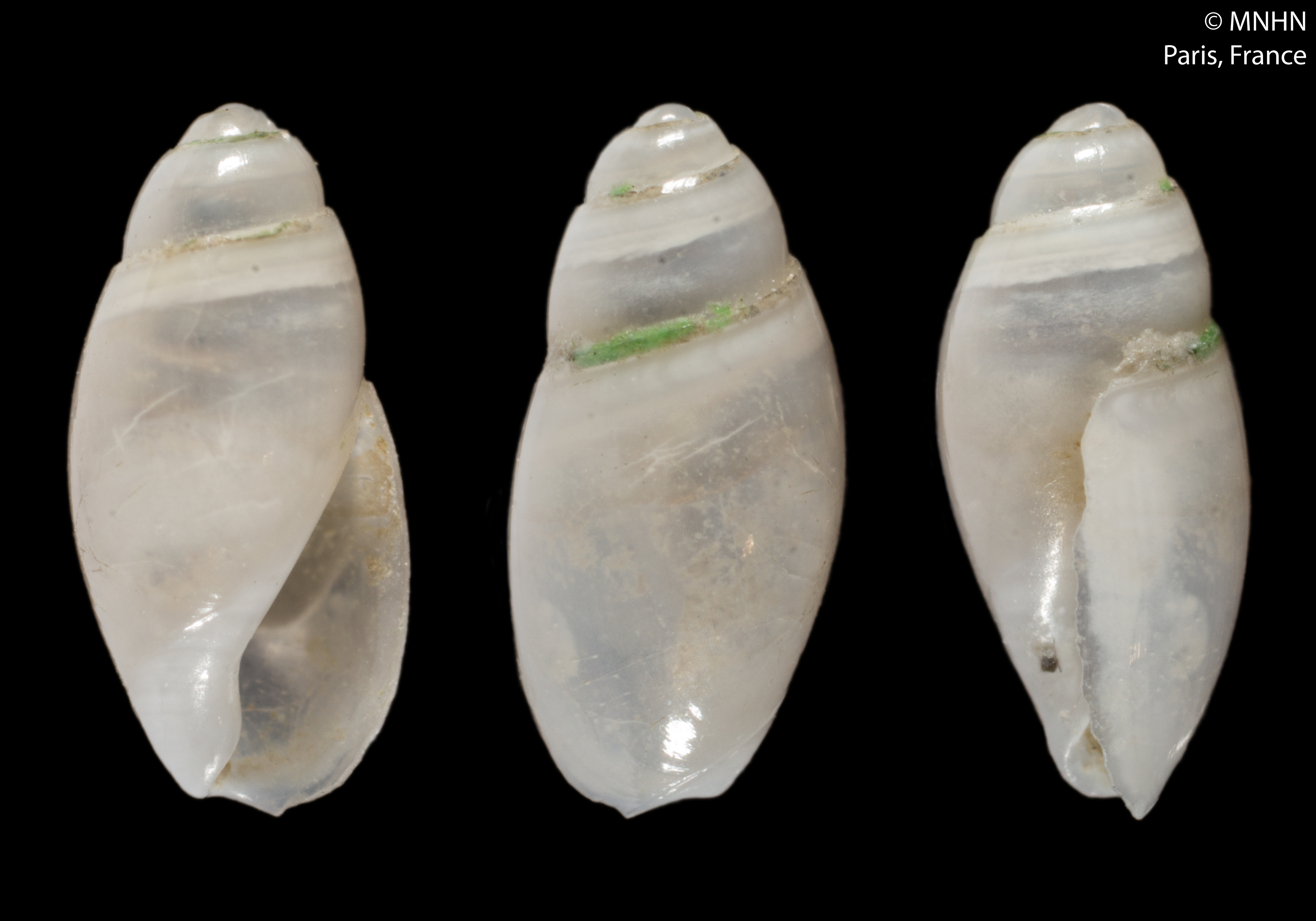
- Shell of Olivella careorugula (holotype at MNHN, Paris)

Scientific classification
- Kingdom: Animalia
- Phylum: Mollusca
- Class: Gastropoda
- Subclass: Caenogastropoda
- Order: Neogastropoda
- Family: Olividae
- Genus: Olivella
- Species: O. careorugula

Binomial name
- Olivella careorugula Absalão & Pimenta, 2003

Synonyms
- Olivella (Anasser) careorugula Absalão & Pimenta, 2003

= Olivella careorugula =

Species of gastropod

Olivella careorugula is a species of small sea snail, marine gastropod mollusk in the subfamily Olivellinae, in the family Olividae, the olives. Species in the genus Olivella are commonly called dwarf olives.

== Description ==
The length of the shell attains 5.2 mm. This species lacks a radula and odontophore.

== Distribution ==
This marine species occurs off Southeast Brazil.
