= Strobilepis =

Strobilepis Temporal range: Mid Devonian – Pennsylvanian

Scientific classification
- Domain: Eukaryota
- Kingdom: Animalia
- Phylum: Mollusca
- Class: Polyplacophora
- Order: †Multiplacophora
- Genus: †Strobilepis; Clarke in Hall & Clarke, 1888
- Species: †S. spinigera

Binomial name
- †Strobilepis spinigera Clarke in Hall & Clarke, 1888

Extinct genus of molluscs

Strobilepis is an extinct genus of Devonian-Carboniferous Multiplacophoran bearing close similarity to Polysacos.
