= Heloplacidae =

Heloplacidae Temporal range: Silurian

Scientific classification
- Domain: Eukaryota
- Kingdom: Animalia
- Phylum: Mollusca
- Class: incertae sedis
- Family: †Heloplacidae; Cherns, 2004

Genera
- Acaenoplax Sutton et al, 2001; Arctoplax Cherns, 1998; Enetoplax Cherns, 1998; Emo? Sutton et al, 2025; Heloplax Cherns, 1998

Extinct family of molluscs

The Heloplacidae are a group of plated aplacophora known from Silurian deposits. Their best understood representative, Acaenoplax, can be taken as representative of the family; it is the only genus for which soft part anatomy is known.
