= Helminthochiton =

Helminthochiton Temporal range: Ordovician–Permian

Scientific classification
- Domain: Eukaryota
- Kingdom: Animalia
- Phylum: Mollusca
- Class: Polyplacophora
- Order: Lepidopleurida
- Family: Leptochitonidae
- Subfamily: †Helminthochitoninae
- Genus: †Helminthochiton

Extinct genus of molluscs

Helminthochiton is an extinct genus of polyplacophoran mollusc. Helminthochiton became extinct during the Permian period.

Helminthochiton grayiae was recognised as the type species for Septemchiton. This was named for Elizabeth Gray who collected fossils at Girvan.

Helminthochiton thraivensis has been reassigned to the genus Phthipodochiton in 2012.
