= Amphineura =

Amphineura is a synonym of:

- Aculifera
- Polyplacophora
