= Siphogonuchites =

Siphogonuchites Temporal range: Early Cambrian

Scientific classification
- Kingdom: Animalia
- Superphylum: Lophotrochozoa
- Phylum: Mollusca
- Clade: †Sachitida
- Family: †Siphogonuchitidae
- Genus: †Siphogonuchites; Qian, 1977

Type species
- Siphogonuchites triangularis Qian, 1977

Synonyms
- Maikhanella? (sciotaxon) Zhegallo, 1982; Lopochites? (sciotaxon) Qian, 1977; Dabashanites? (sciotaxon) Chen, 1979

Extinct genus of slug-like animals

Siphogonuchites is an extinct genus of siphogonuchitid from China and Russia.

== Species ==
- † Siphogonuchites equilateralis Qian & Yin (1984)
- †Siphogonuchites subremualis Bokova, 1985
