= Siphogonuchitidae =

Siphogonuchitidae Temporal range: Early Cambrian–Tremadocian

Scientific classification
- Kingdom: Animalia
- Superphylum: Lophotrochozoa
- Phylum: Mollusca
- (unranked): †Halwaxiida
- Family: †Siphogonuchitidae

Genera
- †Siphogonuchites (sciotaxon); †Maikhanella (synonymous?) (sciotaxon); †Lopochites (synonymous?) (sciotaxon); †Dabashanites (synonymous?) (sciotaxon); †Drepanochites (sciotaxon); †Tianzhushania; †Quadrosiphogonuchites; †Calvapilosa

Extinct family of molluscs

Siphogonuchitidae is a family of sachitids known mostly from isolated sclerites and shells.

== Description ==
The siphogonuchitid scleritome consists of two main kinds of sclerites (lopochitid, originally referred to Lopochites, and paleosulcachitid, originally referred to Siphogonuchites), as well as dabashanitid arrays of fused sclerites (originally referred to Dabashanites) and a maikhanellid (originally referred to Maikhanella) shell. Siphogonuchitid sclerites are hollow and bear prominent ridges.

Lopochitid sclerites are elongate, narrow, helically twisted by up to 90 degrees, and gently bent longitudinally, while palaeosulcachitid sclerites are flattened and curved in one plane. Dabashanitid sclerites are composed of multiple sclerites sharing a common base. They are likely derived from the fusion of paleosulcachitid sclerites and may serve as central branched sclerites of the siphogonuchitid scleritome.

Besides these basic types of sclerites, there are several other kinds that are much less common.

The maikhanellid shell is patelliform and bears a distinct pattern of scales. These scales are embedded siphogonuchitid sclerites.

Calvapilosa is the sole siphogonuchitid not known from isolated shells or sclerites, and bears a single anterior shell, a dorsoventrally flattened body, and a dorsal mantle coated in sclerites.
