= Freshwater mollusc =

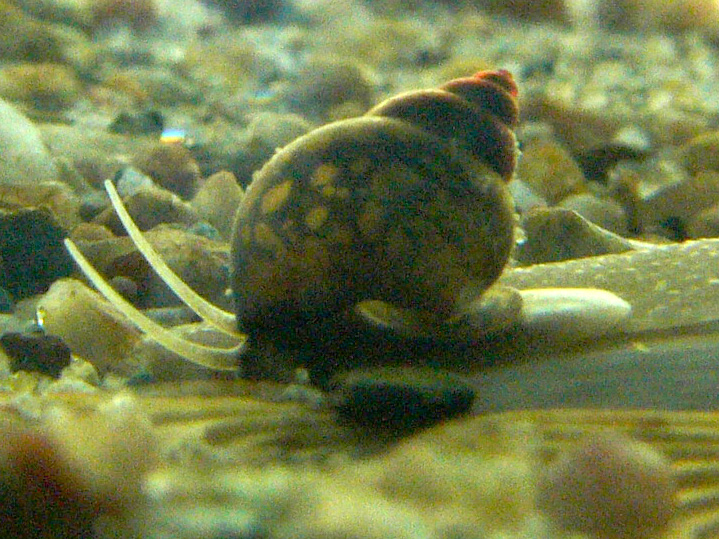
Bithynia tentaculata, a small freshwater gastropod in the family Bithyniidae

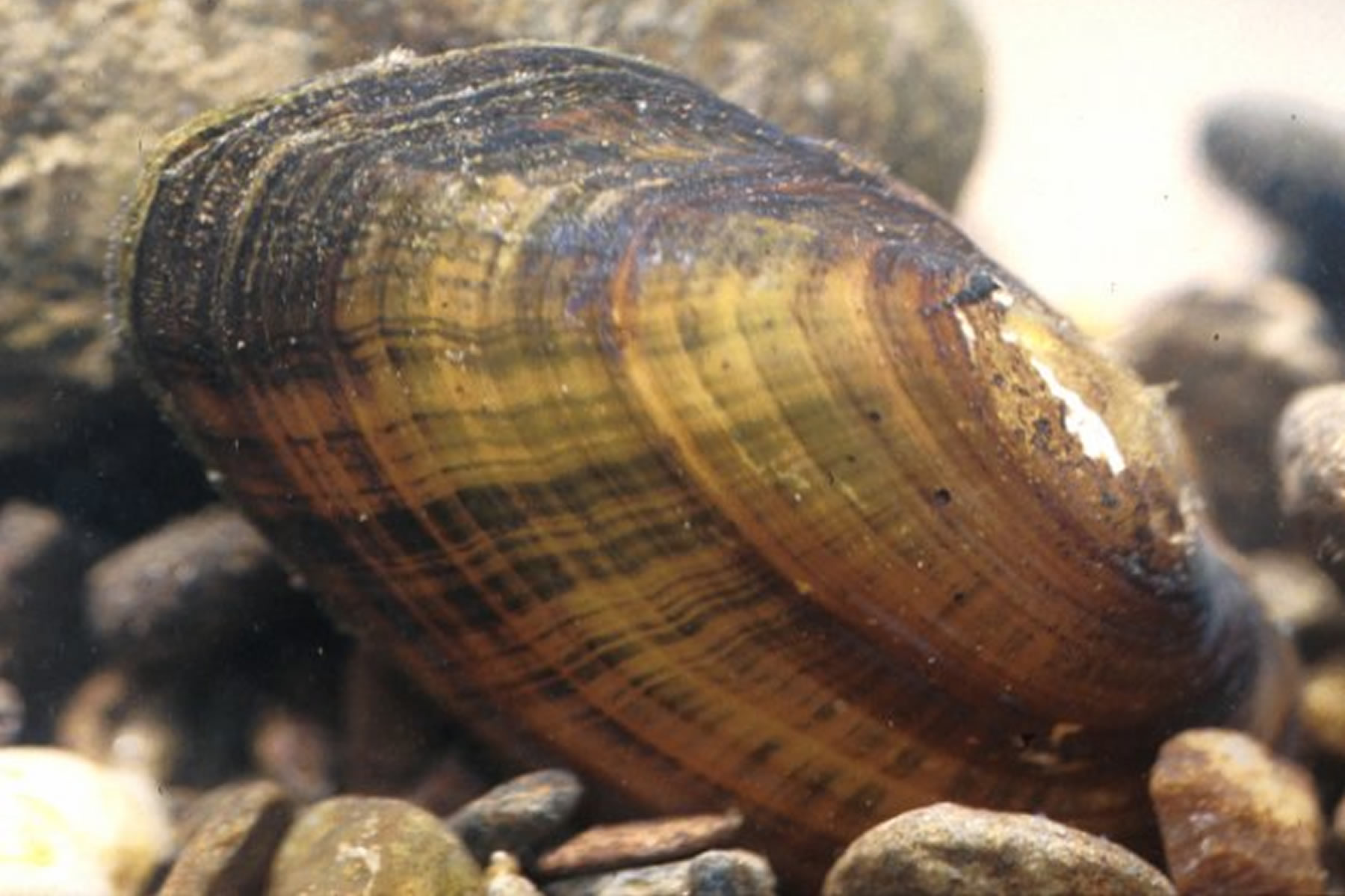
Freshwater bivalve Alasmidonta raveneliana

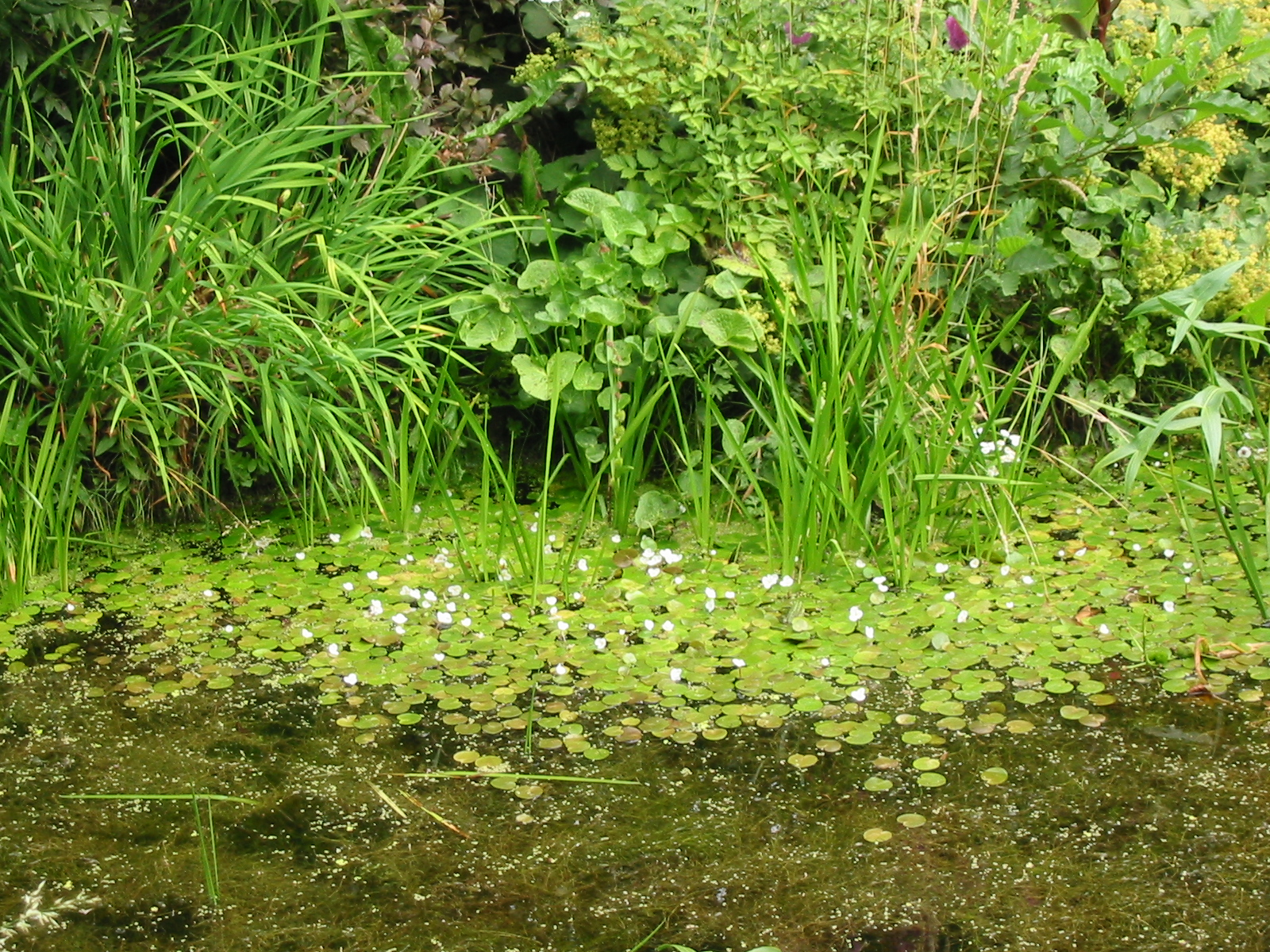
A freshwater habitat: a shallow ditch in Germany

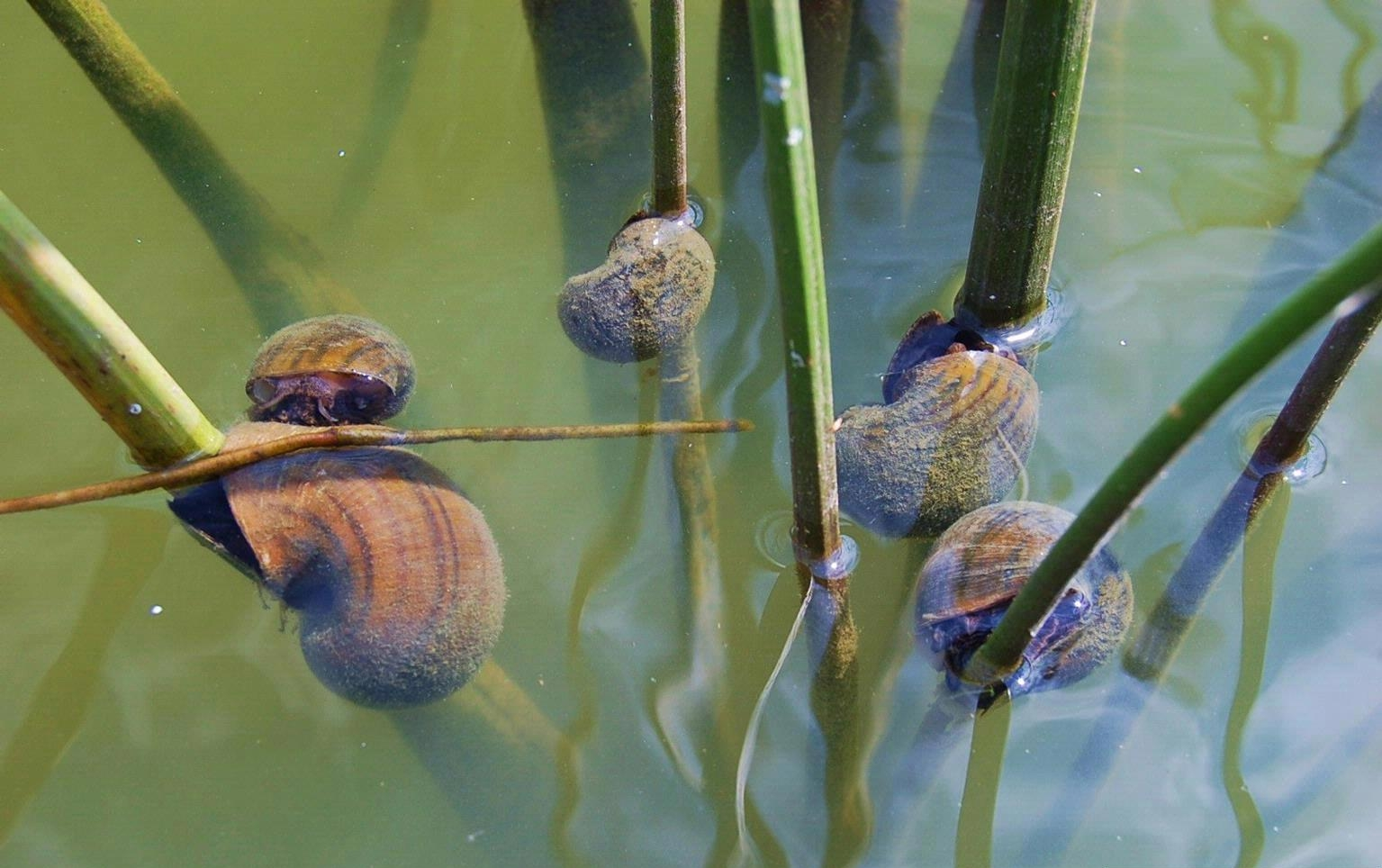
Pomacea insularum, an apple snail

Freshwater molluscs are those members of the phylum Mollusca which live in freshwater habitats, both lotic (flowing water) such as rivers, streams, canals, springs, and cave streams (stygobite species) and lentic (still water) such as lakes, ponds (including temporary or vernal ponds), and ditches.

This article is about freshwater Mollusca in general; for information on one particular family of freshwater molluscs, please follow the appropriate links in the lists below.

The two major classes of molluscs have representatives in freshwater: the gastropods (snails) and the bivalves (freshwater mussels and clams.) It appears that the other classes within the Phylum Mollusca -the cephalopods, scaphopods, polyplacophorans, etc. - never made the transition from a fully marine environment to a freshwater environment.

A few species of freshwater molluscs are among the most notorious invasive species. In contrast, numerous others have become threatened or have become extinct in the face of anthropogenic change.

== Biogeography ==
Typical freshwater species (such as many river mussel species in the family Unionidae) have a range which may consist of a series of adjacent river systems, a series of adjacent tributaries, or part of a single large river system. Large rivers and small tributary creeks typically share few species, and distribution patterns suggest large lowland rivers represent substantial barriers to the dispersal of species adapted to small upland streams. Endemism is common in some families, and species may be endemic to a single creek or spring. In contrast, some of the tiny pill clams have a nearly worldwide distribution (Burch, 1972)

== Ecological and anatomical challenges ==
Challenges in the natural environment faced by freshwater Mollusca include floods, droughts, siltation, extreme temperature variations, predation, and the constant unidirectional flow characteristic of river habitats. Osmoregulation, or the maintenance of constant salinity within body tissue and fluids, is another challenge faced by freshwater Mollusca. Dillon (2000) indicates that they have characteristically low tissue salinities relative to other freshwater animals, and unionid mussels have some of the lowest tissue salinities of any animal.

== Freshwater bivalves ==
Families of freshwater bivalves occur within the orders Unionida and Venerida.

== Freshwater gastropods ==
Ten families of prosobranchiate snails (gilled operculate snails) and five pulmonate families (lunged snails, distantly related to common landsnails) inhabit freshwater environments in many parts of the world. Some freshwater snail species serve as hosts for human and animal parasites.

== See also ==
- List of non-marine molluscs of the United States
