= Heloplax =

Scientific classification
- Domain: Eukaryota
- Kingdom: Animalia
- Phylum: Mollusca
- Class: incertae sedis
- Family: †Heloplacidae
- Genus: †Heloplax
- Species: †H. papilla

Binomial name
- †Heloplax papilla Cherns, 1998

Extinct genus of molluscs

Heloplax is a genus of worm-like molluscs. Its soft parts are preserved in three dimensions in the Silurian Herefordshire Lagerstatte; its disarticulated valves are known from other Silurian deposits. It is very bizarre by modern standards; it bears serially repeated units, and has spines. It probably falls somewhere between the aplacophorans and polyplacophora; its valves were composed of aragonite
