= Acaenoplax =

Acaenoplax Temporal range: Wenlock

Scientific classification
- Domain: Eukaryota
- Kingdom: Animalia
- Phylum: Mollusca
- Class: incertae sedis
- Family: †Heloplacidae
- Genus: †Acaenoplax
- Species: †A. hayae

Binomial name
- †Acaenoplax hayae Sutton et al, 2001

Extinct genus of molluscs

Acaenoplax is an extinct worm-shaped mollusc known from the Coalbrookdale Formation of Herefordshire, England. It lived in the Silurian period. It was a couple of centimetres long and half a centimetre wide, and comprises serially repeated units with seven or eight shells, and rings of 'spines'.

Some of its characters are reminiscent of the polychaete worms, and the character combinations do not place it obviously in the stem of any modern mollusc group, but although it was originally interpreted as a polychaete, this position is untenable for a number of reasons.

== Morphology ==
The organism resembles a bristled worm, but bears a number of shells on its upper surface. The first shell is cap-like, whereas the others are saddle-shaped. The rearmost shell is almost rectangular, whereas the others are more circular, with spines on the rear surface of the third to sixth shells. The originally-aragonitic shells do not overlap. There are eighteen rows of spines projecting from ridges in the body surface, which encircle the body except for its bottom surface, which presumably bore a molluscan foot. Its straight gut was preserved in phosphate.

== Affinity ==
Heloplax, Enetoplax and Arctoplax are genera of shell that are closely related to Acaenoplax, but whose soft tissue is not preserved.

== See also ==
- Kulindroplax, a possibly related seven-shelled mollusk from the same Lagerstätte.
