= Polysacos =

Polysacos Temporal range: 335 Ma

Scientific classification
- Domain: Eukaryota
- Kingdom: Animalia
- Phylum: Mollusca
- Class: Polyplacophora
- Order: †Multiplacophora
- Genus: †Polysacos; Vendrasco et al., 2004
- Species: †P. vickersianum

Binomial name
- †Polysacos vickersianum Vendrasco et al., 2004

Extinct genus of molluscs

Polysacos is an extinct genus of multiplacophorans (chitons) known from articulated Carboniferous fossils; its seventeen shell plates are arranged in three rows, with seven iterated units. It demonstrates that multiplacophora are related to modern polyplacophora. It was fringed with a ring of hollow spines resembling those of the Ordovician Echinochiton.
