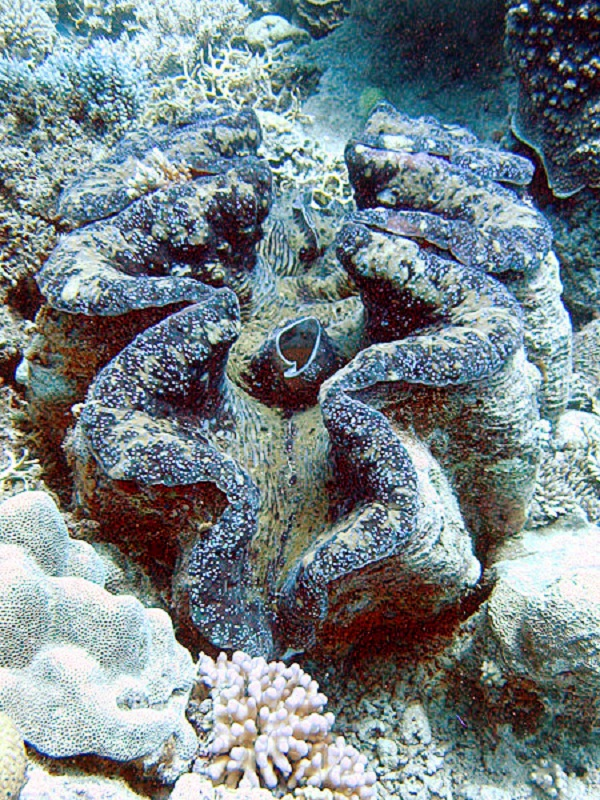

Scientific classification
- Kingdom: Animalia
- Phylum: Mollusca
- Subphylum: Conchifera; Gegenbaur, 1878

Classes
- Monoplacophora; Cephalopoda; Scaphopoda; Rostroconchia; Bivalvia; Gastropoda

= Conchifera =

Conchifera Temporal range: Fortunian - Recent

Taxonomic term for shell-bearing molluscs

Conchifera is a subphylum of the phylum Mollusca, containing five extant classes: Monoplacophora, Cephalopoda, Gastropoda, Bivalvia, and Scaphopoda. Conchiferans can bear a single shell as in snails and ammonites, a single pair of shells as in clams, or lack a shell as in slugs and squid. The other subphylum is Aculifera, the members of which are shellless or have a row of several plates. Non-monoplacophoran conchiferans emerged within the once-widespread Monoplacophora. The only descendant which retains its ancestral shape is the Tryblidiida.

The monophyly of Conchifera is supported by molecular phylogenetic analysis. The relationships among the members of Conchifera are disputed. A grouping of Scaphopoda and Bivalvia, named Diasoma, has been proposed, but other studies find scaphopods to be more closely related to cephalopods or gastropods.

Conchifera originated in the early Cambrian period.

== Classes ==
Classes within the Conchifera include:

- Monoplacophora
- Bivalvia
- Gastropoda
- Scaphopoda
- Cephalopoda
- Archinacelloidea†
- Rostroconchia†
- Helcionelloida†

== See also ==
- Evolution of Mollusca
