= Multiplacophora =

Multiplacophora Temporal range: Lower Cambrian–Permian

Scientific classification
- Domain: Eukaryota
- Kingdom: Animalia
- Phylum: Mollusca
- Class: Polyplacophora
- Order: †Multiplacophora; Hoare and Mapes, 1995

Families
- Hercolepadidae; Strobilepidae

Extinct order of molluscs

Multiplacophora is a stem-group of chitons with a number of plates arranged in 7 rows along the body. They date to at least the Upper Cambrian, but two lower Cambrian fossils- Ocruranus and Trachyplax - may extend the range downwards.

== Families and genera ==
- Family Hercolepadidae Dzik, 1986
  - Genus Hercolepas Aurivillius, 1892
  - Genus Protobalanus Hall and Clarke, 1888
- Family Strobilepidae Hoare and Mapes, 1995
  - Genus Aenigmatectus Hoare and Mapes, 1996
  - Genus Deltaplax Puchalski, Johnson, Kauffman and Eernisse, 2009
  - Genus Diadeloplax Hoare and Mapes, 1995
  - Genus Hannestheronia Vinther, Jell, Kampouris, Carney, Racicot & Briggs, 2012
  - Genus Polysacos Vendrasco, Wood and Runnegar, 2004
  - Genus Strobilepis Clarke in Hall and Clarke, 1888
