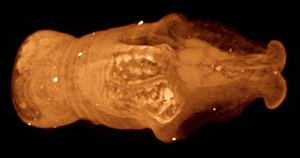
- Head region of the caudofoveate Falcidens

Scientific classification
- Kingdom: Animalia
- Phylum: Mollusca
- Clade: Aculifera
- Superclass: Aplacophora

Included groups
- Caudofoveata; Solenogastres

= Aplacophora =

Class of molluscs

Aplacophora /æpləˈkɒfərə/ is a superclass of small, deep-water, exclusively benthic, marine molluscs found in all oceans of the world.

All known modern forms are shell-less: only some extinct primitive forms possessed valves. The group comprises the two classes Solenogastres (Neomeniomorpha) and Caudofoveata (Chaetodermomorpha), which between them contain 28 families and about 320 species. The aplacophorans are traditionally considered ancestral to the other mollusc classes. However, the relationship between the two aplacophoran groups and to the other molluscan classes and to each other is as yet unclear.

Aplacophorans are cylindrical and worm-like in form, and most very small, being no longer than 5 centimetres (2 in); some species, however, can reach a length of 30 centimetres (12 in).

== Habitat ==
Caudofoveates generally burrow into the substrate while solenogasters are usually epibenthic. Both taxa are most common in water regions deeper than 20 metres (66 ft) where some species may reach densities up to four or five specimens per square metre (three or four per square yard). Solenogasters are typically carnivores feeding on cnidarians or sometimes annelids or other taxa while caudofoveates are mostly detritovores or feed on foraminiferans.

== Description ==
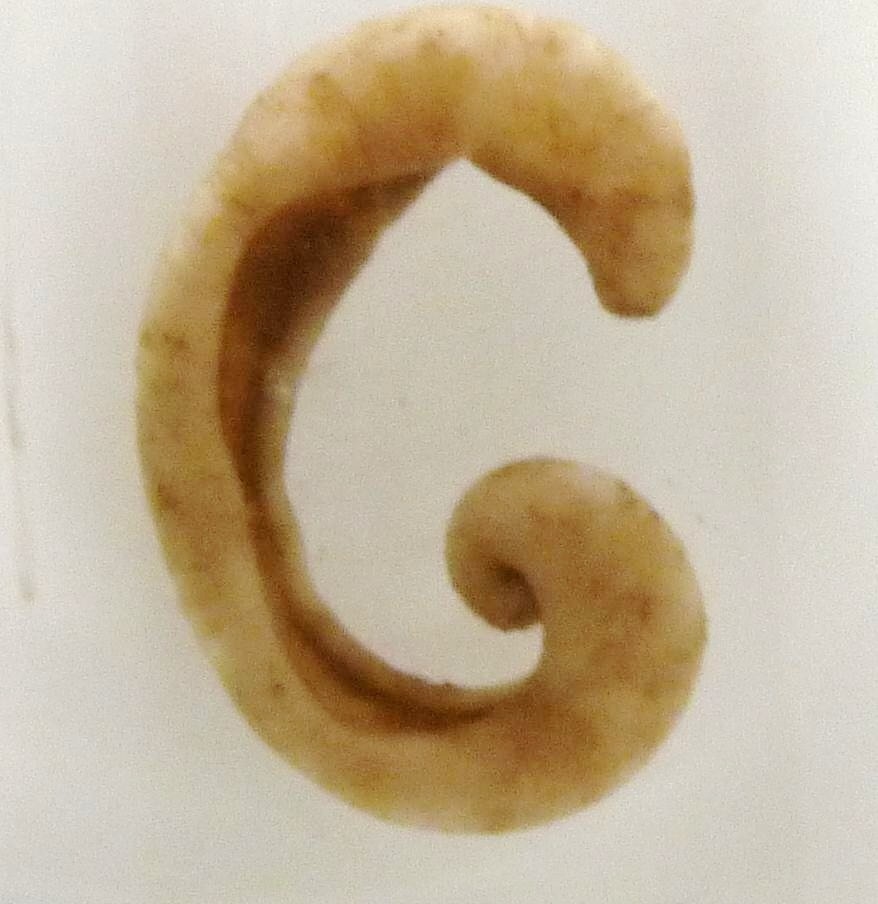
Epimenia babai, a member of the Solenogastres

Aplacophorans are worm-like animals, with little resemblance to most other molluscs. They have no shell, although small calcified spicules are embedded in the skin; these spicules are occasionally coated with an organic pellicle that is presumably secreted by microvilli. Caudofoveates lack a foot while solenogasters have a narrow foot which lacks intrinsic musculature. The mantle cavity is reduced into a simple cloaca, into which the anus and excretory organs empty, and is located at the posterior of the animal. The head is rudimentary, and has no eyes or tentacles. The cuticle of both subclasses is chitinous, and has an irregular texture. Spines bear an organic matrix. Sclerites can be hollow or solid; the void within the sclerites of some species fills during growth. Sclerites generally form within the cuticle, protruding through when they are fully grown. They probably start life as amorphous calcium carbonate, which the organic matrix coaxes into an aragonitic habit as the spines mature. Sclerites can be shaped as simple spines, straight, curved, keeled, striated or hooked; or as cupped blades; more complex arrangements are common in copulatory spicules. In several species of solenogaster, sclerites change morphology during growth; young specimens might bear flat, solid, scale-like sclerites, to be replaced with longer hollow spine-like sclerites in adults.

The relationship with other molluscs, however, is apparent from some features of the digestive system; aplacophorans possess both a radula and a style. A variety of radular forms and functions exist. Solenogasters are hermaphroditic and assumed to have internal fertilization, in contrast to caudofoveates which have two sexes, and reproduce by external fertilization. During development, the mantle cavity of the larva curls up and closes, creating the worm-like form of the adult. Caudofoveates also differ from Solenogasters in having a head shield and a body that is differentiated into three sections.

== Taxonomy and evolution ==
This class was once classified as sea cucumbers in the echinoderms. In 1987, they were officially recognized as molluscs and given their own class. It consists of two clades: the Solenogastres and the Caudofoveata. It has been considered polyphyletic but more recent molecular evidence supports it as a monophyletic clade.

The affinities of Aplacophorans have long been uncertain. Molecular and fossil evidence seemed to put Aplacophorans in the clade Aculifera, as a sister group to Polyplacophora. The discovery of Kulindroplax in 2012, a fossil aplacophoran with a polyplacophoran-like armour, strongly supports this hypothesis, and shows that aplacophorans evolved from progenitors that bore valves.
