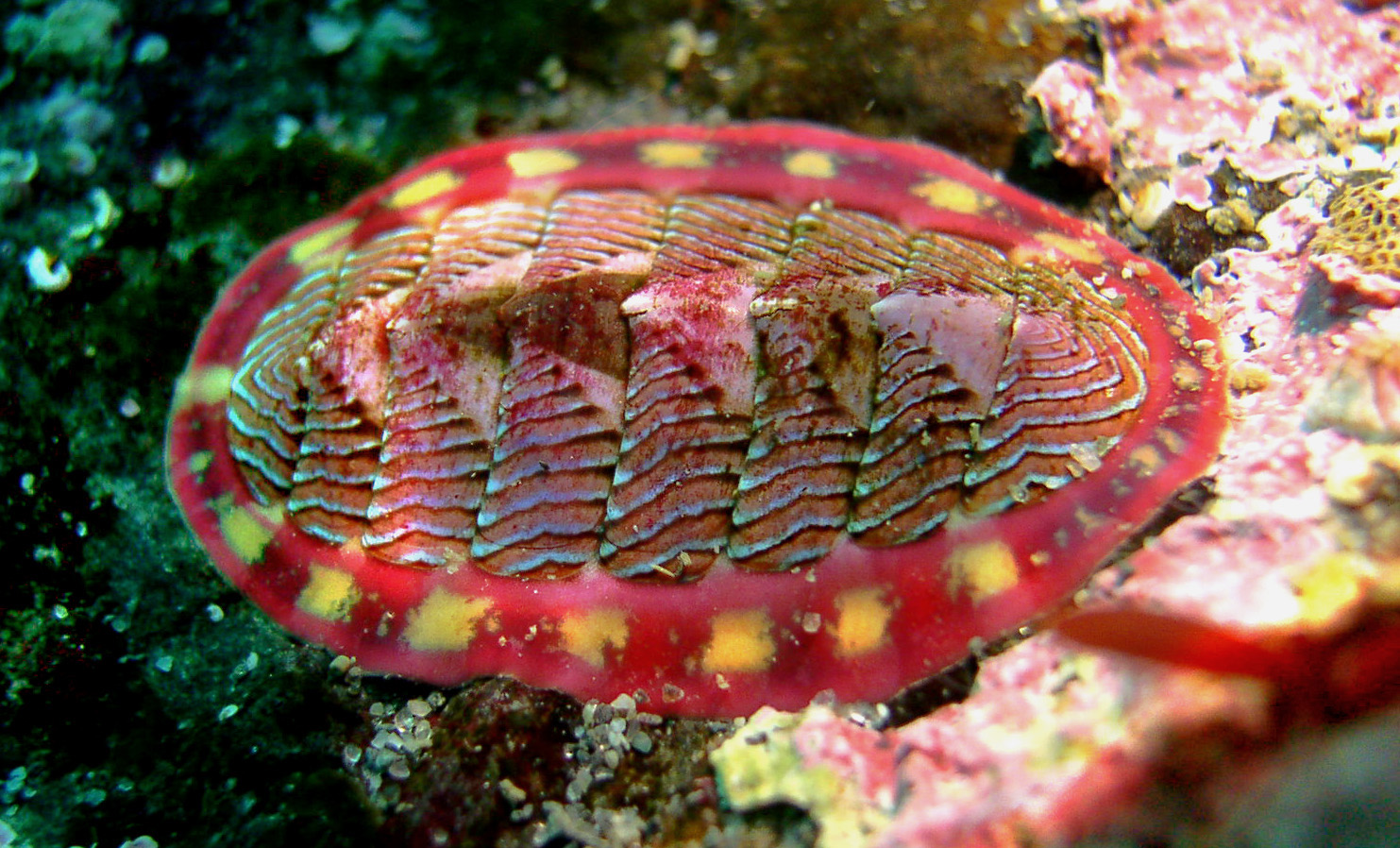
- A polyplacophoran (chiton)

Scientific classification
- Kingdom: Animalia
- Phylum: Mollusca
- Clade: Aculifera; Hatschek, 1891

Classes
- Polyplacophora; Caudofoveata; Solenogastres

= Aculifera =

Aculifera Temporal range: Cambrian Stage 4–Recent

Clade of molluscs

Aculifera (older name: Amphineura) is a clade of molluscs incorporating those groups that have no conch or shell, that is, the Polyplacophora, Caudofoveata and Solenogastres. It is a sister group to the Conchifera. Monophyly of Aculifera is supported by fossil, anatomical and molecular studies.

The oldest known aculiferan is Qaleruaqia, which was found in the Aftenstjernesø Formation in Greenland, which dates back to the Cambrian Stage 4.
