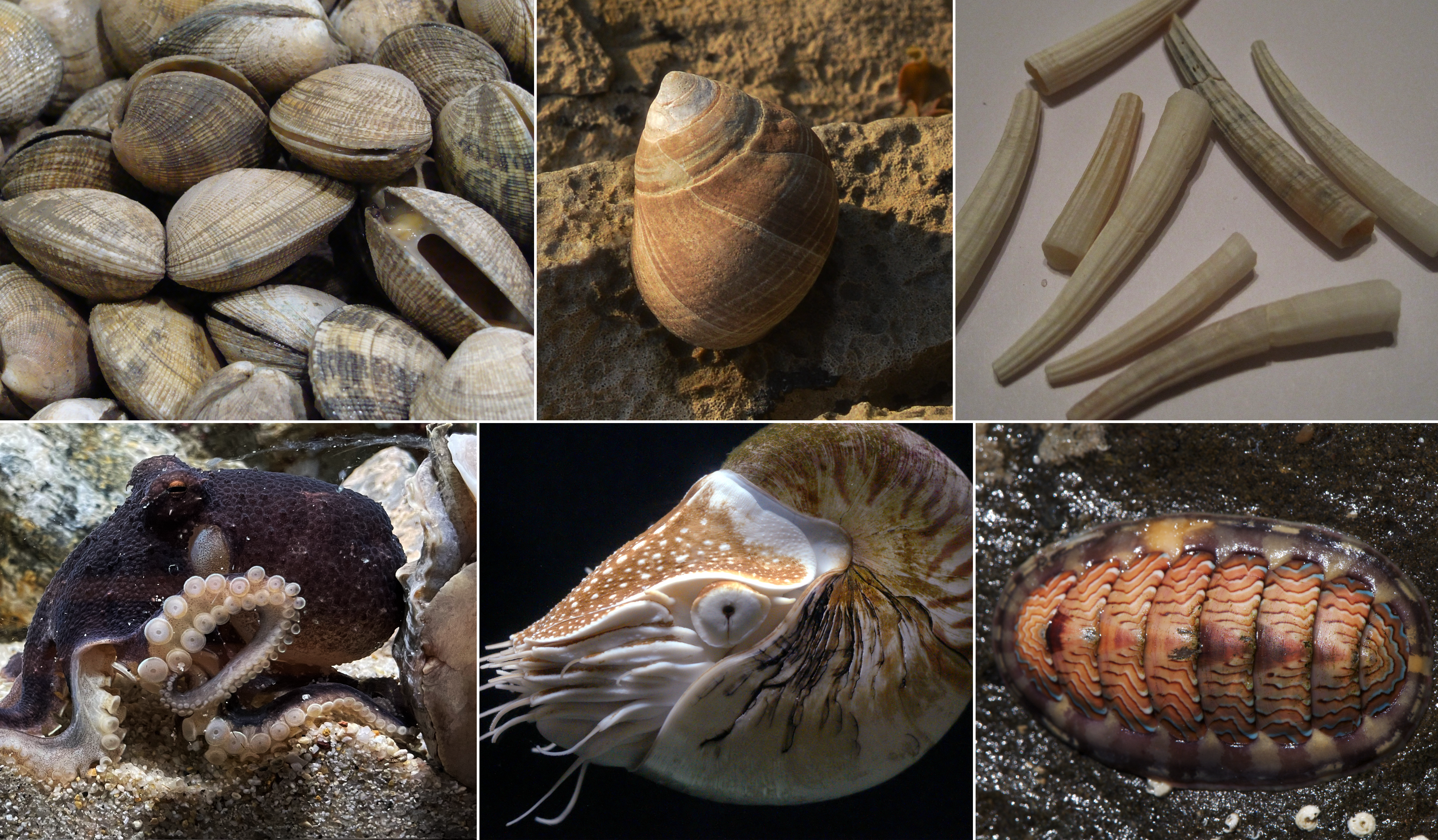
- Diversity of molluscs. Clockwise from top left: Ruditapes philippinarum, Littorina littorea, Dentalium sp., Tonicella lineata, Nautilus pompilius, and Amphioctopus fangsiao

Scientific classification
- Kingdom: Animalia
- Subkingdom: Eumetazoa
- Clade: ParaHoxozoa
- Clade: Bilateria
- Clade: Nephrozoa
- Clade: Protostomia
- Clade: Spiralia
- Superphylum: Lophotrochozoa
- Phylum: Mollusca; Linnaeus, 1758

Subphyla, unplaced genera, and classes
- incertae sedis; †Kimberella (?); †Typhloesus; †Odontogriphus; †Halwaxiida (Note: Most members of this clade are often linked to aculiferans); †Wiwaxia; †Shishania (?); †Halkieriidae; †Orthozanclidae; †Siphogonuchitidae; Aculifera; †Paleoloricata (possibly paraphyletic); †Heloplacidae; †Multiplacophora; Polyplacophora; Solenogastres; Caudofoveata; Conchifera; Monoplacophora (non-monophyletic); Cephalopoda; Scaphopoda; †Rostroconchia; †Helcionelloida; Gastropoda; Bivalvia

Diversity
- 89,857 recognized living species.

= Mollusca =

Mollusca Temporal range: Lower Cambrian – Present, 535–0 Ma

Phylum of invertebrate animals

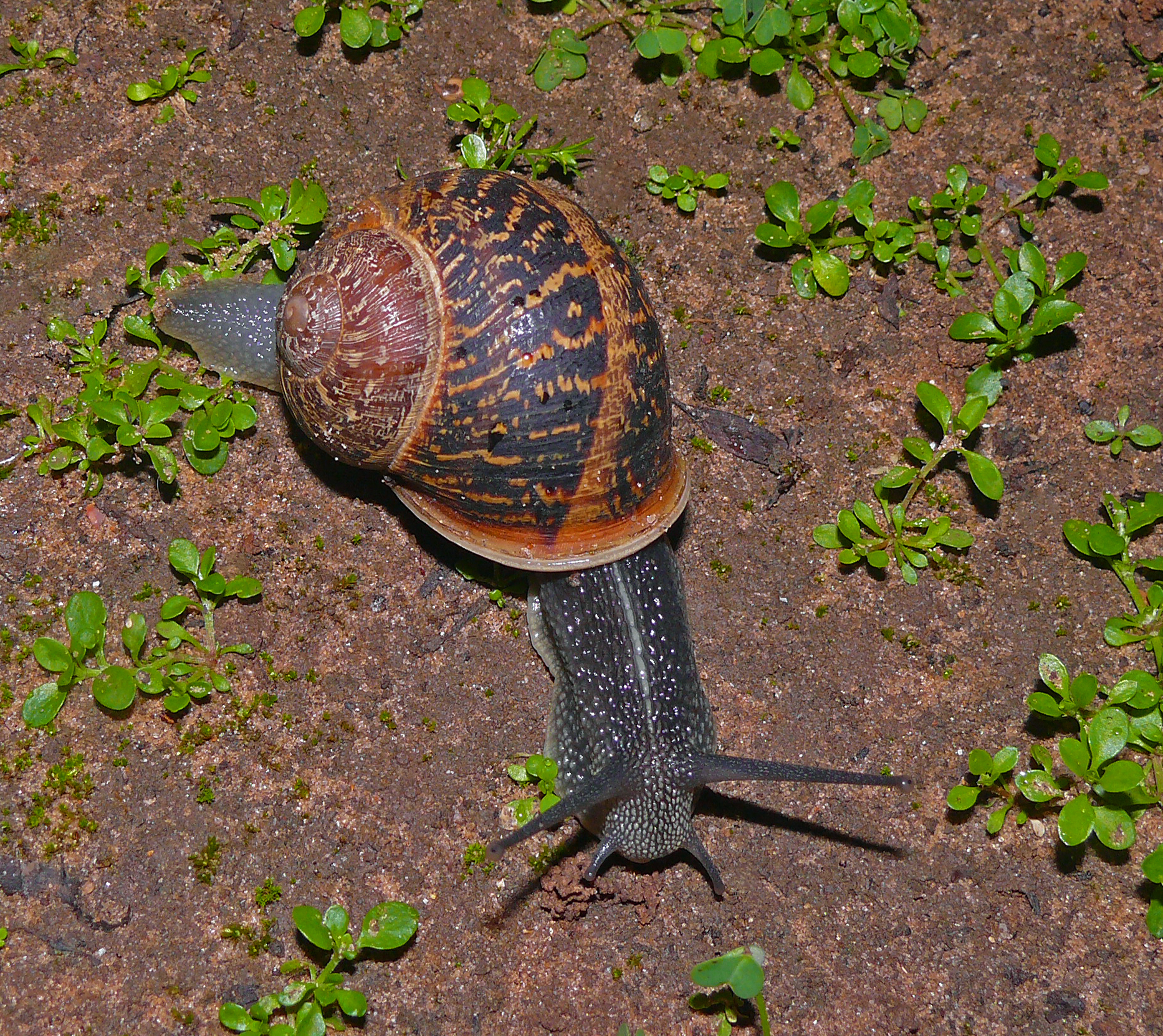
Cornu aspersum (formerly Helix aspersa)—a common land snail

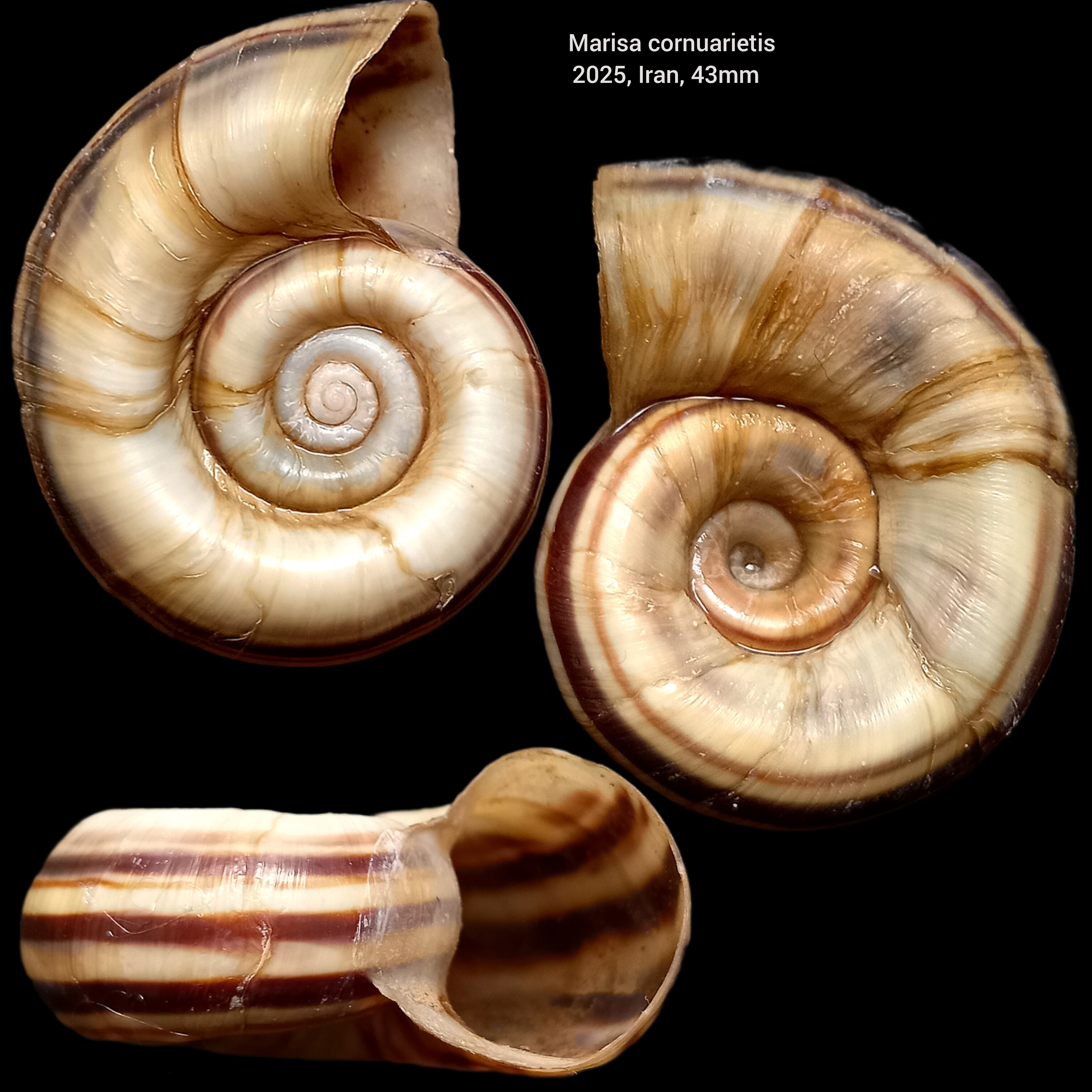
Shell of Marisa cornuarietis, a freshwater snail

Mollusca is a phylum of protostomic invertebrate animals, whose members are known as molluscs or mollusks (Note: The formerly dominant British spelling mollusk is still used in the United States — see the reasons given by Gary Rosenberg (1996). For the spelling mollusc, see the reasons given in: Brusca & Brusca. Invertebrates (2nd ed.).) (/ˈmɒləsks/). 89,857 extant species of molluscs are recognized with estimates ranging over 251,000 species, (Note: As of October 2026) making it the second-largest animal phylum after Arthropoda. The number of recognized fossil species is 57,219 with estimates between 60,000 and 100,000, and the proportion of undescribed extant species is very high. Many taxa remain poorly studied.

Molluscs are the largest marine phylum, comprising about 23% of all the named marine organisms. They are highly diverse, not just in size and anatomical structure, but also in behavior and habitat, as numerous groups are freshwater and even terrestrial species. The phylum is typically divided into 7 or 8 taxonomic classes, of which two are entirely extinct. Cephalopod molluscs, such as squid, cuttlefish, and octopuses, are among the most neurologically advanced of all invertebrates—and either the giant squid or the colossal squid is the largest known extant invertebrate species. The gastropods (snails, slugs and abalone) are by far the most diverse class and account for 80% of the total classified molluscan species.

The four most universal features defining modern molluscs are a soft body composed almost entirely of muscle, a mantle with a significant cavity used for breathing and excretion, the presence of a radula (except in bivalves), and the structure of the nervous system. Other than these common elements, molluscs express great morphological diversity, so many textbooks base their descriptions on a "hypothetical ancestral mollusc" (see image below). This has a single, "limpet-like" shell on top, which is made of proteins and chitin reinforced with calcium carbonate, and is secreted by a mantle covering the whole upper surface. The underside of the animal consists of a single muscular "foot".

Although molluscs are coelomates, the coelom tends to be small. The main body cavity is a hemocoel through which blood circulates; as such, their circulatory systems are mainly open. The "generalized" mollusc's feeding system consists of a rasping "tongue", the radula, and a complex digestive system in which exuded mucus and microscopic, muscle-powered "hairs" called cilia play various important roles. The generalized mollusc has two paired nerve cords, or three in bivalves. The brain, in species that have one, encircles the esophagus.

Most molluscs have eyes, and all have sensors to detect chemicals, vibrations, and touch. The simplest type of molluscan reproductive system relies on external fertilization, but more complex variations occur. Nearly all produce eggs, from which may emerge trochophore larvae, more complex veliger larvae, or miniature adults. The coelomic cavity is reduced. They have an open circulatory system and kidney-like organs for excretion.

Good evidence exists for the appearance of gastropods, cephalopods, and bivalves in the Cambrian period, 541–485.4 million years ago. However, the evolutionary history both of molluscs' emergence from the ancestral Lophotrochozoa and of their diversification into the well-known living and fossil forms are still subjects of vigorous debate among scientists.

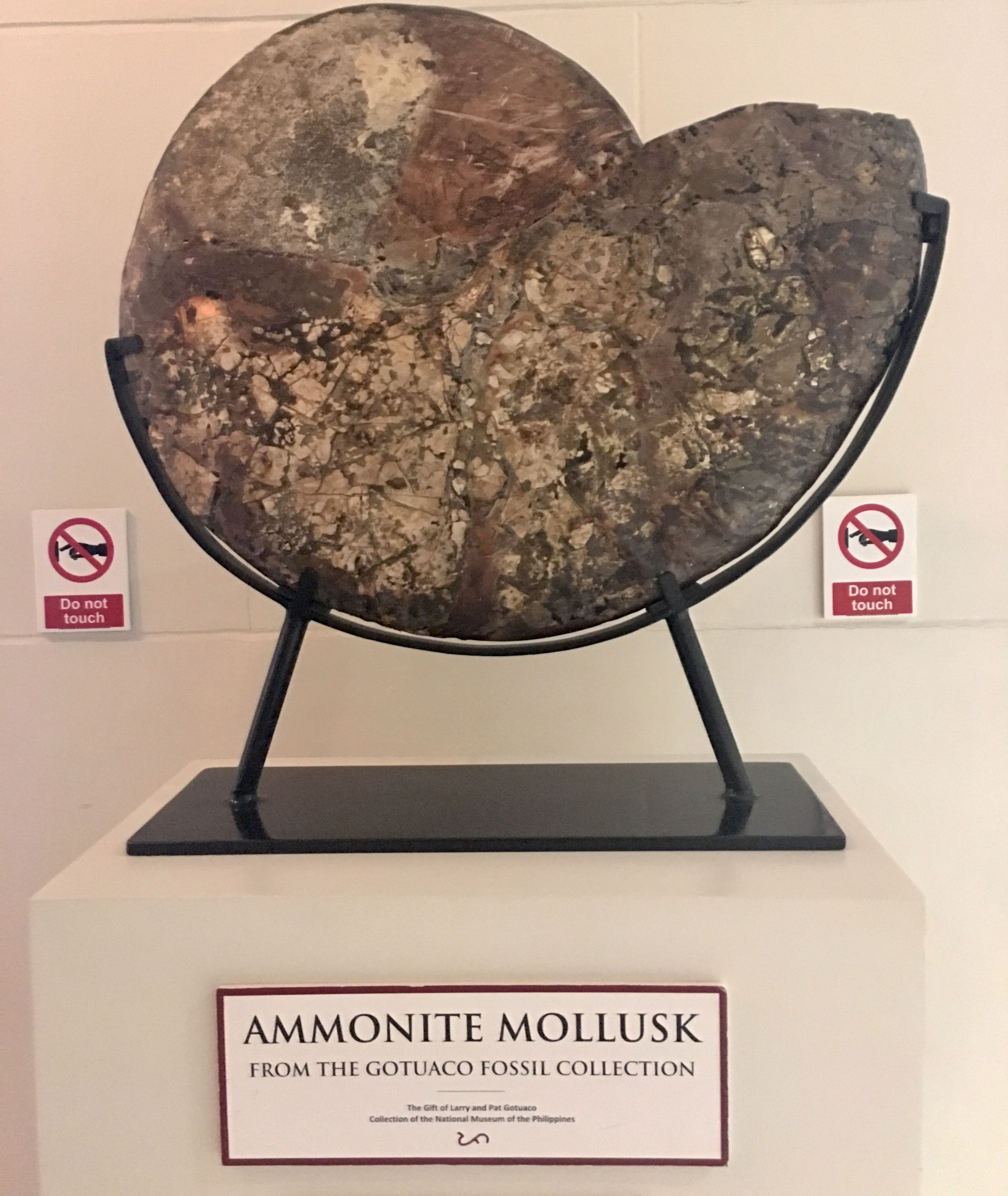
Fossilized ammonite displayed at the National Museum of the Philippines

Molluscs have been and still are an important food source for humans. Toxins that can accumulate in certain molluscs under specific conditions create a risk of food poisoning, and many jurisdictions have regulations to reduce this risk. Molluscs have, for centuries, also been the source of important luxury goods, notably pearls, mother of pearl, Tyrian purple dye, and sea silk. Their shells have also been used as money in some preindustrial societies.

A handful of mollusc species are sometimes considered hazards or pests for human activities. The bite of the blue-ringed octopus is often fatal, and that of Enteroctopus dofleini causes inflammation that can last over a month. Stings from a few species of large tropical cone shells of the family Conidae can also kill, but their sophisticated, though easily produced, venoms have become important tools in neurological research. Schistosomiasis (also known as bilharzia, bilharziosis, or snail fever) is transmitted to humans by water snail hosts, and affects about 200 million people. Snails and slugs can also be serious agricultural pests, and accidental or deliberate introduction of some snail species into new environments has seriously damaged some ecosystems.

== Etymology ==
The words mollusc and mollusk are both derived from the French mollusque, which originated from the post-classical Latin mollusca, from mollis, soft, first used by J. Jonston (Historiæ Naturalis, 1650) to describe a group comprising cephalopods. Molluscus is used in classical Latin as an adjective only with nux (nut) to describe a particular type of soft nut. The use of mollusca in biological taxonomy by Jonston and later Linnaeus may have been influenced by Aristotle's τὰ μαλάκια ta malákia (the soft ones; < μαλακός malakós "soft"), which he applied among other things to cuttlefish. The scientific study of molluscs is accordingly called malacology.

The name Molluscoida was formerly used to denote a division of the animal kingdom containing the brachiopods, bryozoans, and tunicates, the members of the three groups having been supposed to somewhat resemble the molluscs. As now known, Brachipoda, Bryozoa and Mollusca are all part of the Lophotrochozoa but have very little relation to the Tunicata, so the name Molluscoida has been abandoned.

== Definition ==
The most universal features of the body structure of molluscs are a mantle with a significant body cavity used for breathing and excretion, and the organization of the nervous system. Many have a calcareous shell.

Molluscs have developed such a varied range of body structures, finding synapomorphies (defining characteristics) to apply to all modern groups is difficult. The most general characteristic of molluscs is they are unsegmented and bilaterally symmetrical. The following are present in all modern molluscs:

- The dorsal part of the body wall is a mantle (or pallium) which secretes calcareous spicules, plates or shells. It overlaps the body with enough spare room to form a mantle cavity.
- The anus and genitals open into the mantle cavity.
- There are paired nerve cords.

Other characteristics that commonly appear in textbooks have significant exceptions:

	Whether characteristic is found in these classes of Molluscs						
Supposed universal Molluscan characteristic	Aplacophora	Polyplacophora	Monoplacophora	Gastropoda	Cephalopoda	Bivalvia	Scaphopoda
Radula, a rasping "tongue" with chitinous teeth	Absent in 20% of Neomeniomorpha	Yes	Yes	Yes	Yes	No	Internal, cannot extend beyond body
Broad, muscular foot	Reduced or absent	Yes	Yes	Yes	Modified into arms	Yes	Small, only at "front" end
Dorsal concentration of internal organs (visceral mass)	Not obvious	Yes	Yes	Yes	Yes	Yes	Yes
Large digestive ceca	No ceca in some Aplacophora	Yes	Yes	Yes	Yes	Yes	No
Large complex metanephridia ("kidneys")	None	Yes	Yes	Yes	Yes	Yes	Small, simple
One or more valves/shells	Primitive forms, yes; modern forms, no	Yes	Yes	Snails, yes; slugs, mostly yes (internal vestigial)	Octopuses, some (vestigial); cuttlefish, nautilus, squid, yes	Yes	Yes
Odontophore	Yes	Yes	Yes	Yes	Yes	No	Yes

== Diversity ==
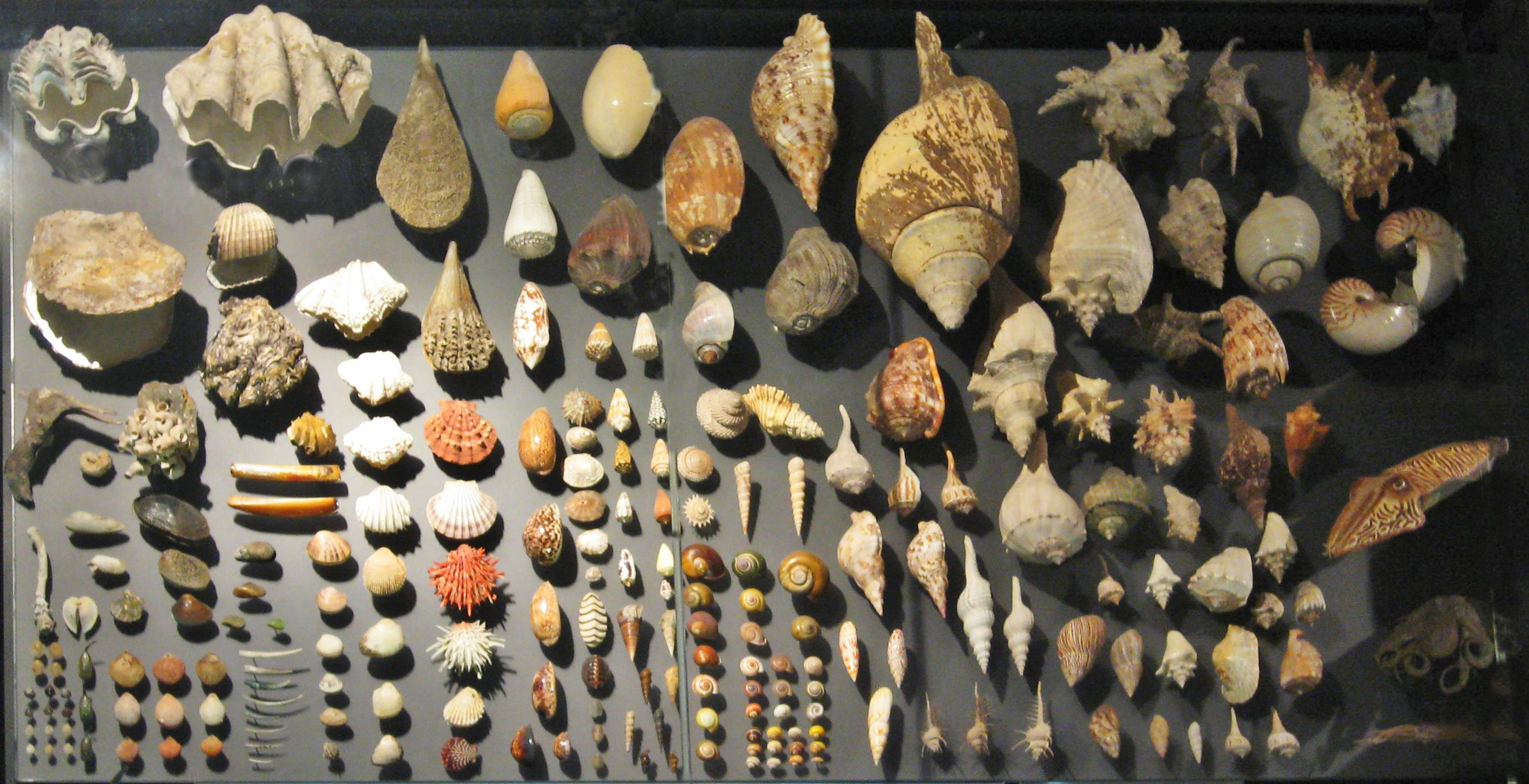
Diversity and variability of shells of molluscs on display

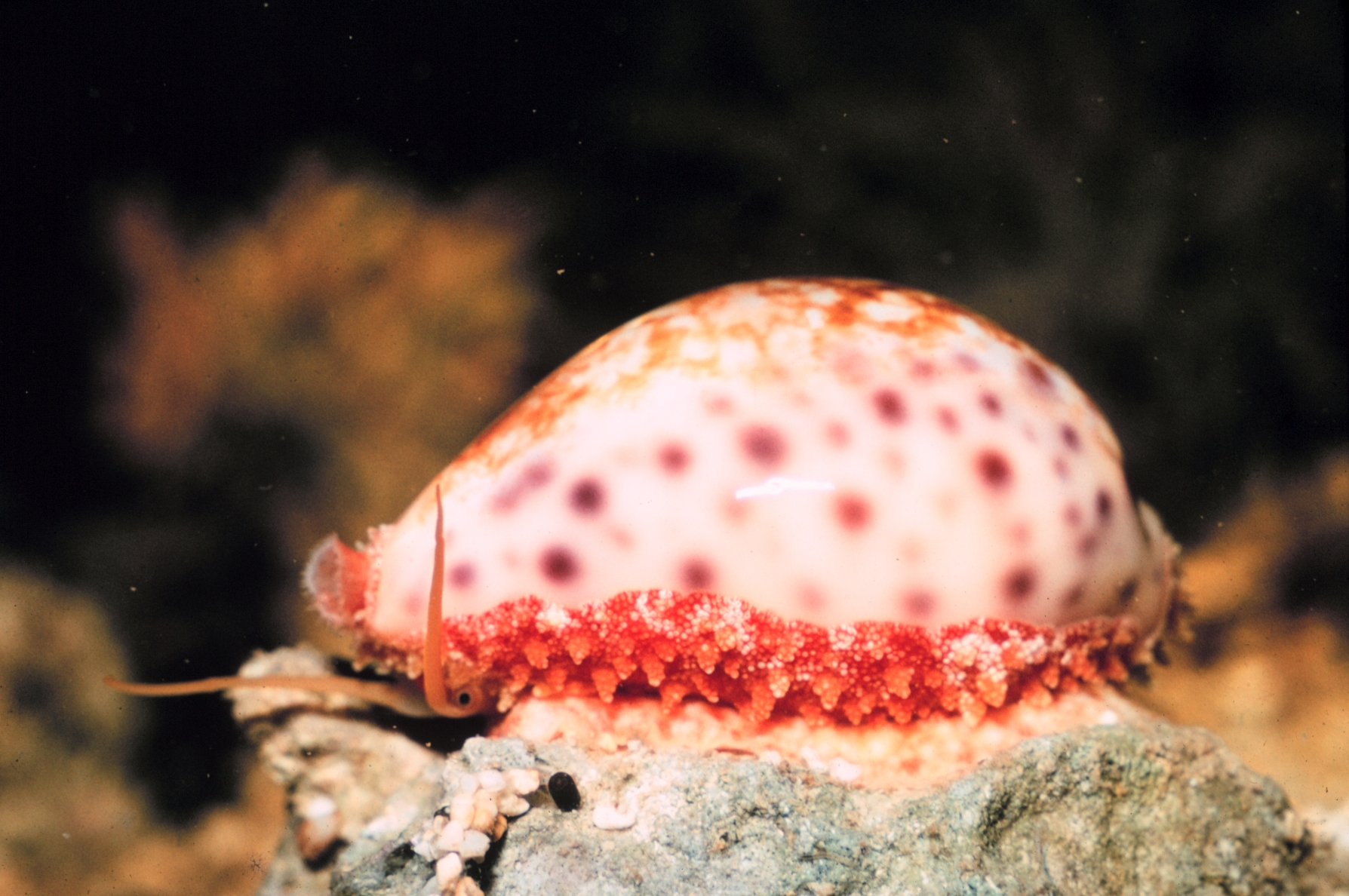
About 80% of all known mollusc species are gastropods (snails and slugs), including this cowry (a sea snail).

Estimates of accepted described living species of molluscs vary from 50,000 to a maximum of 120,000 species. The total number of described species is difficult to estimate because of unresolved synonymy. In 1969, David Nicol estimated the probable total number of living mollusc species at 107,000 of which were about 12,000 fresh-water gastropods and 35,000 terrestrial. The Bivalvia would comprise about 14% of the total and the other five classes less than 2% of the living molluscs. In 2009, Chapman estimated the number of described living mollusc species at 85,000. Haszprunar in 2001 estimated about 93,000 named species, which include 23% of all named marine organisms. Molluscs are second only to arthropods in numbers of living animal species—far behind the arthropods' 1,113,000 but well ahead of chordates' 52,000. About 200,000 living species in total are estimated, and 70,000 fossil species, although the total number of mollusc species ever to have existed, whether or not preserved, must be many times greater than the number alive today.

Molluscs have more varied forms than any other animal phylum. They include snails, slugs and other gastropods; clams and other bivalves; squids and other cephalopods; and other lesser-known but similarly distinctive subgroups. The majority of species still live in the oceans, from the seashores to the abyssal zone, but some form a significant part of the freshwater fauna and the terrestrial ecosystems. Molluscs are extremely diverse in tropical and temperate regions, but can be found at all latitudes. About 80% of all known mollusc species are gastropods. Cephalopoda such as squid, cuttlefish, and octopuses are among the most neurologically advanced of all invertebrates. The giant squid, which until recently had not been observed alive in its adult form, is one of the largest invertebrates, surpassed in weight but not in length by the colossal squid.

Freshwater and terrestrial molluscs appear exceptionally vulnerable to extinction. Estimates of the numbers of non-marine molluscs vary widely, partly because many regions have not been thoroughly surveyed. There is also a shortage of specialists who can identify all the animals in any one area to species. However, in 2004 the IUCN Red List of Threatened Species included nearly 2,000 endangered non-marine molluscs. For comparison, the great majority of mollusc species are marine, but only 41 of these appeared on the 2004 Red List. About 42% of recorded extinctions since the year 1500 are of molluscs, consisting almost entirely of non-marine species.

== Anatomy ==
Anatomical diagram of a hypothetical ancestral mollusc

Because of the great range of anatomical diversity among molluscs, many textbooks start the subject of molluscan anatomy by describing what is called an archi-mollusc, hypothetical generalized mollusc, or hypothetical ancestral mollusc (HAM) to illustrate the most common features found within the phylum. The depiction is visually rather similar to modern monoplacophorans.

The generalized mollusc is an unsegmented, bilaterally symmetrical animal and has a single, "limpet-like" shell on top. The shell is secreted by a mantle covering the upper surface. The underside consists of a single muscular "foot". The visceral mass, or visceropallium, is the soft, nonmuscular metabolic region of the mollusc. It contains the body organs.

=== Mantle and mantle cavity ===
The mantle cavity, a fold in the mantle, encloses a significant amount of space. It is lined with epidermis, and is exposed, according to habitat, to sea, fresh water or air. The cavity was at the rear in the earliest molluscs, but its position now varies from group to group. The anus, a pair of osphradia (chemical sensors) in the incoming "lane", the hindmost pair of gills and the exit openings of the nephridia (kidneys) known as "Organs of bojanus" and gonads (reproductive organs) are in the mantle cavity. The whole soft body of bivalves lies within an enlarged mantle cavity.

=== Shell ===
The mantle edge secretes a shell (secondarily absent in a number of taxonomic groups, such as the nudibranchs) that consists of mainly chitin and conchiolin (a protein hardened with calcium carbonate), except the outermost layer, which in almost all cases is all conchiolin (see periostracum). Molluscs never use phosphate to construct their hard parts, with the questionable exception of Cobcrephora. While most mollusc shells are composed mainly of aragonite, those gastropods that lay eggs with a hard shell use calcite (sometimes with traces of aragonite) to construct the eggshells.

The shell consists of three layers: the outer layer (the periostracum) made of organic matter, a middle layer made of columnar calcite, and an inner layer consisting of laminated calcite, often nacreous.

In some forms the shell contains openings. In abalone there are holes in the shell used for respiration and the release of egg and sperm, in the nautilus a string of tissue called the siphuncle goes through all the chambers, and the eight plates that make up the shell of chitons are penetrated with living tissue with nerves and sensory structures. The earliest-derived living mollusca, the Polyplacophora (chitons) and shell-less vermiform Aplacophora, remains contentious despite many developmental and molecular studies of these organisms. Both studies investigated molluscan phylogeny through synthesis of paleontological and neontological data, and the other being large and small-subunit nuclear rRna sequences. Another article describing the chitons, with their shells, this time, is one by D K Jacobs and others, where shell evolution of molluscs and chitons are examined to visualize the evolution of the chiton, from the Polyplacophora, to the Aplacophora, and others.

=== Foot ===
A 50-second video of snails (most likely Natica chemnitzi and Cerithium stercusmuscaram) feeding on the sea floor in the Gulf of California, Puerto Peñasco, Mexico

The body of a mollusc has a ventral muscular foot, which is adapted to different purposes (locomotion, grasping the substratum, burrowing or feeding) in different classes. The foot carries a pair of statocysts, which act as balance sensors. In gastropods, it secretes mucus as a lubricant to aid movement. In forms having only a top shell, such as limpets, the foot acts as a sucker attaching the animal to a hard surface, and the vertical muscles clamp the shell down over it; in other molluscs, the vertical muscles pull the foot and other exposed soft parts into the shell. In bivalves, the foot is adapted for burrowing into the sediment; in cephalopods it is used for jet propulsion, and the tentacles and arms are derived from the foot.

=== Circulatory system ===
Most molluscs' circulatory systems are mainly open, except for cephalopods, whose circulatory systems are closed. Although molluscs are coelomates, their coeloms are reduced to fairly small spaces enclosing the heart and gonads. The main body cavity is a hemocoel through which blood and coelomic fluid circulate and which encloses most of the other internal organs. These hemocoelic spaces act as an efficient hydrostatic skeleton. The blood of these molluscs contains the respiratory pigment hemocyanin as an oxygen-carrier. The heart consists of one or more pairs of atria (auricles), which receive oxygenated blood from the gills and pump it to the ventricle, which pumps it into the aorta (main artery), which is fairly short and opens into the hemocoel. The atria of the heart also function as part of the excretory system by filtering waste products out of the blood and dumping it into the coelom as urine. A pair of metanephridia ("little kidneys") to the rear of and connected to the coelom extracts any re-usable materials from the urine and dumps additional waste products into it, and then ejects it via tubes that discharge into the mantle cavity.

Exceptions to the above are the molluscs Planorbidae or ram's horn snails, which are air-breathing snails that use iron-based hemoglobin instead of the copper-based hemocyanin to carry oxygen through their blood.

=== Respiration ===
Most molluscs have only one pair of gills, or even only a singular gill. Generally, the gills are rather like feathers in shape, although some species have gills with filaments on only one side. They divide the mantle cavity so water enters near the bottom and exits near the top. Their filaments have three kinds of cilia, one of which drives the water current through the mantle cavity, while the other two help to keep the gills clean. If the osphradia detect noxious chemicals or possibly sediment entering the mantle cavity, the gills' cilia may stop beating until the unwelcome intrusions have ceased. Each gill has an incoming blood vessel connected to the hemocoel and an outgoing one to the heart.

=== Eating, digestion, and excretion ===
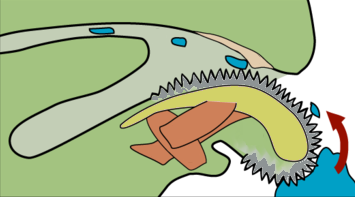
Snail radula at work = Food = Radula = Muscles = Odontophore "belt"

Molluscs use intracellular digestion. Most molluscs have muscular mouths with radulae, "tongues", bearing many rows of chitinous teeth, which are replaced from the rear as they wear out. The radula primarily functions to scrape bacteria and algae off rocks, and is associated with the odontophore, a cartilaginous supporting organ. The radula is unique to the molluscs and has no equivalent in any other animal.

Molluscs' mouths also contain glands that secrete slimy mucus, to which the food sticks. Beating cilia (tiny "hairs") drive the mucus towards the stomach, so the mucus forms a long string called a "food string".

At the tapered rear end of the stomach and projecting slightly into the hindgut is the prostyle, a backward-pointing cone of feces and mucus, which is rotated by further cilia so it acts as a bobbin, winding the mucus string onto itself. Before the mucus string reaches the prostyle, the acidity of the stomach makes the mucus less sticky and frees particles from it.

The particles are sorted by yet another group of cilia, which send the smaller particles, mainly minerals, to the prostyle so eventually they are excreted, while the larger ones, mainly food, are sent to the stomach's cecum (a pouch with no other exit) to be digested. The sorting process is by no means perfect.

Periodically, circular muscles at the hindgut's entrance pinch off and excrete a piece of the prostyle, preventing the prostyle from growing too large. The anus, in the part of the mantle cavity, is swept by the outgoing "lane" of the current created by the gills. Carnivorous molluscs usually have simpler digestive systems.

As the head has largely disappeared in bivalves, the mouth has been equipped with labial palps (two on each side of the mouth) to collect the detritus from its mucus.

=== Nervous system ===
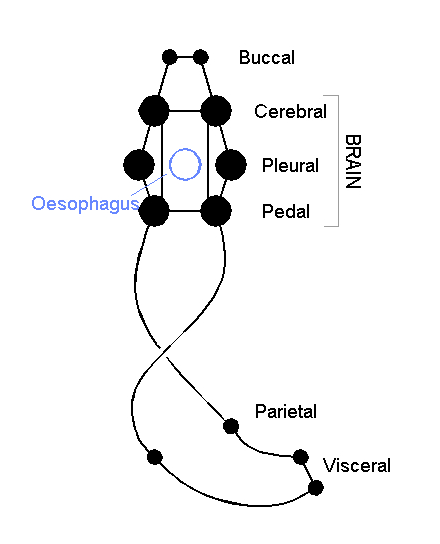
Simplified diagram of the mollusc nervous system

The cephalic molluscs have two pairs of main nerve cords organized around a number of paired ganglia, the visceral cords serving the internal organs and the pedal ones serving the foot. Most pairs of corresponding ganglia on both sides of the body are linked by commissures (relatively large bundles of nerves). The ganglia above the gut are the cerebral, the pleural, and the visceral, which are located above the esophagus (gullet). The pedal ganglia, which control the foot, are below the esophagus and their commissure and connectives to the cerebral and pleural ganglia surround the esophagus in a circumesophageal nerve ring or nerve collar.

The acephalic molluscs (i.e., bivalves) also have this ring but it is less obvious and less important. The bivalves have only three pairs of ganglia—cerebral, pedal, and visceral—with the visceral as the largest and most important of the three functioning as the principal center of "thinking". Some such as the scallops have eyes around the edges of their shells which connect to a pair of looped nerves and which provide the ability to distinguish between light and shadow.

=== Reproduction ===
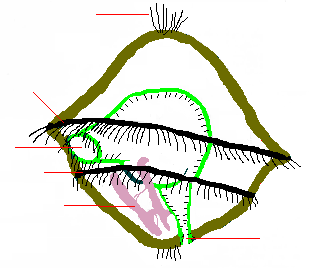
Trochophore larva

The simplest molluscan reproductive system relies on external fertilization, but with more complex variations. All produce eggs, from which may emerge trochophore larvae, more complex veliger larvae, or miniature adults. Two gonads sit next to the coelom, a small cavity that surrounds the heart, into which they shed ova or sperm. The nephridia extract the gametes from the coelom and emit them into the mantle cavity. Molluscs that use such a system remain of one sex all their lives and rely on external fertilization. Some molluscs use internal fertilization and/or are hermaphrodites, functioning as both sexes; both of these methods require more complex reproductive systems. C. obtusus is an endemic snail species of the Eastern Alps. There is strong evidence for self-fertilization in the easternmost snail populations of this species.

The most basic molluscan larva is a trochophore, which is planktonic and feeds on floating food particles by using the two bands of cilia around its "equator" to sweep food into the mouth, which uses more cilia to drive them into the stomach, which uses further cilia to expel undigested remains through the anus. New tissue grows in the bands of mesoderm in the interior, so the apical tuft and anus are pushed further apart as the animal grows. The trochophore stage is often succeeded by a veliger stage in which the prototroch, the "equatorial" band of cilia nearest the apical tuft, develops into the velum ("veil"), a pair of cilia-bearing lobes with which the larva swims. Eventually, the larva sinks to the seafloor and metamorphoses into the adult form. While metamorphosis is the usual state in molluscs, the cephalopods differ in exhibiting direct development: the hatchling is a 'miniaturized' form of the adult. The development of molluscs is of particular interest in the field of ocean acidification as environmental stress is recognized to affect the settlement, metamorphosis, and survival of larvae.

== Ecology ==
=== Feeding ===
Most molluscs are herbivorous, grazing on algae or filter feeders. For those grazing, two feeding strategies are predominant. Some feed on microscopic, filamentous algae, often using their radula as a 'rake' to comb up filaments from the sea floor. Others feed on macroscopic 'plants' such as kelp, rasping the plant surface with its radula. To employ this strategy, the plant has to be large enough for the mollusc to 'sit' on, so smaller macroscopic plants are not as often eaten as their larger counterparts. Filter feeders are molluscs that feed by straining suspended matter and food particles from water, typically by passing the water over their gills. Most bivalves are filter feeders, which can be measured through clearance rates. Research has demonstrated that environmental stress can affect the feeding of bivalves by altering the energy budget of organisms.

Cephalopods are primarily predatory, and the radula takes a secondary role to the jaws and tentacles in food acquisition. The monoplacophoran Neopilina uses its radula in the usual fashion, but its diet includes protists such as the xenophyophore Stannophyllum. Sacoglossan sea-slugs suck the sap from algae, using their one-row radula to pierce the cell walls, whereas dorid nudibranchs and some Vetigastropoda feed on sponges and others feed on hydroids. (An extensive list of molluscs with unusual feeding habits is available in the appendix of GRAHAM, A. (1955). "Molluscan diets". Journal of Molluscan Studies. 31 (3–4): 144.)

== Classification ==
Opinions vary about the number of classes of molluscs; for example, the table below shows seven living classes, and two extinct ones. Although they are unlikely to form a clade, some older works combine the Caudofoveata and Solenogastres into one class, the Aplacophora. Two of the commonly recognized "classes" are known only from fossils.

Class	Major organisms	Described living species	Distribution
Gastropoda	all snails and slugs including abalone, limpets, conch, nudibranchs, sea hares, sea butterflies	70,000	marine, freshwater, land
Bivalvia	clams, oysters, scallops, geoducks, mussels, rudists†	20,000	marine, freshwater
Polyplacophora	chitons	1,000	rocky tidal zone and seabed
Cephalopoda	squid, octopuses, cuttlefish, nautiluses, vampire squids, Spirula, belemnites†, ammonites†	900	marine
Scaphopoda	tusk shells	500	marine 6–7,000 metres (20–22,966 ft)
Aplacophora	worm-like molluscs	320	seabed 200–3,000 metres (660–9,840 ft)
Monoplacophora	ancient lineage of molluscs with cap-like shells	31	seabed 1,800–7,000 metres (5,900–23,000 ft); one species 200 metres (660 ft)
Rostroconchia†	fossils; probable ancestors of bivalves	extinct	marine
Helcionelloida†	fossils; snail-like molluscs such as Latouchella	extinct	marine

=== Phylogeny ===
- Lophotrochozoa
  - Brachiopods
  - - Mollusca
      - - - Bivalves
          - Monoplacophorans
            ("limpet-like", "living fossils")
          - - Scaphopods (tusk shells)
            - - Gastropods
                (snails, slugs, limpets, sea hares)
              - Cephalopods
                (nautiloids, ammonites, octopus, squid, etc.)
      - - Aplacophorans
          (spicule-covered, worm-like)
        - Polyplacophorans (chitons)
    - - † Halwaxiids
        - Wiwaxia
        - Halkieria
      - † Orthrozanclus
    - † Odontogriphus

A possible "family tree" of molluscs (2007). Does not include annelid worms as the analysis concentrated on fossilizable "hard" features.

The phylogeny (evolutionary "family tree") of molluscs is a controversial subject. In addition to the debates about whether Kimberella and any of the "halwaxiids" were molluscs or closely related to molluscs, debates arise about the relationships between the classes of living molluscs. In fact, some groups traditionally classified as molluscs may have to be redefined as distinct but related.

Molluscs are generally regarded as members of the Lophotrochozoa, a group defined by having trochophore larvae and, in the case of living Lophophorata, a feeding structure called a lophophore. The other members of the Lophotrochozoa are the annelid worms and seven marine phyla. The diagram on the right summarizes a phylogeny presented in 2007 without the annelid worms.

Because the relationships between the members of the family tree are uncertain, it is difficult to identify the features inherited from the last common ancestor of all molluscs. For example, it is uncertain whether the ancestral mollusc was metameric (composed of repeating units)—if it was, that would suggest an origin from an annelid-like worm. Scientists disagree about this: Giribet and colleagues concluded, in 2006, the repetition of gills and of the foot's retractor muscles were later developments, while in 2007, Sigwart concluded the ancestral mollusc was metameric, and it had a foot used for creeping and a "shell" that was mineralized. In one particular branch of the family tree, the shell of conchiferans is thought to have evolved from the spicules (small spines) of aplacophorans; but this is difficult to reconcile with the embryological origins of spicules.

The molluscan shell appears to have originated from a mucus coating, which eventually stiffened into a cuticle. This would have been impermeable and thus forced the development of more sophisticated respiratory apparatus in the form of gills. Eventually, the cuticle would have become mineralized,using the same genetic machinery (engrailed) as most other bilaterian skeletons. The first mollusc shell almost certainly was reinforced with the mineral aragonite.

Classification into higher taxa for molluscan classes has been and remains problematic. Numerous different clades have been proposed but few have received strong support. Traditionally, Mollusca is split into two subphyla, Conchifera and Aculifera, based on the presence of a shell. The "Testaria" hypothesis is similar, but includes chitons with the rest of the conchiferans. Some studies completely reject the proposal, instead favoring a "Serialia" hypothesis which classifies chitons and monoplacophorans as closely related.

- Mollusca
  - Aculifera
    - Polyplacophora
    - Aplacophora
      - Caudofoveata
      - Solenogastres
  - Conchifera
    - Monoplacophora
    - Cephalopoda
    - - Bivalvia
      - Gastropoda
      - Scaphopoda

The Aculifera-Conchifera hypothesis

- Mollusca
  - Variopoda
    - Scaphopoda
    - - Caudofoveata
      - Cephalopoda
      - Solenogastres
  - Dorsochoncha
    - Bivalvia
    - Gastropoda
    - Serialia
      - Monoplacophora
      - Polyplacophora

The "Serialia" hypothesis

Morphological analyses tend to recover a conchiferan clade that receives less support from molecular analyses, although these results also lead to unexpected paraphylies, for instance scattering the bivalves throughout all other mollusc groups.

However, an analysis in 2009 using both morphological and molecular phylogenetics comparisons concluded the molluscs are not monophyletic; in particular, Scaphopoda and Bivalvia are both separate, monophyletic lineages unrelated to the remaining molluscan classes; the traditional phylum Mollusca is polyphyletic, and it can only be made monophyletic if scaphopods and bivalves are excluded. A 2010 analysis recovered the traditional conchiferan and aculiferan groups, and showed molluscs were monophyletic, demonstrating that available data for solenogastres was contaminated. Current molecular data are insufficient to constrain the molluscan phylogeny, and since the methods used to determine the confidence in clades are prone to overestimation, it is risky to place too much emphasis even on the areas of which different studies agree. Rather than eliminating unlikely relationships, the latest studies add new permutations of internal molluscan relationships, even bringing the conchiferan hypothesis into question.

== Evolutionary history ==
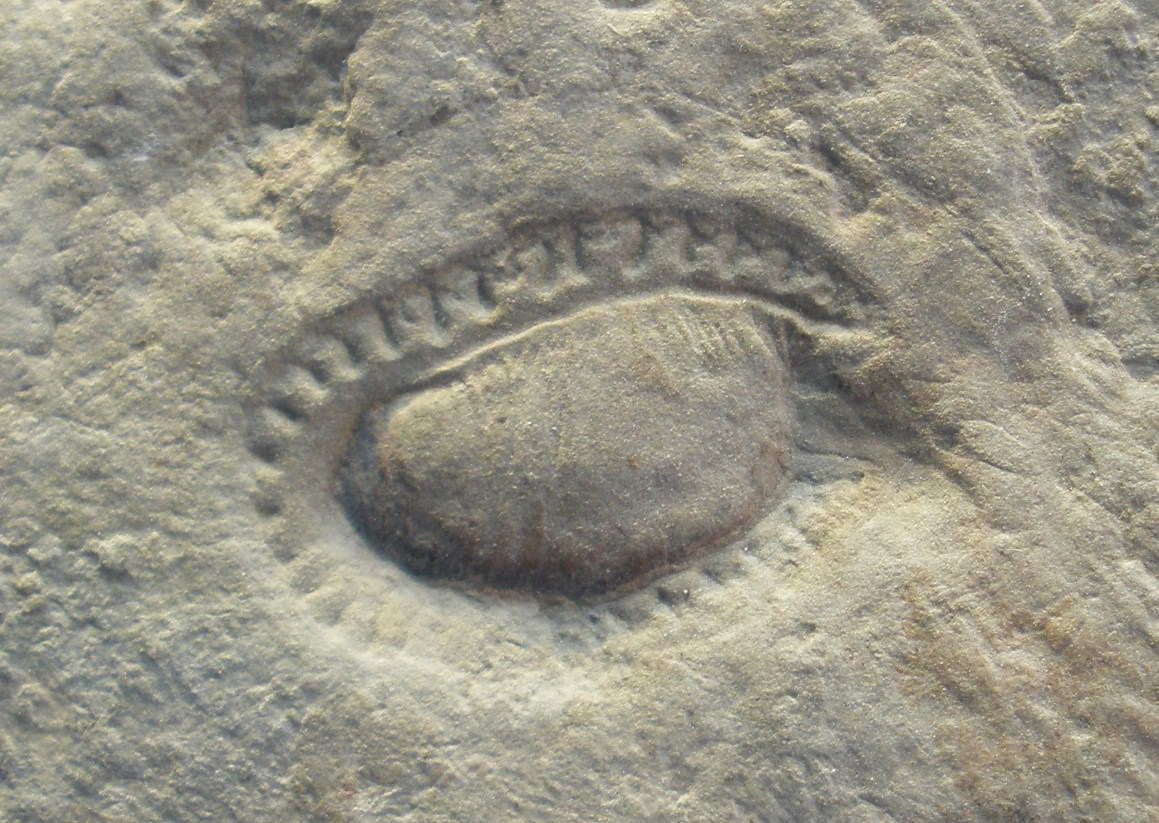
The enigmatic Kimberella quadrata (fossil pictured) from the Ediacaran has been described as being "mollusc-like" because of its features which are shared with modern day molluscs.

Good evidence exists for the appearance of gastropods (e.g., Aldanella), cephalopods (e.g., Plectronoceras) and bivalves (Pojetaia, Fordilla) towards the middle of the Cambrian period, c. 500 million years ago, though arguably each of these may belong only to the stem lineage of their respective classes. However, the evolutionary history both of the emergence of molluscs from the ancestral group Lophotrochozoa, and of their diversification into the well-known living and fossil forms, is still vigorously debated.

Debate occurs about whether some Ediacaran and Early Cambrian fossils really are molluscs. Kimberella, from about 555 million years ago, has been described by some paleontologists as "mollusc-like", but others are unwilling to go further than "probable bilaterian", if that.

There is an even sharper debate about whether Wiwaxia, from about 505 million years ago, was a mollusc, and much of this centers on whether its feeding apparatus was a type of radula or more similar to that of some polychaete worms. Nicholas Butterfield, who opposes the idea that Wiwaxia was a mollusc, has written that earlier microfossils from 515 to 510 million years ago are fragments of a genuinely mollusc-like radula. This appears to contradict the concept that the ancestral molluscan radula was mineralized.

The tiny helcionellid fossil Yochelcionella is thought to be an early mollusc.

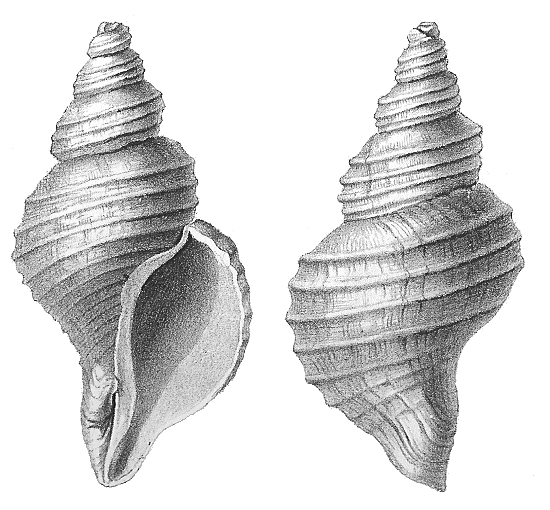
Spirally coiled shells appear in many gastropods.

However, the helcionellids, which first appear over 540 million years ago in Early Cambrian rocks from Siberia and China, are thought to be early molluscs with rather snail-like shells. Shelled molluscs therefore predate the earliest trilobites. Although most helcionellid fossils are only a few millimeters long, specimens a few centimeters long have also been found, most with more limpet-like shapes. The tiny specimens have been suggested to be juveniles and the larger ones adults.

Some analyses of helcionellids concluded these were the earliest gastropods. However, other scientists are not convinced these Early Cambrian fossils show clear signs of the torsion that identifies modern gastropods twists the internal organs so the anus lies above the head.

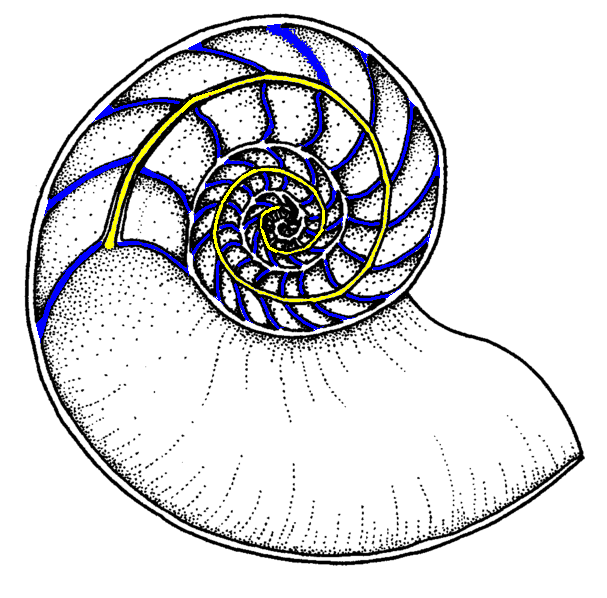
Septa and siphuncle in nautiloid shell

Volborthella, some fossils of which predate 530 million years ago, was long thought to be a cephalopod, but discoveries of more detailed fossils showed its shell was not secreted, but built from grains of the mineral silicon dioxide (silica), and it was not divided into a series of compartments by septa as those of fossil shelled cephalopods and the living Nautilus are. Volborthella's classification is uncertain. The Middle Cambrian fossil Nectocaris was interpreted as a cephalopod with 2 arms and no shell by some researchers, but it is later reinterpreted as relative of modern chaetognaths (arrow worms). The Late Cambrian fossil Plectronoceras is now thought to be the earliest undisputed cephalopod fossil, as its shell had septa and a siphuncle, a strand of tissue that Nautilus uses to remove water from compartments it has vacated as it grows, and which is also visible in fossil ammonite shells. However, Plectronoceras and other early cephalopods crept along the seafloor instead of swimming, as their shells contained a "ballast" of stony deposits on what is thought to be the underside, and had stripes and blotches on what is thought to be the upper surface. All cephalopods with external shells except the nautiloids became extinct by the end of the Cretaceous period 65 million years ago. However, the shell-less Coleoidea (squid, octopus, cuttlefish) are abundant today.

The Early Cambrian fossils Fordilla and Pojetaia are regarded as bivalves. "Modern-looking" bivalves appeared in the Ordovician period, 488 to 443 million years ago. One bivalve group, the rudists, became major reef-builders in the Cretaceous, but became extinct in the Cretaceous–Paleogene extinction event. Even so, bivalves remain abundant and diverse.

The Hyolitha are a class of extinct animals with a shell and operculum that may be molluscs. Authors who suggest they deserve their own phylum do not comment on the position of this phylum in the tree of life.

== Human interaction ==
For millennia, molluscs have been a source of food for humans, as well as important luxury goods, notably pearls, mother of pearl, Tyrian purple dye, sea silk, and chemical compounds. Their shells have also been used as a form of currency in some preindustrial societies. Some species of molluscs can bite or sting humans, and some have become agricultural pests.

=== Uses by humans ===
Molluscs, especially bivalves such as clams and mussels, have been an important food source since at least the advent of anatomically modern humans, and this has often resulted in overfishing. Other commonly eaten molluscs include octopuses and squids, whelks, oysters, and scallops. In 2005, China accounted for 80% of the global mollusc catch, netting almost 11,000,000 tonnes (11,000,000 long tons; 12,000,000 short tons). Within Europe, France remained the industry leader. Some countries regulate importation and handling of molluscs and other seafood, mainly to minimize the poison risk from toxins that can sometimes accumulate in the animals.

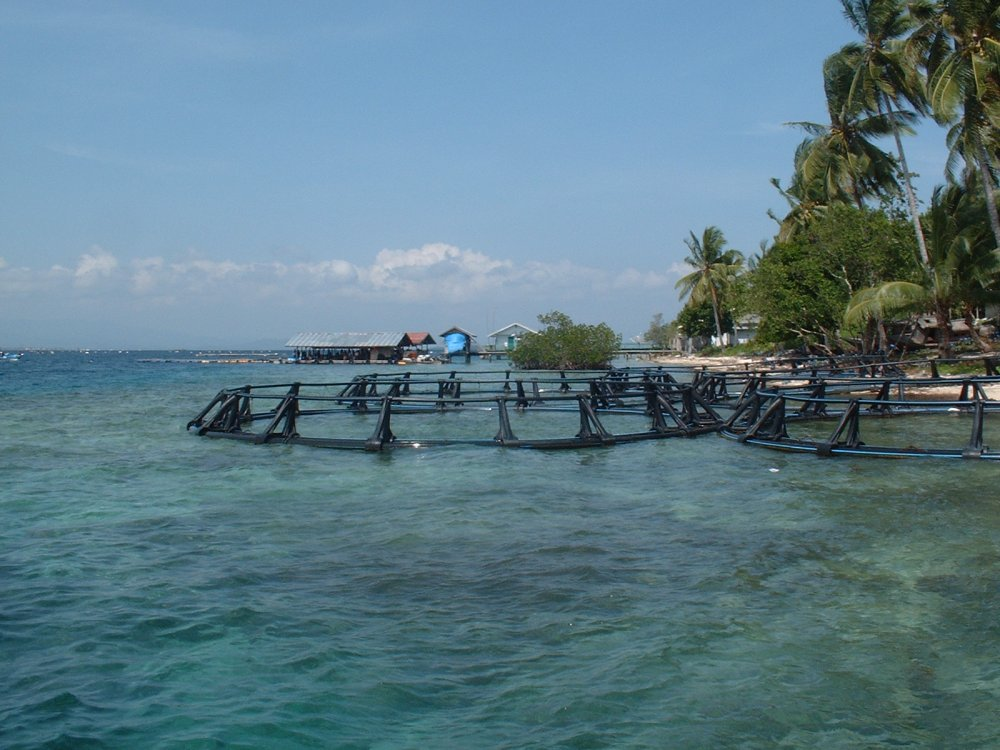
Saltwater pearl oyster farm in Seram, Indonesia

Most molluscs with shells can produce pearls, but only the pearls of bivalves and some gastropods, whose shells are lined with nacre, are valuable. The best natural pearls are produced by marine pearl oysters, Pinctada margaritifera and Pinctada mertensi, which live in the tropical and subtropical waters of the Pacific Ocean. Natural pearls form when a small foreign object gets stuck between the mantle and shell.

The two methods of culturing pearls insert either "seeds" or beads into oysters. The "seed" method uses grains of ground shell from freshwater mussels, and overharvesting for this purpose has endangered several freshwater mussel species in the southeastern United States. The pearl industry is so important in some areas, significant sums of money are spent on monitoring the health of farmed molluscs.

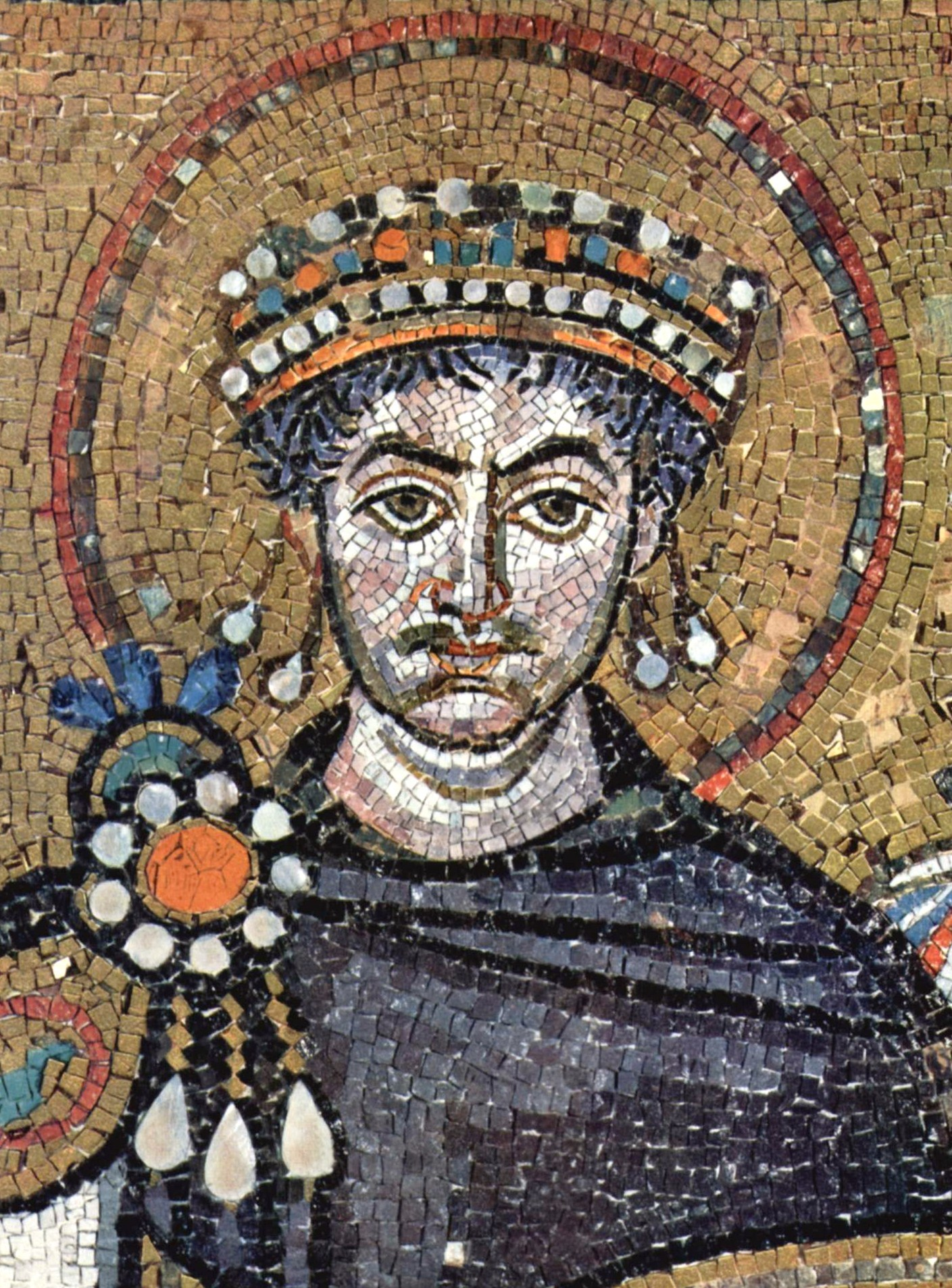
Byzantine Emperor Justinian I clad in Tyrian purple and wearing numerous pearls

Other luxury and high-status products were made from molluscs. Tyrian purple, made from the ink glands of murex shells, "fetched its weight in silver" in the fourth century BC, according to Theopompus. The discovery of large numbers of Murex shells on Crete suggests the Minoans may have pioneered the extraction of "imperial purple" during the Middle Minoan period in the 20th–18th centuries BC, centuries before the Tyrians. Sea silk is a fine, rare, and valuable fabric produced from the long silky threads (byssus) secreted by several bivalve molluscs, particularly Pinna nobilis, to attach themselves to the sea bed. Procopius, writing on the Persian wars circa 550 CE, "stated that the five hereditary satraps (governors) of Armenia who received their insignia from the Roman Emperor were given chlamys (or cloaks) made from lana pinna. Apparently, only the ruling classes were allowed to wear these chlamys."

Mollusc shells, including those of cowries, were used as a kind of money (shell money) in several preindustrial societies. However, these "currencies" generally differed in important ways from the standardized government-backed and -controlled money familiar to industrial societies. Some shell "currencies" were not used for commercial transactions, but mainly as social status displays at important occasions, such as weddings. When used for commercial transactions, they functioned as a means of exchange similar to money in ordinary business transactions, a tradable good whose value differed from place to place, often as a result of difficulties in transport, and which was vulnerable to incurable inflation if more efficient transport or "goldrush" behavior appeared.

==== Bioindicators ====
Bivalve molluscs are used as bioindicators to monitor the health of aquatic environments in both fresh water and the marine environments. Their population status or structure, physiology, behaviour or the level of contamination with elements or compounds can indicate the state of contamination status of the ecosystem. They are particularly useful since they are sessile so that they are representative of the environment where they are sampled or placed. Potamopyrgus antipodarum is used by some water treatment plants to test for estrogen-mimicking pollutants from industrial agriculture. Several species of mollusca have been used as bioindicators of environmental stresses that can cause DNA damage. These species include the American oyster Crassostrea virginica, zebra mussels (Dreissena polymorpha) and the blue mussel Mytilus edulis.

=== Harm to humans ===
==== Stings and bites ====
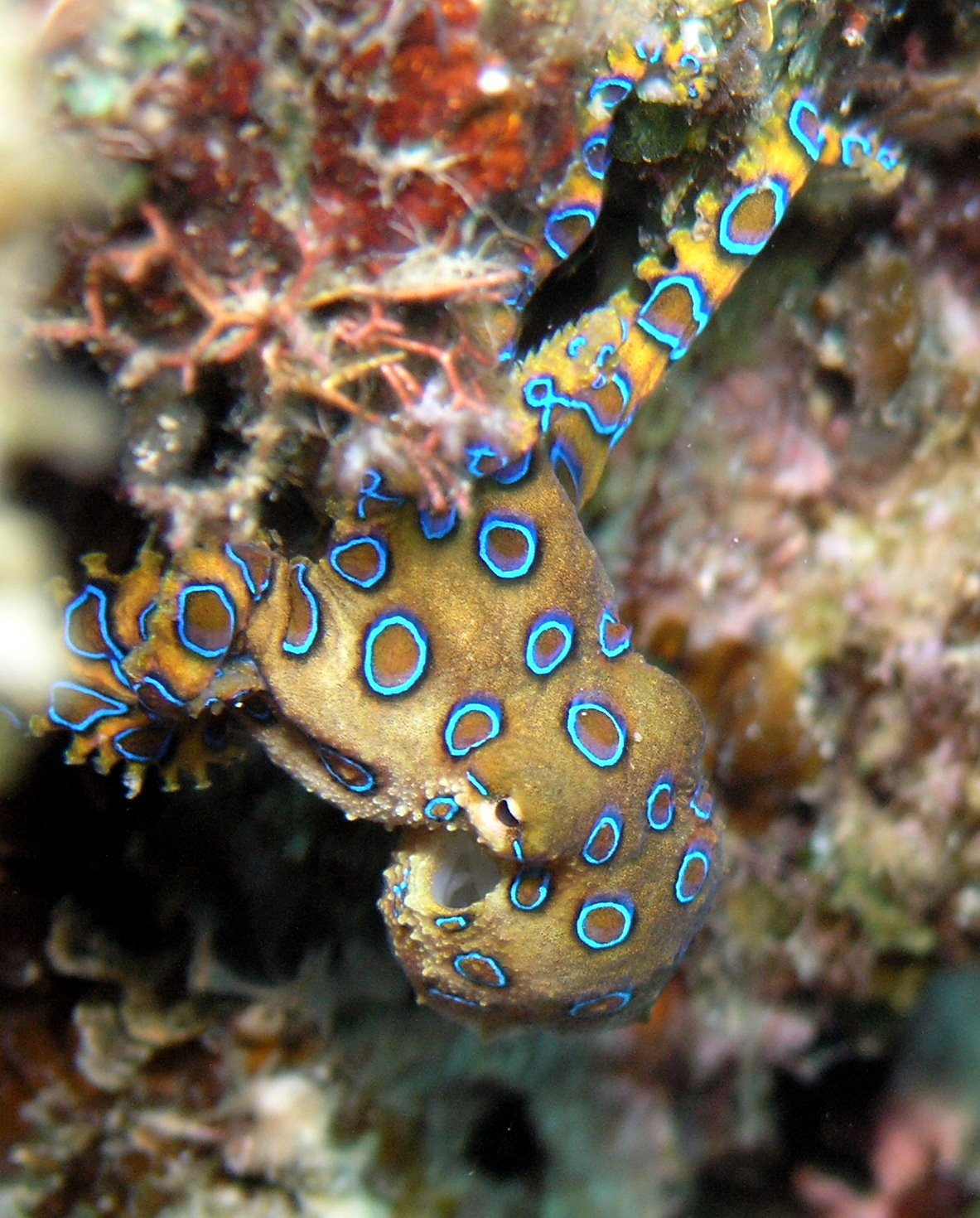
The blue-ringed octopus's rings are a warning signal; this octopus is alarmed, and its bite can kill.

Some molluscs sting or bite, but deaths from mollusc venoms total less than 10% of those from jellyfish stings.

All octopuses are venomous, but only a few species pose a significant threat to humans. Blue-ringed octopuses in the genus Hapalochlaena, which live around Australia and New Guinea, bite humans only if severely provoked, but their venom kills 25% of human victims. Another tropical species, Octopus apollyon, causes severe inflammation that can last for over a month even if treated correctly, and the bite of Octopus rubescens can cause necrosis that lasts longer than one month if untreated, and headaches and weakness persisting for up to a week even if treated.

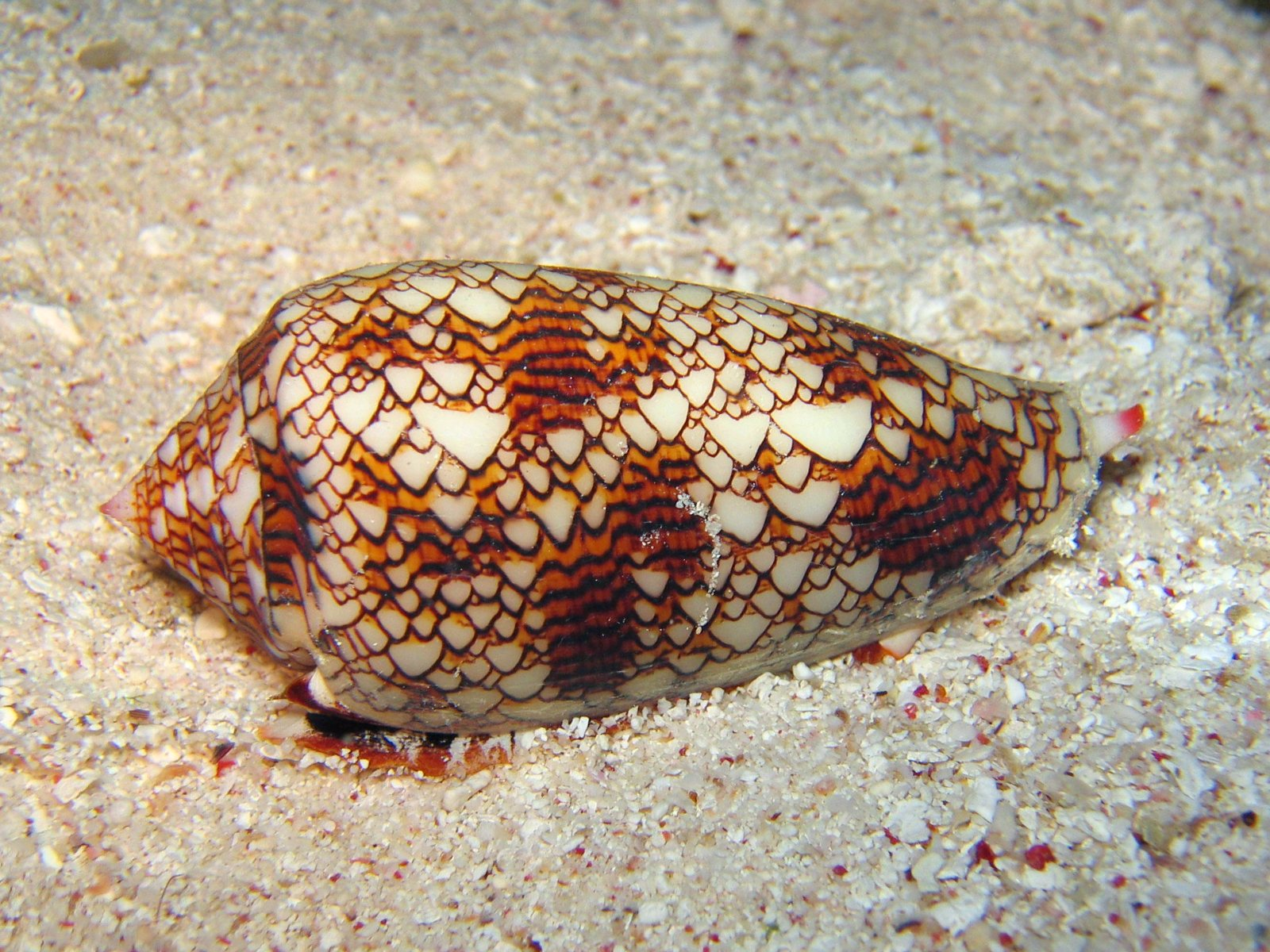
Live cone snails can be dangerous to shell collectors, but are useful to neurology researchers.

All species of cone snails are venomous and can sting painfully when handled, although many species are too small to pose much of a risk to humans, and only a few fatalities have been reliably reported. Their venom is a complex mixture of toxins, some fast-acting and others slower but deadlier. The effects of individual cone-shell toxins on victims' nervous systems are so precise as to be useful tools for research in neurology, and the small size of their molecules makes it easy to synthesize them.

==== Disease vectors ====
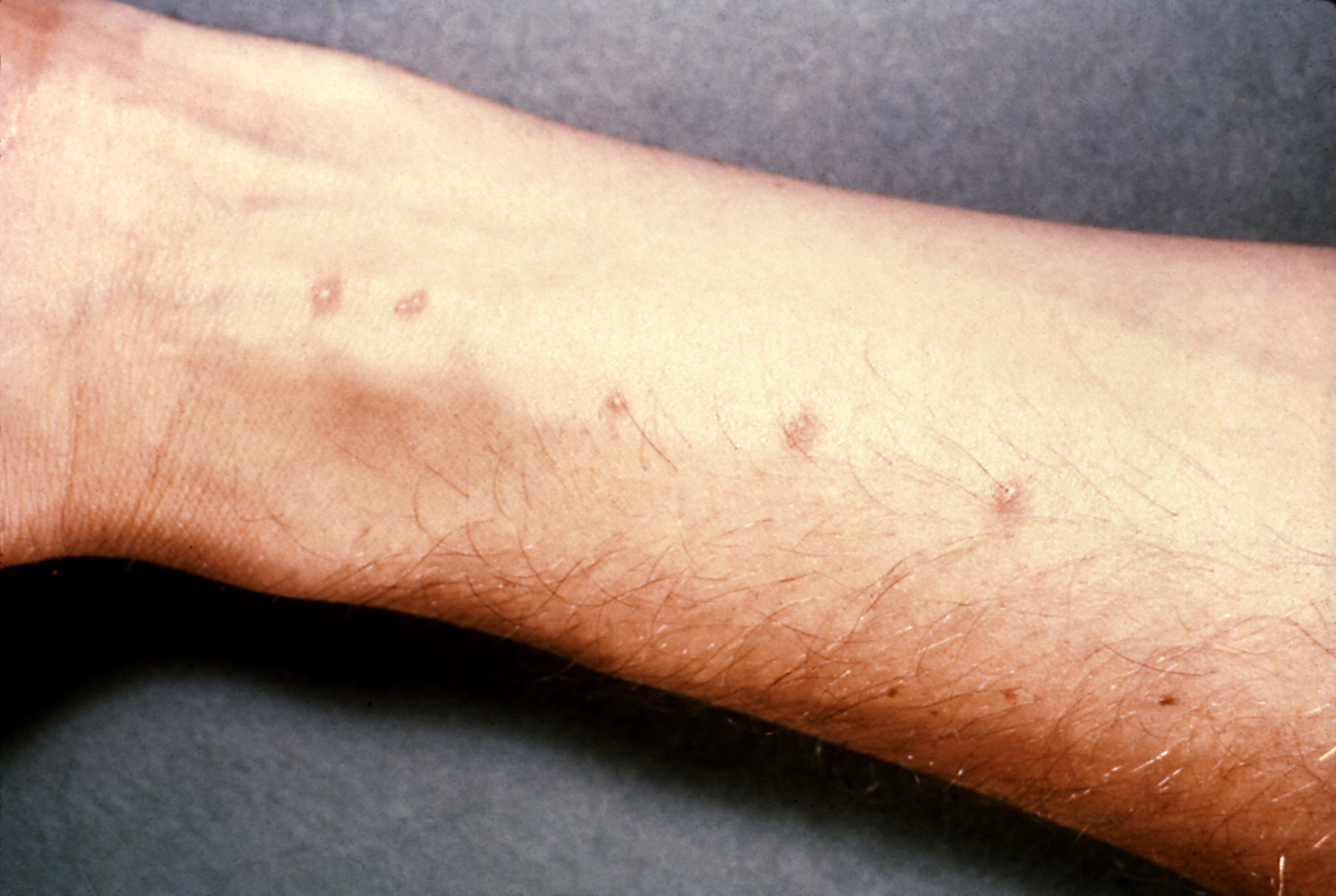
Skin vesicles created by the penetration of Schistosoma (Source: CDC)

Schistosomiasis (also known as bilharzia, bilharziosis or snail fever), a disease caused by the fluke worm Schistosoma, is "second only to malaria as the most devastating parasitic disease in tropical countries. An estimated 200 million people in 74 countries are infected with the disease—100 million in Africa alone." The parasite has 13 known species, two of which infect humans. The parasite itself is not a mollusc, but all the species have freshwater snails as intermediate hosts.

==== Pests ====
Some species of molluscs, particularly certain snails and slugs, can be serious crop pests, and when introduced into new environments, can unbalance local ecosystems. One such pest, the giant African snail Achatina fulica, has been introduced to many parts of Asia, as well as to many islands in the Indian Ocean and Pacific Ocean. In the 1990s, this species reached the West Indies. Attempts to control it by introducing the predatory snail Euglandina rosea proved disastrous, as the predator ignored Achatina fulica and went on to extirpate several native snail species instead.

== See also ==
- Land snail
- Sea slug
- Sea snail
