= Olivella watermani =

Scientific classification
- Kingdom: Animalia
- Phylum: Mollusca
- Class: Gastropoda
- Subclass: Caenogastropoda
- Order: Neogastropoda
- Family: Olividae
- Genus: Olivella
- Species: O. watermani

Binomial name
- Olivella watermani McGinty, 1940

Species of gastropod

Olivella watermani is a species of small sea snail, marine gastropod mollusk in the subfamily Olivellinae, in the family Olividae, the olives. Species in the genus Olivella are commonly called dwarf olives.

== Description ==
Original description: "Shell solid, whorls about 4, with a short conic spire; suture canaliculate, deep and narrow; columellar area with a strong raised callus, an upper and lower set of columellar plications; lip about four fifths the length of shell, with upper third of aperture closed off by the heavy callus. Color white, with three rather obscure suffused bands of pink, orange or yellow spots on the last whorl.
Length 10.5 mm., width 4.6 mm. Length 9.6 mm., width 4.5 mm."

== Distribution ==
Locus typicus: "Dredged off Palm Beach, Florida, in 80 fathoms."
