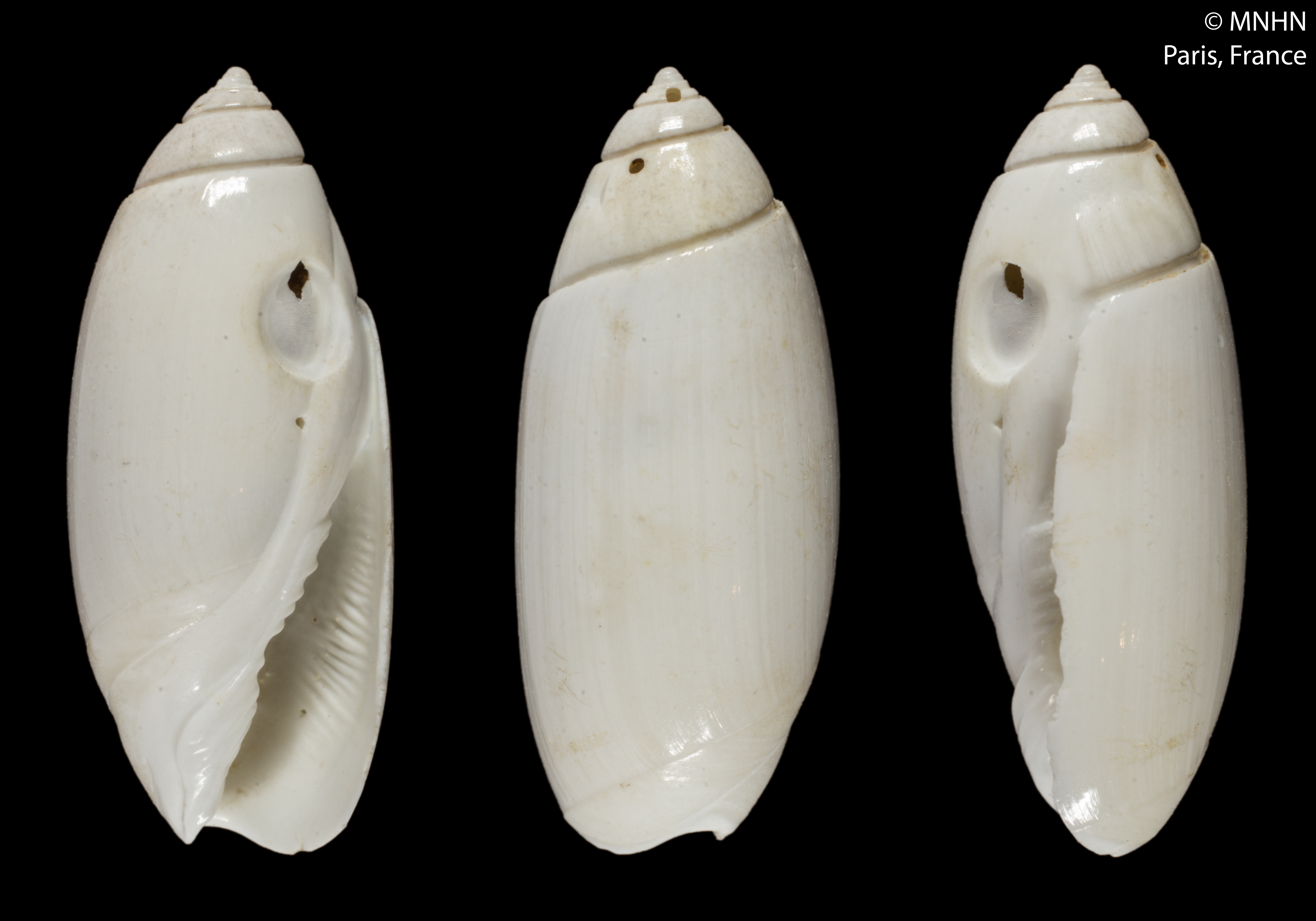
- Shell of Olivella dolichomorpha (holotype at MNHN, Paris)

Scientific classification
- Kingdom: Animalia
- Phylum: Mollusca
- Class: Gastropoda
- Subclass: Caenogastropoda
- Order: Neogastropoda
- Family: Olividae
- Genus: Olivella
- Species: O. dolichomorpha

Binomial name
- Olivella dolichomorpha Paulmier, 2007

= Olivella dolichomorpha =

Species of gastropod

Olivella dolichomorpha is a species of small sea snail, marine gastropod mollusk in the subfamily Olivellinae, in the family Olividae, the olives. Species in the genus Olivella are commonly called dwarf olives.

== Description ==
The length of the shell attains 14.1 mm (0.56 in).

== Distribution ==
This marine species occurs off Martinique.
