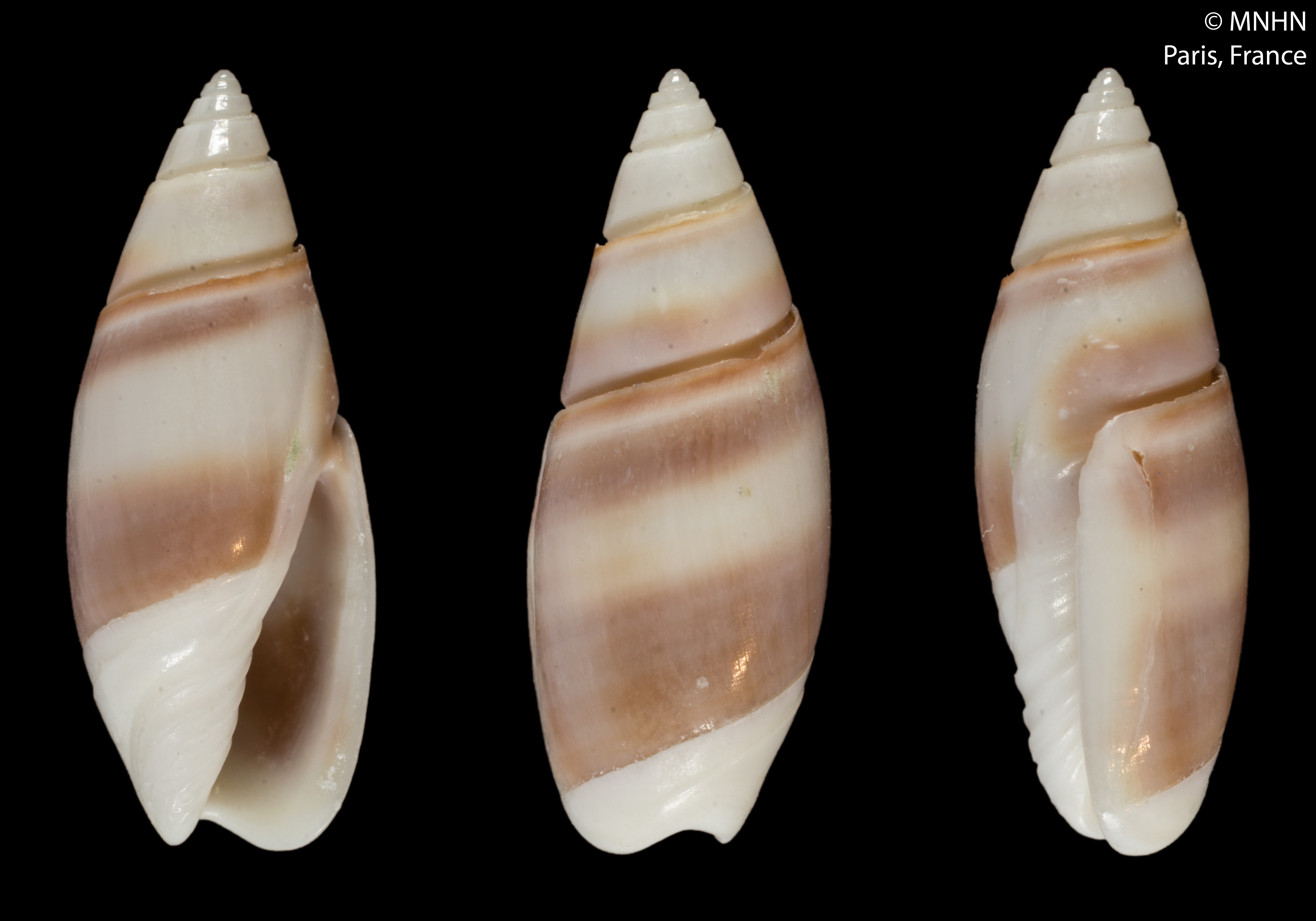
- Shell of Olivella zanoeta (syntype at MNHN, Paris)

Scientific classification
- Kingdom: Animalia
- Phylum: Mollusca
- Class: Gastropoda
- Subclass: Caenogastropoda
- Order: Neogastropoda
- Family: Olividae
- Genus: Olivella
- Species: O. zanoeta

Binomial name
- Olivella zanoeta (Duclos, 1835)

= Olivella zanoeta =

Species of gastropod

Olivella zanoeta is a species of small sea snail, marine gastropod mollusk in the subfamily Olivellinae, in the family Olividae, the olives. Species in the genus Olivella are commonly called dwarf olives.

== Distribution ==
This marine species occurs off Japan.
