= Olivella drangai =

Scientific classification
- Kingdom: Animalia
- Phylum: Mollusca
- Class: Gastropoda
- Subclass: Caenogastropoda
- Order: Neogastropoda
- Family: Olividae
- Genus: Olivella
- Species: O. drangai

Binomial name
- Olivella drangai Olsson, 1956

Species of gastropod

Olivella drangai is a species of small sea snail, marine gastropod mollusk in the subfamily Olivellinae, in the family Olividae, the olives. Species in the genus Olivella are commonly called dwarf olives.

== Description ==
Original description: "Shell small (length about 10 mm.), relatively thin, white or yellowish-brown, subtranslucent except for the fasciole which is opaque white, Spire elevated, evenly tapering and composed of about 6½ whorls, the nuclear one quite small. Sutures are narrowly grooved with the anterior margin slightly overhanging, the sutural junction underneath generally showing through the thin texture of the shell as a faint line. Parietal acllus well developed, heaviest near the end of the aperture, extending more thinly above to the suture. Pillar structure consists of several small lirations extending upward along the inner lip about hall way, internally the pillar is deeply excavated by corrosion. Length 10 mm., diameter 3.9 mm."

== Distribution ==
Locus typicus: "Galapagos, San Cristobal Island, Bahia Wreck."
