= Olivella defiorei =

Scientific classification
- Kingdom: Animalia
- Phylum: Mollusca
- Class: Gastropoda
- Subclass: Caenogastropoda
- Order: Neogastropoda
- Family: Olividae
- Genus: Olivella
- Species: O. defiorei

Binomial name
- Olivella defiorei Klappenbach, 1964

Species of gastropod

Olivella defiorei is a species of small sea snail, marine gastropod mollusk in the subfamily Olivellinae, in the family Olividae, the olives. Species in the genus Olivella are commonly called dwarf olives.

== Description ==
Shell size 10 mm.

== Distribution ==
Western Atlantic Ocean: Espírito Santo, Brazil at 1-2 meters depth, on sand.
