= Olivella riverae =

Scientific classification
- Kingdom: Animalia
- Phylum: Mollusca
- Class: Gastropoda
- Subclass: Caenogastropoda
- Order: Neogastropoda
- Family: Olividae
- Genus: Olivella
- Species: O. riverae

Binomial name
- Olivella riverae Olsson, 1956

Species of gastropod

Olivella riverae is a species of small sea snail, marine gastropod mollusk in the subfamily Olivellinae, in the family Olividae, the olives. Species in the genus Olivella are commonly called dwarf olives.

== Description ==
"Shell of medium size (length about 12 mm.), relatively thin, spindle-shaped, with an elevated spire of about 5 whorls, the body-whorl large, subelliptical. The parietal callus is developed as a thin enamel spread along the inner lip of the aperture and passing above the end of the aperture but spread so lightly that it does not obscure the color of the penultimate whorl beneath. Pillar structure weak, forming a low ridge along the columella, finely lirate below. Aperture effuse in front, the notch of the siphonal canal wide, the outer lip thin. Color is a mottled brown or rich mahogany formed by the coalescence of small blotches of color on a gray-yellow base which at the suture form into short, crooked lines. Fasciole is similarly colored brown, the upper band yellow, with brown spots. Aperture has the parietal callus often white, the interior of outer lip a deep brown. Length 12.7 mm., diameter 5.1 mm.".
