= Olivella bitleri =

Scientific classification
- Kingdom: Animalia
- Phylum: Mollusca
- Class: Gastropoda
- Subclass: Caenogastropoda
- Order: Neogastropoda
- Family: Olividae
- Genus: Olivella
- Species: O. bitleri

Binomial name
- Olivella bitleri Olsson, 1956

Species of gastropod

Olivella bitleri is a species of small sea snail, marine gastropod mollusk in the subfamily Olivellinae, in the family Olividae, the olives. Species in the genus Olivella are commonly called dwarf olives.

== Description ==
Original description: "Shell of medium size (length up to about 16 mm.), with an elevated sharp spire about half the total length. Whorls about 8, of which the initial 2 belong to a small glassy nucleus. Sutures grooved, the bordering edge of the whorl in front, sharp and slightly overhanging. On the type, the parietal callus is colored a rich brown and extends upward past the end of the aperture but not quite reaching to the suture, the callus being thickest at the end of the aperture and just above it, the general surface of the penultimate whorl being covered and colored by its enamel. Coloration variable; the type has the body-whorl between the suture and the fasciole a steel-gray which forms a broad band between the deep, rich brown of the penultimate whorl above and a narrow brown band below which colors the upper band along the fasciole; other shells have the surface colored a light-brown formed by a sprinkling of small spots. Upper band of the fasciole usually brown, the lower part white. Sutures edged below with a lighter colored zone with small, broken, brown lines. Interior of outer lip a dark brown. Radula typical for the subgenus, the ribbon of medium length, with about 28 rows of teeth, the rachidian tooth with about 20 cusps, the central pair largest and in the specimen examined, the ventral pair of cusps have 2 secondary ones between them.
Length 15.2 mm., diameter 5.8 mm."

== Distribution ==
Locus typicus: "Panama Bay, Panama.

Tropical Eastern Pacific realm. Galapagos province. Galapagos."
