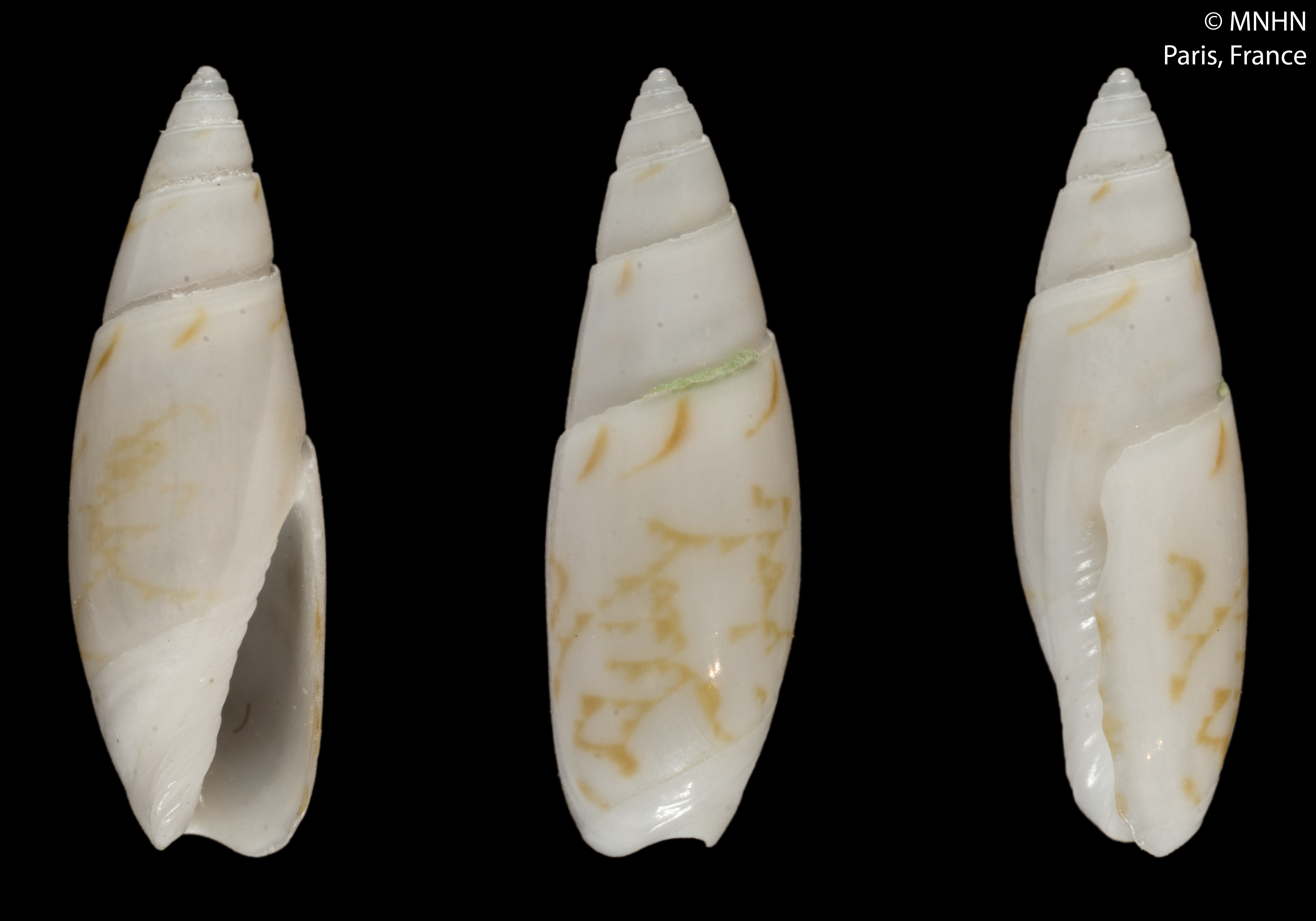
- Olivella floralia Duclos, 1844

Scientific classification
- Kingdom: Animalia
- Phylum: Mollusca
- Class: Gastropoda
- Subclass: Caenogastropoda
- Order: Neogastropoda
- Superfamily: Olivoidea
- Family: Olividae
- Subfamily: Olivellinae
- Genus: Olivella; Swainson, 1831

Synonyms
- Dactylidia H. Adams & A. Adams, 1853; † Lamprodoma Swainson, 1840 junior subjective synonym; Oliva (Olivella) Swainson, 1831 (original rank); Oliva (Olivina) d'Orbigny, 1841; Olivella (Anasser) Absalão & Pimenta, 2003; Olivella (Dactylidella) Woodring, 1928; Olivella (Dactylidia) H. Adams & A. Adams, 1853; † Olivella (Lamprodoma) Swainson, 1840 junior subjective synonym; Olivella (Macgintiella) Olsson, 1956 ·; Olivella (Niteoliva) Olsson, 1956· accepted, alternate representation; Olivella (Olivella) Swainson, 1831 ·; Olivella (Olivina) d'Orbigny, 1841; Olivina d'Orbigny, 1841

= Olivella (gastropod) =

Genus of gastropods

Olivella, common name the dwarf olives, is a genus of small predatory sea snails, marine gastropod molluscs in the subfamily Olivellinae of the family Olividae, the olives. Olivella is the type genus of the family.

== Description ==
Adults in the Olivella species are usually quite small, hence the genus has the common name "dwarf olive". Species of Oliva are usually larger, but there are exceptions.

The shell of Olivella usually has a keel-like twist at the anterior end of the columella. The wall above it may be concave or have deep furrows. The inner lip can sometimes show a deep callus, and in many cases this extends over the parietal wall to the end of the aperture. This callus formation may extend to the spire but leave the suture open. Most species of Olivella have a thin, chitinous operculum, but this operculum is lacking in Olivella nivea, as is also the case in species of Oliva.

(Described as Lamprodoma) The spire is acuminate, elevated with the suture canaliculated. The inner lip is simple posteriorly, regularly and closely plicate at the fore part of the columella. The callus is moderate and restricted.

(Described as Dactylidia) The spire is obtuse, covered with a thick deposit of enamel. The aperture is narrow and plicate. The inner lip has a large, thickened callus, produced at the hind part, and covering and concealing the spire.

== Species ==
Species in the genus Olivella include:

- Olivella acteocina Olsson, 1956
- Olivella alba (Marrat In Sowerby, 1871)
- Olivella albina Paulmier, 2015
- Olivella altatae Burch & Campbell, 1963
- Olivella amblia Watson, 1882
- Olivella anazora (Duclos, 1835)
- Olivella ankeli Diaz & Gotting, 1990
- Olivella arionata Absalão, 2000
- Olivella aureobalteata Kuroda & Habe, 1971
- Olivella aureocincta Carpenter, 1857
- Olivella barbenthos Recourt, 1989
- Olivella biminiensis Petuch, 2002
- Olivella bitleri Olsson, 1956
- Olivella borealis Golikov, 1967
- Olivella broggi Olsson, 1956
- Olivella bullula (Reeve, 1850) - bubble dwarf olive
- Olivella careorugula Absalão & Pimenta, 2003
- † Olivella clanzigi Lozouet 1992
- Olivella cocosensis Olsson, 1956
- Olivella coensis Mansfield, 1930
- Olivella columellaris (G.B. Sowerby I, 1825)
- Olivella compta (Marrat, 1871)
- Olivella costulata Paulmier, 2007
- Olivella cymatilis S. S. Berry, 1963
- Olivella dama (Wood, 1828)
- Olivella decorata Paulmier, 2015
- Olivella defiorei Klappenbach, 1964
- Olivella diodocus (Marrat, 1871)
- Olivella dolichomorpha Paulmier, 2007
- Olivella drangai Olsson, 1956
- Olivella ephamilla Watson, 1882
- Olivella esther (Duclos, 1835)
- Olivella exilis (Marrat, 1871)
- Olivella fimbriata
- Olivella fletcherae S. S. Berry, 1958
- Olivella floralia (Duclos, 1853) - rice olive
- Olivella formicacorsii Klappenbach, 1962
- Olivella fortunei (Marrat, 1871)
- Olivella fulgurata A. Adams & Reeve, 1850
- Olivella fundarugata Weisbord, 1962
- Olivella fuscocincta Dall, 1889
- Olivella gaylordi Ford, 1894
- Olivella gracilis (Broderip & Sowerby, 1828)
- Olivella guayaquilensis Bartsch, 1928
- Olivella guildingii (Reeve, 1850)
- Olivella hyalina Raven & Recourt, 2018
- Olivella hyphala Absalão & Pimenta, 2003
- Olivella inconspicua (C.B. Adams, 1852)
- Olivella intermedia Paulmier, 2015
- Olivella intorta Carpenter, 1857
- Olivella inusta G. B. Sowerby III, 1915
- Olivella japonica Pilsbry, 1910
- Olivella kifos Macsotai & Campos, 2001
- Olivella klappenbachi Absalão & Pimenta, 2003
- Olivella lactea (Marrat, 1871)
- Olivella lanceolata (Reeve, 1850)
- Olivella lepta (Duclos, 1835)
- Olivella lindae Petuch, 1992: nomen nudum
- Olivella lineolata
- Olivella macgintyi Olsson, 1956
- Olivella mandarina (Duclos, 1835)
- Olivella marginelloides Paulmier, 2007
- Olivella marmosa Olsson & McGinty, 1958
- Olivella mayabe Espinosa & Ortega, 1998
- Olivella mica (Duclos, 1835): nomen dubium
- † Olivella microstriata Raven & Recourt, 2018
- Olivella micula (Marrat, 1871)
- Olivella miliacea (Marrat, 1871)
- Olivella miliola (d'Orbigny, 1842)
- Olivella millepunctata (Duclos, 1835)
- Olivella minuscula Paulmier, 2015
- Olivella minuta (Link, 1807) - minute dwarf olive
- Olivella miriadina (Duclos, 1835)
- Olivella moorei Abbott, 1951
- Olivella morrisoni Olsson, 1956
- Olivella mutica (Say, 1822) - variable dwarf olive
- Olivella myrmecoon Dall, 1912
- Olivella nana (Lamarck, 1811)
- Olivella nivea (Gmelin, 1791) - snowy dwarf olive
- Olivella nota (Marrat, 1871)
- Olivella olssoni Altena, 1971
- Olivella orejasmirandai Klappenbach, 1986
- Olivella oteroi Bermejo, 1979
- Olivella parva T. S. Oldroyd, 1921
- Olivella pedroana (Conrad, 1856)
- Olivella perplexa Olsson, 1956
- Olivella peterseni Olsson, 1956
- Olivella plana (Marrat, 1871)
- Olivella poppei Bozzetti, 1998
- † Olivella prefloralia Olsson & Harbison, 1953
- Olivella puelcha (Duclos, 1835)
- Olivella pulchella (Duclos, 1835)
- Olivella pulchra (Marrat, 1871)
- Olivella pulicaria (Marrat, 1871)
- Olivella pura (Reeve, 1850)
- Olivella pusilla (Marrat, 1871) - tiny dwarf olive
- Olivella rehderi Olsson, 1956
- Olivella riosi Klappenbach, 1991
- Olivella riverae Olsson, 1956
- Olivella rosolina (Duclos, 1835)
- Olivella rotunda Dall, 1889
- Olivella rubra (Marrat, 1871) (uncertain)
- Olivella rufifasciatus
- Olivella santacruzence Castellanos, 1965 & Fernández, 1965
- Olivella scurra (Marrat, 1871)
- Olivella semistriata (Gray, 1839)
- Olivella signata (Lischke, 1869)
- Olivella sphoni Burch & Campbell, 1963
- Olivella spreta Gould, 1861
- Olivella spretoides Yokoyama, 1922
- Olivella stegeri Olsson, 1956
- Olivella steveni Burch & Campbell, 1963
- Olivella tabulata Dall, 1889
- Olivella tehuelcha (Duclos, 1835)
- Olivella tergina (Duclos, 1835)
- Olivella thompsoni Olsson, 1956
- Olivella tunquina (Duclos, 1835)
- Olivella versicolor (Marrat, 1871)
- Olivella vitilia Watson, 1882
- Olivella volutella (Lamarck, 1811)
- Olivella volutelloides (Marrat, 1871)
- Olivella walkeri S. S. Berry, 1958
- Olivella watermani McGinty, 1940
- Olivella zanoeta (Duclos, 1835)
- Olivella zenopira (Duclos, 1835)
- Olivella zonalis (Lamarck, 1811)

Species brought into synonymy

- Olivella adelae Olsson, 1956: synonym of Olivella lactea (Marrat, 1871)
- Olivella alectona (Duclos, 1835) - San Pedro dwarf olive: synonym of Callianax alectona (Duclos, 1835)
- Olivella amoni Sterba & Lorenz, 2005: synonym of Janoliva amoni (Sterba & Lorenz, 2005)
- Olivella apicalis Kay, 1979: synonym of Ancillina apicalis (Kay, 1979)
- Olivella australis Tenison-Woods, 1878: synonym of Parviterebra brazieri (Angas, 1875)
- Olivella baetica Carpenter, 1864 - beatic dwarf olive: synonym of Callianax alectona (Duclos, 1835)
- Olivella biplicata (G. B. Sowerby I, 1825) - purple dwarf olive: synonym of Callianax biplicata (G. B. Sowerby I, 1825)
- Olivella columba (Duclos, 1835): synonym of Olivella esther (Duclos, 1835)
- Olivella dealbata (Reeve, 1850) - whitened dwarf olive: synonym of Olivella mica (Duclos, 1835)
- Olivella microspira Paulmier, 2007: synonym of Olivella miliola (d'Orbigny, 1842)
- Olivella millepunctata Duclos, 1840: synonym of Olivancillaria millepunctata (Duclos, 1840)
- Olivella monilifera (Reeve, 1850): synonym of Olivella mica (Duclos, 1835)
- Olivella paxillus Reeve, 1850: synonym of Oliva nitidula Duclos, 1835
- Olivella petiolita (Duclos, 1835): synonym of Olivella minuta (Link, 1807)
- Olivella plata (Ihering, 1909): synonym of Olivella puelcha (Duclos, 1835)
- Olivella purpurata Swainson, 1831: synonym of Olivella dama (W. Wood, 1828)
- Olivella simplex Pease, 1868: synonym of Olivellopsis simplex (Pease, 1868)
- Olivella striga (Reeve, 1850): synonym of Callianax strigata (Reeve, 1850)
- Olivella verriauxii (Duclos, 1857): synonym of Olivella minuta (Link, 1807)
