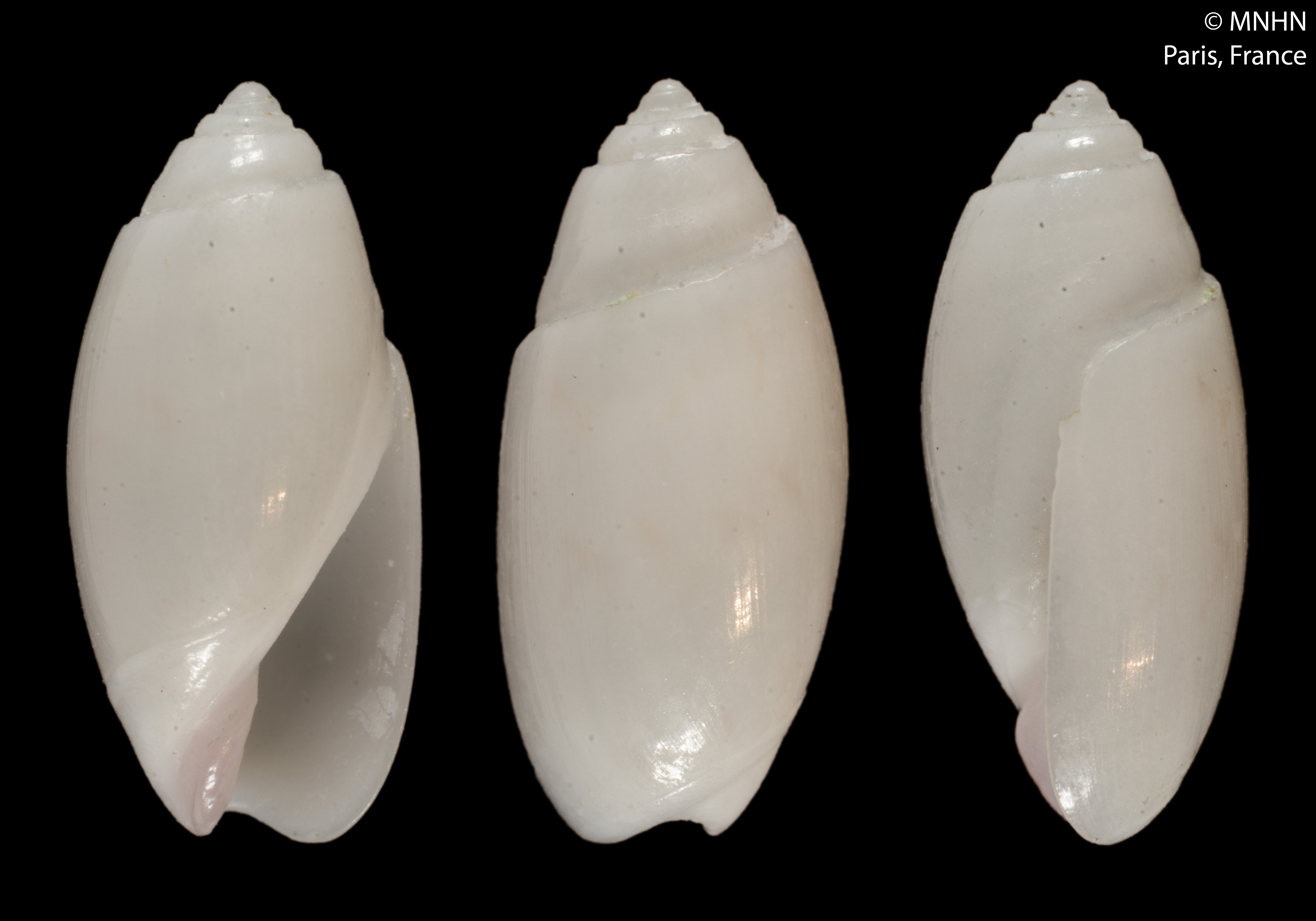
- Olivella rosolina

Scientific classification
- Kingdom: Animalia
- Phylum: Mollusca
- Class: Gastropoda
- Subclass: Caenogastropoda
- Order: Neogastropoda
- Family: Olividae
- Genus: Olivella
- Species: O. rosolina

Binomial name
- Olivella rosolina (Duclos, 1835)

Synonyms
- Oliva rosolina Duclos, 1835 (original combination)

= Olivella rosolina =

Species of gastropod

Olivella rosolina is a species of small sea snail, marine gastropod mollusk in the subfamily Olivellinae, in the family Olividae, the olives. Species in the genus Olivella are commonly called dwarf olives.

== Distribution ==
This marine species occurs off the Antilles.
