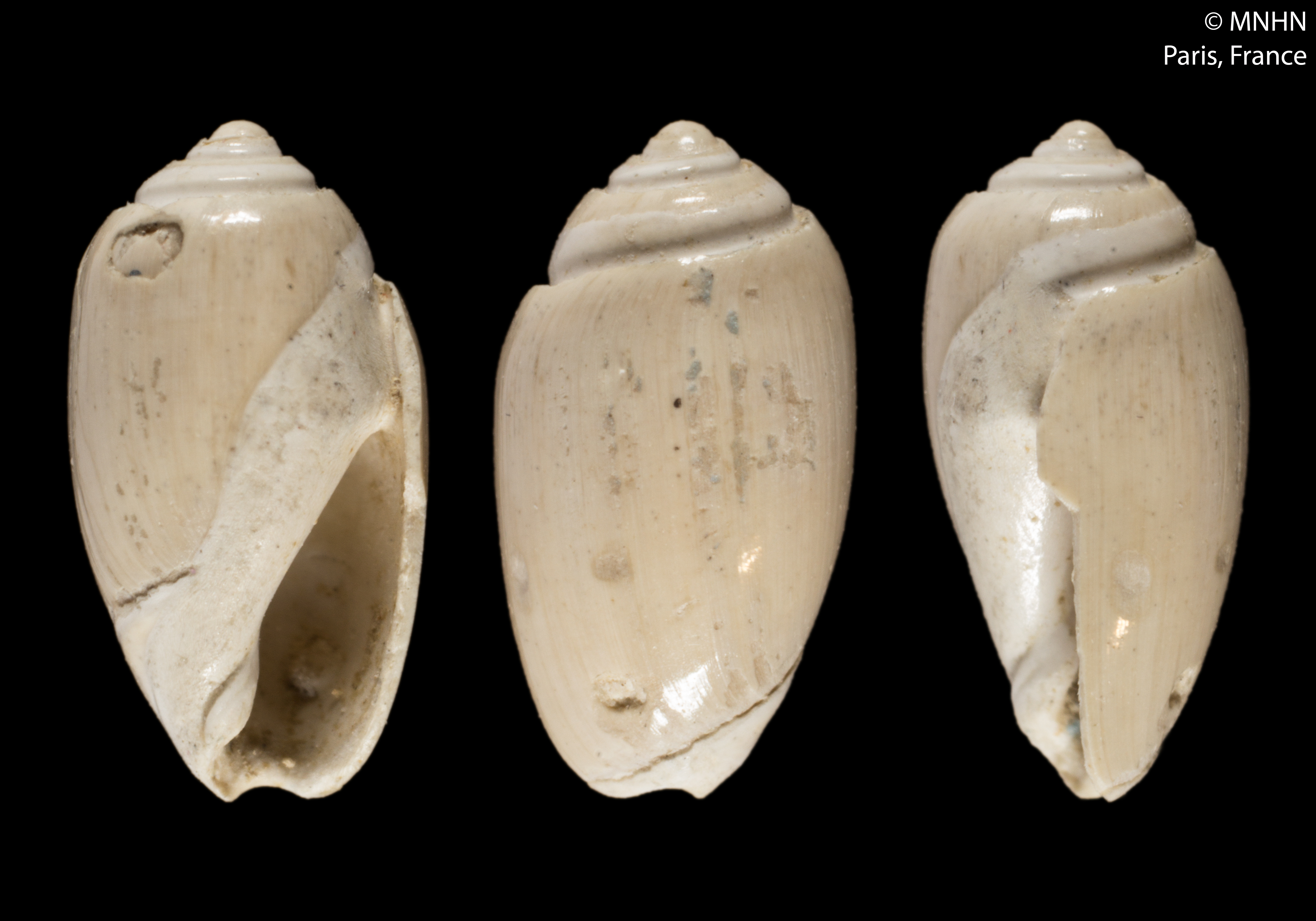
- Shell of Olivella klappenbachi (holotype at MNHN, Paris)

Scientific classification
- Kingdom: Animalia
- Phylum: Mollusca
- Class: Gastropoda
- Subclass: Caenogastropoda
- Order: Neogastropoda
- Family: Olividae
- Genus: Olivella
- Species: O. klappenbachi

Binomial name
- Olivella klappenbachi Absalão & Pimenta, 2003

Synonyms
- Olivella (Olivina) klappenbachi Absalão & Pimenta, 2003 (basionym)

= Olivella klappenbachi =

Species of gastropod

Olivella klappenbachi is a species of small sea snail, marine gastropod mollusk in the subfamily Olivellinae, in the family Olividae, the olives. Species in the genus Olivella are commonly called dwarf olives.

== Description ==
The length of the shell attains 5.8 mm.

== Distribution ==
This marine species occurs off Southeast Brazil.
