= Olivella lindae =

Scientific classification
- Kingdom: Animalia
- Phylum: Mollusca
- Class: Gastropoda
- Subclass: Caenogastropoda
- Order: Neogastropoda
- Family: Olividae
- Genus: Olivella
- Species: O. lindae

Binomial name
- Olivella lindae Petuch, 1992

Species of gastropod

Olivella lindae is a species of small sea snail, marine gastropod mollusk in the subfamily Olivellinae, in the family Olividae, the olives. Species in the genus Olivella are commonly called dwarf olives.

This is a nomen nudum.

== Description ==
The shell grows to a length of 10 mm.

== Distribution ==
This species occurs in the Caribbean Sea off Venezuela.
