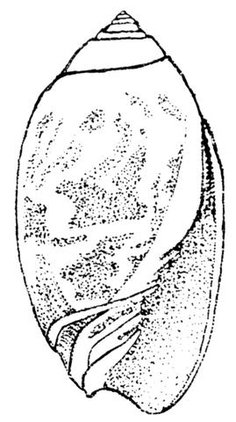
- Holotype of Olivella barbenthos

Scientific classification
- Kingdom: Animalia
- Phylum: Mollusca
- Class: Gastropoda
- Subclass: Caenogastropoda
- Order: Neogastropoda
- Family: Olividae
- Genus: Olivella
- Species: O. barbenthos

Binomial name
- Olivella barbenthos Recourt, 1989

= Olivella barbenthos =

Species of gastropod

Olivella barbenthos is a species of small sea snail, marine gastropod mollusk in the subfamily Olivellinae, in the family Olividae, the olives. Species in the genus Olivella are commonly called dwarf olives.

== Description ==
Original description: "Shell is medium-sized for the genus (6.2 – 8.6 mm.) with 6–7 whorls, stout, oval and short spired. Suture narrow and deep. A part of the ventral side of the shell is covered with thickened callus. Protoconch small. The columella has two series of plicae, an upper and a lower one. The upper series consists of 3–5 plicae, the lower of 4–5. The ground colour is white. The shell has an interrupted band around the middle of the body whorl, which is sometimes vague on lighter coloured specimens. The body whorl is covered with light to dark brown longitudinal waves. Darker specimens have a purple band around the body whorl just below the suture. This band is white on lighter coloured shells, which are more frequent. A light to dark brown fasciolar band is present.

Holotype: Measurements: height 7.2 mm. and width 3.7 mm. Preserved in the type collection of the Zoologisch Museum, Amsterdam (ZMA Moll. 3.088. 037)."

== Etymology ==
Derivatio nominis: The name barbenthos is a contraction of two words - a geographic name, Barbados, and the Ancient Greek word for depth, Benthos. It was also the name of the vessel with which the type material was originally dredged.

== Distribution ==
Tropical Northwestern Atlantic province. Eastern Caribbean ecoregion.

The species is known from the type locality, i.e. the West coast of Barbados, Lesser Antilles at depths ranging from 140 to 210 metres, via dredging. Also known from Martinique, and from Honduras and Panama in the Western Caribbean Sea.
