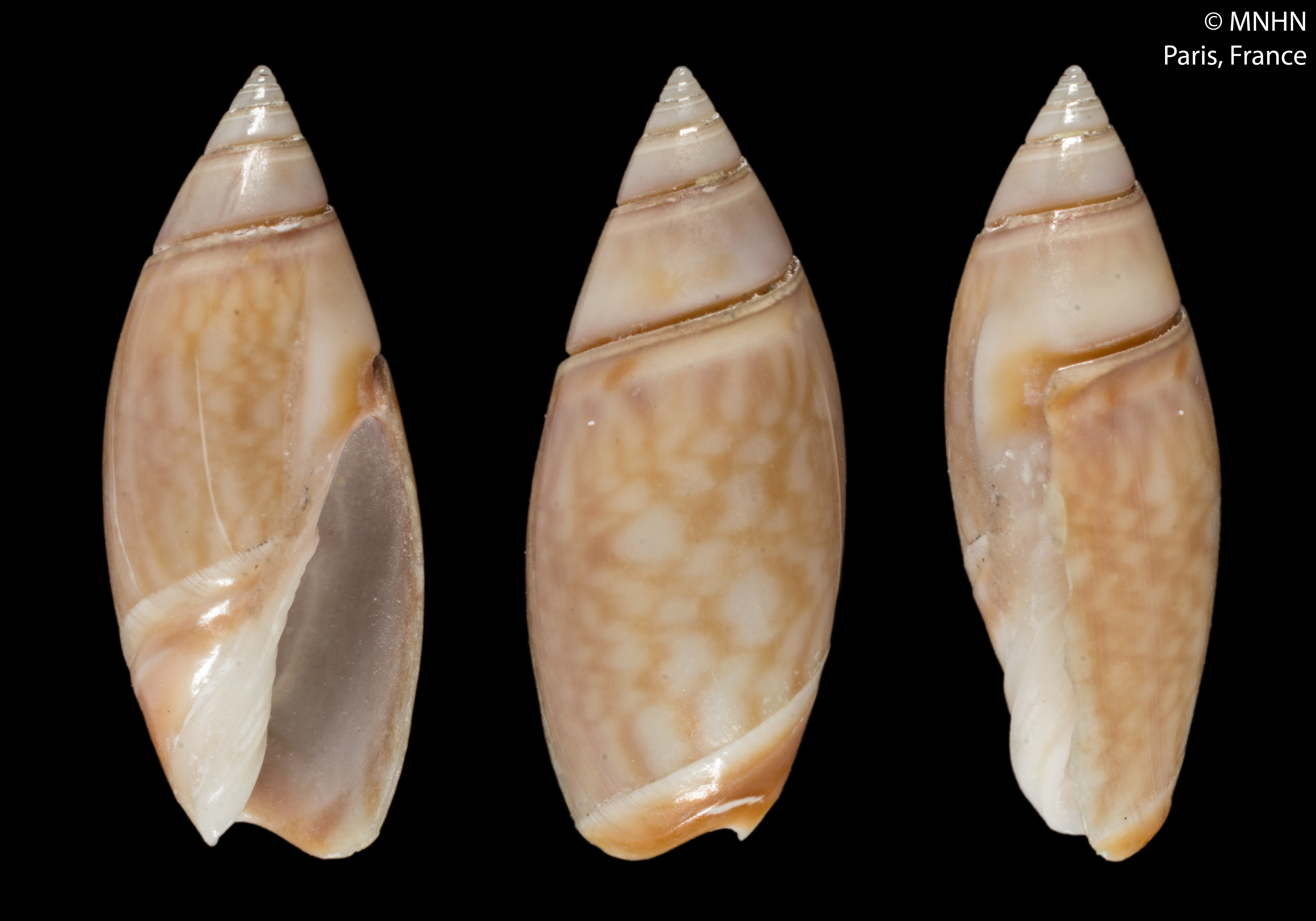
- Shell of Olivella anazora (syntype at MNHN, Paris)

Scientific classification
- Kingdom: Animalia
- Phylum: Mollusca
- Class: Gastropoda
- Subclass: Caenogastropoda
- Order: Neogastropoda
- Family: Olividae
- Genus: Olivella
- Species: O. anazora

Binomial name
- Olivella anazora (Duclos, 1835)

Synonyms
- Oliva anazora Duclos, 1835 (original combination); Olivella (Dactylidella) anazora Duclos, 1835

= Olivella anazora =

Species of gastropod

Olivella anazora is a species of small sea snail, marine gastropod mollusk in the subfamily Olivellinae, in the family Olividae, the olives. Species in the genus Olivella are commonly called dwarf olives.

== Description ==
The length of the shell varies between 9 mm and 20 mm.

== Distribution ==
This species occurs in the Pacific Ocean from the Gulf of California to Peru; also off the Galapagos.
