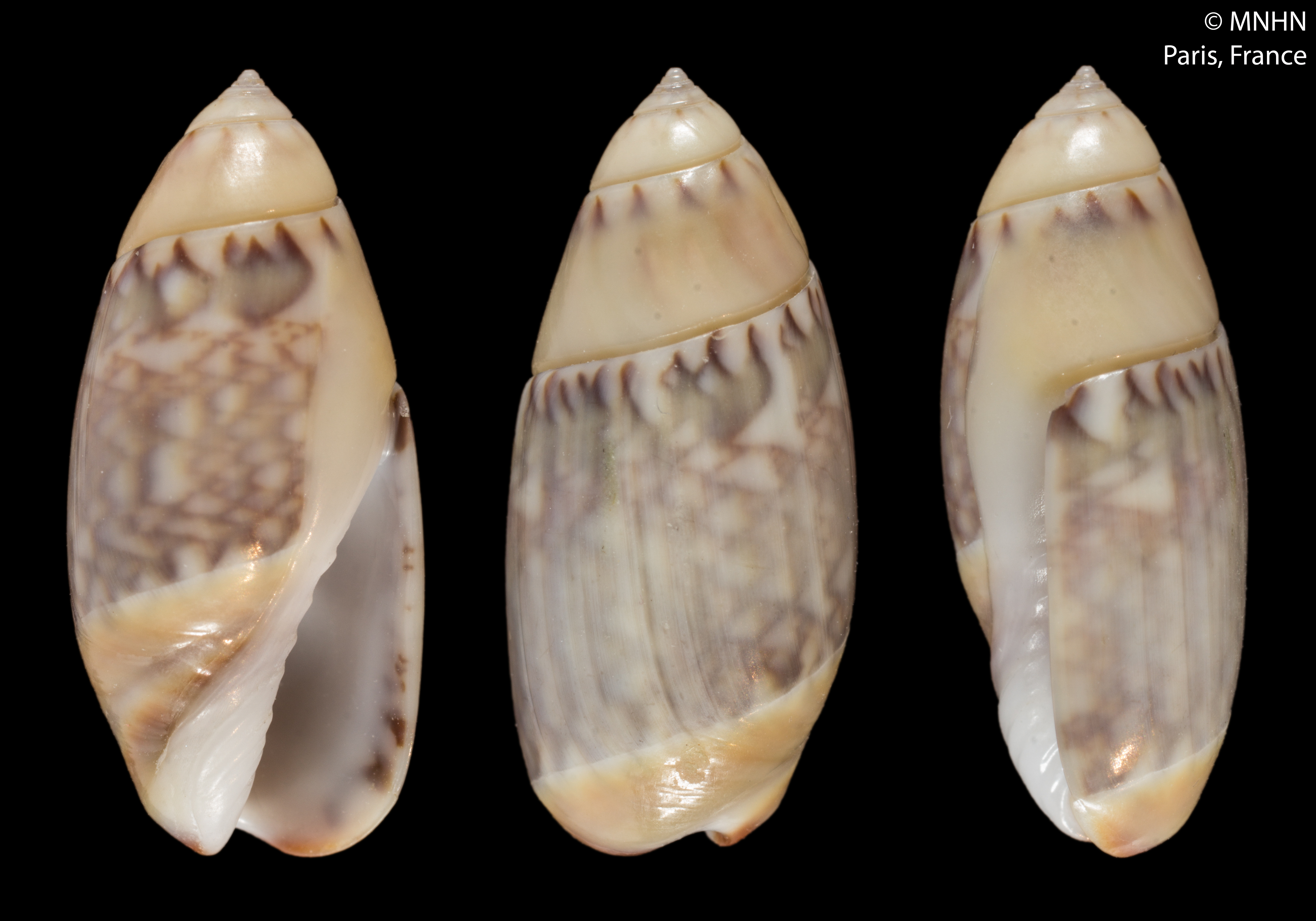
- Shell of Olivella tergina (syntype at MNHN, Paris)

Scientific classification
- Kingdom: Animalia
- Phylum: Mollusca
- Class: Gastropoda
- Subclass: Caenogastropoda
- Order: Neogastropoda
- Family: Olividae
- Genus: Olivella
- Species: O. tergina

Binomial name
- Olivella tergina (Duclos, 1835)

= Olivella tergina =

Species of gastropod

Olivella tergina is a species of small sea snail, marine gastropod mollusk in the subfamily Olivellinae, in the family Olividae, the olives. Species in the genus Olivella are commonly called dwarf olives.

== Description ==
The shell of Olivella tergina is typically small, reaching about 11-16 mm in length. It is smooth, cylindrical, and often glossy, with a narrow aperture. The coloration of O. tergina shells varies but often includes a combination of tan, brown, and occasionally purplish hues, with potential patterns or streaks.

The body of the snail itself is soft and extends into a long foot, which it uses to move and bury itself within the sand. Olivella species have a siphon, which they extend to the surface while buried, allowing them to respire and detect prey.

== Distribution ==
This marine species occurs off Mexico to Panama and Peru - West coast of The Americas.
