= Olivella thompsoni =

Scientific classification
- Kingdom: Animalia
- Phylum: Mollusca
- Class: Gastropoda
- Subclass: Caenogastropoda
- Order: Neogastropoda
- Family: Olividae
- Genus: Olivella
- Species: O. thompsoni

Binomial name
- Olivella thompsoni Olsson, 1956

Species of gastropod

Olivella thompsoni is a species of small sea snail, marine gastropod mollusk in the subfamily Olivellinae, in the family Olividae, the olives. Species in the genus Olivella are commonly called dwarf olives.

== Description ==
Original description: "Shell small, solid with an elevated spire of about 6 whorls, the first 2 forming a relatively large, blunt nucleus. The body-whorl is fairly large, convex. Sutures are narrowly grooved with a slightly appressed margin in front. Parietal callus narrow and extends to the end of aperture. The pillar structure forms a small, double fold at the end of the pillar, often much heavier within; opposite to it at the lower end of the outer lip, there is sometimes a small liration. Inner wall of the pillar shows no sign of corrosion, its form being normally concave. Surface smooth and polished, white or yellow, sometimes with longitudinal streaks or flammules of brown. Lip simple and unthickened. Length 11 mm., diameter 5 mm."

== Distribution ==
Locus typicus: "Edge of Pourtalès Platform southward of Sombrero Light
off Marathon, Florida Keys, Florida, USA."
