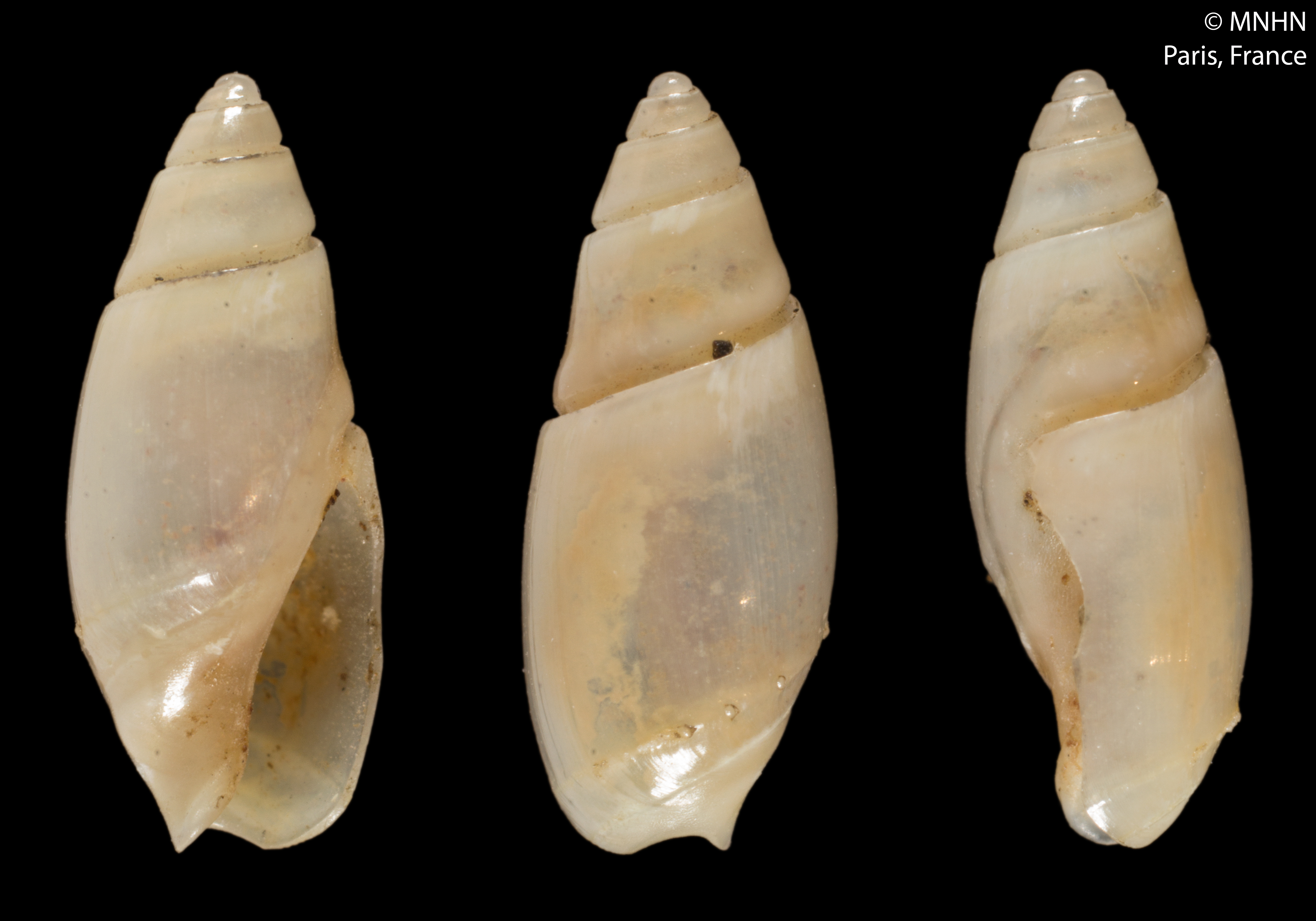
- Shell of Olivella lepta (syntype at MNHN. Paris)

Scientific classification
- Kingdom: Animalia
- Phylum: Mollusca
- Class: Gastropoda
- Subclass: Caenogastropoda
- Order: Neogastropoda
- Family: Olividae
- Genus: Olivella
- Species: O. lepta

Binomial name
- Olivella lepta (Duclos, 1835)

Synonyms
- Oliva lepta Duclos, 1835 (original combination)

= Olivella lepta =

Species of gastropod

Olivella lepta is a species of small sea snail, marine gastropod mollusk in the subfamily Olivellinae, in the family Olividae, the olives. Species in the genus Olivella are commonly called dwarf olives.

== Description ==
The length of the shell varies between 8 and 12 mm (0.3 and 0.5 in).

== Distribution ==
This marine species occurs off Southern Japan and off Taiwan.
