= Olivella poppei =

Scientific classification
- Kingdom: Animalia
- Phylum: Mollusca
- Class: Gastropoda
- Subclass: Caenogastropoda
- Order: Neogastropoda
- Family: Olividae
- Genus: Olivella
- Species: O. poppei

Binomial name
- Olivella poppei Bozzetti, 1998

Species of gastropod

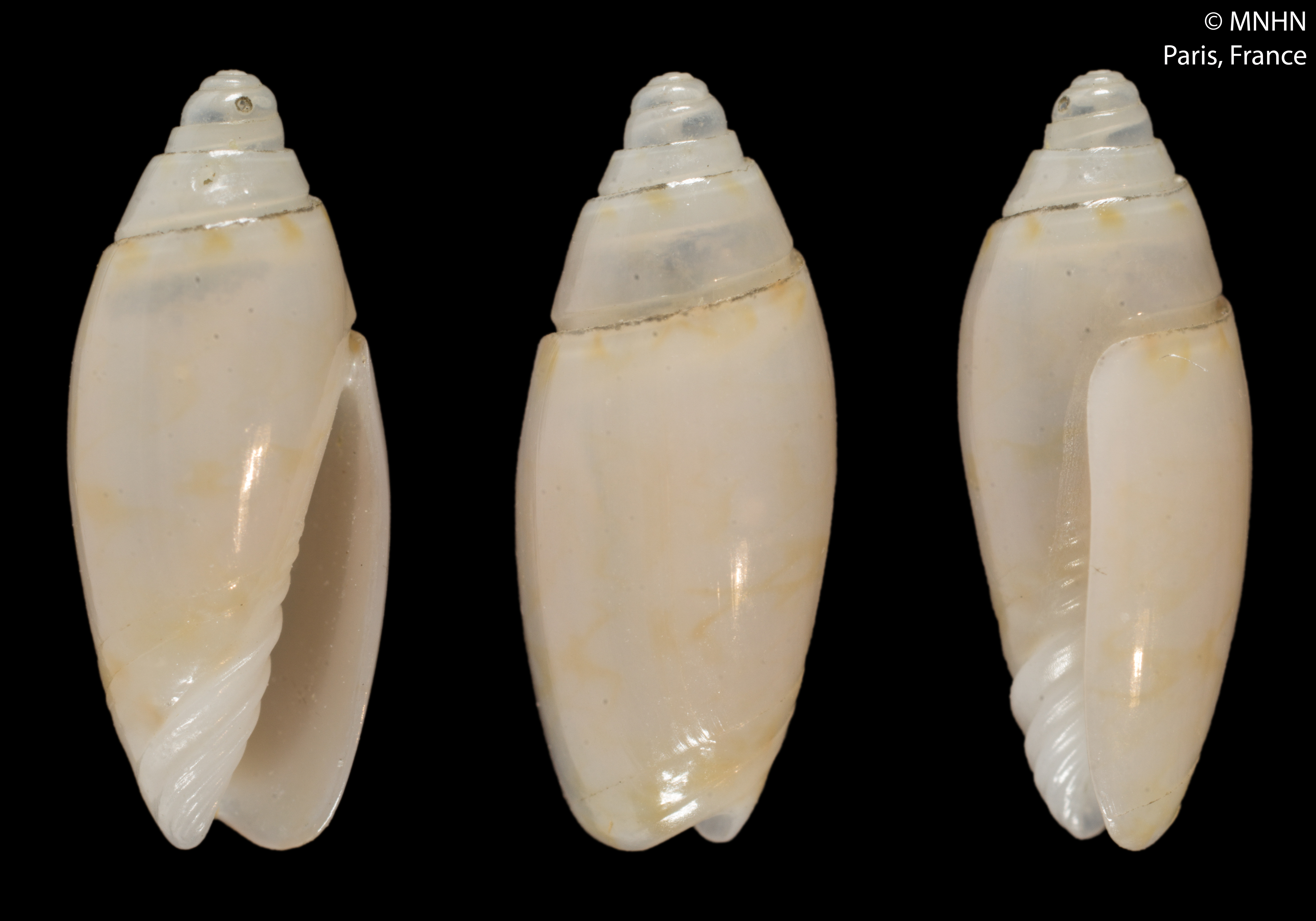

Olivella poppei is a species of small sea snail, marine gastropod mollusk in the subfamily Olivellinae, in the family Olividae, the olives. Species in the genus Olivella are commonly called dwarf olives.

== Description ==
The length of the shell attains 10.2 mm. The specimen type of this sea snail is holotype.

== Distribution ==
This marine species occurs off Japan.
