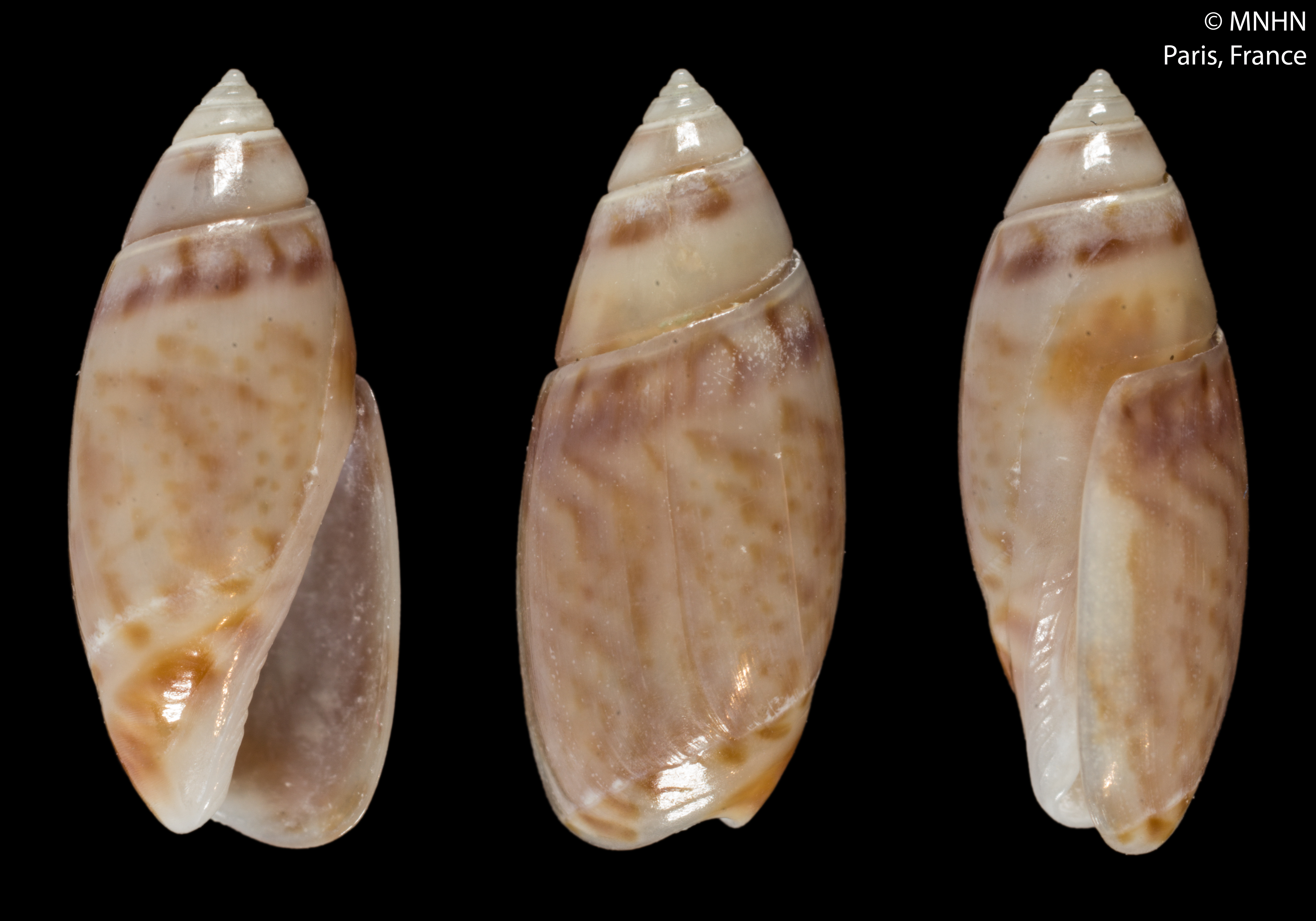

Scientific classification
- Kingdom: Animalia
- Phylum: Mollusca
- Class: Gastropoda
- Subclass: Caenogastropoda
- Order: Neogastropoda
- Family: Olividae
- Genus: Olivella
- Species: O. mandarina

Binomial name
- Olivella mandarina (Duclos, 1835)

Synonyms
- Oliva mandarina Duclos, 1835 (original combination); Oliva selasia Duclos, 1835; Oliva tunquina Duclos, 1835; Olivella fortunei var. japonica Pilsbry, 1895 (junior synonym); Olivella japonica Pilsbry, 1895

= Olivella mandarina =

Species of gastropod

Olivella mandarina is a species of small sea snail, marine gastropod mollusk in the subfamily Olivellinae, in the family Olividae, the olives. Species in the genus Olivella are commonly called dwarf olives.

== Description ==
The length of the shell attains 12 mm.

== Distribution ==
This marine species occurs off Acapulco, Mexico.
