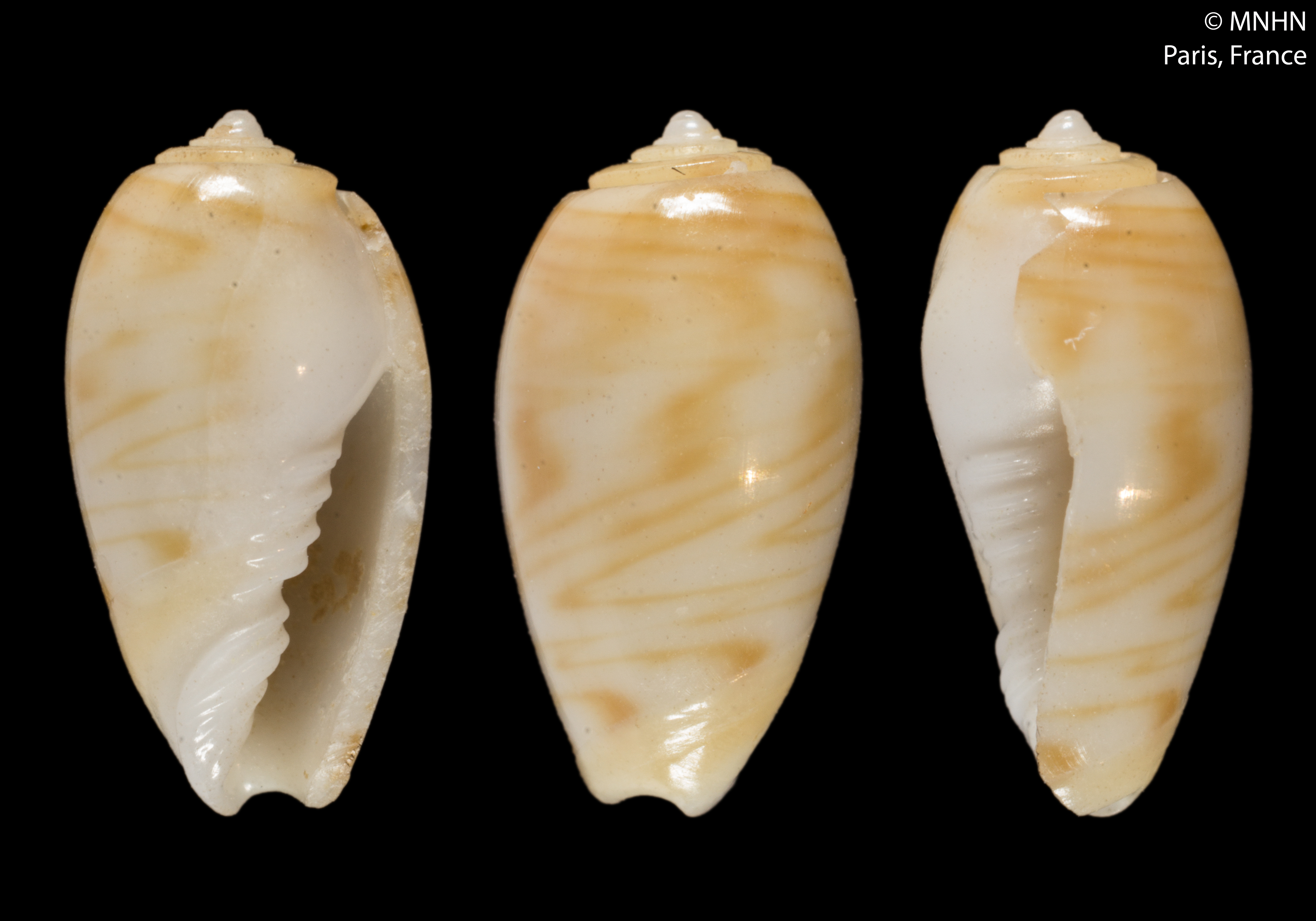
- Shell of Olivella marginelloides (holotype at MNHN. Paris)

Scientific classification
- Kingdom: Animalia
- Phylum: Mollusca
- Class: Gastropoda
- Subclass: Caenogastropoda
- Order: Neogastropoda
- Family: Olividae
- Genus: Olivella
- Species: O. marginelloides

Binomial name
- Olivella marginelloides Paulmier, 2007

Synonyms
- Olivella (Parolivella) marginelloides Paulmier, 2007

= Olivella marginelloides =

Species of gastropod

Olivella marginelloides is a species of small sea snail, marine gastropod mollusk in the subfamily Olivellinae, in the family Olividae, the olives. Species in the genus Olivella are commonly known as dwarf olives.

== Description ==
The length of the shell attains 8 mm.

== Distribution ==
This marine species occurs off Martinique.
