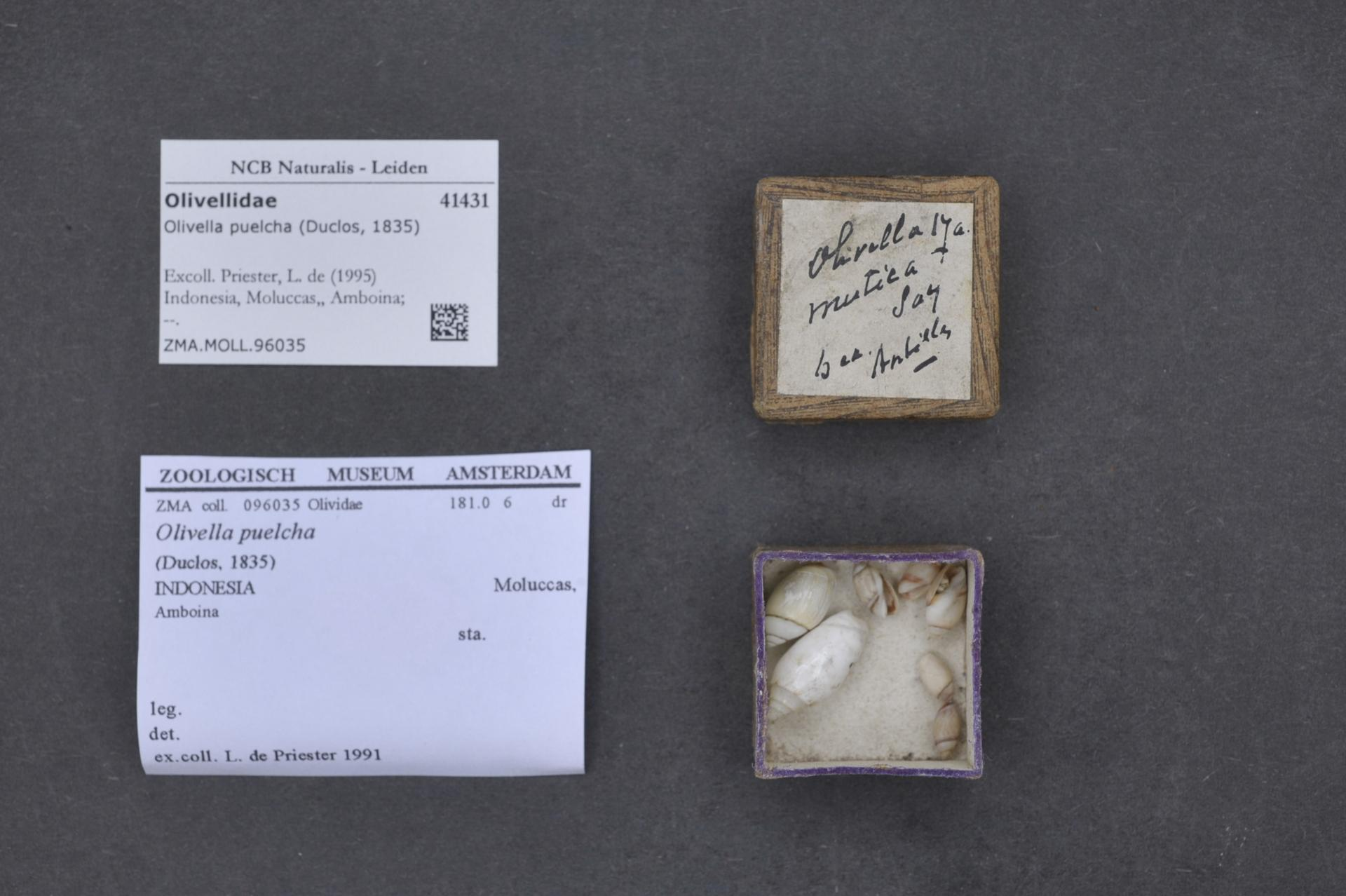

Scientific classification
- Kingdom: Animalia
- Phylum: Mollusca
- Class: Gastropoda
- Subclass: Caenogastropoda
- Order: Neogastropoda
- Family: Olividae
- Genus: Olivella
- Species: O. puelcha

Binomial name
- Olivella puelcha (Duclos, 1835)

Synonyms
- Oliva puelcha Duclos, 1835 (original combination); Oliva tehuelchana d'Orbigny, 1839; Olivancillaria auricularia plata Ihering, 1908; Olivella plata (Ihering, 1908)

= Olivella puelcha =

Species of gastropod

Olivella puelcha is a species of small sea snail, marine gastropod mollusk in the subfamily Olivellinae, in the family Olividae, the olives. Species in the genus Olivella are commonly called dwarf olives.

== Distribution ==
This species occurs in the Atlantic Ocean from Brazil to Argentina.
