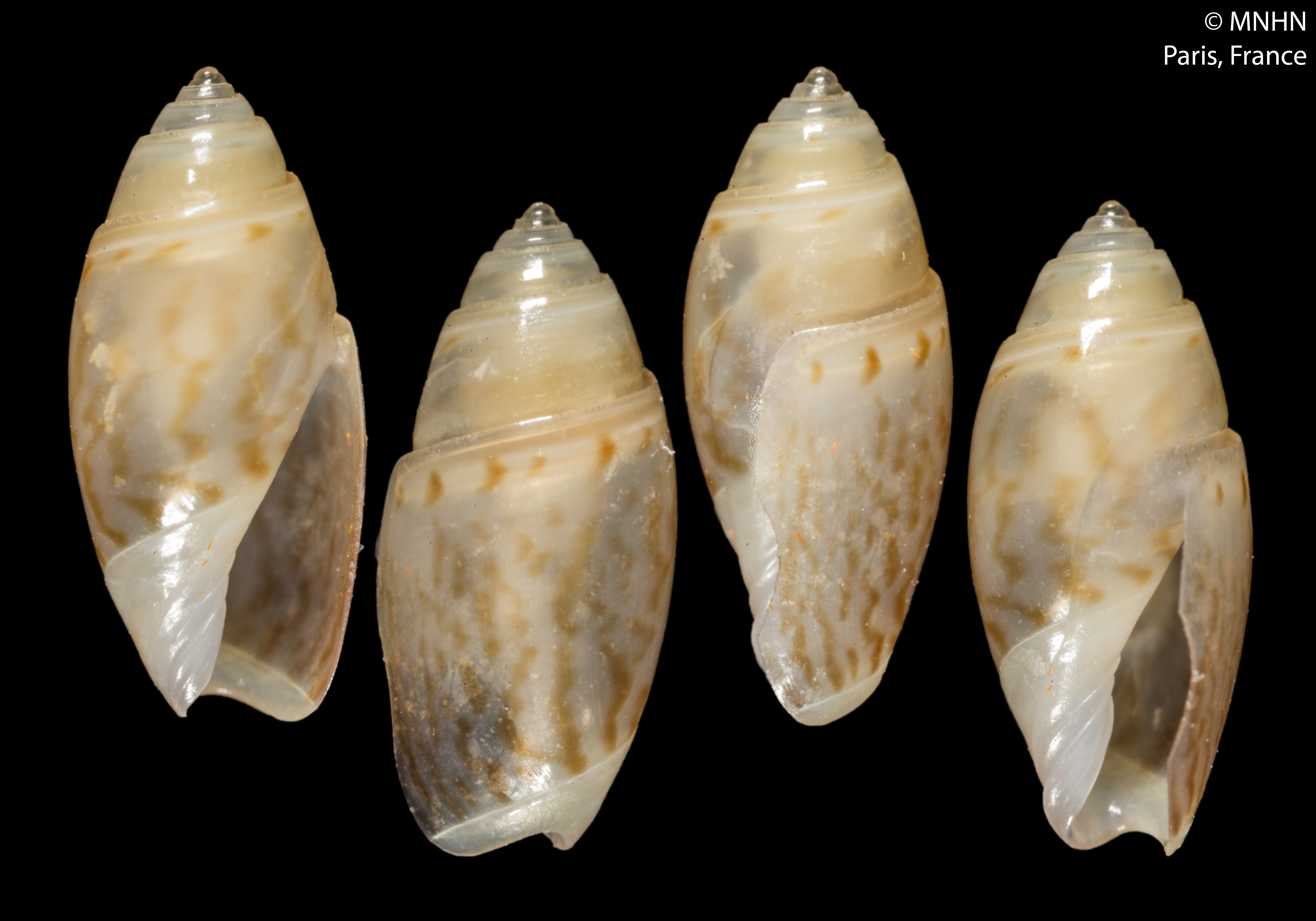
- Shell of Olivella olssoni (specimen at MNHN, Paris)

Scientific classification
- Kingdom: Animalia
- Phylum: Mollusca
- Class: Gastropoda
- Subclass: Caenogastropoda
- Order: Neogastropoda
- Family: Olividae
- Genus: Olivella
- Species: O. olssoni

Binomial name
- Olivella olssoni Altena, 1971

= Olivella olssoni =

Species of gastropod

Olivella olssoni is a species of small sea snail, marine gastropod mollusk in the subfamily Olivellinae, in the family Olividae, the olives. Species in the genus Olivella are commonly called dwarf olives.

== Distribution ==
This marine species occurs off Guadeloupe.
