= Olivella santacruzence =

Scientific classification
- Kingdom: Animalia
- Phylum: Mollusca
- Class: Gastropoda
- Subclass: Caenogastropoda
- Order: Neogastropoda
- Family: Olividae
- Genus: Olivella
- Species: O. santacruzence

Binomial name
- Olivella santacruzence Castellanos & Fernández, 1965

Synonyms
- Olivella santacruzense Castellanos, 1965 (misspelling)

Species of gastropod

Olivella santacruzence is a species of small sea snail, marine gastropod mollusk in the subfamily Olivellinae, in the family Olividae, the olives. Species in the genus Olivella are commonly called dwarf olives.

== Description ==
The shell is small, reaching up to 9 mm, and subquadrangular in shape, with 4 to 4.5 smooth whorls. The protoconch has about two whorls, with no visible transition to the teleoconch. The shell is white, rarely with faint yellow spots. The spire is low, with a very wide, channeled suture, and the parietal callus is smooth and weakly developed. The columella bears six oblique plaits (nine in the holotype, according to the original description). The fasciolar band is wide and distinctly coloured, with a well-defined posterior groove. The soft parts of this species remain unknown, as it is known only from beach-collected shells.

== Distribution ==
This species is known only from its type locality, Punta Medanosa, in Santa Cruz Province, Argentina.
