= Olivella perplexa =

Scientific classification
- Kingdom: Animalia
- Phylum: Mollusca
- Class: Gastropoda
- Subclass: Caenogastropoda
- Order: Neogastropoda
- Family: Olividae
- Genus: Olivella
- Species: O. perplexa

Binomial name
- Olivella perplexa Olsson, 1956

Species of gastropod

Olivella perplexa is a species of small sea snail, marine gastropod mollusk in the subfamily Olivellinae, in the family Olividae, the olives. Species in the genus Olivella are commonly called dwarf olives.

== Description ==
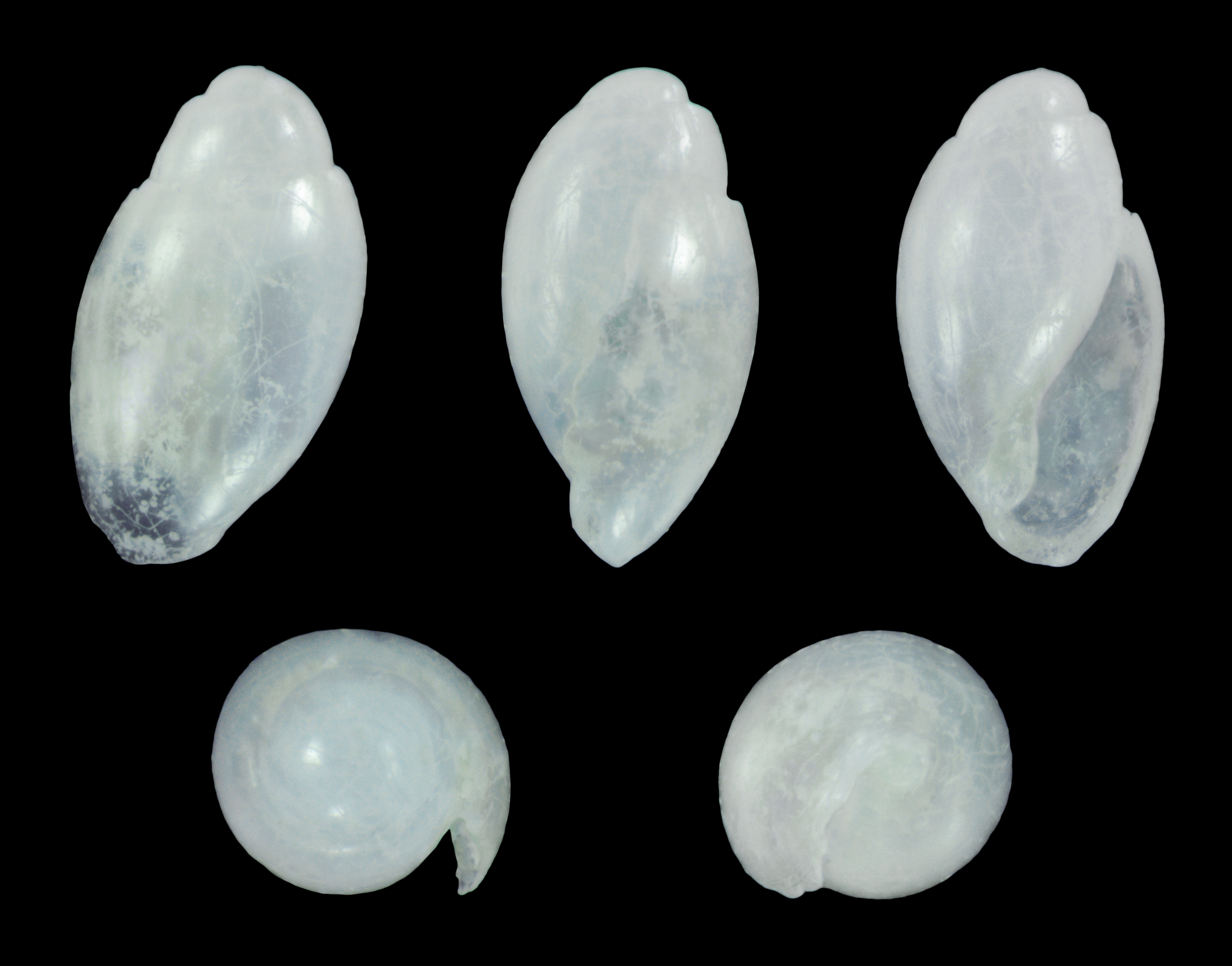
Juvenile

Original description: "The shell is small (maximum length about 5 mm.), relatively solid and porcellaneous white, glossy, usually with an elevated stubby spire of about 5 whorls and about half the total length. The nuclear whorls are small, convex and partly immersed so as to appear to lie below the general level of the succeeding turn. The sutures are deeply channelled, widely overlapped by the sharp and often frayed margin of the whorl in front. Parietal callus is thick, particularly so near the end of the aperture from which it extends downward along the surface of the parietal wall as in thickened ribbon to the end of the columella which it partly encircles. The pillar structure is a simple fold at the end of the columella. Fasciole small and simple. The outer lip has a straight, thin edge, its posterior junction with the body-whorl enclosing a short canal.
Length 3.8 mm., diameter 1.8 mm."

== Distribution ==
Locus typicus: "Marathon, Florida Keys, Florida, USA."
