= Olivella miriadina =

Scientific classification
- Kingdom: Animalia
- Phylum: Mollusca
- Class: Gastropoda
- Subclass: Caenogastropoda
- Order: Neogastropoda
- Family: Olividae
- Genus: Olivella
- Species: O. miriadina

Binomial name
- Olivella miriadina (Duclos, 1835)

Species of gastropod

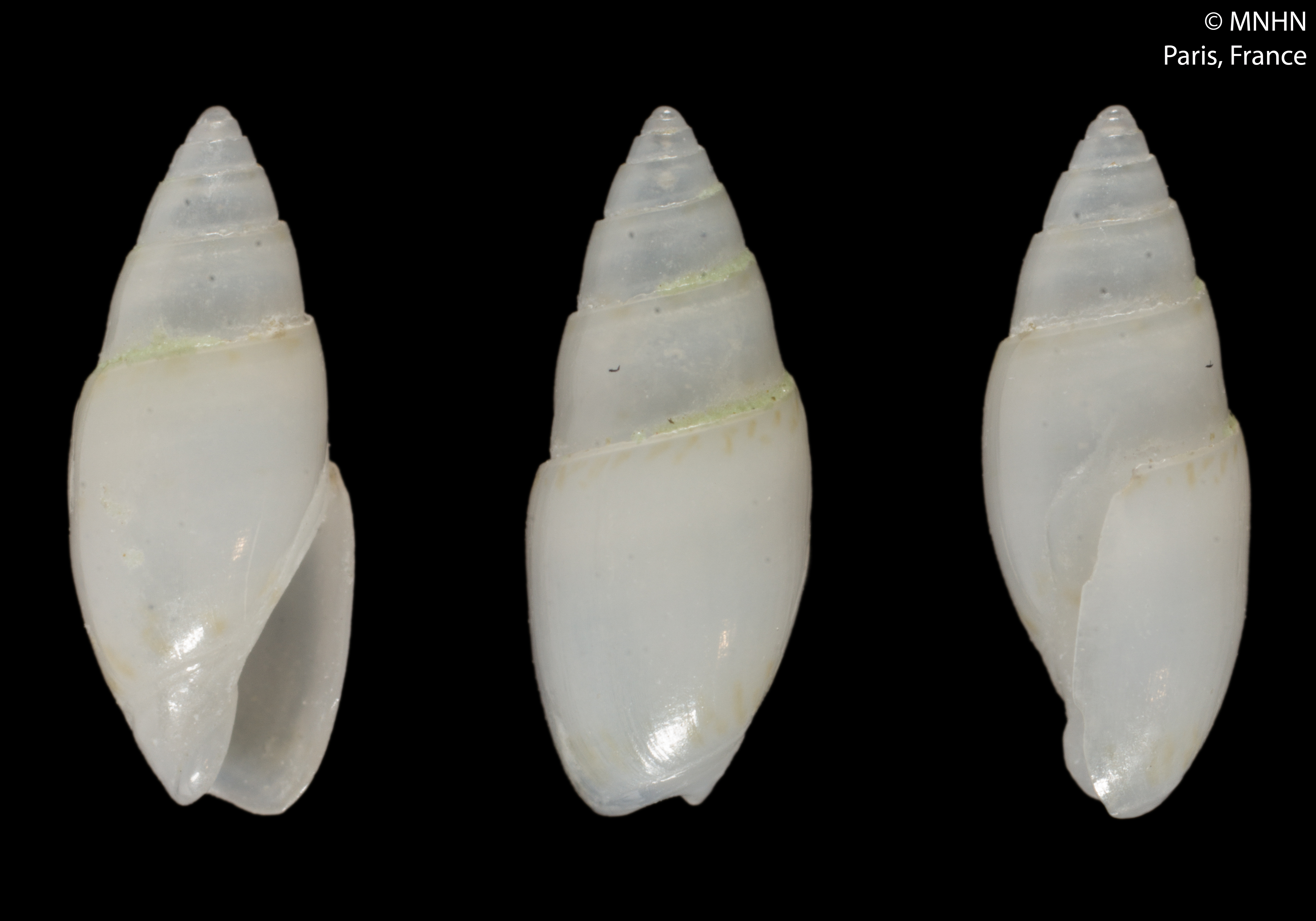

Olivella miriadina is a species of small sea snail, marine gastropod mollusk in the subfamily Olivellinae, in the family Olividae, the olives. Species in the genus Olivella are commonly called dwarf olives.

== Description ==
The length of the shell attains 6 mm.

== Distribution ==
This marine species occurs off Colombia; Venezuela and the Lesser Antilles.
