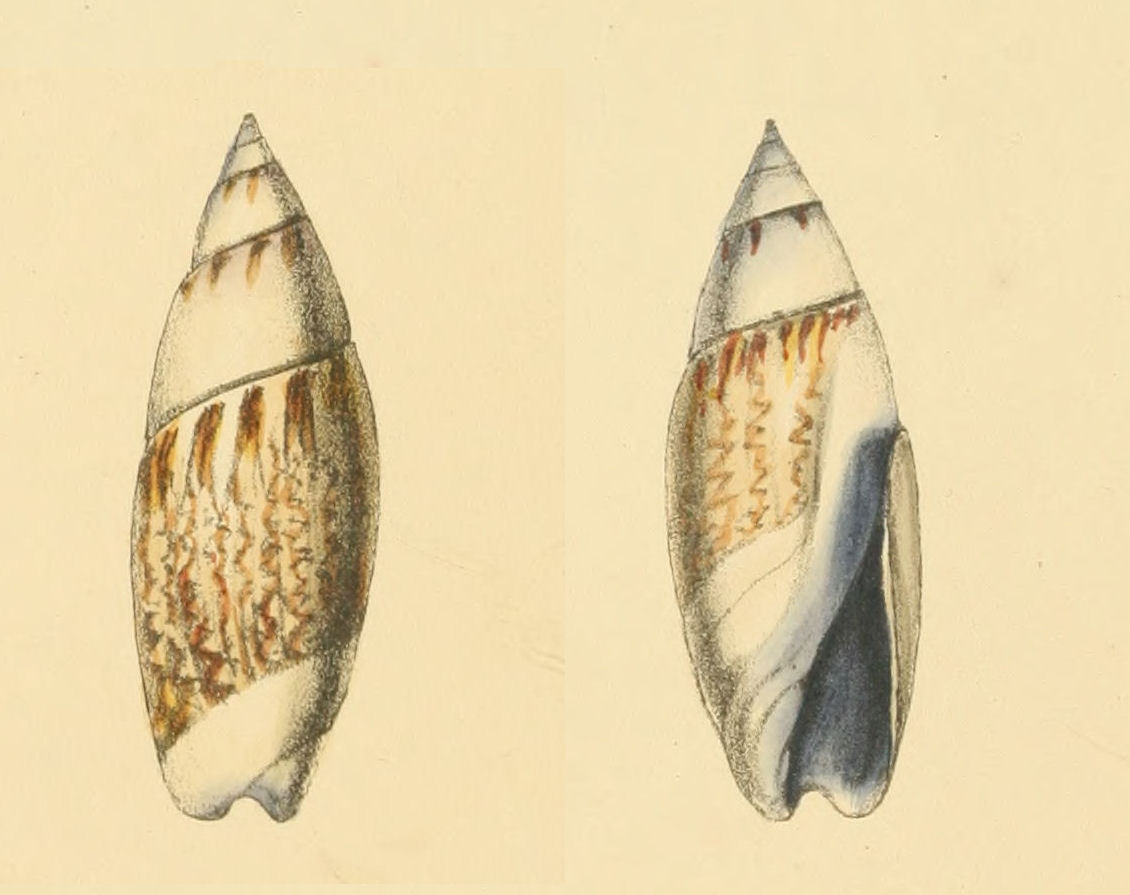

Scientific classification
- Kingdom: Animalia
- Phylum: Mollusca
- Class: Gastropoda
- Subclass: Caenogastropoda
- Order: Neogastropoda
- Family: Olividae
- Genus: Olivella
- Species: O. dama

Binomial name
- Olivella dama (Mawe in Wood, 1828)

= Olivella dama =

Species of gastropod

Olivella dama is a species of small sea snail, marine gastropod mollusk in the subfamily Olivellinae, in the family Olividae, the olives. Species in the genus Olivella are commonly called dwarf olives.

== Description ==
The shell is whiteish, with a very acute spire, nearly as long as the aperture. The middle of the body whorl is marked by angulated brown lines: the suture has spots and fascicles of longitudinal stripes: the basal belt is very broad: the aperture purple.

== Distribution ==
Gulf of California area, West coast of North America.
