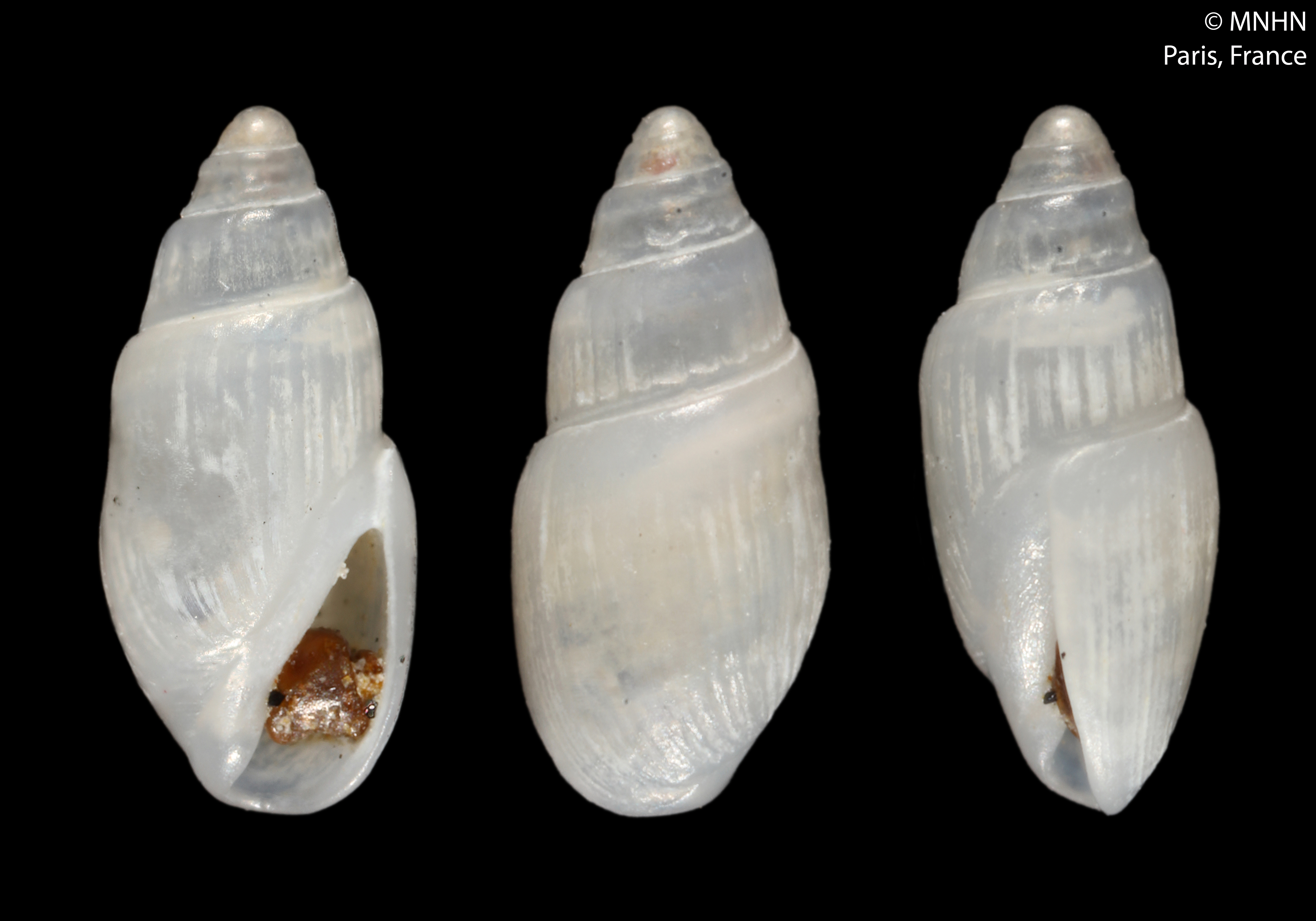
- Shell of Olivella costulata (holotype at MNHN, Paris)

Scientific classification
- Kingdom: Animalia
- Phylum: Mollusca
- Class: Gastropoda
- Subclass: Caenogastropoda
- Order: Neogastropoda
- Family: Olividae
- Genus: Olivella
- Species: O. costulata

Binomial name
- Olivella costulata Paulmier, 2007

= Olivella costulata =

Species of gastropod

Olivella costulata is a species of small sea snail, marine gastropod mollusk in the subfamily Olivellinae, in the family Olividae, the olives. Species in the genus Olivella are commonly called dwarf olives.

== Description ==
Members of the order Neogastropoda are mostly gonochoric and broadcast spawners. Their embryos develop into planktonic trochophore larvae and later into juvenile veligers before becoming fully grown adults.

The length of the shell attains 2.68 mm.

== Distribution ==
This marine species occurs off Martinique.
