= Olivella tunquina =

Scientific classification
- Kingdom: Animalia
- Phylum: Mollusca
- Class: Gastropoda
- Subclass: Caenogastropoda
- Order: Neogastropoda
- Family: Olividae
- Genus: Olivella
- Species: O. tunquina

Binomial name
- Olivella tunquina (Duclos, 1835)

Species of gastropod

Olivella tunquina is a species of small sea snail, a marine gastropod mollusk in the subfamily Olivellinae, in the family Olividae, the olives. Species in the genus Olivella are commonly called dwarf olives.
