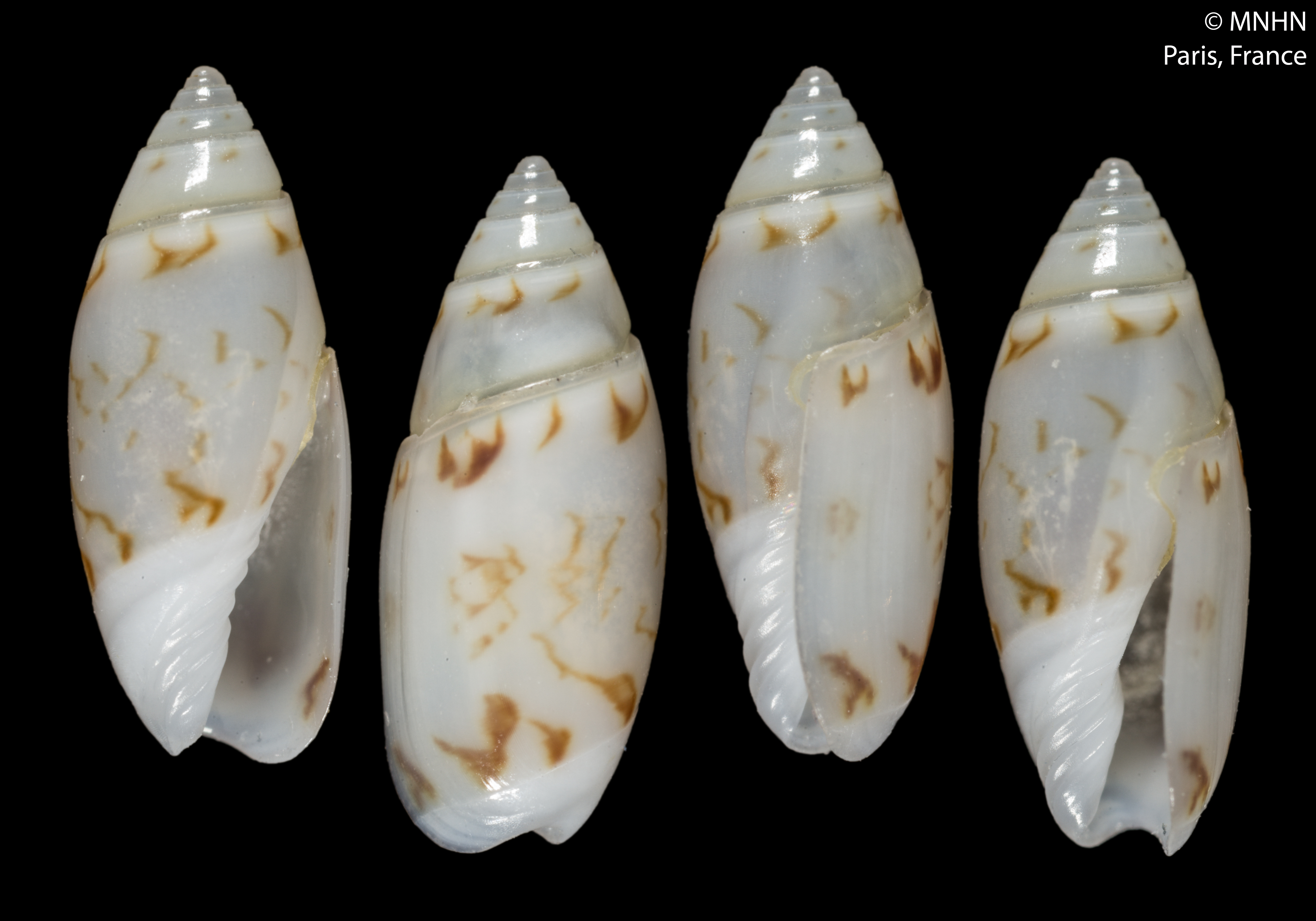
- Shell of Olivella exilis (specimen at MNHN, Paris)

Scientific classification
- Kingdom: Animalia
- Phylum: Mollusca
- Class: Gastropoda
- Subclass: Caenogastropoda
- Order: Neogastropoda
- Family: Olividae
- Genus: Olivella
- Species: O. exilis

Binomial name
- Olivella exilis (Marrat, 1871)

Synonyms
- Olivella (Lamprodoma) exilis (Marrat, 1871)

= Olivella exilis =

Species of gastropod

Olivella exilis is a species of small sea snail, marine gastropod mollusk in the subfamily Olivellinae, in the family Olividae, the olives. Species in the genus Olivella are commonly called dwarf olives.

The taxonomic status of this species is uncertain.

== Description ==
The length of this species attains 10 mm.

== Distribution ==
This marine species occurs off the Bahamas; the Greater Antilles Guadeloupe and off Southeastern Florida, USA.
