= Olivella fuscocincta =

Scientific classification
- Kingdom: Animalia
- Phylum: Mollusca
- Class: Gastropoda
- Subclass: Caenogastropoda
- Order: Neogastropoda
- Family: Olividae
- Genus: Olivella
- Species: O. fuscocincta

Binomial name
- Olivella fuscocincta (Dall, 1889)

Species of sea snail

Olivella fuscocincata is a species of dwarf olive sea snail, marine gastropod mollusk.

== Description ==
Original description: "Shell stout, subcylindrical, short-spired; form about that of Fig. 298 in Sowerby, Thes. Conch. Mon. Oliva, by Marrat; free from any spots, streaks, or zigzag markings whatever; body pale fawn-color, with a white revolving band about two fifths of the way from the suture to the anterior end of the shell; this band is always present, and in some specimens another fainter one is visible anterior to the former; the nucleus, the anterior edge of the suture, the posterior edge of the outer fasciole, and the callosities of the mouth, are translucent white; the callus on the spire and the anterior part of the outer fasciole are uniform dark brown; the interior fasciole or anterior callus is white with from two to five ridges, in the gap between this and the posterior callus are about five ridges, while the posterior callus is smooth.
Lon. of shell,10.0 of aperture, 8.0 max. lat. of shell, 5.0 mm."
