= Olivella rotunda =

Scientific classification
- Kingdom: Animalia
- Phylum: Mollusca
- Class: Gastropoda
- Subclass: Caenogastropoda
- Order: Neogastropoda
- Family: Olividae
- Genus: Olivella
- Species: O. rotunda

Binomial name
- Olivella rotunda Dall, 1889

Synonyms
- Olivella jaspidea var. rotunda Dall, 1889 (basionym)

Species of gastropod

Olivella rotunda is a species of small sea snail, marine gastropod mollusk in the subfamily Olivellinae, in the family Olividae, the olives. Species in the genus Olivella are commonly called dwarf olives.

== Description ==
Original description: "Among the specimens brought back by the Blake were a number belonging to what, for safety's sake, it is more prudent to call a variety of Olivella jaspidea, as it goes through much the same series of color varieties, and, excepting the absence of spots or dots, has much the same color markings. It differs from the typical form in having a much shorter spire, a stouter olive-seed-like form, and especially in the denticulation of the body callus, which, beginning anteriorly, has two strong and a number of small not very regular ridges, behind which is a marked depression, and then an even uniform series of about ten fine ridges, the posterior of which is on the same line as the most posterior edge of the outer fasciole; the callus, throat, and nucleus are white; the size is larger than that of any jaspidea I have been able to find, and the shape is that of O. fuscocincta on a giant scale. The colors are usually pale, the whorls transversely streaked with rather broad soft lines of pink or brown, which vary from straight to zigzag, or may be more or less broken; the glaze of the fasciole and spire tends to brownish. Lon. of two specimens, 22.6 and 25.0 mm.; of the aperture of the same, 16.6 and 17.0 mm.; max. diam., 10.2 and 10.5 mm. They are very thick and solid, but most of the specimens are smaller."

== Distribution ==
This species occurs in the Caribbean Sea, the Gulf of Mexico and off the Lesser Antilles and Puerto Rico.
