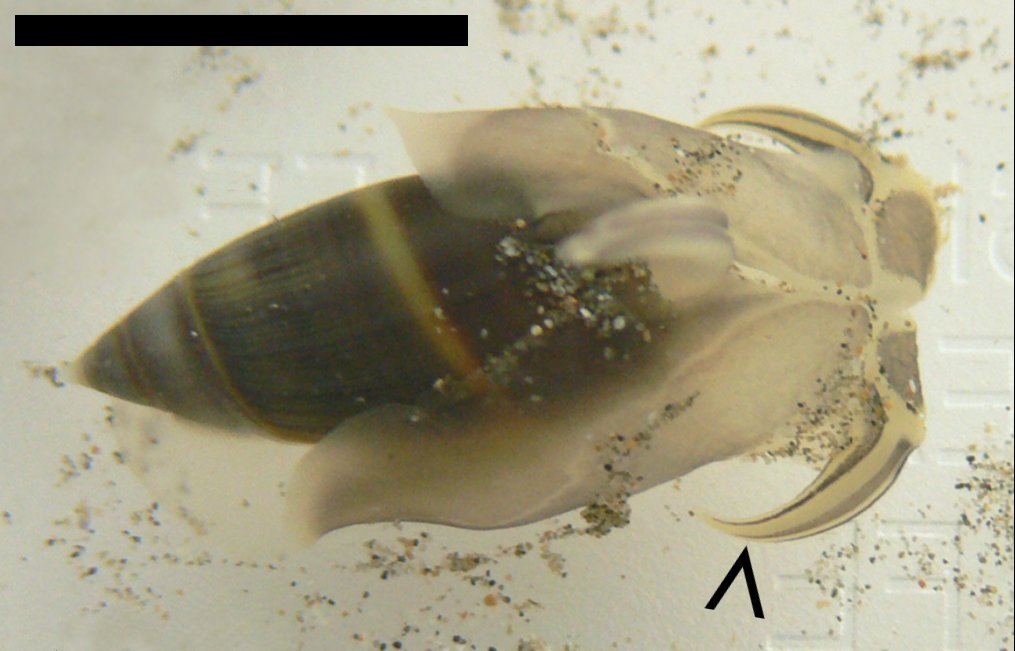
- Olivella semistriata, scale bar: 1 cm. Arrowhead highlights lateral propodial appendage. From

Scientific classification
- Kingdom: Animalia
- Phylum: Mollusca
- Class: Gastropoda
- Subclass: Caenogastropoda
- Order: Neogastropoda
- Family: Olividae
- Genus: Olivella
- Species: O. semistriata

Binomial name
- Olivella semistriata (Gray, 1839)

= Olivella semistriata =

Species of gastropod

Olivella semistriata is a species of small sea snail, a marine gastropod mollusk in the family Olividae, the olives. Species in the genus Olivella are commonly called dwarf olives With the very similar Olivella columellaris it forms the subgenus Pachyoliva. Both species are suspension feeders. They use unique appendages of the propodium (front part of the foot) to deploy mucus nets which capture suspended particles from the backwash on sandy beaches of the tropical eastern Pacific. Olivella semistriata is a swash-surfer; the snails use their expanded foot as an underwater sail to follow the tidal movement of the backwash zone in which they feed.

== Description ==
Shell of elongate oval shape, with relatively high and pointed spire and a large body whorl. The shell is smooth and shiny except for the upper (= posterior) half of the body whorl which carries dense longitudinal grooves, or striae (hence the name semistriata). These striae are a distinctive character that separates O. semistriata from all other Olivellinae; however, the striae do not begin to form before the animal exceeds 10 mm shell length. The suture is open. The aperture is elongate, and the inner lip (= the inner border of the aperture) is covered by thick parietal callus that may extend to the suture. Lirae (= ridges or plications) on the inner lip are lacking, but there is a conspicuous notch in the anterior third of the lip. The ground color is a dark brown or olive with a varying number (0 to 4) of lighter or darker, often fading bands. A rare color morph lacks the darkest pigments and shows golden-orange tones all over. The fasciolar band (= a distinctly structured portion of the shell around the siphonal notch) is brownish gray to white, and so is the apex in most individuals. A chitinous (= horny) operculum is present.

The living animal is brownish gray with characteristic dark marks on the propodium, the front part of the foot. It lacks cephalic tentacles and eyes. As in all Olivellinae and its family, the Olividae, the propodium is separated by a pronounced groove from the main foot, the metapodium. In O. semistriata (as well as in O. columellaris), the lateral tips of the propodium are greatly extended and function in suspension feeding. The propodium is further divided into a left and a right half. The mouth opening which can be everted on a proboscis, is located on the dorsal face of the foot between the left and right lobes of the propodium.

== Size variability and taxonomic problems ==
Some Olivella semistriata populations at sheltered locations with low wave energy consist entirely of dwarfish animals that hardly reach 10 mm shell length. On the other hand, the shell characters that allow an unambiguous identification of the species develop not before the snail grows above 10–12 mm shell length. This explains why small shells were described originally as a separate species, Oliva attenuata, by Reeve (1851), an author who evidently was familiar with the typical, larger O. semistriata. The error was noticed first by Weinkauff (1878) who concluded that O. attenuata was a dwarfish form of O. semistriata. The fact that neither O. semistriata nor its sister species O. columellaris develop their specific shell characters before they reach considerable size makes small specimens of the two species practically indistinguishable. This may have contributed to the very common confusion of the two species in museum collections and the scientific literature.

== Distribution ==
According to the older literature, Olivella semistriata is found along the American west coast from the Gulf of California to Northern Peru. The assumption of such a wide distribution range, however, seems partly due to the fact that small individuals cannot be distinguished from small specimens of the more southerly Olivella columellaris, and to the resulting misidentifications. To date (2013) it appears questionable whether O. semistriata actually occurs south of Panama.
