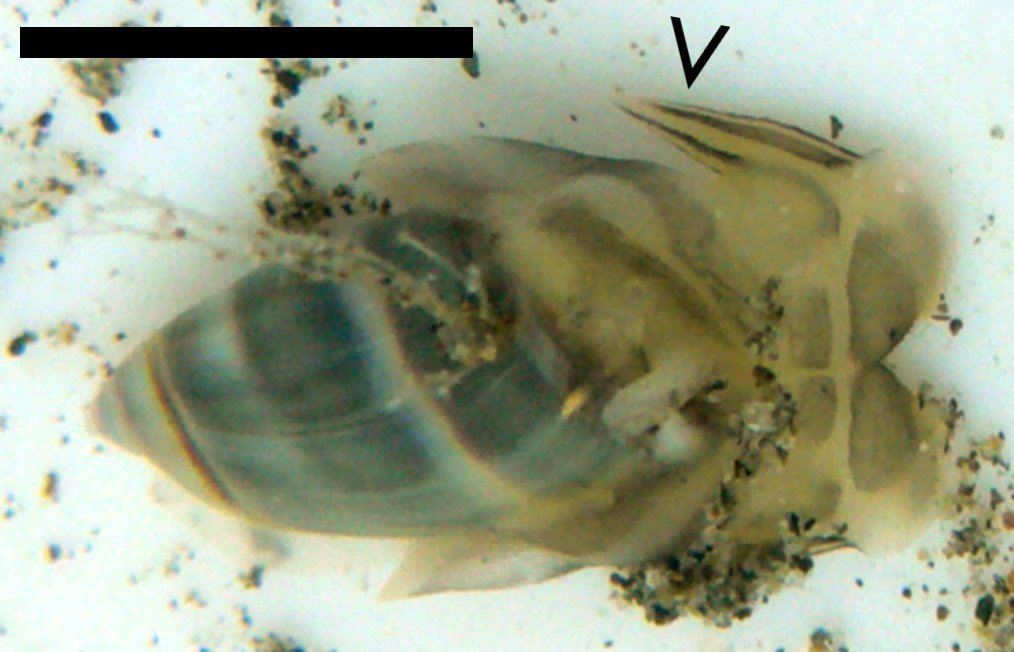
- Olivella columellaris crawling, scale bar: 1 cm. Arrowhead highlights lateral propodial appendage. From

Scientific classification
- Kingdom: Animalia
- Phylum: Mollusca
- Class: Gastropoda
- Subclass: Caenogastropoda
- Order: Neogastropoda
- Family: Olividae
- Genus: Olivella
- Species: O. columellaris

Binomial name
- Olivella columellaris (Sowerby I, 1825)

= Olivella columellaris =

Species of gastropod

Olivella columellaris is a species of small sea snail, marine gastropod mollusk in the subfamily Olivellinae, in the family Olividae, the olives. Species in the genus Olivella are commonly called dwarf olives. With the very similar Olivella semistriata it forms the subgenus Pachyoliva. Both species are suspension feeders. They use unique appendages of the propodium (front part of the foot) to deploy mucus nets which capture suspended particles from the backwash on sandy beaches of the tropical eastern Pacific.

== Description ==
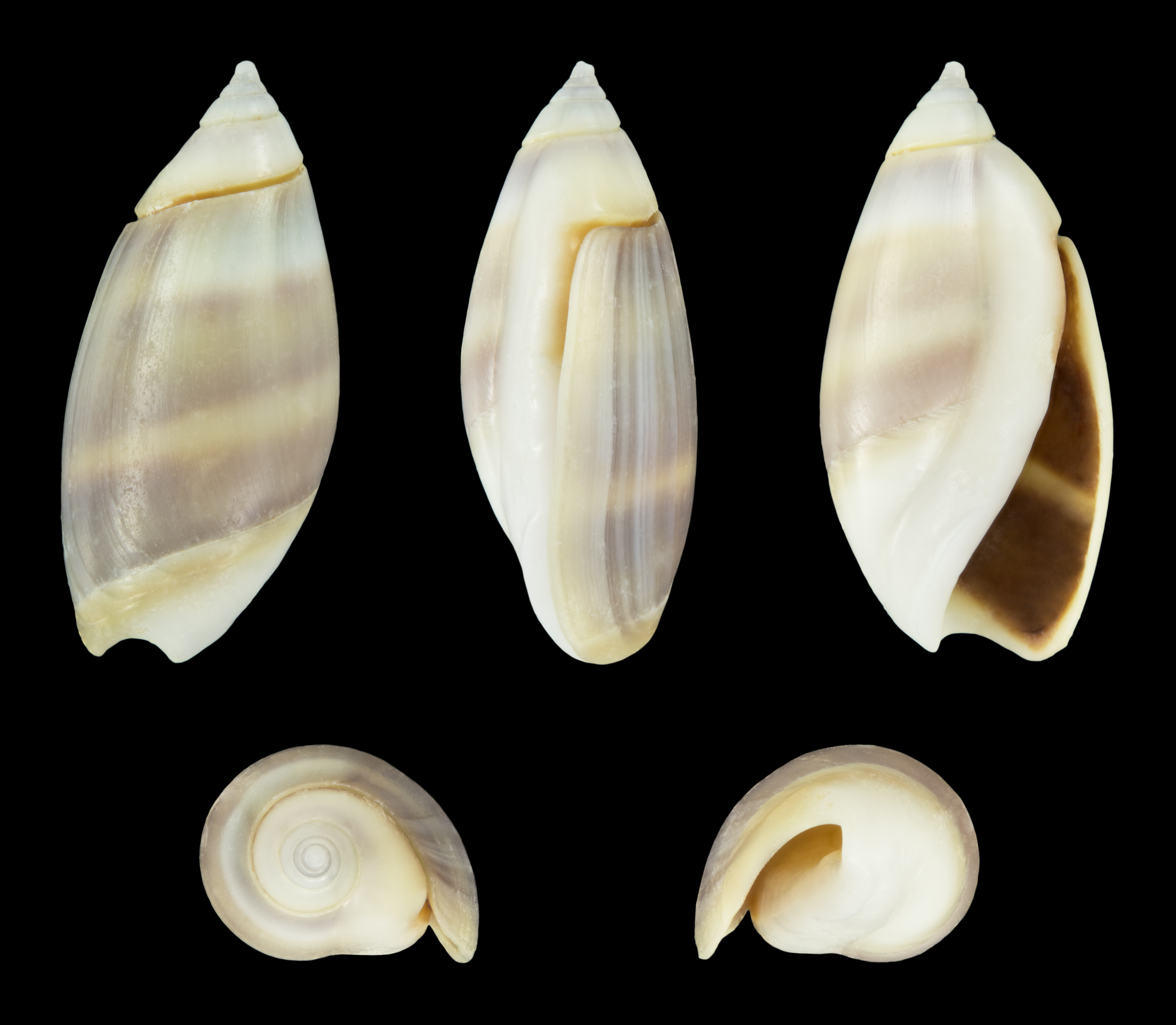
Shell

(this section compiled from)

Shell of oval shape, with relatively low and blunt spire and a large body whorl. The shell is smooth and shiny. The suture is open. The aperture is elongate. The inner lip (= the inner border of the aperture) is covered by very thick parietal callus that in mature animals extends beyond the aperture to the suture, where it may form a knob causing a pronounced kink in the outline of the shell in apertural view. Lirae (= ridges or plications) on the inner lip are lacking. The ground color is a dark brown or olive with a varying number (0 to 3) of lighter or darker, often fading bands. The fasciolar band (= a distinctly structured portion of the shell around the siphonal notch) is brownish gray to white. A chitinous (= horny) operculum is present.

The living animal is brownish gray with characteristic dark marks on the propodium, the front part of the foot. It lacks cephalic tentacles and eyes. As in all Olivellidae and the closely related Olividae, the propodium is separated by a pronounced groove from the main foot, the metapodium. In O. columellaris (as well as in O. semistriata), the lateral tips of the propodium are greatly extended and function in suspension feeding. The propodium is further divided into a left and a right half. The mouth opening which can be everted on a proboscis, is located on the dorsal face of the foot between the left and right lobes of the propodium.

== Distribution ==
The species is distributed along the American west coast from Nicaragua to Peru, according to the older literature. The assumption of such a wide distribution range, however, seems partly due to the fact that small individuals cannot be distinguished from small specimens of the more northerly distributed Olivella semistriata, and to the resulting misidentifications in museum collections and in the scientific literature. To date (2013) it appears unclear whether O. columellaris actually occurs north of Ecuador.
