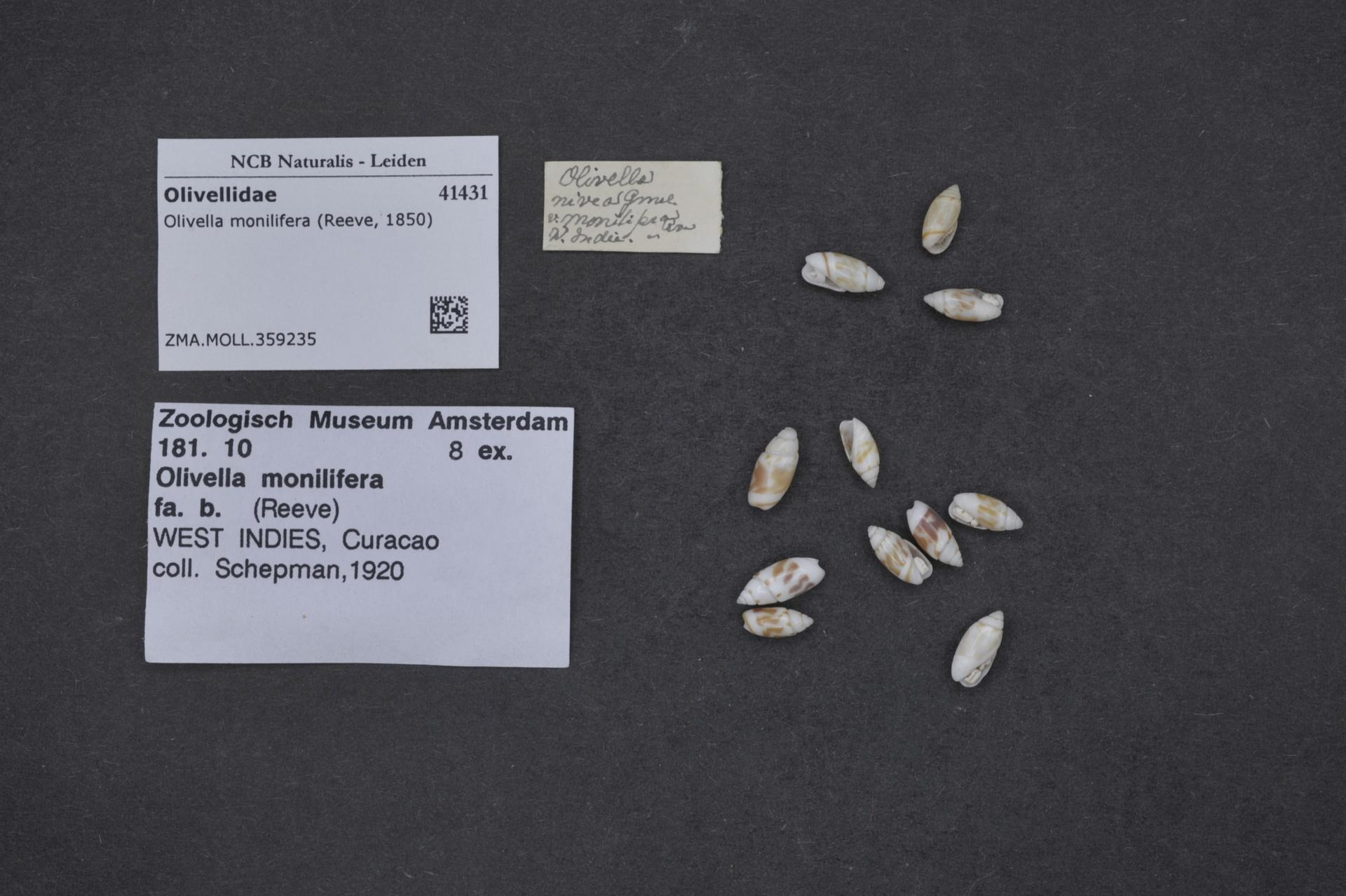

Scientific classification
- Kingdom: Animalia
- Phylum: Mollusca
- Class: Gastropoda
- Subclass: Caenogastropoda
- Order: Neogastropoda
- Family: Olividae
- Genus: Olivella
- Species: O. mica

Binomial name
- Olivella mica (Duclos, 1835)

Synonyms
- Oliva mica Duclos, 1835 (original combination); Oliva monilifera Reeve, 1850; Olivella dealbata (Reeve, 1850); Olivella monilifera (Reeve, 1850)

= Olivella mica =

Species of gastropod

Olivella mica is a species of small sea snail, marine gastropod mollusk in the subfamily Olivellinae, in the family Olividae, the olives. Species in the genus Olivella are commonly called dwarf olives.

== Description ==
Shell size 10-15 mm.

== Distribution ==
This species occurs in the Caribbean Sea off Jamaica and Martinique.
