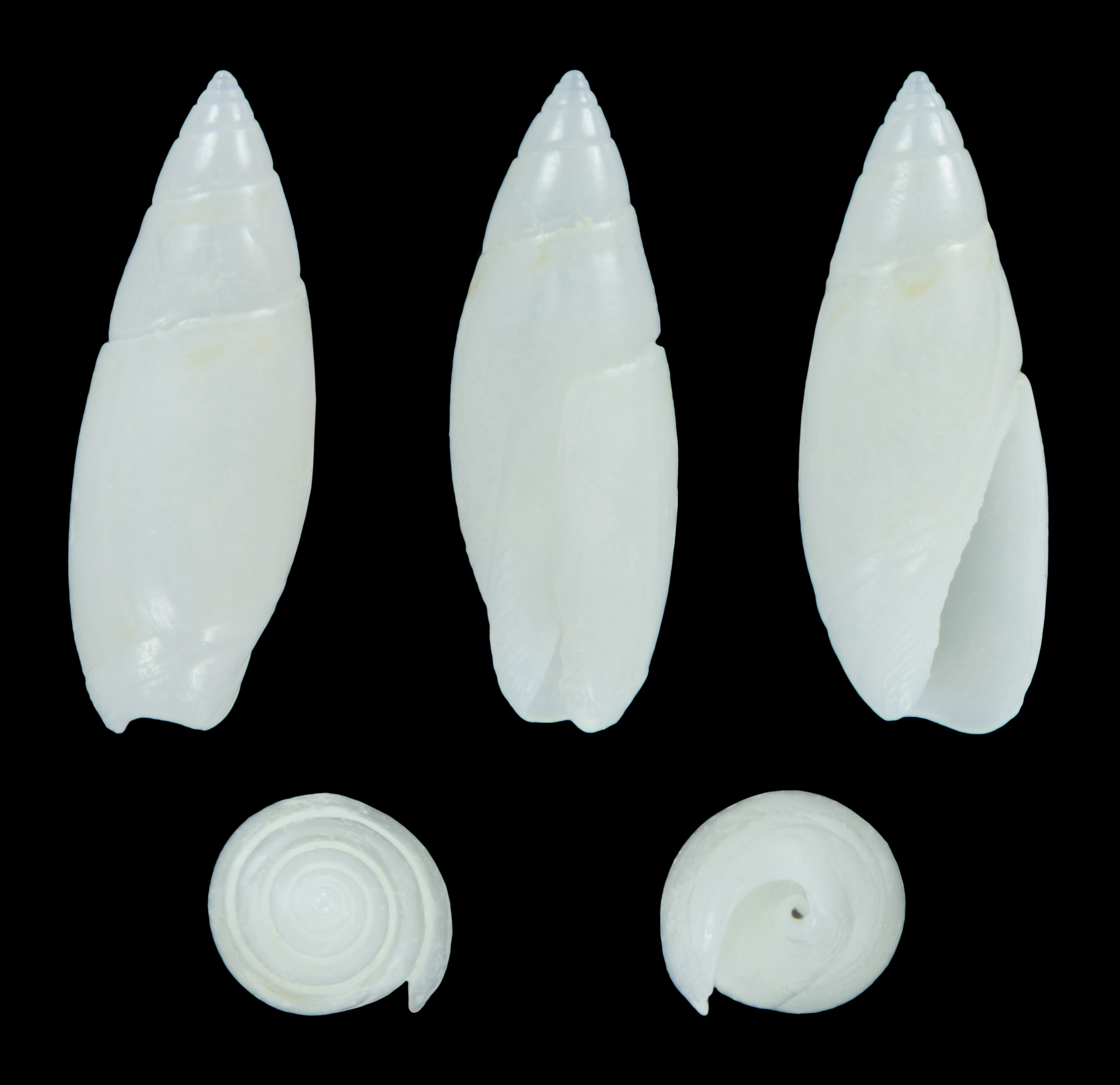

Scientific classification
- Kingdom: Animalia
- Phylum: Mollusca
- Class: Gastropoda
- Subclass: Caenogastropoda
- Order: Neogastropoda
- Family: Olividae
- Genus: Olivella
- Species: O. nivea

Binomial name
- Olivella nivea (Gmelin, 1791)

= Olivella nivea =

Species of gastropod

Olivella nivea, the snowy dwarf olive, is a species of small sea snail, marine gastropod mollusk in the subfamily Olivellinae, in the family Olividae, the olives. Species in the genus Olivella are commonly called dwarf olives.

== Description ==
The shell has an acutely pointed tip; entirely white, or marked by two bands of angulated purplish spots.
