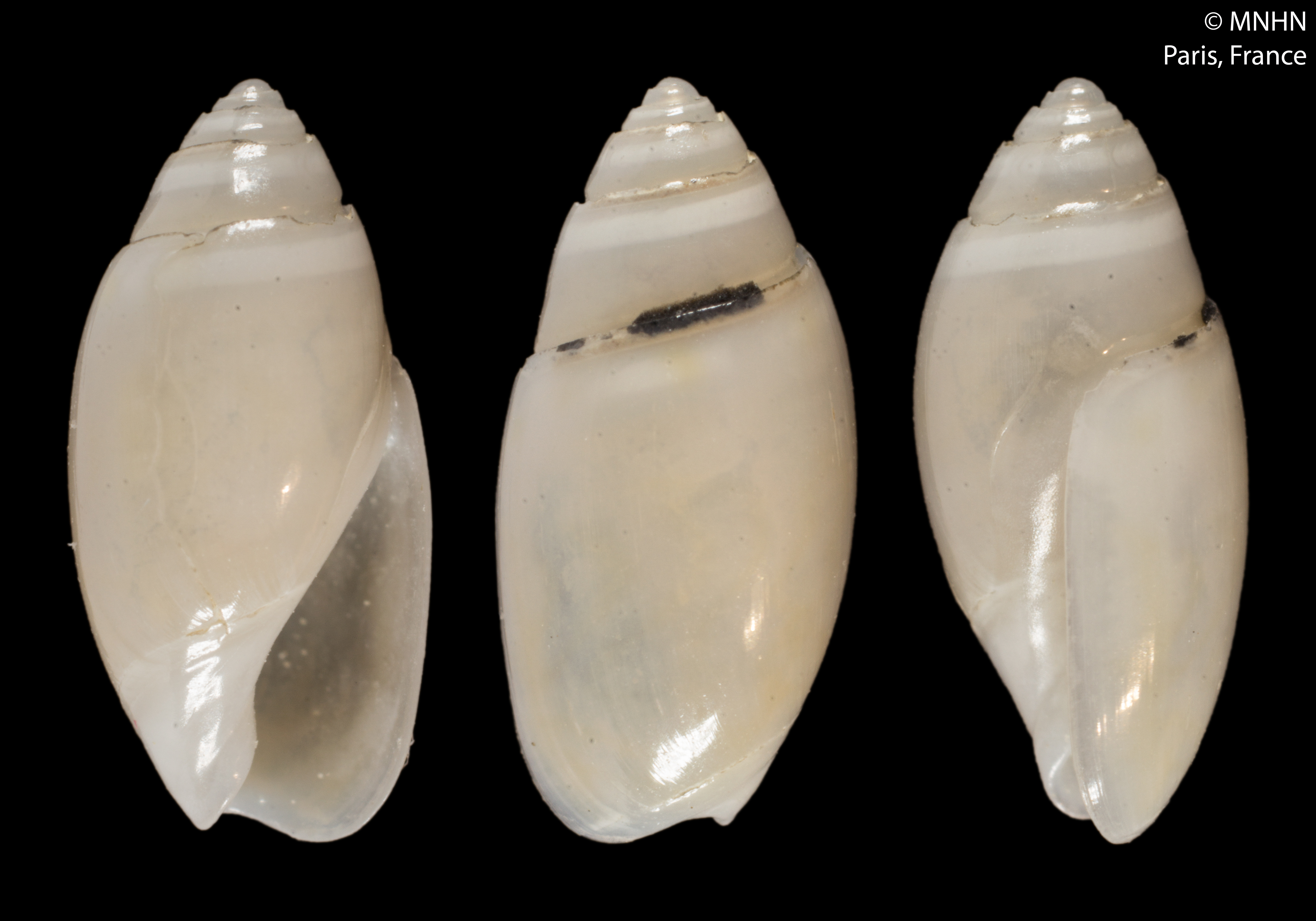
- Shell of Olivella hyphala (holotype at MNHN, Paris)

Scientific classification
- Kingdom: Animalia
- Phylum: Mollusca
- Class: Gastropoda
- Subclass: Caenogastropoda
- Order: Neogastropoda
- Family: Olividae
- Genus: Olivella
- Species: O. hyphala

Binomial name
- Olivella hyphala Absalão & Pimenta, 2003

Synonyms
- Olivella (Olivina) hyphala Absalão & Pimenta, 2003

= Olivella hyphala =

Species of gastropod

Olivella hyphala is a species of small sea snail, marine gastropod mollusk in the subfamily Olivellinae, in the family Olividae, the olives. Species in the genus Olivella are commonly called dwarf olives.

== Description ==
The length of the shell varies between 5 mm and 12 mm.

== Distribution ==
This marine species occurs off the Abrolhos Archipelago, East Brazil.
