= Olivella fletcherae =

Scientific classification
- Kingdom: Animalia
- Phylum: Mollusca
- Class: Gastropoda
- Subclass: Caenogastropoda
- Order: Neogastropoda
- Family: Olividae
- Genus: Olivella
- Species: O. fletcherae

Binomial name
- Olivella fletcherae Berry, 1958

Species of gastropod

Olivella fletcherae is a species of small sea snail, marine gastropod mollusk in the subfamily Olivellinae, in the family Olividae, the olives. Species in the genus Olivella are commonly called dwarf olives.

== Distribution ==
O. fletcherae is found on the west coast of Panama and Mexico.
