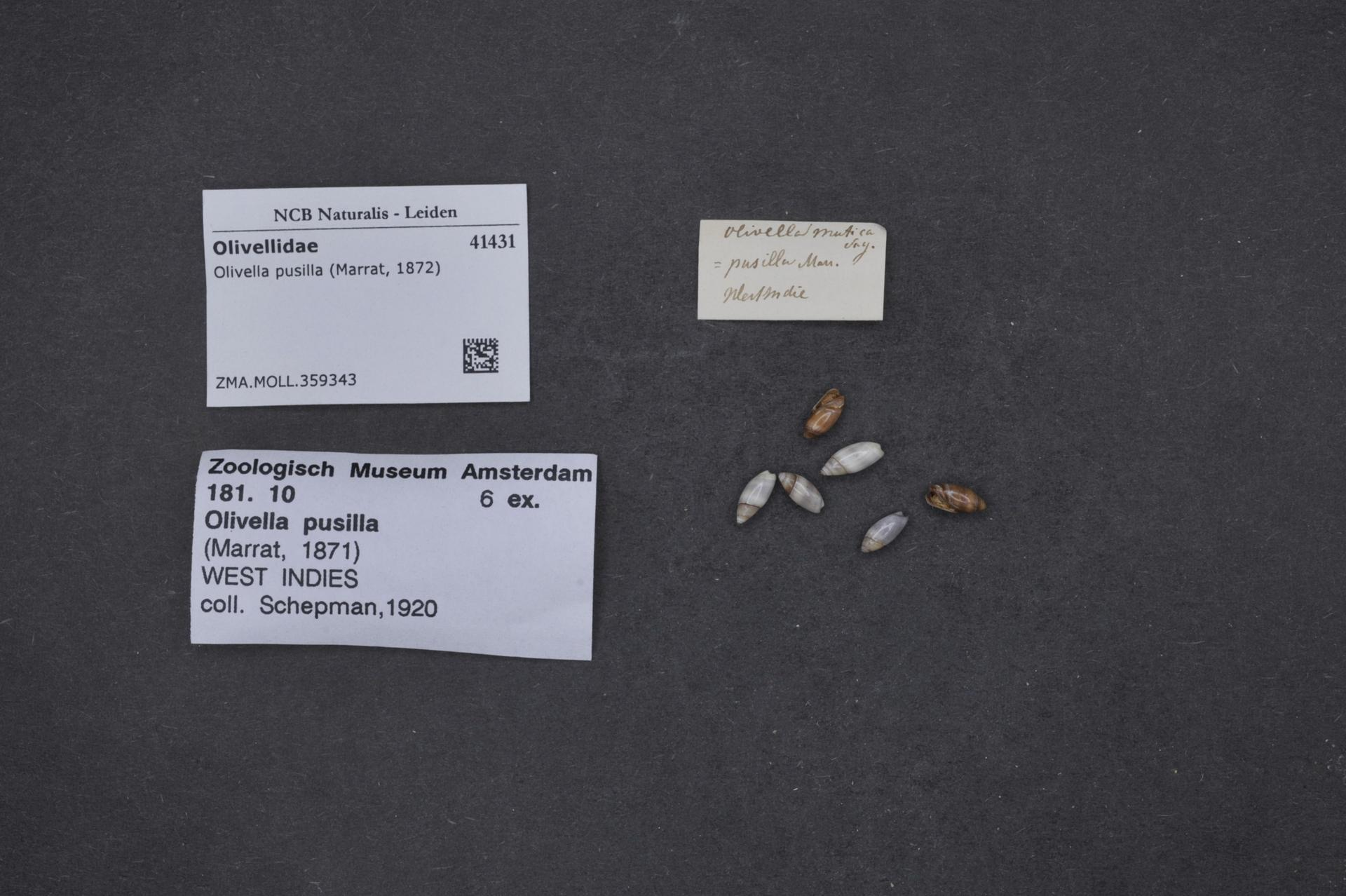
- Naturalis Biodiversity Center - ZMA.MOLL.359343 - Olivella pusilla (Marrat, 1872) - Olivellidae - Mollusc shell

Scientific classification
- Kingdom: Animalia
- Phylum: Mollusca
- Class: Gastropoda
- Subclass: Caenogastropoda
- Order: Neogastropoda
- Family: Olividae
- Genus: Olivella
- Species: O. pusilla

Binomial name
- Olivella pusilla (Marrat, 1871)

= Olivella pusilla =

Species of gastropod

Olivella pusilla is a species of small sea snail, marine gastropod mollusk in the subfamily Olivellinae, in the family Olividae, the olives. Species in the genus Olivella are commonly called dwarf olives.

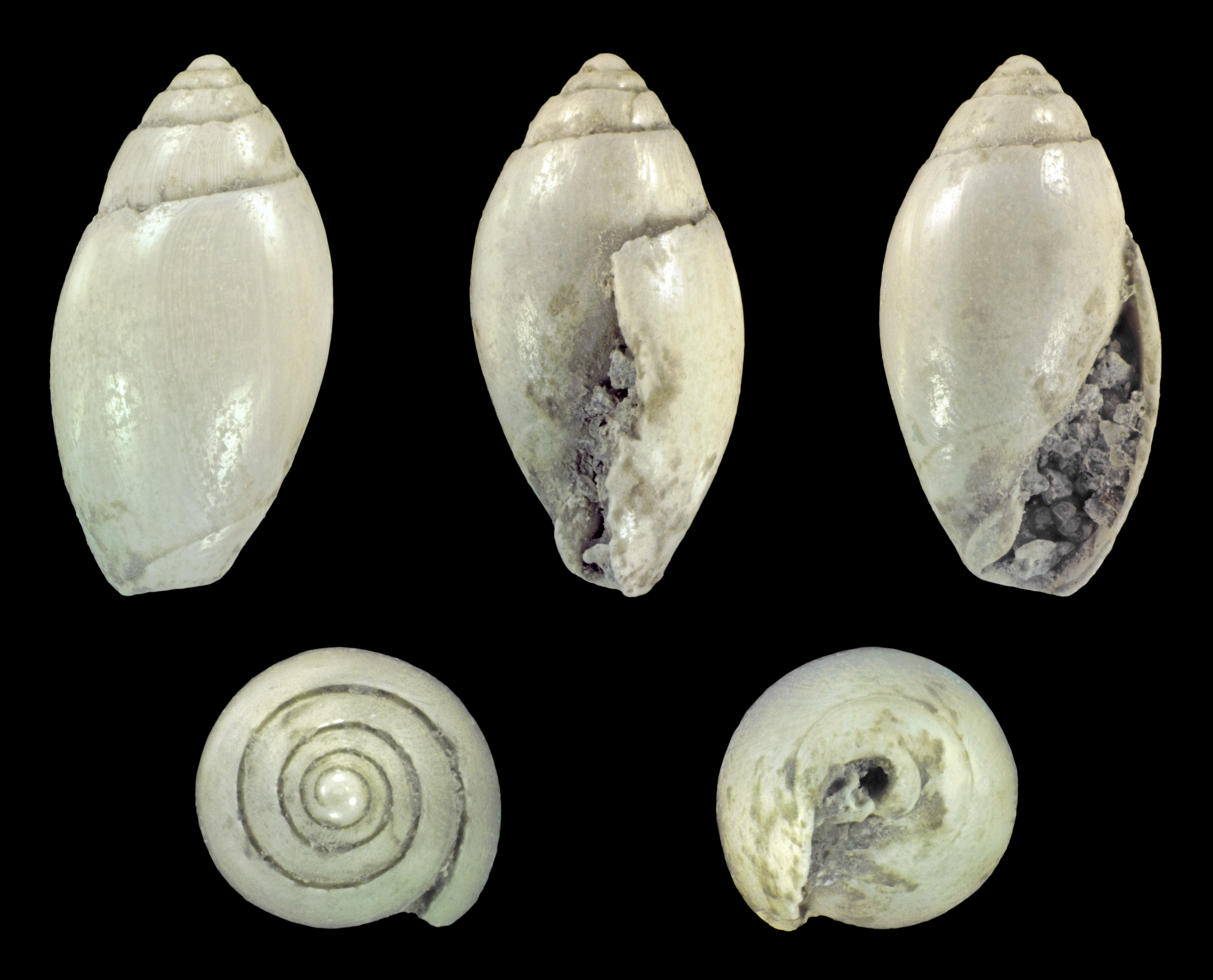
Fossil (Pliocene, Florida)
