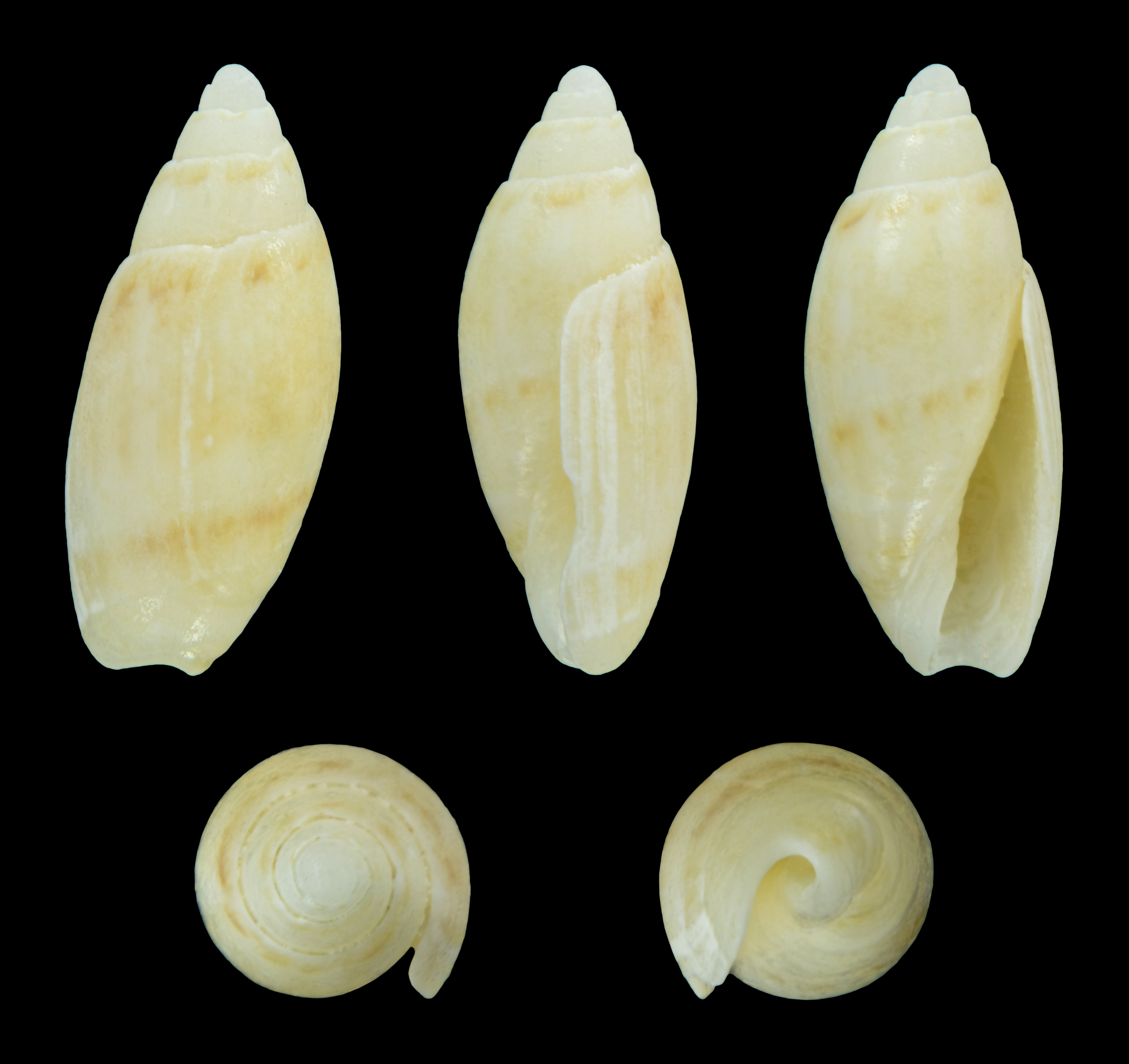

Scientific classification
- Kingdom: Animalia
- Phylum: Mollusca
- Class: Gastropoda
- Subclass: Caenogastropoda
- Order: Neogastropoda
- Family: Olividae
- Genus: Olivella
- Species: O. lactea

Binomial name
- Olivella lactea (Marrat, 1871)

Synonyms
- Olivella adelae Olsson, 1956; Olivella (Olivella) lactea (Marrat, 1871)

= Olivella lactea =

Species of gastropod

Olivella lactea is a species of small sea snail, marine gastropod mollusk in the subfamily Olivellinae, in the family Olividae, the olives. Species in the genus Olivella are commonly called dwarf olives.

== Description ==
Original description: "Shell of medium size (length about 12 mm.), subovate, thin or of medium texture, with a rather high body-whorl and an elevated, evenly conic spire half the total length. Sutures linear, grooved, the edge of the whorl in front forming a narrow, slightly overhanging collar. Parietal callus extending weakly beyond the end of aperture about halfway to the suture, the pillar structure formed by a few small lirations which end sharply at the edge of the excavation of the pillar wall. Color is a leaden white except for a band of broken brown spots below the suture and another arranged at the edge of the fasciole, the fasciole itself white; the spire may be of uniform color or in some cases much darker approaching a blotched black. Radular ribbon like that of nivea but much smaller (a ribbon with about 30 rows of teeth has a length of 1.20 mm, the rachidian tooth about.18 mm. wide (longer diameter). The paired medial cusps of the rachidian tooth are more widely separated with smaller accessory ones between."

The length of the shell varies between 8 mm and 13 mm.

== Distribution ==
It has been found off La Guajira along the northern Caribbean coast of Colombia., in the Gulf of Mexico and off the Lesser Antilles.
