= Olivella moorei =

Scientific classification
- Kingdom: Animalia
- Phylum: Mollusca
- Class: Gastropoda
- Subclass: Caenogastropoda
- Order: Neogastropoda
- Family: Olividae
- Genus: Olivella
- Species: O. moorei

Binomial name
- Olivella moorei Abbot, 1951

Species of sea snail

Olivella moorei is a species of small sea snail, marine gastropod mollusk in the subfamily Olivellinae, in the family Olividae, the olives. Species in the genus Olivella are commonly called dwarf olives.

== Description ==
Original description: "Adults 7 to 8 mm. in length, moderately elongate, rather thin, glossy, translucent with bright dark-brown axial streaks, and with 4 to 5 whorls. Nuclear whorl of one revolution, large, quite bulbous, glassy-white. Postnuclear whorls flattish above, moderately convex below, gradually descending. Sutural channel deep, very narrow; and the side of the preceding whorl is not etched. Aperture lanceolate, constricted above, wide and open below, and about 6/10 the total length of the shell. Outer lip thin, sharp, very slightly turned inward near the upper third, and projecting slightly downward at its lower, outer corner. Inner lip smooth, with or without a weak, elongate, glazed columellar callus which is often microscopically scratched with fine, sharp threads. Anal fasciole bordered above by a single, fine spiral thread. The columella below this line has an abrupt, angular S-shaped indentation. Base of columella swollen into a rather wide, large twisted fold. Anal fasciole white with a few short spiral brown bars. Color of whorls translucent with a small, solid, spiral band of light-brown just below the suture and numerous long, wavy, axial flammules of reddish brown on the sides. Interior of aperture white, sometimes faintly tinted with tan. Operculum similar to O. bayeri. Verge in males vermiform, about as half as long as the shell."

== Distribution ==
Locus typicus: "3 miles, 100˚ from Carysfort Reef, off Key Largo, Florida, USA."
