= Olivella rehderi =

Scientific classification
- Kingdom: Animalia
- Phylum: Mollusca
- Class: Gastropoda
- Subclass: Caenogastropoda
- Order: Neogastropoda
- Family: Olividae
- Genus: Olivella
- Species: O. rehderi

Binomial name
- Olivella rehderi Olsson, 1956

Species of gastropod

Olivella rehderi is a species of small sea snail, marine gastropod mollusk in the subfamily Olivellinae, in the family Olividae, the olives. Species in the genus Olivella are commonly called dwarf olives.

== Description ==
Original description: "Shell small (length 7 to 8 mm.), rather light and thin, with an elevated, turreted spire of about 6 whorls, nearly half the total length. Sutures are widely grooved, the collar-like edge of the forward whorl rather narrow. Parietal callus extends to the upper suture of the penultimate whorl, heaviest at the posterior end of aperture. Pillar structure formed by 4 or 5 descending, strong lirations on the anterior portion of the columella. Color a dull white or cream, and slightly variegated with faint spots or flammules of brown arranged roughly in 3 zones, an upper set of spots just below the suture, the other two around the middle and base. Fasciole white. Length 7.7 mm., diameter 3.3 mm."

Olivella rehderi is native to the country of Ecuador.

Average size is 5.3 millimetres; the shells are muted but attractive colors; they may also have some kind of patterning.

== Distribution ==
Locus typicus: "Panama Bay, Panama."
