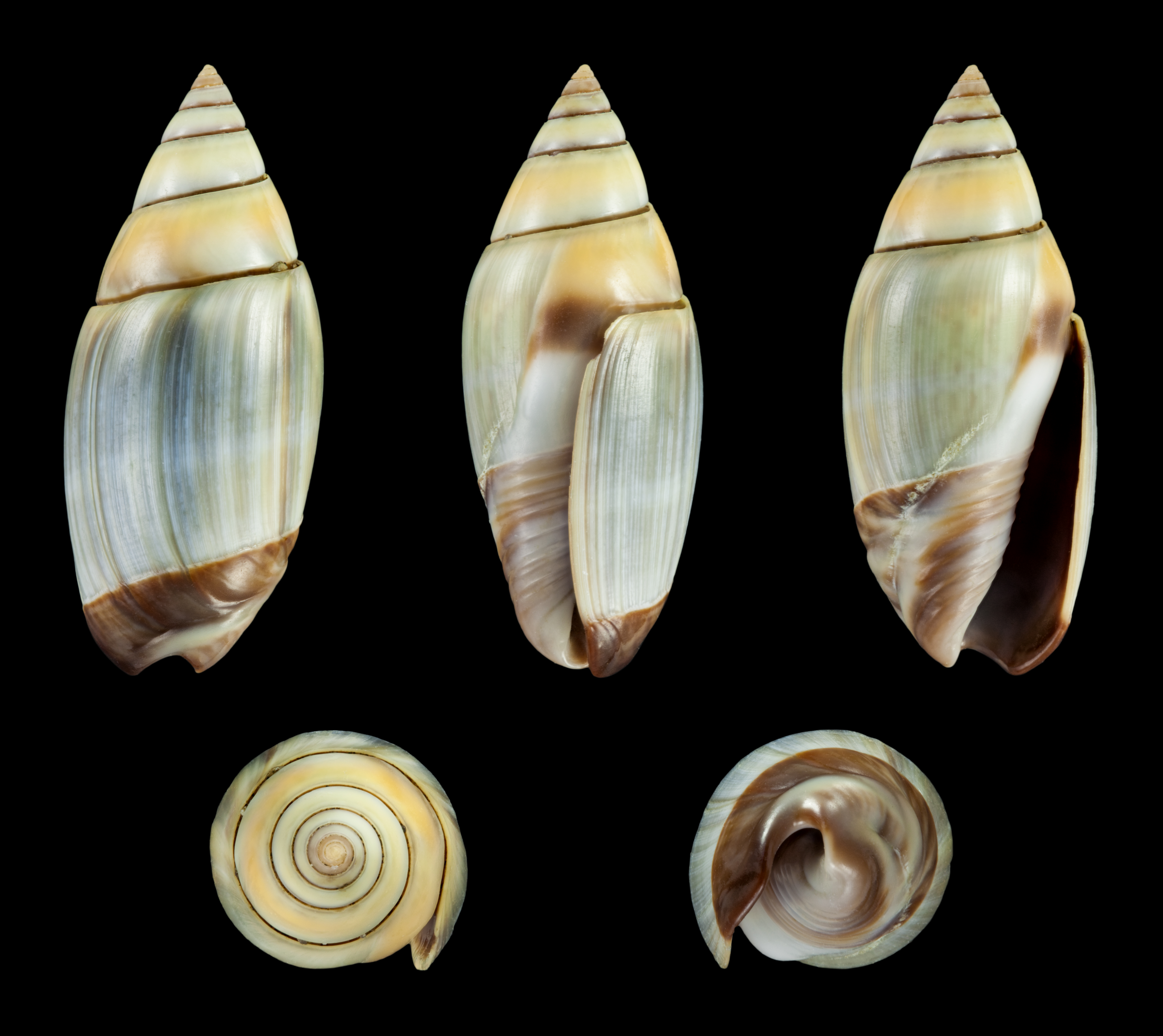
- Shell of Olivella volutella

Scientific classification
- Kingdom: Animalia
- Phylum: Mollusca
- Class: Gastropoda
- Subclass: Caenogastropoda
- Order: Neogastropoda
- Family: Olividae
- Genus: Olivella
- Species: O. volutella

Binomial name
- Olivella volutella (Lamarck, 1811)

Synonyms
- Mitra affinis Lesson, 1842; Oliva razamola Duclos, 1835

= Olivella volutella =

Species of gastropod

Olivella volutella is a species of small sea snail, marine gastropod mollusk in the subfamily Olivellinae, in the family Olividae, the olives. Species in the genus Olivella are commonly called dwarf olives.

== Description ==
The length of the shell varies between 12 mm and 25 mm.

== Distribution ==
This marine species occurs off Panama and off Gambier Islands (French Polynesia).
