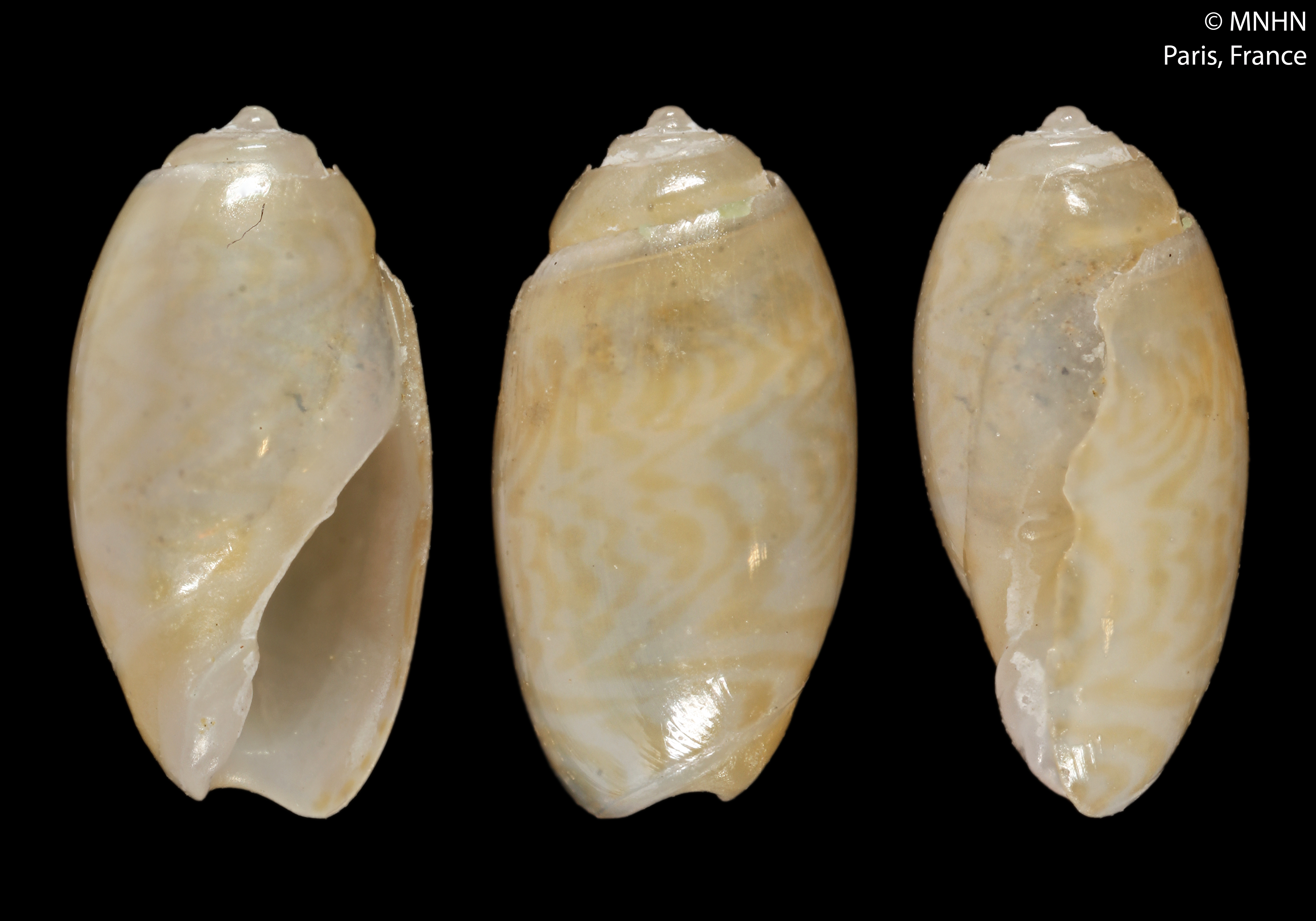
- Shell of Olivella miliola (syntype at MNHN, Paris)

Scientific classification
- Kingdom: Animalia
- Phylum: Mollusca
- Class: Gastropoda
- Subclass: Caenogastropoda
- Order: Neogastropoda
- Family: Olividae
- Genus: Olivella
- Species: O. miliola

Binomial name
- Olivella miliola (d'Orbigny, 1842)

Synonyms
- Oliva (Olivina) miliola d'Orbigny, 1842; Oliva miliola d'Orbigny, 1842 (original combination); Oliva miliola Duclos, 1844 (homonym and synonym of Oliva miliola d'Orbigny, 1842); Olivella microspira Paulmier, 2007

= Olivella miliola =

Species of gastropod

Olivella miliola is a species of small sea snail, marine gastropod mollusk in the subfamily Olivellinae, in the family Olividae, the olives. Species in the genus Olivella are commonly called dwarf olives.

== Description ==
The length of the shell varies between 4 mm and 5 mm.

Members of this order are predominantly gonochoric broadcast spawners. Members grow from the embryonic stage to planktonic trochophore larvae to juvenile veligers before reaching their adult stage.

== Distribution ==
O. miliola is a demersal sea snail and can be found in the tropical regions of the Western Atlantic. Also off Jamaica and Martinique; also on the Mid-Atlantic Ridge.
