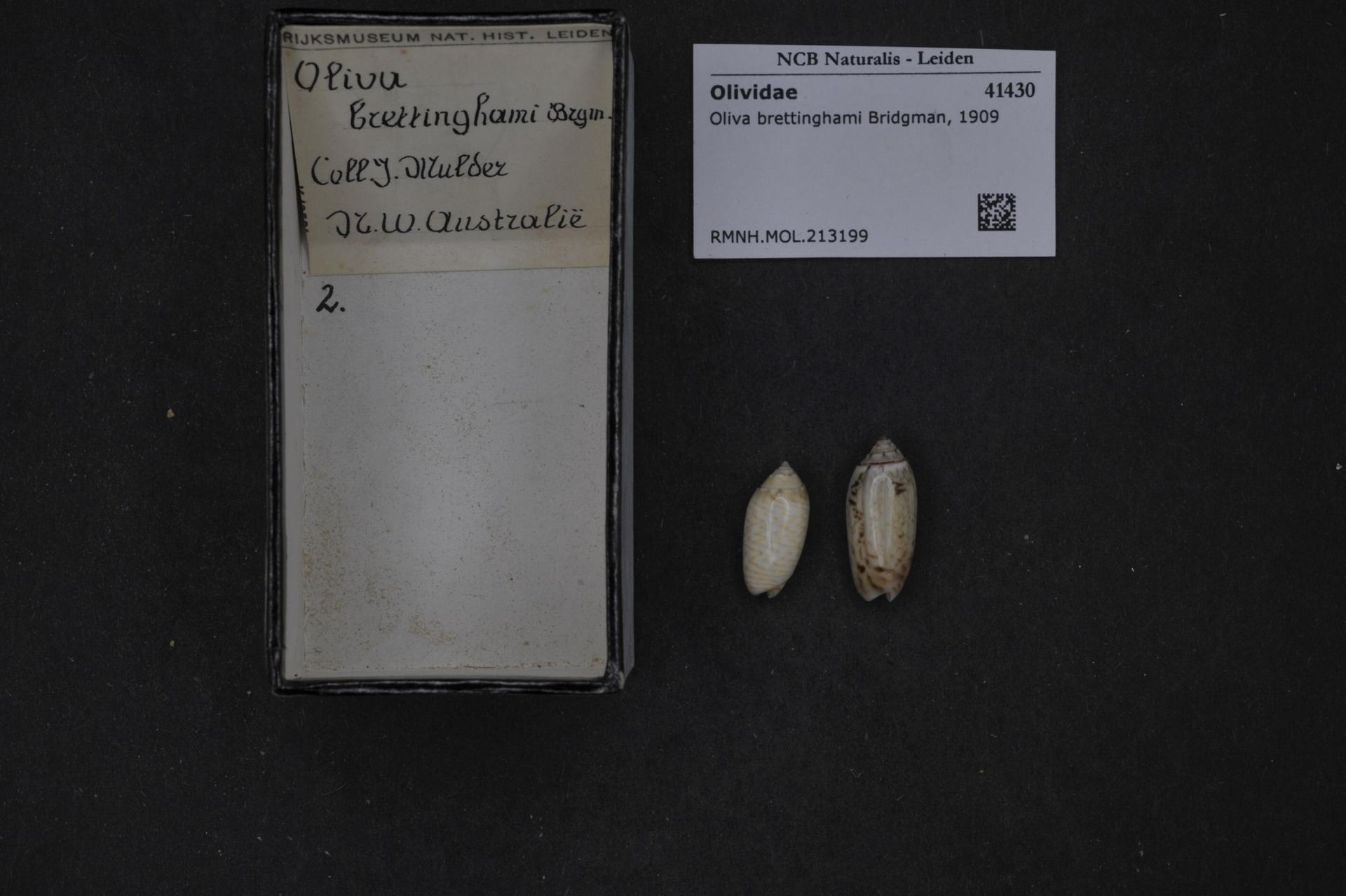

Scientific classification
- Kingdom: Animalia
- Phylum: Mollusca
- Class: Gastropoda
- Subclass: Caenogastropoda
- Order: Neogastropoda
- Family: Olividae
- Genus: Oliva
- Species: O. brettinghami

Binomial name
- Oliva brettinghami Bridgman, 1909

Synonyms
- Oliva caldania Duclos, 1835

= Oliva brettinghami =

Species of gastropod

Oliva brettinghami is a species of small sea snail, marine gastropod mollusk in the subfamily Olivellinae, in the family Olividae, the olives. Species in the genus Olivella are commonly called dwarf olives.
