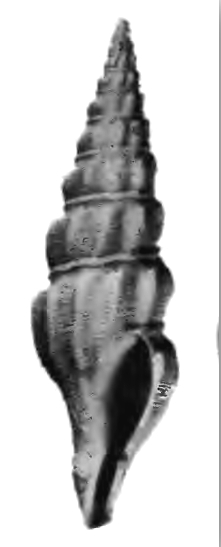
- Original image of a shell of Crassispira hataii

Scientific classification
- Kingdom: Animalia
- Phylum: Mollusca
- Class: Gastropoda
- Subclass: Caenogastropoda
- Order: Neogastropoda
- Superfamily: Conoidea
- Family: Pseudomelatomidae
- Genus: Crassispira
- Species: C. hataii

Binomial name
- Crassispira hataii (.S. MacNeil, 1960

= Crassispira hataii =

Extinct species of gastropod

Crassispira hataii is an extinct species of sea snail, a marine gastropod mollusk in the family Pseudomelatomidae, the turrids and allies.

== Description ==
The length of the shell attains 30 mm, its diameter 9 mm.

(Original description) The shell is of medium size and inflation. The whorls are sharply rounded in profile. The protoconch is somewhat eroded, but apparently consisting of three whorls, conical, and smooth. The aperture is of medium width, produced anteriorly to form a short canal;. There is only a slight indication of a siphonal notch. Outer lip gently curving. The anal sinus is sharp, but of only moderate depth. The sculpture consists of coarse axial ribs, slightly inclined to the right towards the apex, six visible from an angle; delicate but distinctly raised spiral lines crossing the axial ribs and interspaces alike, some of the spiral interspaces with secondary line. The anal fasciole bears lines of about the same width, but with less relief. The subsutural slope has a moderately strong subsutural collar and below it a sharp, concave anal fasciole.

== Distribution ==
Fossils have been found in Miocene strata in Okinawa, Japan.
