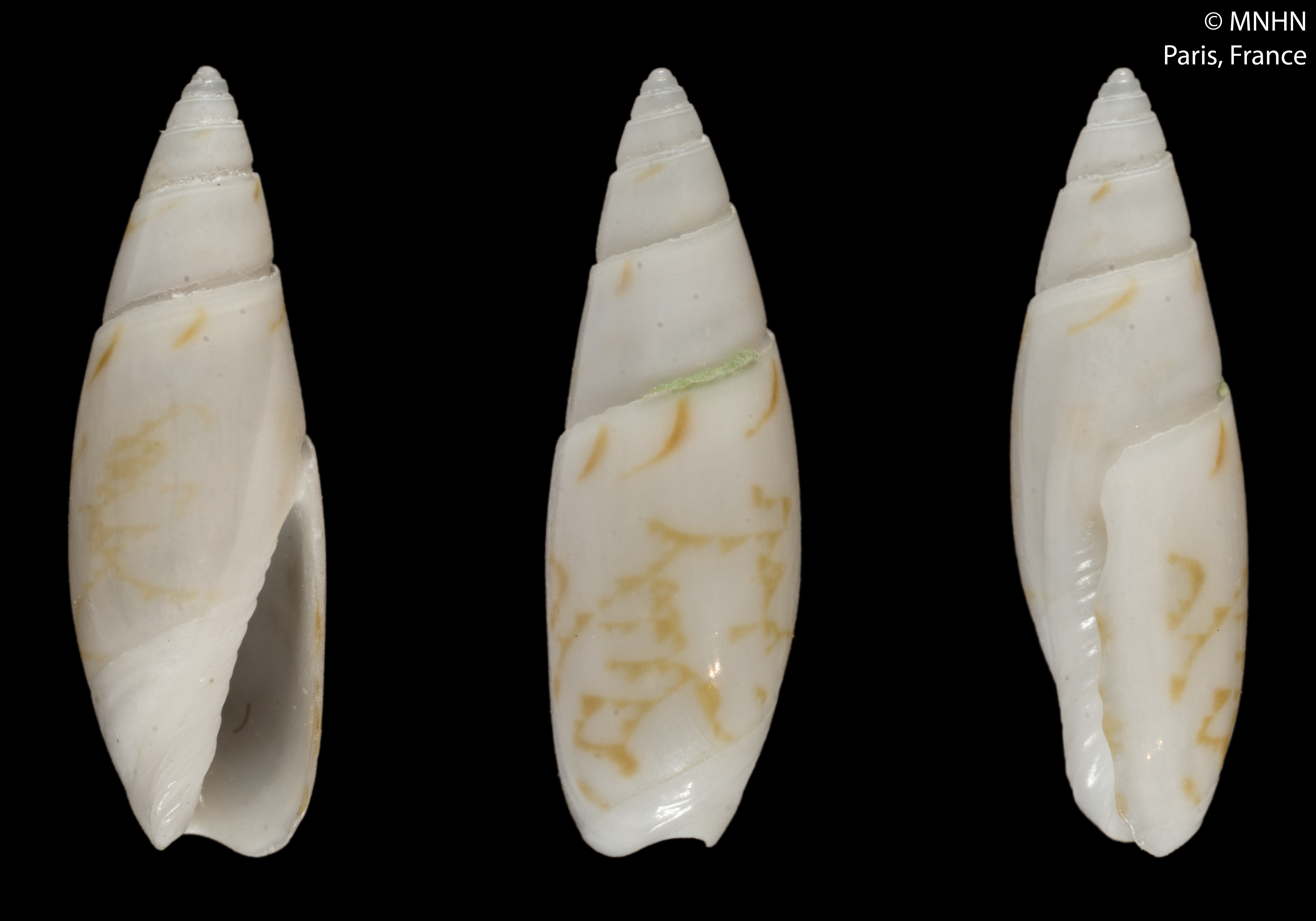
- Olivella floralia Duclos, 1844

Scientific classification
- Kingdom: Animalia
- Phylum: Mollusca
- Class: Gastropoda
- Subclass: Caenogastropoda
- Order: Neogastropoda
- Family: Olividae
- Genus: Olivella
- Species: O. floralia

Binomial name
- Olivella floralia Duclos in Chenu, 1844

Synonyms
- Oliva floralia Duclos, 1844; Oliva oryza Duclos, 1835 (invalid: junior homonym of Oliva oryza Lamarck, 1811); Olivella (Olivella) floralia Duclos, 1844

= Olivella floralia =

Species of gastropod

Olivella floralia, common name the common rice (dwarf) olive, is a species of small sea snail, marine gastropod mollusk in the subfamily Olivellinae, within the family Olividae, the olives. Species in the genus Olivella are commonly called dwarf olives.

== Description ==
The length of the shell of this species varies between 6 mm and 15 mm. The shell is slender and mostly white, with upper whorls which are white to blue or purple.

== Distribution ==
Olivella floralia is found in the Caribbean. It is also found off of North Carolina, USA, to Colombia and East Brazil.
