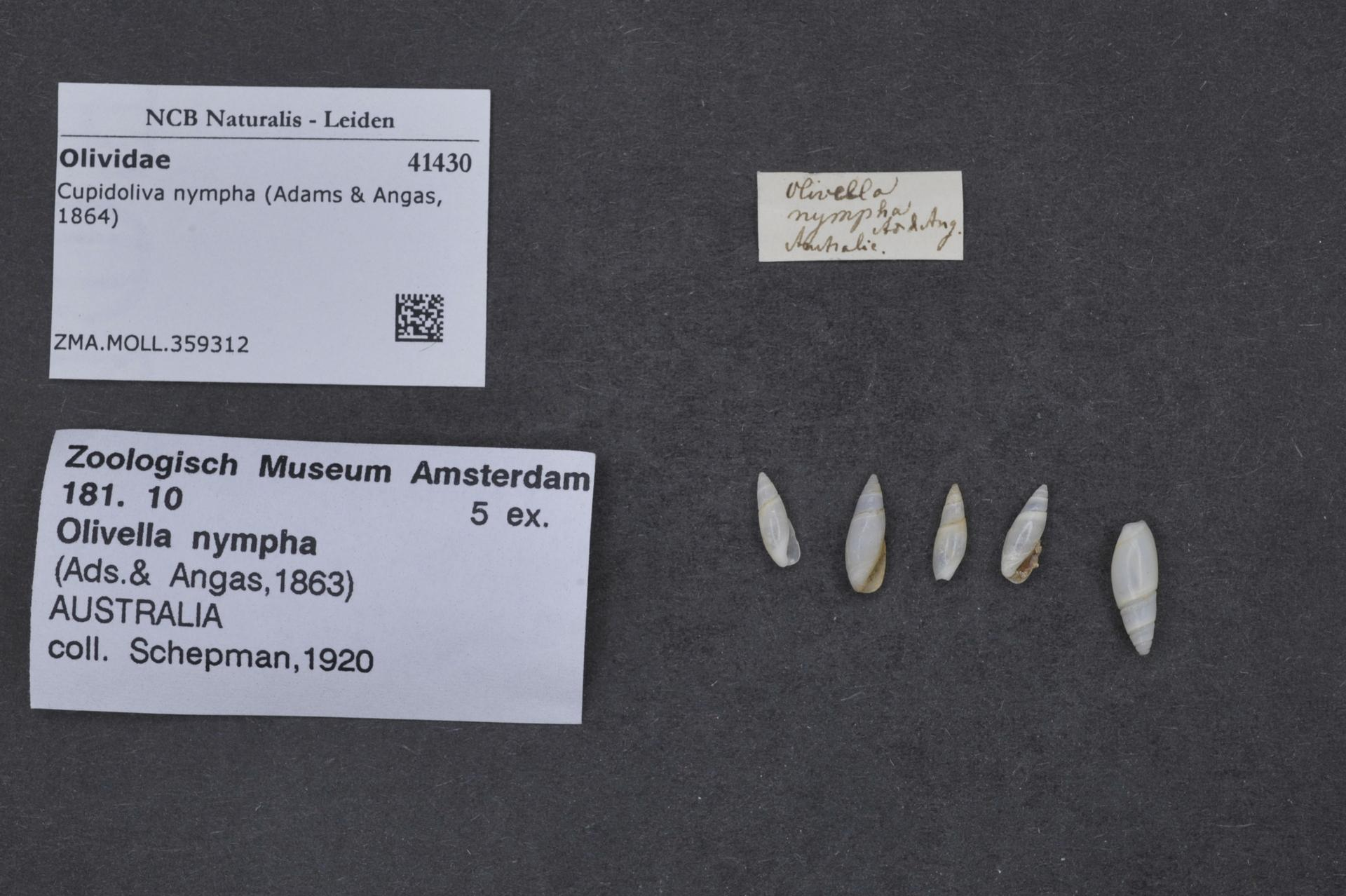

Scientific classification
- Kingdom: Animalia
- Phylum: Mollusca
- Class: Gastropoda
- Subclass: Caenogastropoda
- Order: Neogastropoda
- Family: Olividae
- Genus: Cupidoliva
- Species: C. nympha

Binomial name
- Cupidoliva nympha (A. Adams & Angas, 1864)

= Cupidoliva nympha =

Species of gastropod

Cupidoliva nympha is an Australian species of sea snail, a marine gastropod mollusc in the family Olividae, the olives. Originally described in the genus Olivella by Arthur Adams in 1864, and later as the type of a subgenus by Axel Olsson in 1956, it is currently considered the type species of Cupidoliva as per Tom Iredale in 1924.

== Description ==
This small-medium species attains a length of 15 mm, though usually being smaller. It closely resembles Olivella, in the radula with a multicuspid rhachidian (central) tooth, having an operculum unlike the genus Oliva, and swimming using metapodial flaps like in O. minuta. The shell is white and semi-opaque, slender, and spindle-shaped, with a high spire, deep suture channels, a narrow aperture flattened towards the front, a thin and smooth lip, a thick and wide fasciole around the aperture, a folded pillar on a smooth columella with a two-pointed bottom, and a weak callus at the end of the aperture.

== Distribution ==
This species occurs off the coast of Australia, first being described from Port Stephens in New South Wales.
