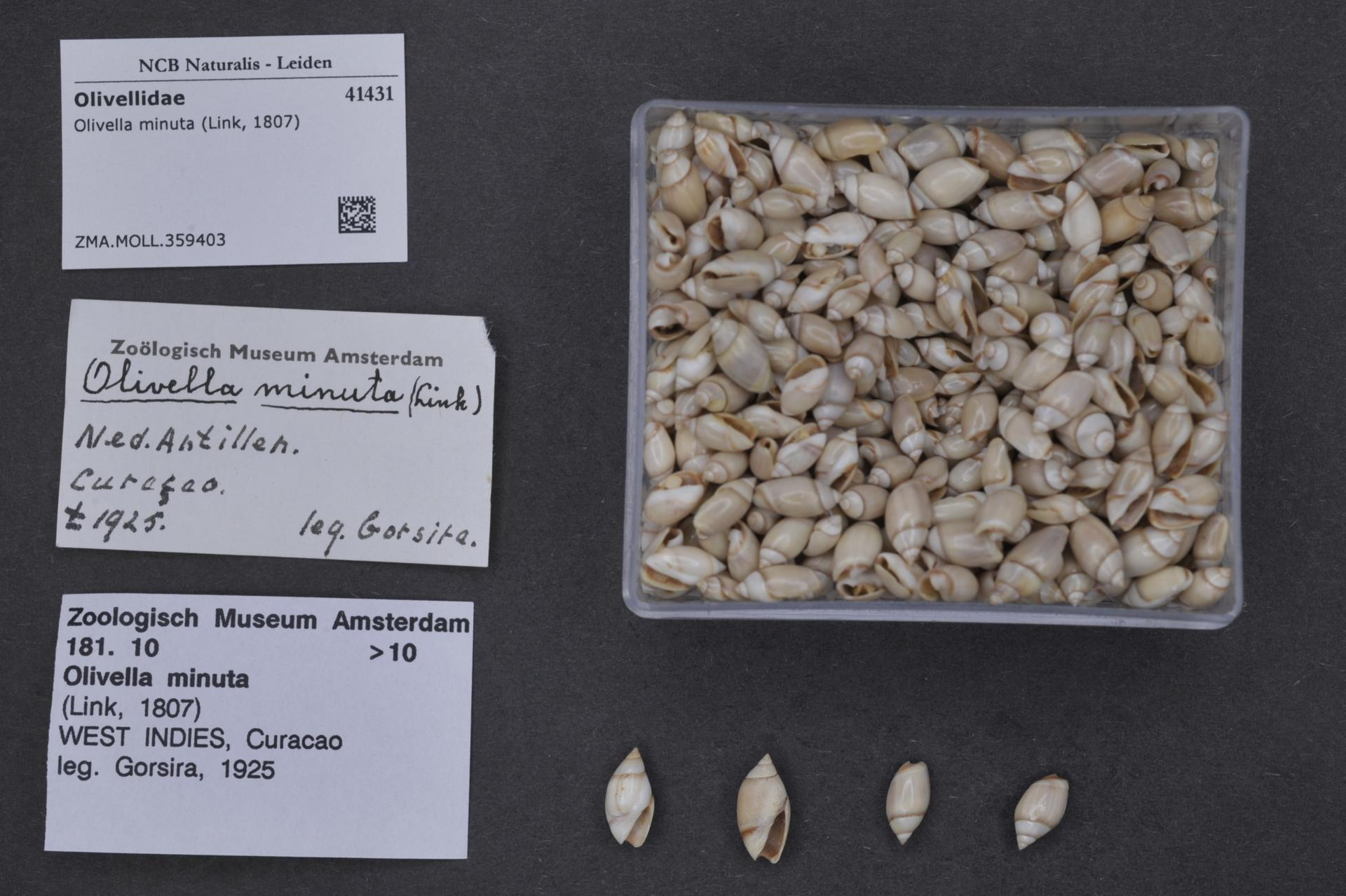

Scientific classification
- Kingdom: Animalia
- Phylum: Mollusca
- Class: Gastropoda
- Subclass: Caenogastropoda
- Order: Neogastropoda
- Family: Olividae
- Genus: Olivella
- Species: O. minuta

Binomial name
- Olivella minuta (Link, 1807)

Synonyms
- Oliva cyanea Reeve, 1850; Oliva petiolita Duclos, 1844; Oliva verreauxii Ducros de Saint Germain, 1857; Oliva zigzag Duclos, 1835; Olivella (Niteoliva) minuta (Link, 1807)· accepted, alternate representation; Olivella (Niteoliva) verreauxii (Ducros de Saint Germain, 1857) accepted, alternate representation; Olivella petiolita (Duclos, 1835); Olivella verreauxii (Ducros de Saint Germain, 1857); Porphyria minuta Link, 1807 (original combination); Voluta nitidula Dillwyn, 1817

= Olivella minuta =

Species of gastropod

Olivella minuta, common name the minute dwarf olive, is a species of small sea snail, marine gastropod mollusk in the subfamily Olivellinae, in the family Olividae, the olives. Species in the genus Olivella are commonly called dwarf olives.

== Description ==
The size of the shell varies between 6 mm and 15 mm.

This species has a small, oblong shell which comes to a conical point on the front end, similar to other marine snail shells. The shell has brown patterning on the middle section that can range from chevron patterns to random dispersements of lines and blotches. The common size is 13 mm, though specimens can grow larger.

== Distribution ==
This marine species is widely distributed in the seas of the Western Hemisphere. It lives in the tropical waters of the Caribbean Sea, the Gulf of Mexico and off the Lesser Antilles. The species can be found off the coasts of Colombia, San Andres, Jamaica, Mexico, Panama, and Puerto Rico, and has been found as far south as Argentina in suitable warm waters.
