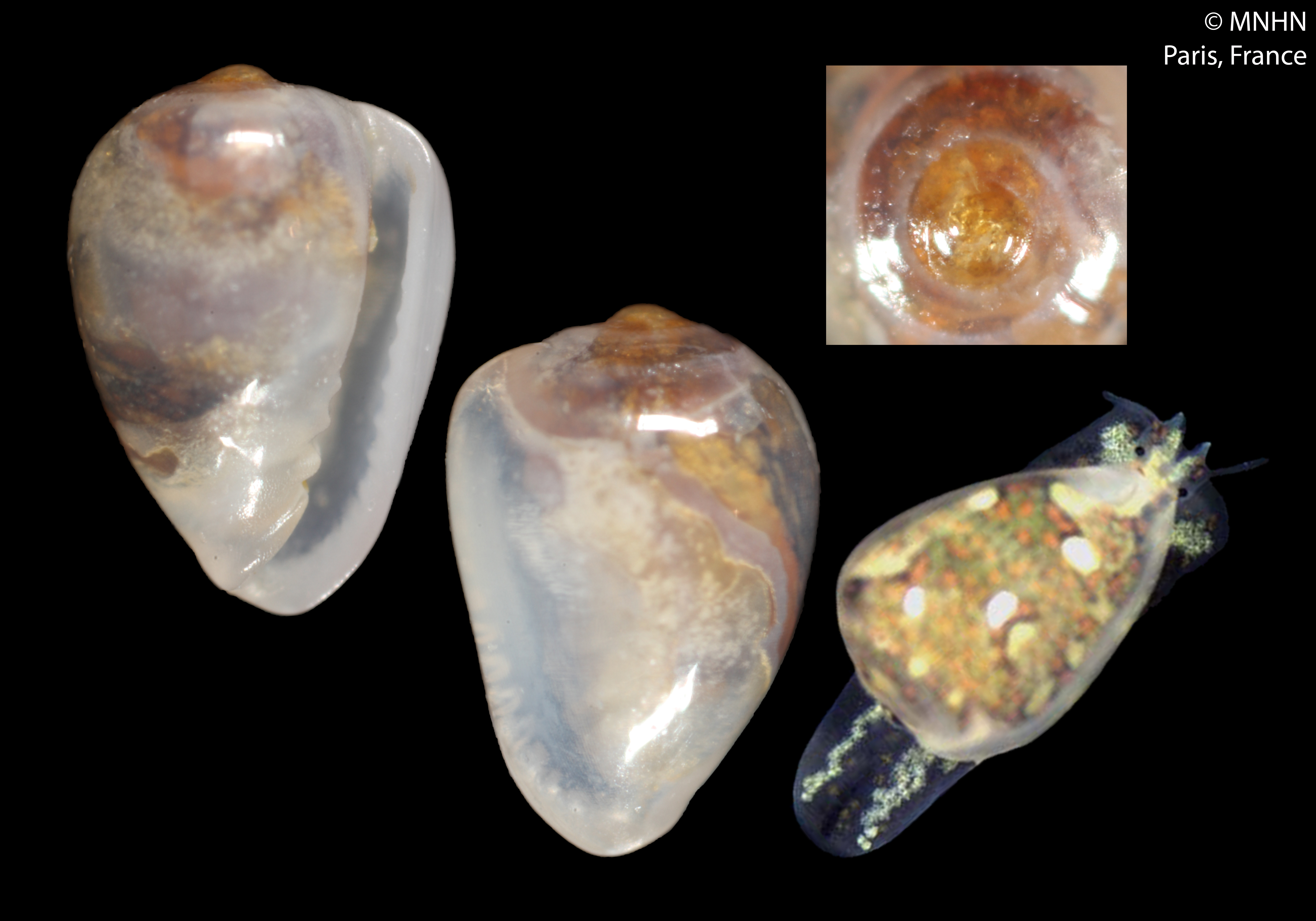
- Shell of Gibberula oriens (holotype at MNHN, Paris)

Scientific classification
- Kingdom: Animalia
- Phylum: Mollusca
- Class: Gastropoda
- Subclass: Caenogastropoda
- Order: Neogastropoda
- Family: Cystiscidae
- Subfamily: Cystiscinae
- Genus: Gibberula
- Species: G. oriens

Binomial name
- Gibberula oriens McCleery, 2008

= Gibberula oriens =

Species of gastropod

Gibberula oriens is a species of very small sea snail, a marine gastropod mollusk or micromollusk in the family Cystiscidae.

== Etymology ==
The Latin translation for 'east' is 'oriens', and that portion of the name alludes to its eastern Caribbean distribution.

== Description ==
The length of the shell attains 1.84 mm.

=== Shell ===
The shell is smooth, shiny, and semi-transparent, with a broadly triangular outline. Adult size ranges from 1.76 × 1.29 mm to 1.89 × 1.37 mm, yielding a width-to-length ratio of 70-76%. The spire is very low; the flanks are smooth; the apex is slightly pointed. The suture is indistinct and rises toward a high labial insertion nearly level with the apex. The shoulder and posterior notch are moderately developed. The outer lip is straight, wide, and strongly inrolled, extending well below the level of the strong anterior notch. Nine denticles occupy more than half the inner lip, strongest medially and very weak on the flare. The columella bears three very strong plications and one lira (occasionally up to four), together filling more than half of the aperture. An anterior callus is strong; a light callus wash extends to the posterior notch. The parietal callus ridge is strong; the parietal wall is deeply recessed with excavated plications. The aperture is straight and relatively narrow.

=== Animal ===
The foot is semi-transparent, about half again as long as the shell and proportionally narrower, with irregular yellowish-white lateral marks and two longer posterior streaks, interspersed with dull orange spots and black marks; a distinct elongated black mark lies medially at the posterior end. The bifid head lobes show greenish-yellow medial markings and semi-transparent tips; orange and black spots are present. Tentacles are short, semi-transparent, and unmarked; eyes black. The siphon is short and translucent yellowish-white. The mantle roof has a predominantly greenish-brown ground color with orange spots and larger round yellowish-white marks, many edged in black; the same chromatism is visible beneath the teleoconch whorls.

The features of the Gibberula Oriens that distinguish it from other Caribbean Gibberula consist of the distinct black mark on the posterior end of its foot and its unusually amorphous foot markings.

== Distribution ==
According to McCleary, the Gibberula Oriens is "an eastern Caribbean species known to range from off Cumana, Venezuela, through the Type locality, to off Islas Los Testigos and Tobago".
