= Olivella bullula =

Scientific classification
- Kingdom: Animalia
- Phylum: Mollusca
- Class: Gastropoda
- Subclass: Caenogastropoda
- Order: Neogastropoda
- Family: Olividae
- Genus: Olivella
- Species: O. bullula

Binomial name
- Olivella bullula (Reeve, 1850)

Species of gastropod

Olivella bullula is a species of small sea snail, marine gastropod mollusk in the subfamily Olivellinae, in the family Olividae, the olives. Species in the genus Olivella are commonly called dwarf olives.

== Description ==
"Shell acuminately oblong, thin, rather inflated, spire much exserted, columella arched, rather callous at the base; transparent-white, with a narrow opake zone beneath the sutures."

== Distribution ==
West Indies, Caribbean basin.
