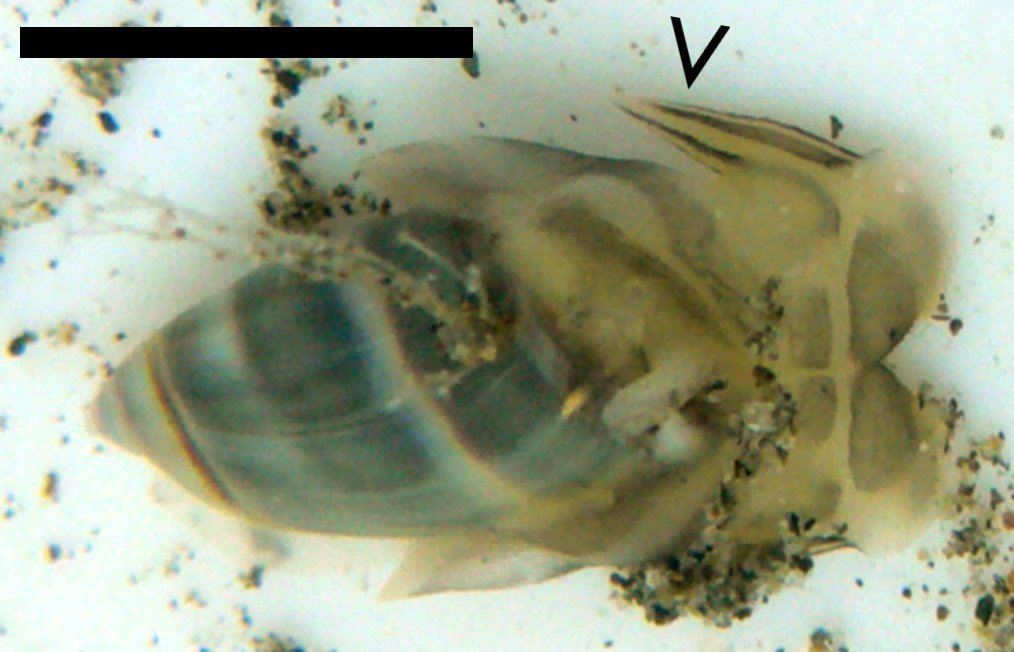
- Olivella columellaris crawling, scale bar: 1 cm. Arrowhead highlights lateral propodial appendage. From

Scientific classification
- Kingdom: Animalia
- Phylum: Mollusca
- Class: Gastropoda
- (unranked): clade Caenogastropoda clade Hypsogastropoda clade Neogastropoda
- Superfamily: Olivoidea
- Family: Olividae
- Subfamily: Olivellinae
- Genus: Olivella
- Subgenus: Pachyoliva Olsson, 1956

= Pachyoliva =

Subgenus of gastropods

Pachyoliva is a subgenus of small sea snails, marine gastropod mollusks in the genus Olivella, the dwarf olives, within the family Olividae, the olives. Species in this subgenus inhabit soft sediments in the intertidal (or eulittoral) and subtidal (or sublittoral) zones of sandy beaches of the Panamic faunal province, that is, the west coast of the Americas from Baja California to north Peru.

== Species ==
Species within this subgenus are:

- Olivella columellaris
- Olivella semistriata

== Life habits and ecology ==
The pachyolivas are of zoological interest for at least three reasons. First, on many beaches in their range, they are by far the most abundant macrofaunal element (= animal large enough to be easily seen), and therefore play a key role in the food web of their habitat. Second, they have evolved a unique way of filter feeding not found in any other snail, which enables them to exploit detritus floating in the backwash as a food source. Third, they utilize swash waves for locomotion by using their expanded foot as an underwater sail, a way of moving known as swash-surfing.
