= Siphonal canal =

Anatomical structure of certain sea snails

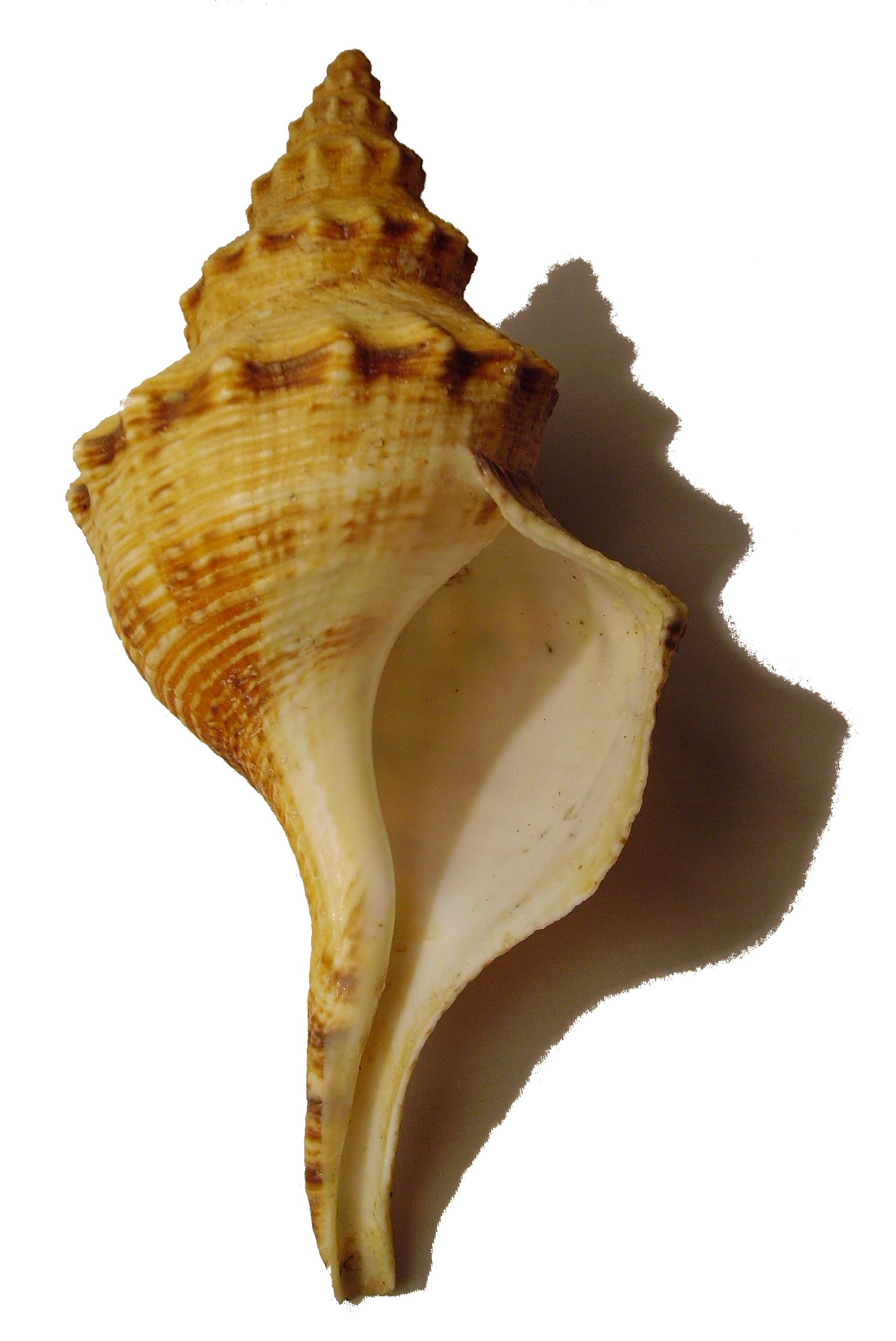
A shell of Penion cuvieranus cuvieranus, with the long siphonal canal visible extending toward the bottom of the image, at the anterior end of the shell.

The siphonal canal is an anatomical feature of the shells of certain groups of sea snails within the clade Neogastropoda. Some sea marine gastropods have a soft tubular anterior extension of the mantle called a siphon through which water is drawn into the mantle cavity and over the gill and which serves as a chemoreceptor to locate food. Siphonal canals allow for active transport of water to sensory organs inside the shell. Organisms without siphonal canals in their shells rely on passive or diffuse transport or water into their shell. Those with siphonal canals have a direct inhalant stream of water that interacts with sensory organs to detect concentration and direction of a stimulus, such as food or mates. In certain groups of carnivorous snails, where the siphon is particularly long, the structure of the shell has been modified in order to house and protect the soft structure of the siphon. Thus the siphonal canal is a semi-tubular extension of the aperture of the shell through which the siphon is extended when the animal is active.

== Morphology ==
The size and shape of the siphonal canal are important in taxonomic identification of mollusks. Sealed siphonal canals are a morphological feature of Muricidae subfamilies Ocenebrinae and Typhinae, a feature not found in other subfamilies from this taxonomic group. One gastropod whose shell has an exceptionally long siphonal canal is the Venus comb murex. Some gastropods have a simplified siphonal notch at the edge of the aperture instead of a canal. For example, high intertidal gastropods often have a very short siphonal canal or a greatly reduced siphonal notch.

There are close parallels between shell shape and presence of a siphonal canal. A study done by Vermeij found that shells that have a steep angle of their generating curve relative to their base axis (E) not do not have siphonal canals. Specifically, all shells examined with an E angle greater than 30% did not have siphonal canals, but shells with lower angles often did.

A short siphonal canal is preferred by some species of obligate commensal bivalves. Curvemysella paula is specially adapted to live inside snail shells occupied by hermit crabs. The crescent shaped shell of C. paula facilitates entry into the narrow space inside snail shells where they attach to the columellae and siphonal canal via byssal threads. The position and location of attachment anteriorly near the final whorls of the shell is an evolutionary behavior of adult individuals which prevents removal by the host.

== Evolution ==
Siphonal indentations have evolved multiple times in gastropods and are widespread among many clades. Euomphanilae gastropods in the genus Scalites developed siphons in the early Ordovician period (448–443 MYA); however, they are not observed in any other members of the clade. 22 of an estimated >23 instances of siphonal indentations evolved in Murchosinoniinae gastropods - the two major clades in this group are Vetigastropoda (1 siphonate group: Tylozone) and Apogastropoda. Apodastropoda contains Caenogastropoda (14 instances of siphon evolution) and Heterobranchia (3 instances of siphon evolution).

The evolution of siphonal indentations and related parts are not associated with species diversification and thus are likely not key innovations. Diversification is observed in only 17% of siphonate clades and primarily occurred during the Ordovician, late Paleozoic, and Mesozoic eras and was restricted to clades with few genera. Active predation only occurs in 1 siphonate clade (~4.5%) and is not considered a driver of evolution. Further, the evolution of the siphonal canal did not coincide with a change in feeding style as the basal ancestor was nonpredatory. One hypothesis is that the evolution of the siphonal canal was due to locomotion, because species without siphonal canals are largely sedentary, whereas siphonal families can move around the benthos. However, due to the widespread ecological contexts of gastropods with a siphonal canal, there is no consensus hypothesis or unified driver which can explain the evolution or loss of this structure.

The siphonal canal arose independently in the fossil record 23 times, and was subsequently lost 17 times. Secondary loss was associated with miniaturization, the adoption of a sessile lifestyle, and non-marine habits. A possible driver for these losses may have been species no longer relying on distance chemoreception, common in non-marine gastropods. During the Cretaceous and Cenozoic periods, some species evolved long or closed siphonal canals. This was the earliest instance of long canal and closed canal evolution, which subsequently arose approximately 15 times. Closed canals in particular helped prevent predation by armoring the gastropod. More generally, the siphonal canal protects gastropods by allowing their shells to be fully closed, with their mantle protected, while still sensing cues from the environment.

== See also ==
- Siphonal notch
- Stromboid notch
