= Cupidoliva solidula =

Scientific classification
- Kingdom: Animalia
- Phylum: Mollusca
- Class: Gastropoda
- Subclass: Caenogastropoda
- Order: Neogastropoda
- Family: Olividae
- Genus: Cupidoliva
- Species: C. solidula

Binomial name
- Cupidoliva solidula (Verco, 1909)

Species of gastropod

Cupidoliva solidula is a species of sea snail, a marine gastropod mollusc in the family Olividae, the olives.
