= Cupidoliva =

Scientific classification
- Kingdom: Animalia
- Phylum: Mollusca
- Class: Gastropoda
- Subclass: Caenogastropoda
- Order: Neogastropoda
- Family: Olividae
- Subfamily: Olivellinae
- Genus: Cupidoliva; Iredale, 1924

Genus of gastropods

Cupidoliva is a genus of sea snails, marine gastropod molluscs in the family Olividae.

== Species ==
Species within the genus Cupidoliva include:

- Cupidoliva adiorygma (Verco, 1909)
- Cupidoliva nympha (A. Adams & Angas, 1864)
- Cupidoliva solidula (Verco, 1909)
