= Siphonal notch =

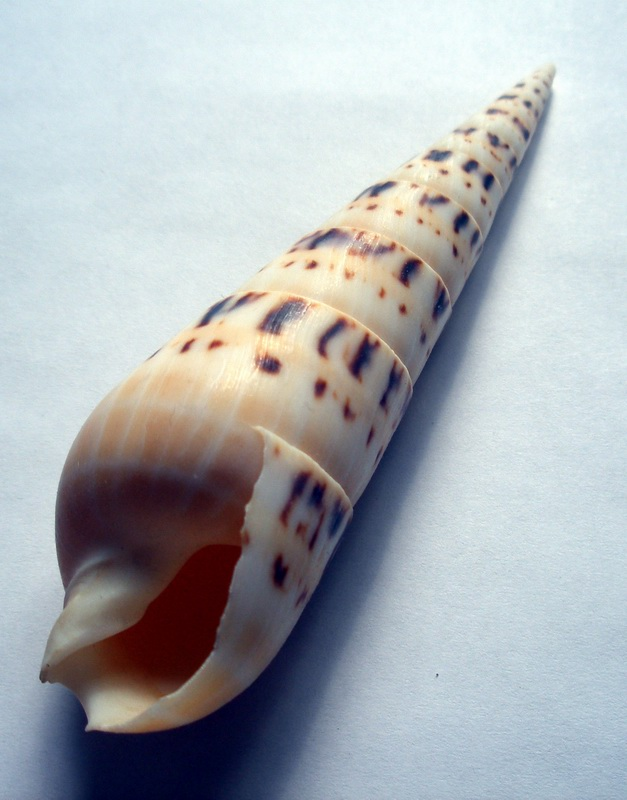
A shell of Acus crenulata, with the siphonal notch visible near the bottom left of the image, at the anterior end of the shell.

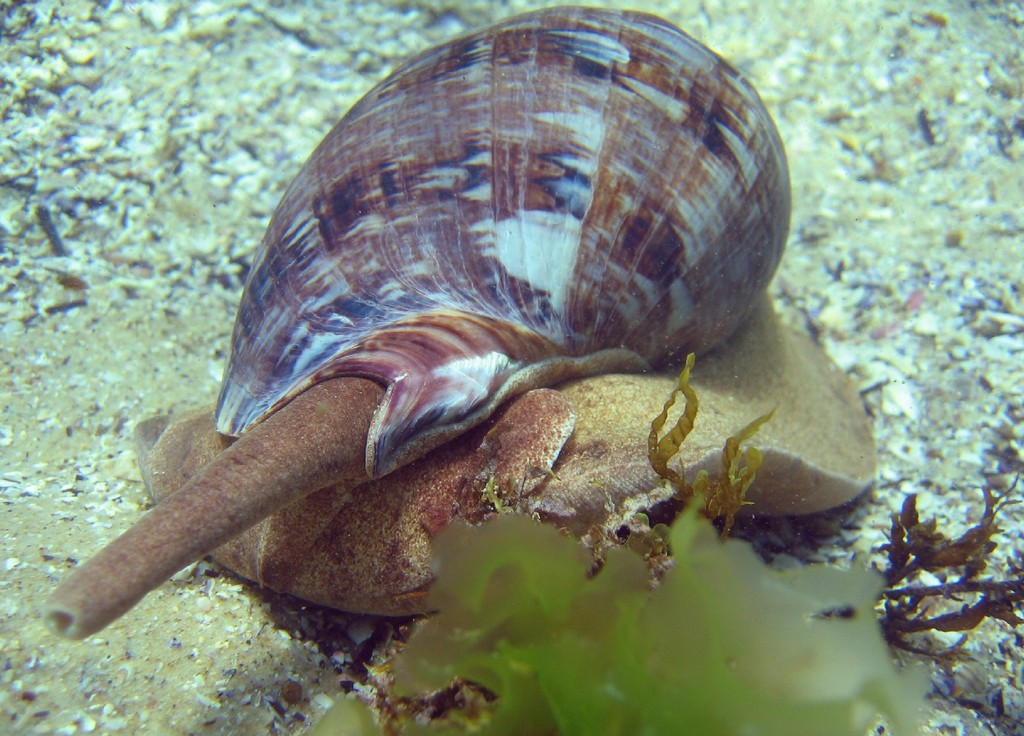
A live individual of the volute species Cymbiola magnifica showing the siphon extended through the siphonal notch of the shell

A siphonal notch is an indentation at the anterior end of the shell aperture in some sea snails (marine gastropod mollusks) through which the animal's siphon extends. Unlike a siphonal canal, a notch does not form a prolonged extension of the shell.

In these particular groups of sea snails the animal has a soft tubular anterior extension of the mantle called a siphon through which water is drawn into the mantle cavity and over the gill and which serves as a chemoreceptor to locate food. This siphonal opening also serves for the exit of the water that has entered by the branchial opening.

The siphonal notch is a noticeable notch situated at the most posterior part of the aperture of the shell, through which the siphon is extended when the animal is active. The notch at the posterior end of the aperture is also called the anal notch, anal sinus, anal canal or posterior canal.

Instead of a simple siphonal notch, some gastropods have an elongated siphonal canal, a hard shell tube which extends out from the anterior edge of the aperture.

== See also ==
- Siphonal canal
- Stromboid notch
