= Olivella =

- Municipality
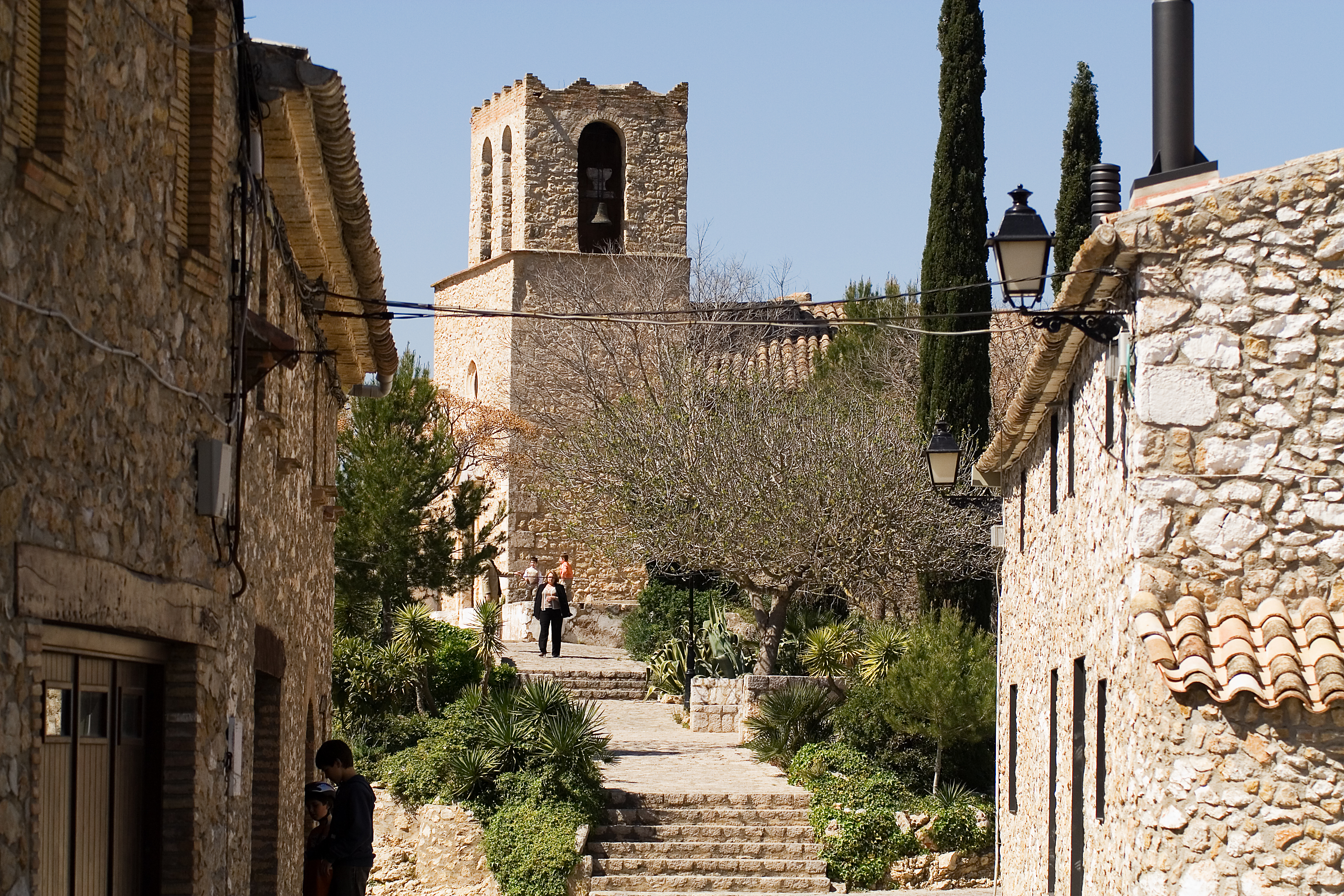
- Olivella and its church

- Coat of arms

- Location in Catalonia Olivella (Spain)
- Coordinates: 41°19′0″N 1°49′0″E
- Country: Spain
- Community: Catalonia
- Province: Barcelona
- Comarca: Garraf

Government
  - Mayor: Marta Verdejo Sánchez (2015)

Area
  - Total: 38.8 km^{2} (15.0 sq mi)
- Elevation: 211 m (692 ft)

Population (2025-01-01)
  - Total: 4,435
  - Density: 114/km^{2} (296/sq mi)
- Postal code: 08818
- Website: olivella.cat

Olivella (Catalan pronunciation: [uliˈβeʎə]) is a municipality in Catalonia, in the province of Barcelona, Spain. It is situated in the comarca of Garraf.

== History ==
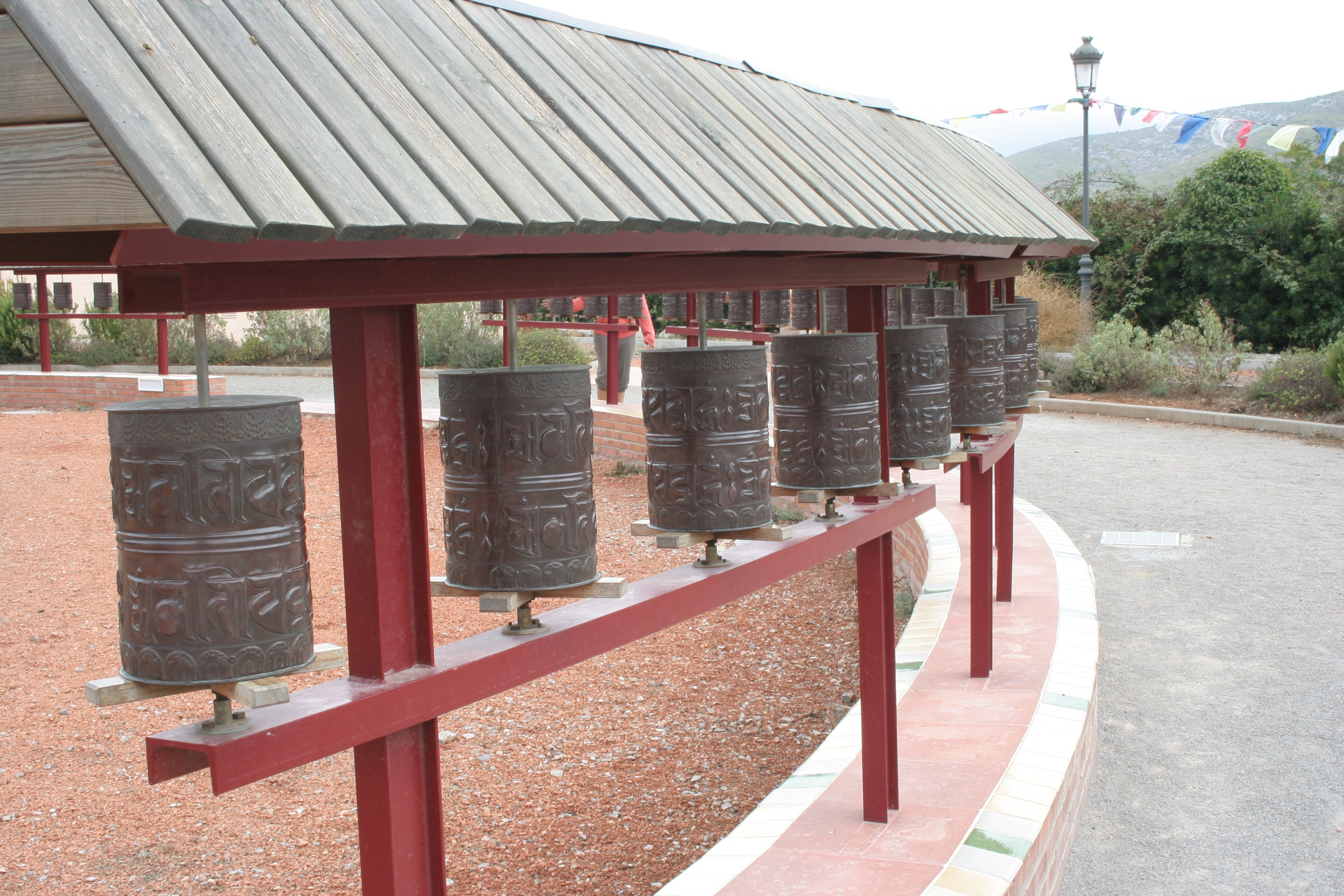
Buddhist monastery in Olivella

The first known village in the area was founded in 992 around a castle known as Castell vell. The inhabitants lived off dryland agriculture. This initial nucleus was almost abandoned after the black plague caused numerous deaths.

The area was resettled in the 14th century and gradually prospered. Nowadays there are some new housing developments in the area as well as the "Sakya Tashi Ling" Buddhist monastery, located in Plana Novella.

== Geography ==
The village is located in the Garraf Massif, in a natural park area, not far from Barcelona.
