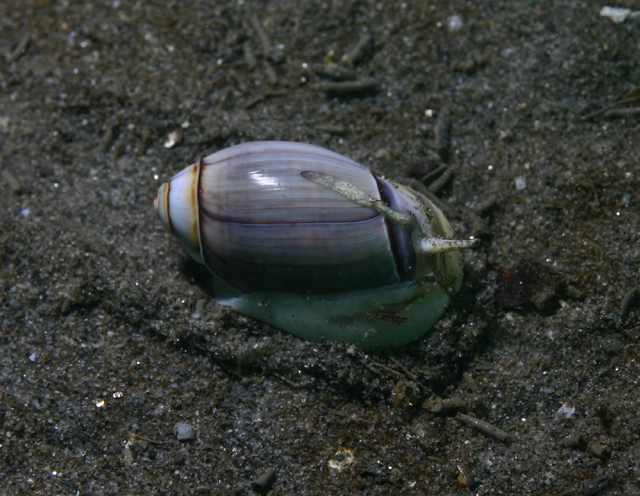
- Olivella biplicata

Scientific classification
- Kingdom: Animalia
- Phylum: Mollusca
- Class: Gastropoda
- Subclass: Caenogastropoda
- Order: Neogastropoda
- Family: Olividae
- Subfamily: Olivellinae; Troschel, 1869

Genera
- See text.

= Olivellinae =

Subfamily of gastropods

Olivellinae, are a subfamily of small predatory sea snails with smooth, shiny, elongated oval-shaped shells, in the family Olividae. The shells sometimes show muted but attractive colors, and may have some patterning.

These animals are marine gastropod molluscs in the superfamily Olivoidea, within the order Neogastropoda according to the taxonomy of Bouchet and Rocroi.

== Distribution ==
Olivella snails are found worldwide, but mostly Ecuador in subtropical and tropical seas and oceans.

== Habitat and habit ==
These snails are found on sandy substrates intertidally and subtidally. These snails are all carnivorous sand-burrowers.

== Shell description ==
The shells are basically oval and cylindrical in shape. They have a well-developed stepped spire. Olivella shells have a siphonal notch at the posterior end of the long narrow aperture. The siphon of the living animal protrudes from the siphon notch.

The shell surface is extremely glossy because in life the mantle almost always covers the shell.

== The fossil record ==
Olive shells first appeared during the Campanian.

== Genera ==
- Callianax H. Adams & A. Adams, 1853
- Cupidoliva Iredale, 1924
- Olivella Swainson, 1831

Genera brought into synonymy

- Dactylidia H. Adams & A. Adams, 1853: synonym of Olivella Swainson, 1831
- Olivina d'Orbigny, 1841: synonym of Olivella Swainson, 1831
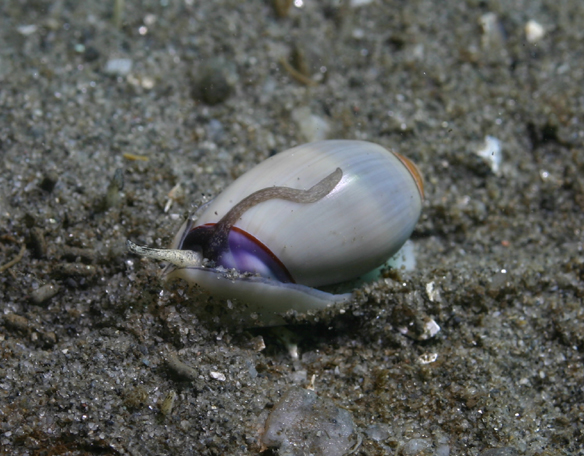
Olivella biplicata

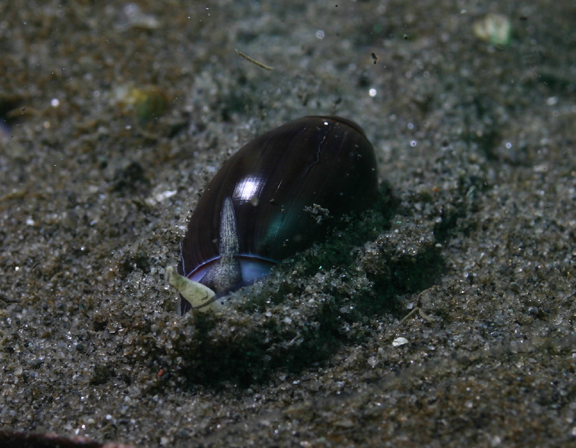
Olivella biplicata
