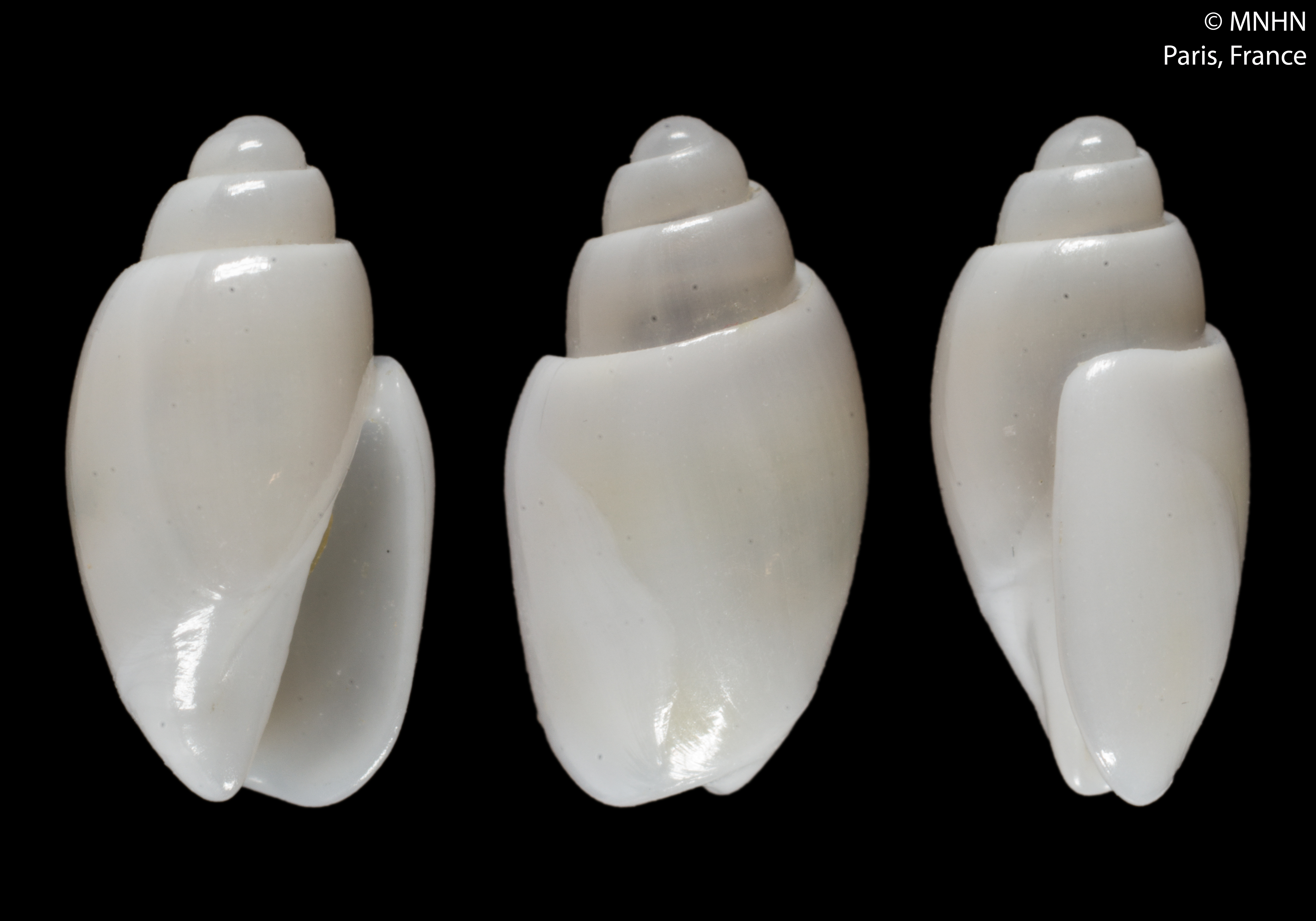
- Shell of Belloliva apoma (holotype at MNHN, Paris)

Scientific classification
- Kingdom: Animalia
- Phylum: Mollusca
- Class: Gastropoda
- Subclass: Caenogastropoda
- Order: Neogastropoda
- Superfamily: Olivoidea
- Family: Bellolividae
- Genus: Belloliva
- Species: B. apoma

Binomial name
- Belloliva apoma Kantor & Bouchet, 2007

= Belloliva apoma =

Species of gastropod

Belloliva apoma is a species of sea snail, a marine gastropod mollusc in the family Bellolividae, the olives.

== Description ==
The length of the shell attains 6 mm.

== Distribution ==
This marine species occurs off New Caledonia.
