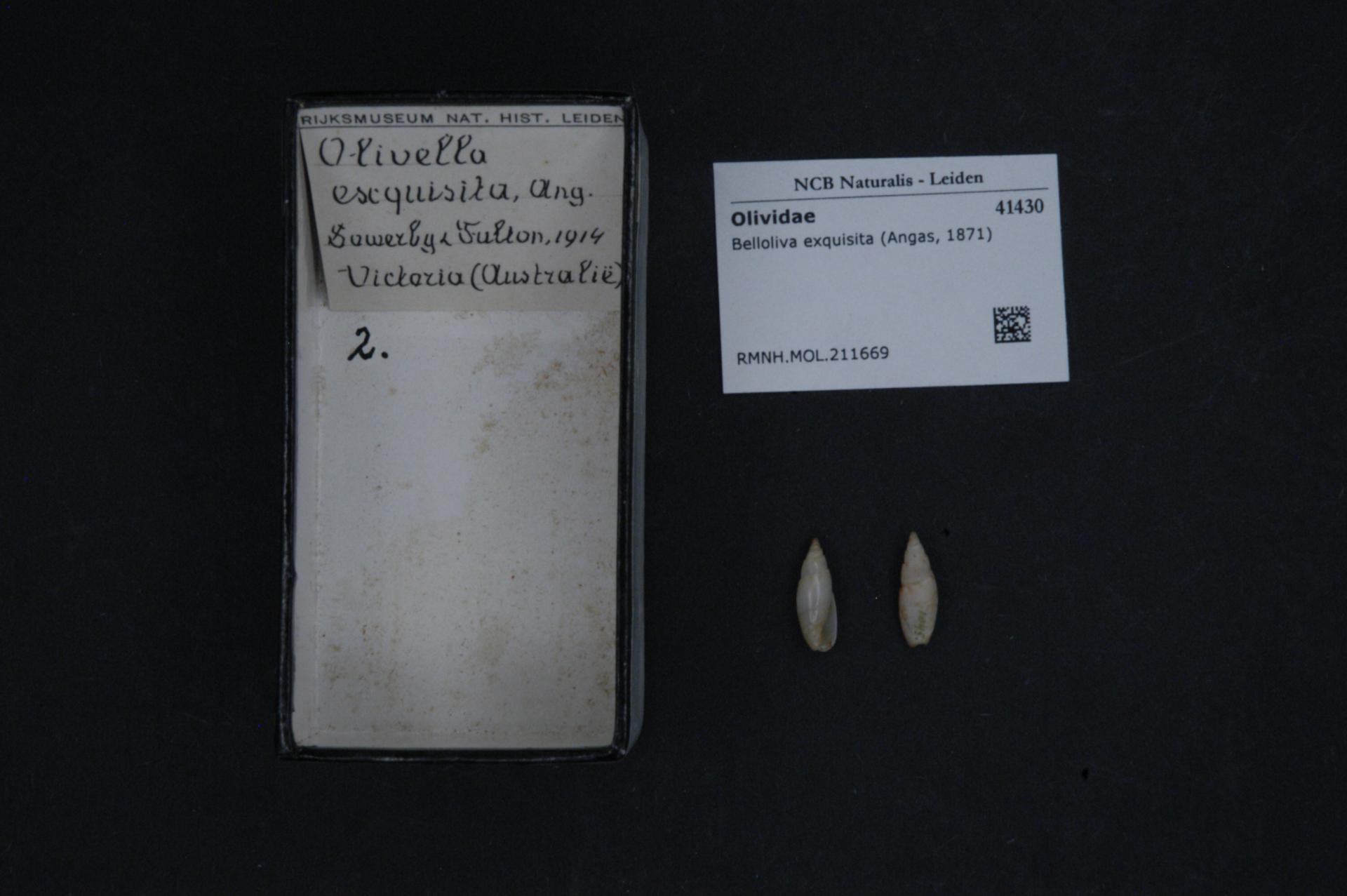
- Belloliva exquisita

Scientific classification
- Kingdom: Animalia
- Phylum: Mollusca
- Class: Gastropoda
- Subclass: Caenogastropoda
- Order: Neogastropoda
- Superfamily: Olivoidea
- Family: Bellolividae
- Genus: Belloliva; Peile, 1922

Type species
- Olivella simplex Pease, 1868

Synonyms
- Belloliva (Gemmoliva) Iredale, 1924

= Belloliva =

Genus of gastropods

Belloliva is a genus of sea snails, marine gastropod mollusks in the family Bellolividae.

== Species ==
As of October 2018, the following species are accepted:

- Belloliva alaos Kantor & Bouchet, 2007
- Belloliva apoma Kantor & Bouchet, 2007
- †Belloliva canaliculata Darragh, 2017
- Belloliva dorcas Kantor & Bouchet, 2007
- Belloliva ellenae Kantor & Bouchet, 2007
- Belloliva exquisita (Angas, 1871)
- Belloliva iota Kantor & Bouchet, 2007
- Belloliva leucozona (A. Adams & Angas, 1864)
- Belloliva obeon Kantor & Bouchet, 2007
- Belloliva triticea (Duclos, 1835)
- Belloliva tubulata (Dall, 1889)

Species brought into synonymy

- Belloliva brazieri (Angas, 1877): synonym of Belloliva leucozona (A. Adams & Angas, 1864)
- Belloliva simplex (Pease, 1868): synonym of Janaoliva simplex (Pease, 1868) accepted as Olivellopsis simplex (Pease, 1868)
