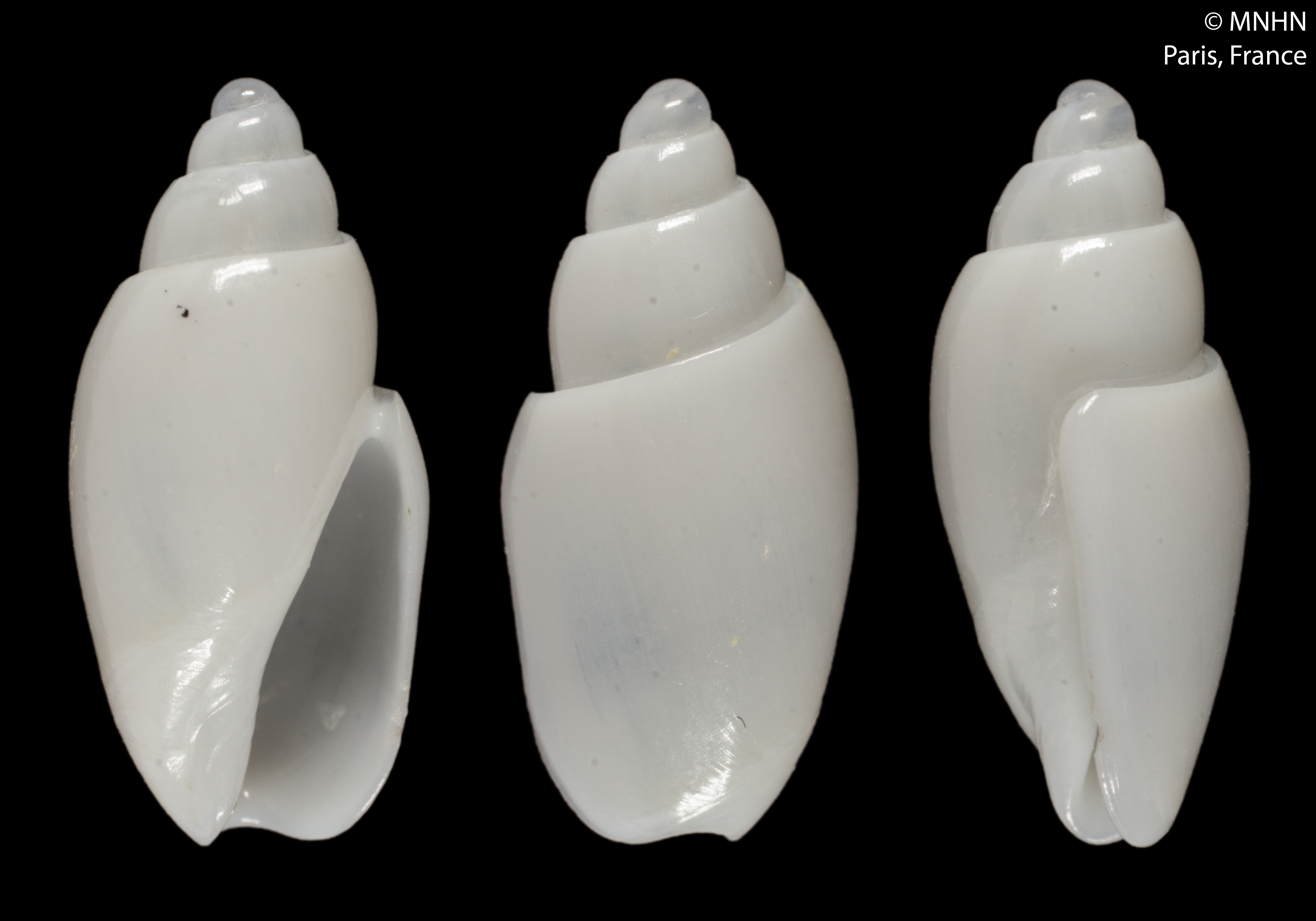
- Shell of Belloliva alaos (holotype at MNHN, Paris)

Scientific classification
- Kingdom: Animalia
- Phylum: Mollusca
- Class: Gastropoda
- Subclass: Caenogastropoda
- Order: Neogastropoda
- Superfamily: Olivoidea
- Family: Bellolividae
- Genus: Belloliva
- Species: B. alaos

Binomial name
- Belloliva alaos Kantor & Bouchet, 2007

= Belloliva alaos =

Species of gastropod

Belloliva alaos is a species of sea snail, a marine gastropod mollusc in the family Bellolividae, the olives.
