= Fusulculus albus =

Scientific classification
- Kingdom: Animalia
- Phylum: Mollusca
- Class: Gastropoda
- Subclass: Caenogastropoda
- Order: Neogastropoda
- Family: Benthobiidae
- Genus: Fusulculus
- Species: F. albus

Binomial name
- Fusulculus albus Bouchet & Vermeij, 1998

Species of gastropod

Fusulculus albus is a species of sea snail, a marine gastropod mollusc in the family Benthobiidae.

== Description ==
The length of the shell attains 7.9 mm.

== Distribution ==
This marine species occurs off New Caledonia.
