= Jaspidella carminiae =

Scientific classification
- Kingdom: Animalia
- Phylum: Mollusca
- Class: Gastropoda
- Subclass: Caenogastropoda
- Order: Neogastropoda
- Family: Bellolividae
- Genus: Jaspidella
- Species: J. carminiae

Binomial name
- Jaspidella carminiae Petuch, 1992

Species of gastropod

Jaspidella carminiae is a species of sea snail, a marine gastropod mollusk in the family Olividae, the olives.

== Description ==
Shell size 15 mm.

== Distribution ==
Type locality of the species is the Los Roques Archipelago of Venezuela, Caribbean Sea. The species also occurs at St. Vincent, and at Martinique.
