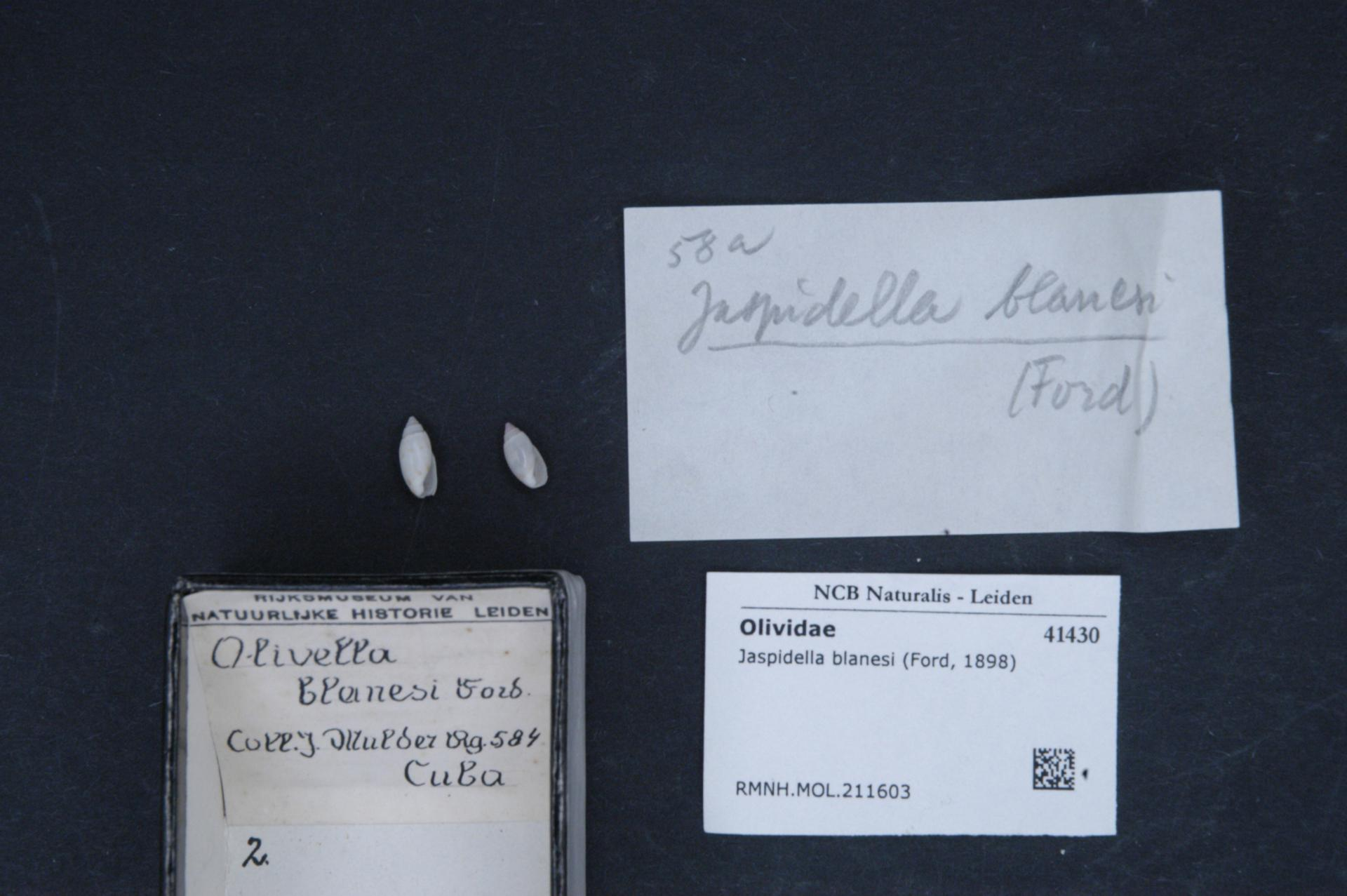
- Jaspidella blanesi

Scientific classification
- Kingdom: Animalia
- Phylum: Mollusca
- Class: Gastropoda
- Subclass: Caenogastropoda
- Order: Neogastropoda
- Family: Bellolividae
- Genus: Jaspidella
- Species: J. blanesi

Binomial name
- Jaspidella blanesi (Ford, 1898)

= Jaspidella blanesi =

Species of gastropod

Jaspidella blanesi is a species of sea snail, a marine gastropod mollusk in the family Olividae, the olives.
