= Belloliva tubulata =

Scientific classification
- Kingdom: Animalia
- Phylum: Mollusca
- Class: Gastropoda
- Subclass: Caenogastropoda
- Order: Neogastropoda
- Family: Bellolividae
- Genus: Belloliva
- Species: B. tubulata

Binomial name
- Belloliva tubulata (Dall, 1889)

Species of gastropod

Belloliva tubulata is a species of sea snail, a marine gastropod mollusc in the family Bellolividae, the olives.
