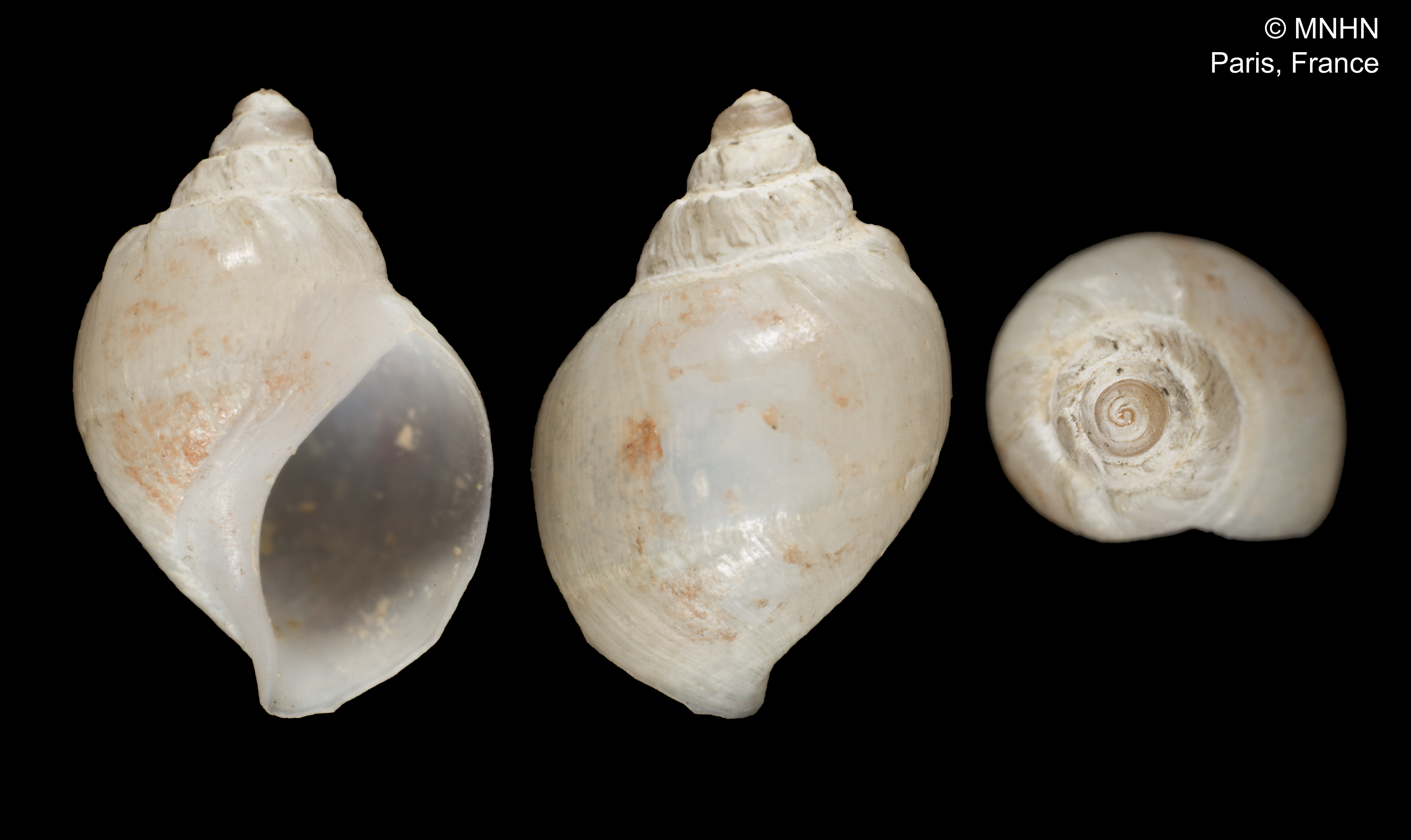
- Shell of Benthobia tryonii (syntype at MNHN, Paris)

Scientific classification
- Kingdom: Animalia
- Phylum: Mollusca
- Class: Gastropoda
- Subclass: Caenogastropoda
- Order: Neogastropoda
- Family: Benthobiidae
- Genus: Benthobia
- Species: B. tryonii

Binomial name
- Benthobia tryonii Dall, 1889

Synonyms
- Lacuna cossmanni Locard, 1897; Nux alabaster Barnard, 1960

= Benthobia tryonii =

Species of gastropod

Benthobia tryonii is a species of sea snail, a marine gastropod mollusc in the family Benthobiidae.

== Distribution ==
This species occurs in the Atlantic Ocean off the Sahara.
