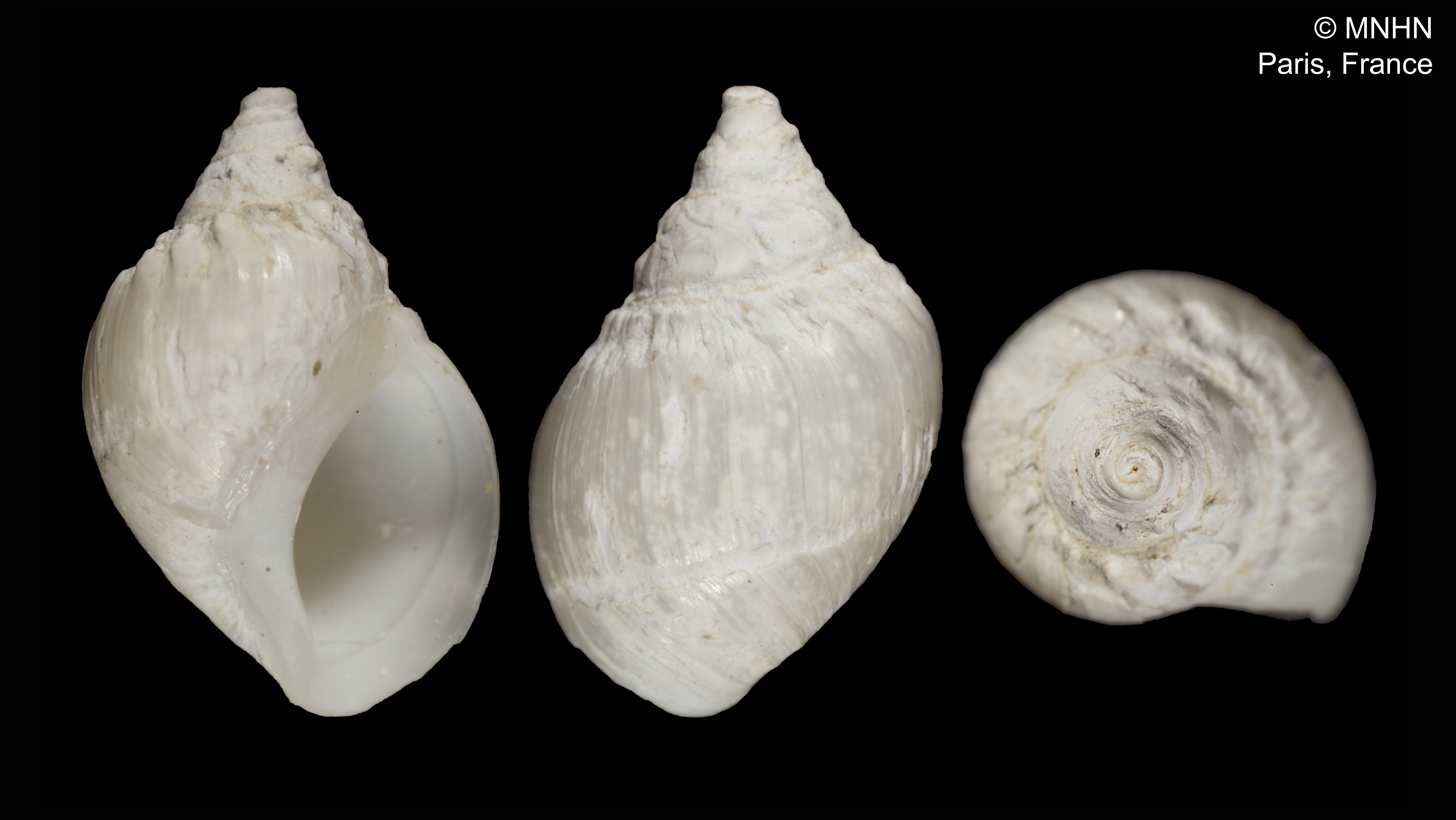
- Shell of Benthobia atafona (paratype at MNHN, Paris)

Scientific classification
- Kingdom: Animalia
- Phylum: Mollusca
- Class: Gastropoda
- Subclass: Caenogastropoda
- Order: Neogastropoda
- Family: Benthobiidae
- Genus: Benthobia
- Species: B. atafona

Binomial name
- Benthobia atafona Simone, 2003

= Benthobia atafona =

Species of gastropod

Benthobia atafona is a species of sea snail, a marine gastropod mollusc in the family Benthobiidae.

== Distribution ==
This species occurs in the Atlantic Ocean off Southeast Brazil.
