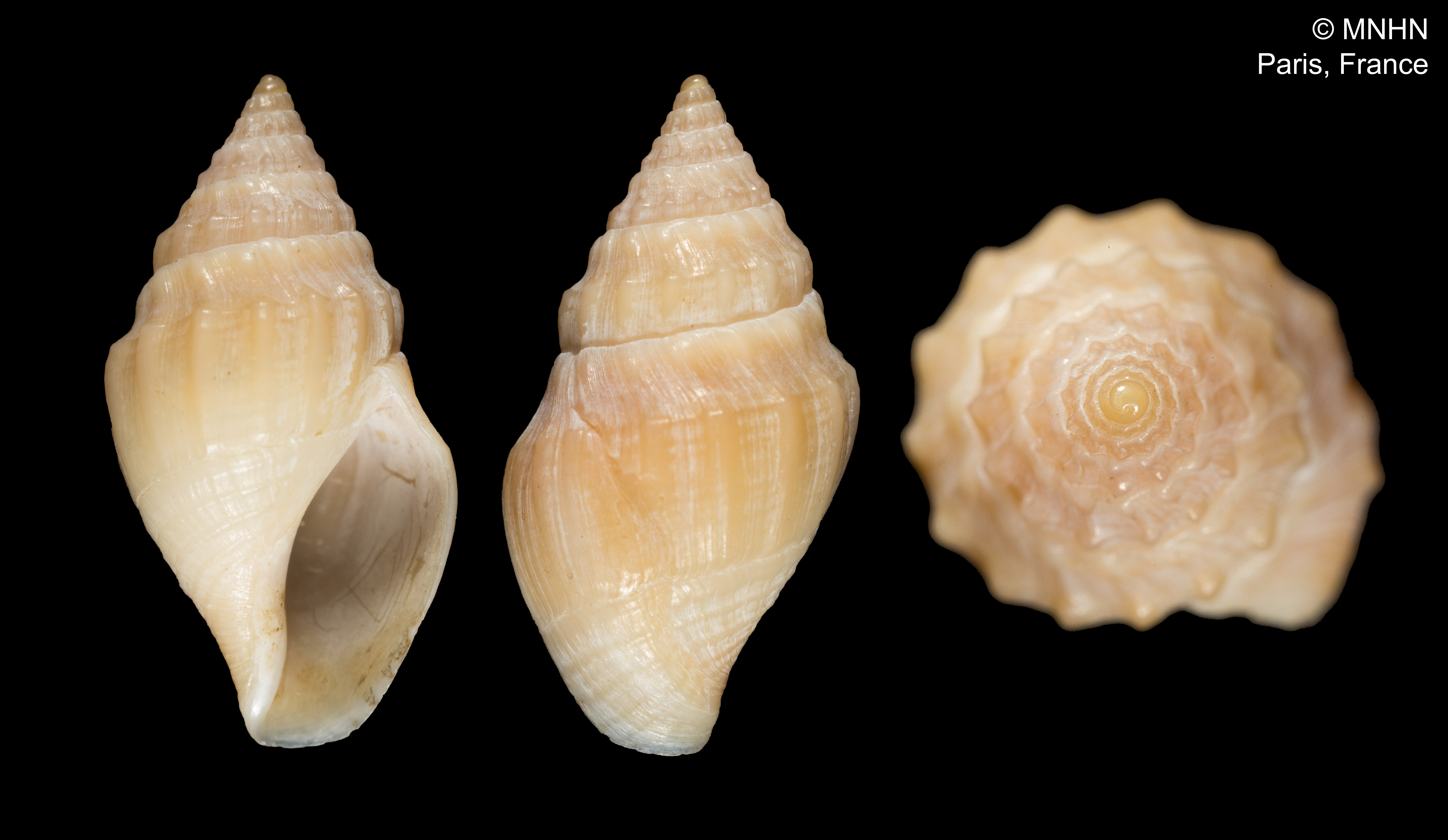
- Shell of Fusulculus crenatus (holotype at MNHN, Paris)

Scientific classification
- Kingdom: Animalia
- Phylum: Mollusca
- Class: Gastropoda
- Subclass: Caenogastropoda
- Order: Neogastropoda
- Family: Benthobiidae
- Genus: Fusulculus
- Species: F. crenatus

Binomial name
- Fusulculus crenatus Bouchet & Vermeij, 1998

= Fusulculus crenatus =

Species of gastropod

Fusulculus crenatus is a species of sea snail, a marine gastropod mollusc in the family Benthobiidae.

== Description ==
The length of the shell attains 16.4 mm.

== Distribution ==
This marine species occurs off the New Hebrides.
