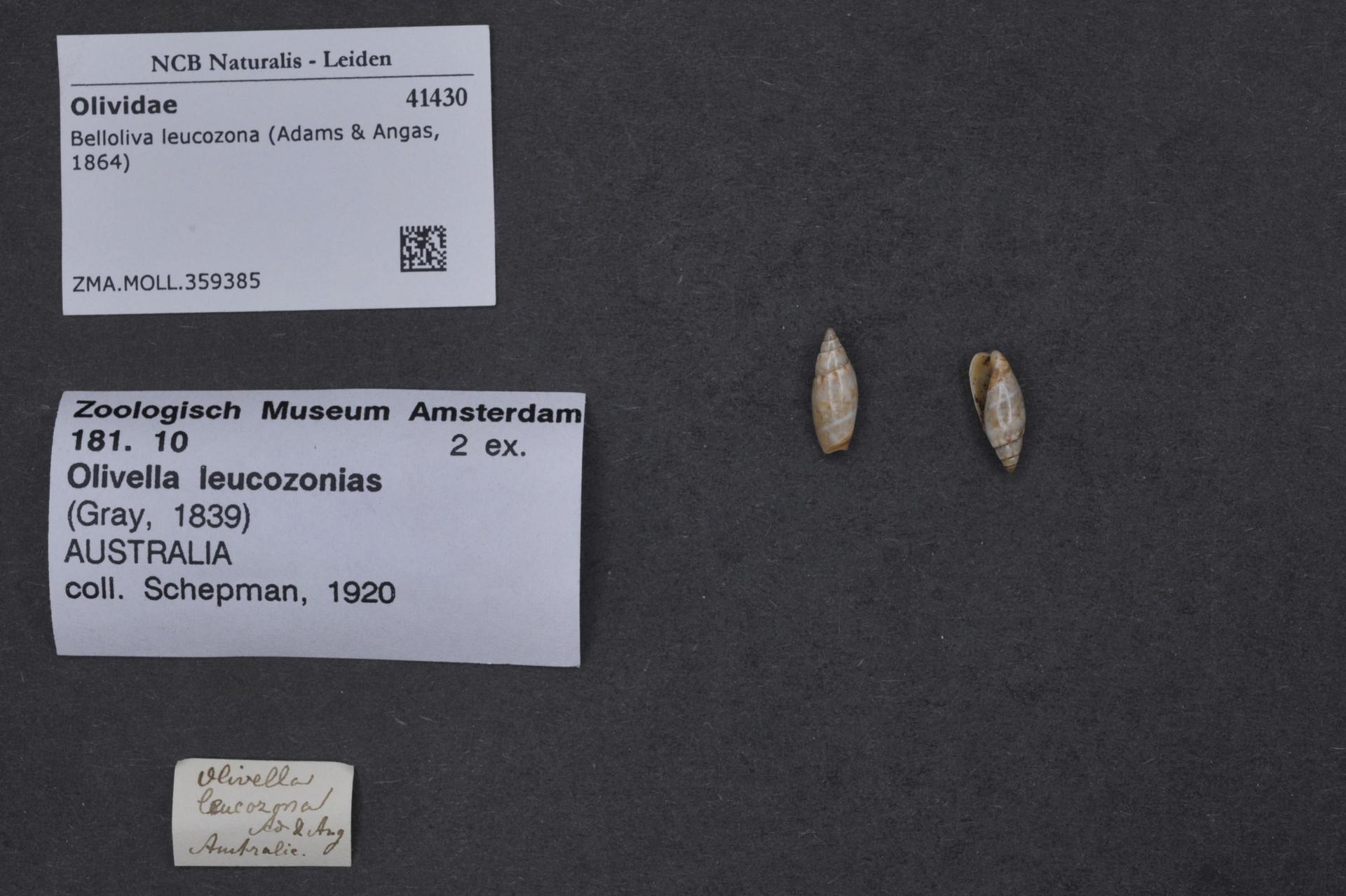

Scientific classification
- Kingdom: Animalia
- Phylum: Mollusca
- Class: Gastropoda
- Subclass: Caenogastropoda
- Order: Neogastropoda
- Family: Bellolividae
- Genus: Belloliva
- Species: B. leucozona

Binomial name
- Belloliva leucozona (A. Adams & Angas, 1864)

= Belloliva leucozona =

Species of gastropod

Belloliva leucozona is a species of sea snail, a marine gastropod mollusc in the family Bellolividae, the olives.
