= Benthobia complexirhyna =

Scientific classification
- Kingdom: Animalia
- Phylum: Mollusca
- Class: Gastropoda
- Subclass: Caenogastropoda
- Order: Neogastropoda
- Family: Benthobiidae
- Genus: Benthobia
- Species: B. complexirhyna

Binomial name
- Benthobia complexirhyna Simone, 2003

Species of gastropod

Benthobia complexirhyna is a species of sea snail, a marine gastropod mollusc in the family Benthobiidae.
