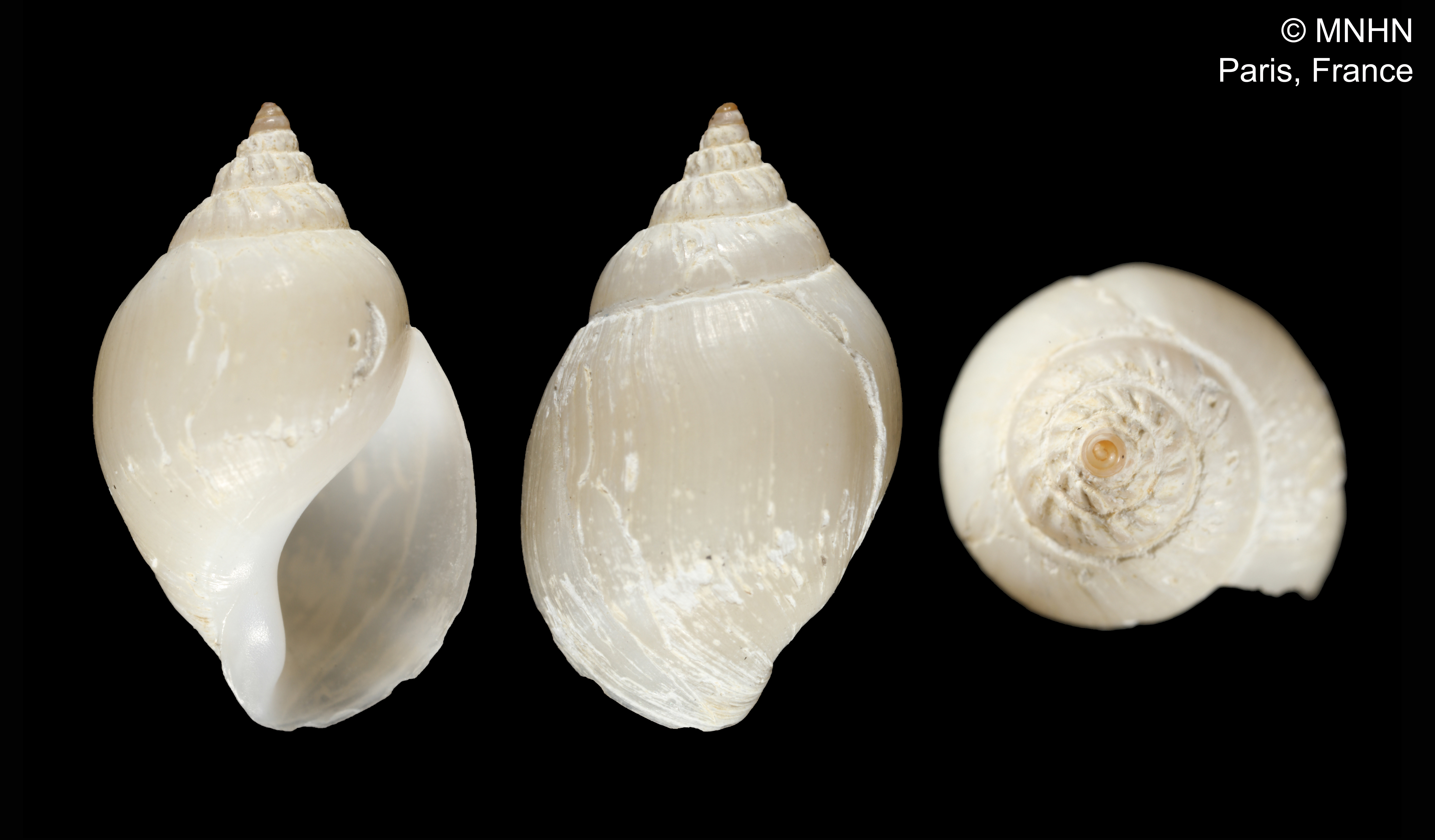
- Shell of Benthobia tornatilis (holotype at MNHN, Paris)

Scientific classification
- Kingdom: Animalia
- Phylum: Mollusca
- Class: Gastropoda
- Subclass: Caenogastropoda
- Order: Neogastropoda
- Family: Benthobiidae
- Genus: Benthobia
- Species: B. tornatilis

Binomial name
- Benthobia tornatilis Simone, 2003

= Benthobia tornatilis =

Species of gastropod

Benthobia tornatilis is a species of sea snail, a marine gastropod mollusc in the family Benthobiidae.

== Distribution ==
This marine species occurs on the Lord Howe Rise in the Coral Sea.
