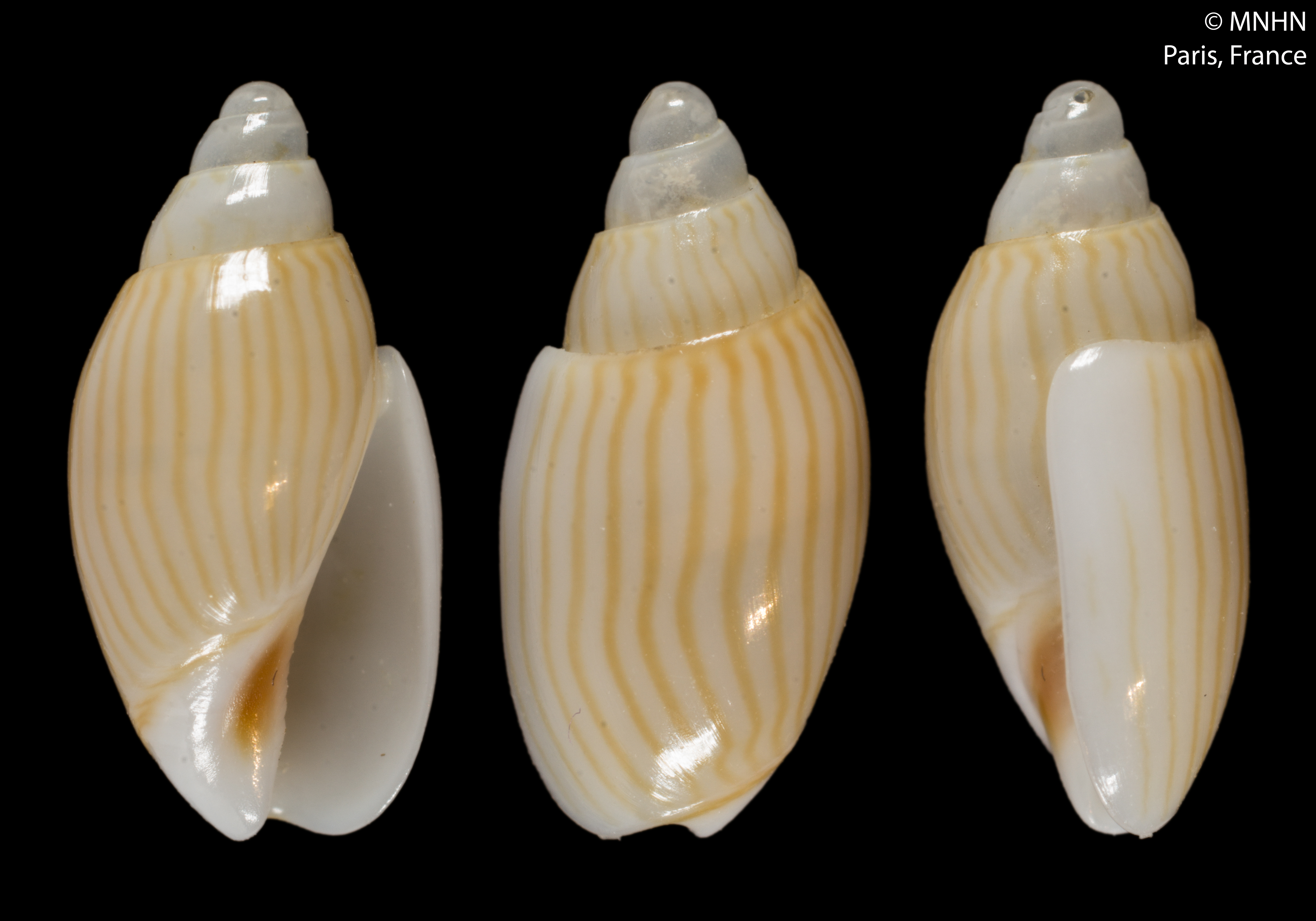
- Shell of Belloliva ellenae (holotype at MNHN, Paris)

Scientific classification
- Kingdom: Animalia
- Phylum: Mollusca
- Class: Gastropoda
- Subclass: Caenogastropoda
- Order: Neogastropoda
- Family: Bellolividae
- Genus: Belloliva
- Species: B. ellenae

Binomial name
- Belloliva ellenae Kantor & Bouchet, 2007

= Belloliva ellenae =

Species of gastropod

Belloliva ellenae is a species of sea snail, a marine gastropod mollusc in the family Bellolividae, the olives and the like.
