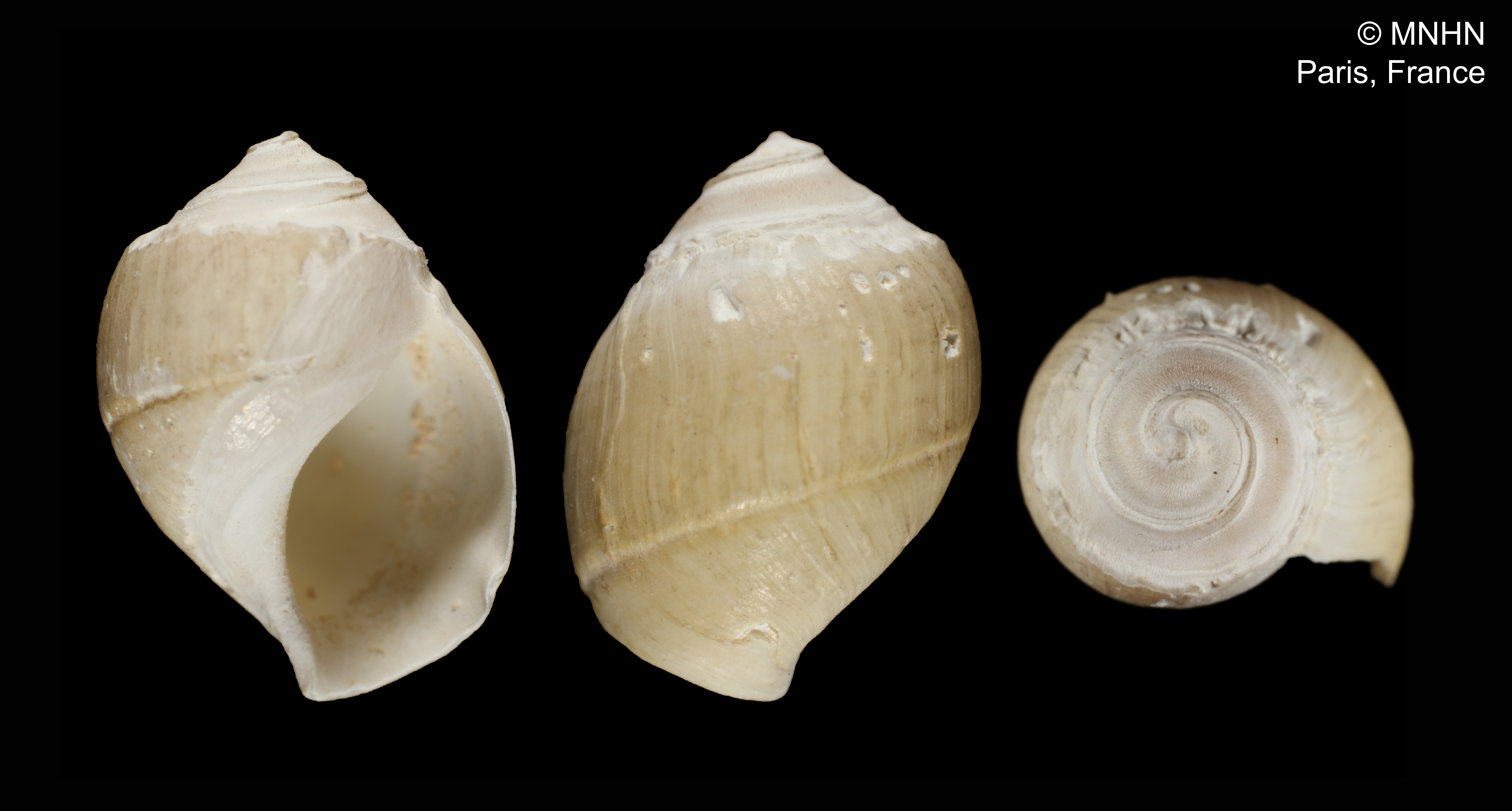
- Shell of Benthobia sima (holotype at MNHN, Paris)

Scientific classification
- Kingdom: Animalia
- Phylum: Mollusca
- Class: Gastropoda
- Subclass: Caenogastropoda
- Order: Neogastropoda
- Family: Benthobiidae
- Genus: Benthobia
- Species: B. sima

Binomial name
- Benthobia sima Simone, 2003

= Benthobia sima =

Species of gastropod

Benthobia sima is a species of sea snail, a marine gastropod mollusc in the family Benthobiidae.

== Distribution ==
This marine species occurs in the Mozambique Channel.
