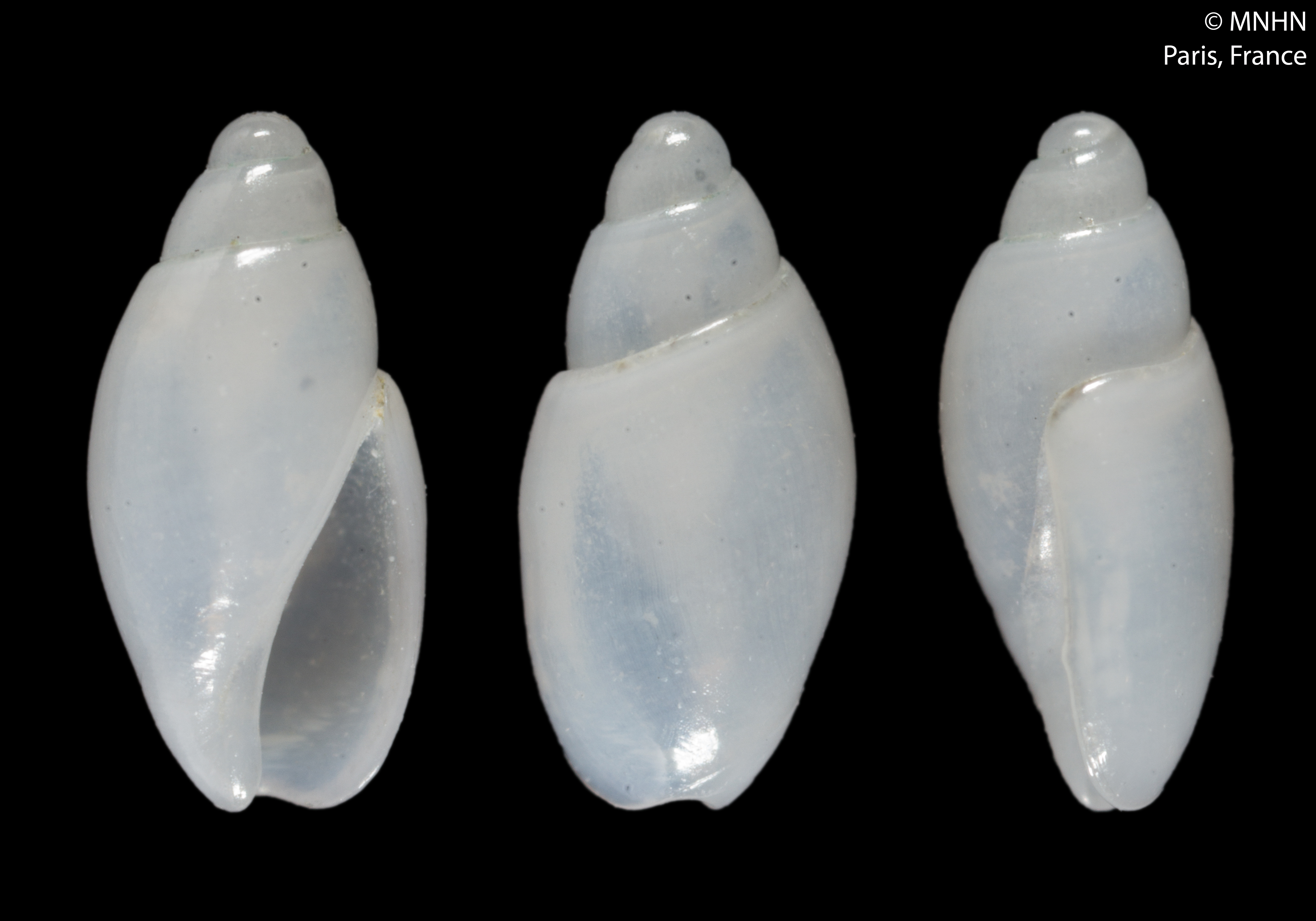
- Shell of Olivellopsis amoni (holotype at MNHN, Paris)

Scientific classification
- Kingdom: Animalia
- Phylum: Mollusca
- Class: Gastropoda
- Subclass: Caenogastropoda
- Order: Neogastropoda
- Superfamily: Olivoidea
- Family: Bellolividae
- Genus: Olivellopsis; Thiele, 1929

Type species
- Olivella simplex Pease, 1868

Synonyms
- Janaoliva Sterba & Lorenz, 2005; Olivella (Janaoliva) Sterba & Lorenz, 2005

= Olivellopsis =

Genus of gastropods

Olivellopsis is a genus of sea snails, marine gastropod mollusks in the family Bellolividae.

== Species ==
- Olivellopsis amoni (Sterba & Lorenz, 2005)
- Olivellopsis simplex (Pease, 1868)
