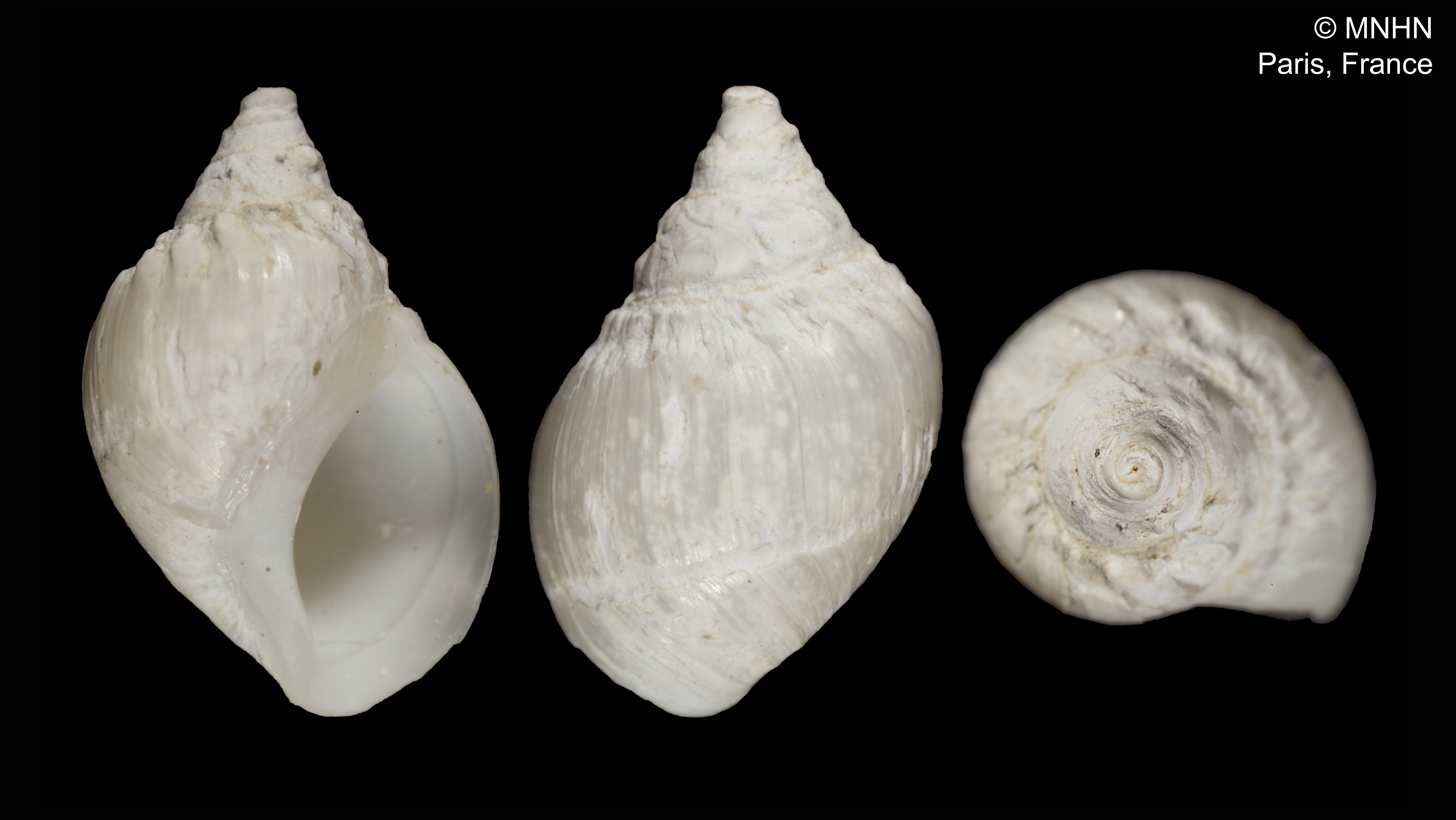
- Benthobia atafona

Scientific classification
- Kingdom: Animalia
- Phylum: Mollusca
- Class: Gastropoda
- Subclass: Caenogastropoda
- Order: Neogastropoda
- Superfamily: Olivoidea
- Family: Benthobiidae
- Genus: Benthobia; Dall, 1889

Type species
- Benthobia tryonii Dall, 1889

Species
- See text

Synonyms
- Nux Barnard, 1960

= Benthobia =

Genus of gastropods

Benthobia is a genus of sea snails, marine gastropod mollusks in the family Benthobiidae.

== Species ==
Species within the genus Benthobia include:

- Benthobia atafona Simone, 2003
- Benthobia complexirhyna Simone, 2003
- Benthobia sima Simone, 2003
- Benthobia tornatilis Simone, 2003
- Benthobia tryonii Dall, 1889
