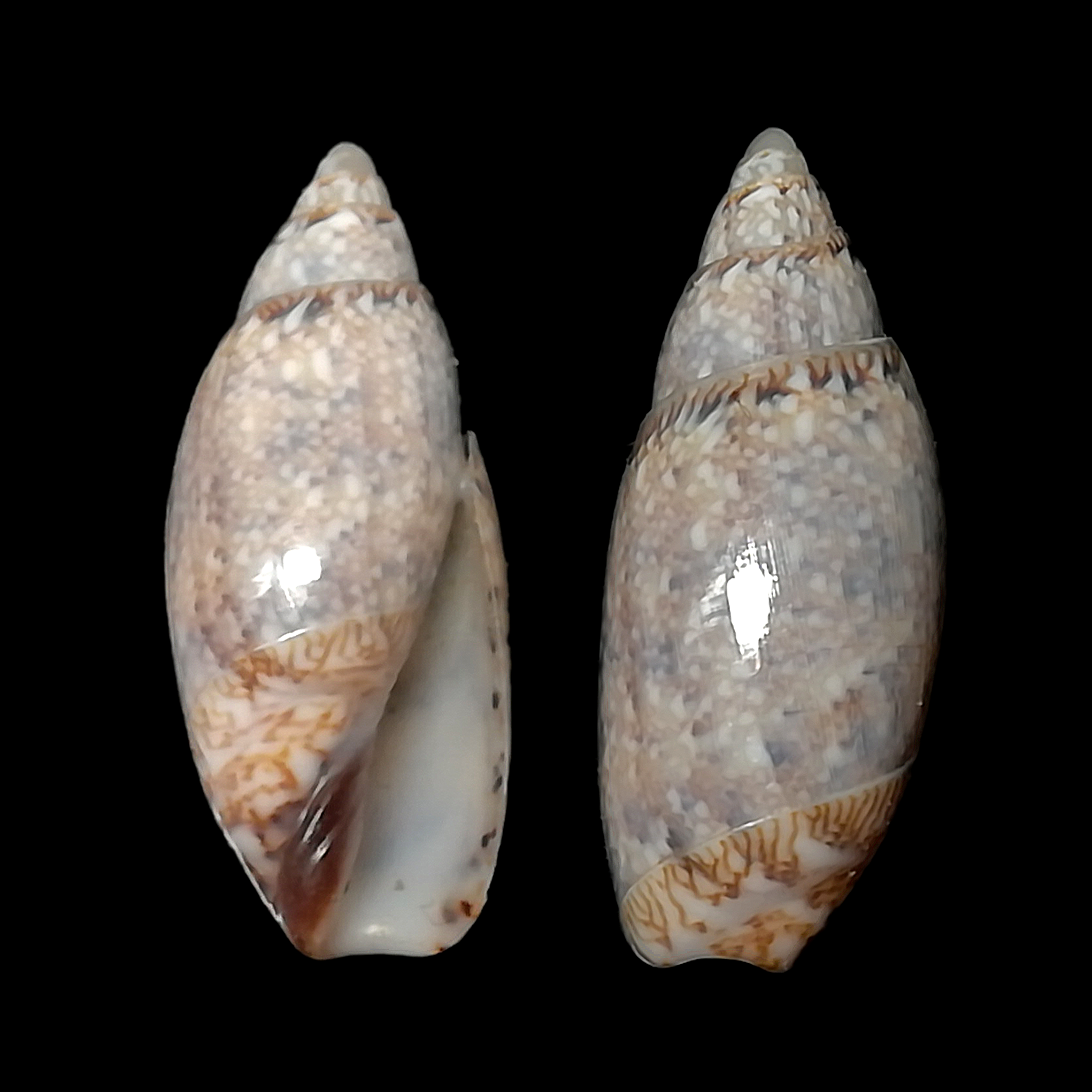
- Jaspidella jaspidea

Scientific classification
- Kingdom: Animalia
- Phylum: Mollusca
- Class: Gastropoda
- Subclass: Caenogastropoda
- Order: Neogastropoda
- Family: Bellolividae
- Genus: Jaspidella
- Species: J. jaspidea

Binomial name
- Jaspidella jaspidea (Gmelin, 1791)

Synonyms
- Oliva conoidalis Lamarck, 1811; Oliva exigua Mörch, 1852; Oliva mygdonia Duclos, 1844; Oliva piperata Marrat, 1867; Olivella jaspidea (Gmelin, 1791); Voluta jaspidea Gmelin, 1791 (original combination)

= Jaspidella jaspidea =

Species of gastropod

Jaspidella jaspidea is a species of sea snail, a marine gastropod mollusk in the family Bellolividae, the olives.

== Distribution ==
This species occurs in the Caribbean Sea, the Gulf of Mexico and the Lesser Antilles.
