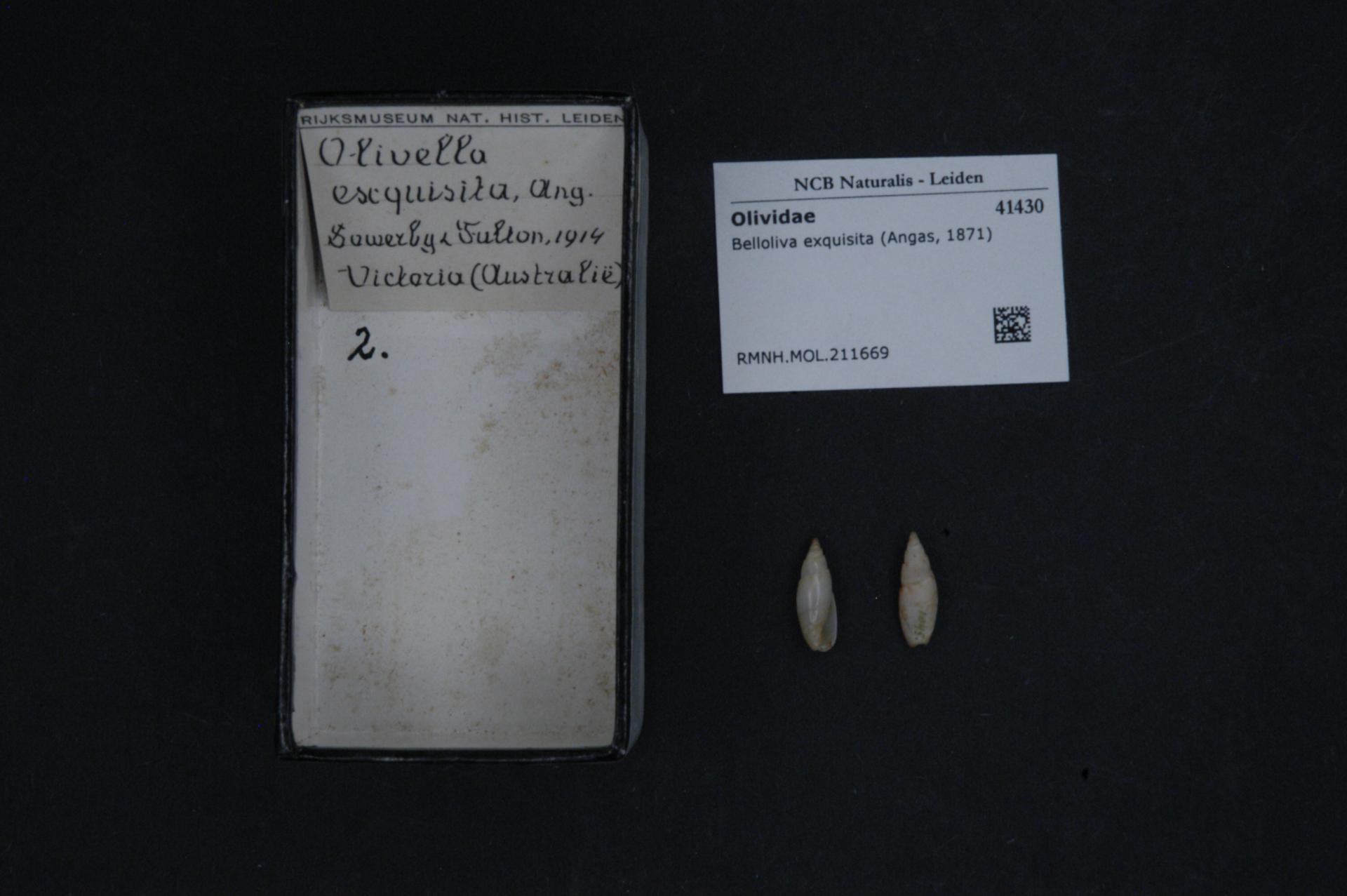

Scientific classification
- Kingdom: Animalia
- Phylum: Mollusca
- Class: Gastropoda
- Subclass: Caenogastropoda
- Order: Neogastropoda
- Family: Bellolividae
- Genus: Belloliva
- Species: B. exquisita

Binomial name
- Belloliva exquisita (Angas, 1871)

= Belloliva exquisita =

Species of gastropod

Belloliva exquisita is a species of sea snail, a marine gastropod mollusc in the family Bellolividae, the olives.
