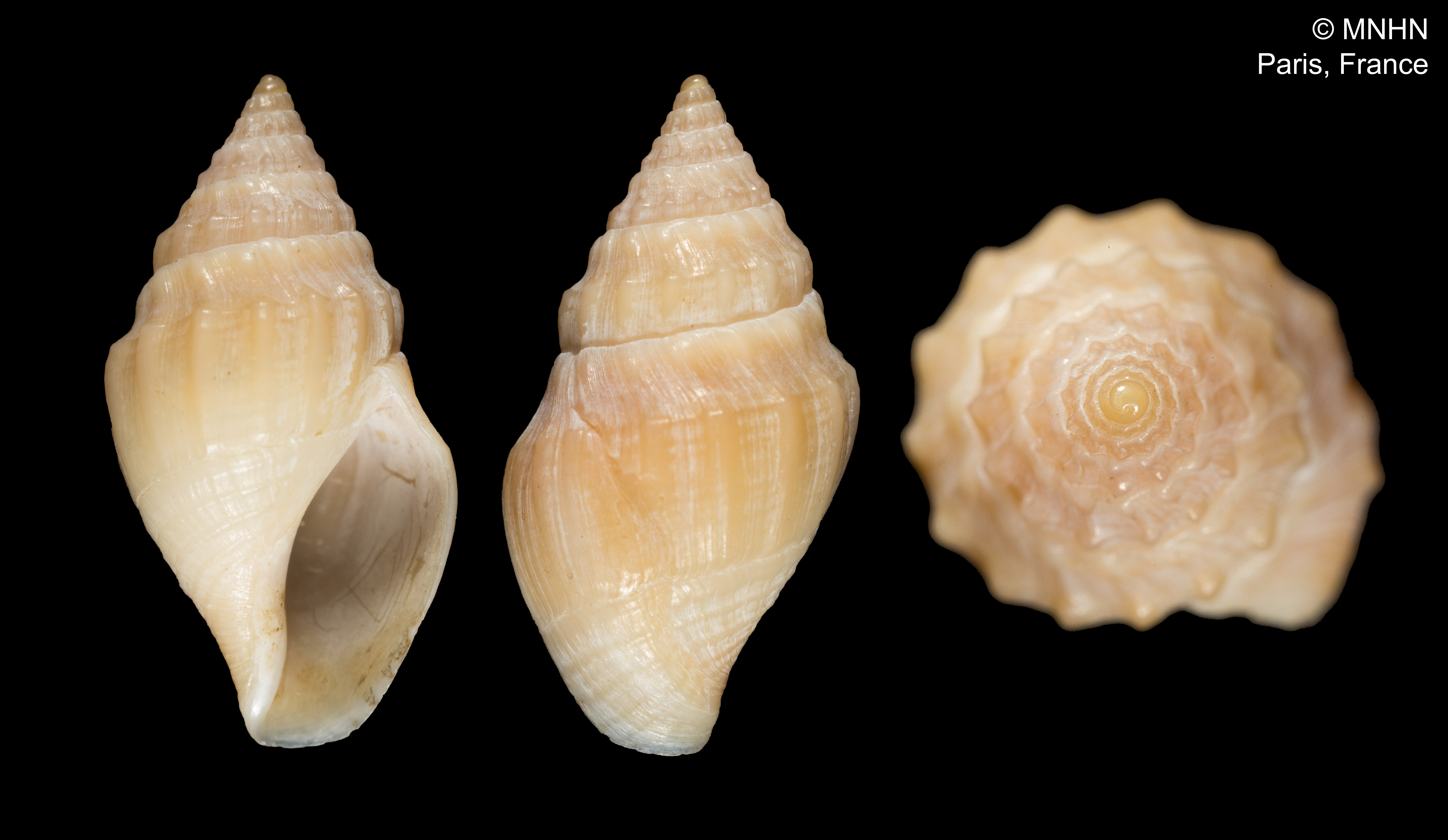
- Shell of Fusulculus crenatus

Scientific classification
- Kingdom: Animalia
- Phylum: Mollusca
- Class: Gastropoda
- Subclass: Caenogastropoda
- Order: Neogastropoda
- Superfamily: Olivoidea
- Family: Benthobiidae
- Genus: Fusulculus; Bouchet & Vermeij, 1998

Type species
- Fusulculus crenatus Bouchet & Vermeij, 1998

Species
- See text

= Fusulculus =

Genus of gastropods

Fusulculus is a genus of sea snails, marine gastropod mollusks in the family Benthobiidae.

== Species ==
Species within the genus Fusulculus include:

- Fusulculus albus Bouchet & Vermeij, 1998
- † Fusulculus alienopriscus Pacaud & Tracey, 2000
- † Fusulculus antiquus (Vincent, 1878)
- Fusulculus crenatus Bouchet & Vermeij, 1998
- † Fusulculus curryi Pacaud & Tracey, 2000
- † Fusulculus hanseni Pacaud, 2020
- † Fusulculus koeneni (Ravn, 1939)
- † Fusulculus macnairyensis (Wade, 1917)
- † Fusulculus multinodulosus (Vermeij, 1998)
- † Fusulculus nanapullus Pacaud & Schnetler, 1999
- † Fusulculus nodulosus (Beyrich, 1854)
- † Fusulculus perminutus (Cossmann, 1923)
- † Fusulculus priscus (Deshayes, 1862)
- † Fusulculus pusillus (Beyrich, 1854)
- † Fusulculus rosenkrantzi (Traub, 1979)
