= Jaspidella mirris =

Scientific classification
- Kingdom: Animalia
- Phylum: Mollusca
- Class: Gastropoda
- Subclass: Caenogastropoda
- Order: Neogastropoda
- Family: Bellolividae
- Genus: Jaspidella
- Species: J. mirris

Binomial name
- Jaspidella mirris Olsson, 1956

Species of gastropod

Jaspidella mirris is a species of sea snail, a marine gastropod mollusk in the family Olividae (the olives snails).
