= Olivellopsis amoni =

Scientific classification
- Kingdom: Animalia
- Phylum: Mollusca
- Class: Gastropoda
- Subclass: Caenogastropoda
- Order: Neogastropoda
- Family: Bellolividae
- Genus: Olivellopsis
- Species: O. amoni

Binomial name
- Olivellopsis amoni (Sterba & Lorenz, 2005)

Synonyms
- Janaoliva amoni (Sterba & Lorenz, 2005); Olivella (Janaoliva) amoni Sterba & Lorenz, 2005; Olivella amoni Sterba & Lorenz, 2005

Species of gastropod

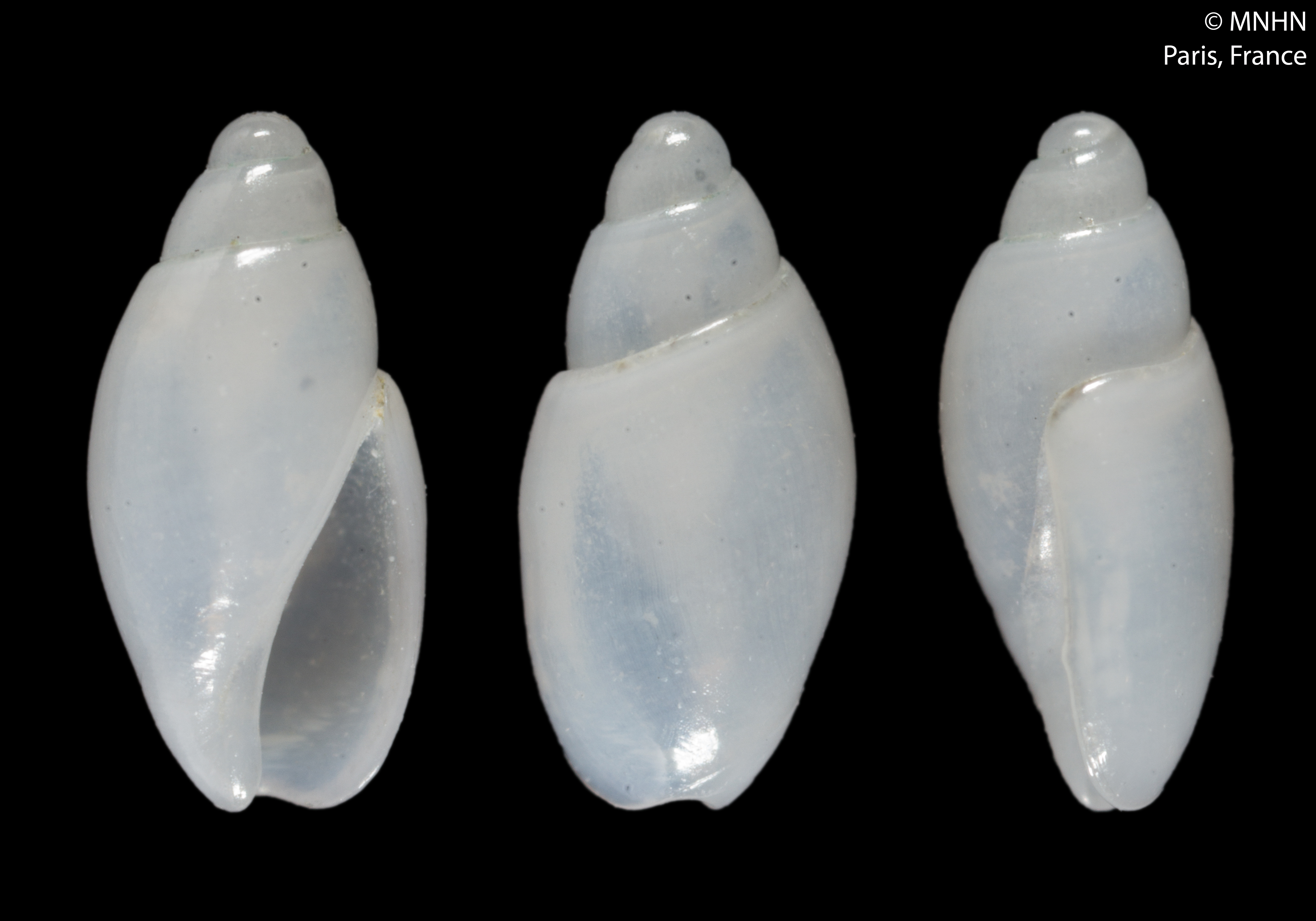
Examples of shells Olivellopsis Amoni may have

Olivellopsis amoni is a species of sea snail, a marine gastropod mollusk in the family Bellolividae.
