= Olivellopsis simplex =

Scientific classification
- Kingdom: Animalia
- Phylum: Mollusca
- Class: Gastropoda
- Subclass: Caenogastropoda
- Order: Neogastropoda
- Family: Bellolividae
- Genus: Olivellopsis
- Species: O. simplex

Binomial name
- Olivellopsis simplex (Pease, 1868)

Synonyms
- Belloliva simplex (Pease, 1868); Janaoliva simplex (Pease, 1868); Olivella (Callianax) simplex Pease, 1868; Olivella simplex Pease, 1868

Species of gastropod

Olivellopsis simplex is a species of sea snail, a marine gastropod mollusk in the family Olividae, the olives.Bellolividae.
