= Jaspidella =

Scientific classification
- Kingdom: Animalia
- Phylum: Mollusca
- Class: Gastropoda
- Subclass: Caenogastropoda
- Order: Neogastropoda
- Family: Bellolividae
- Genus: Jaspidella; Olsson, 1956

Genus of gastropods

Jaspidella is a genus of sea snails, marine gastropod mollusks in the family Bellolividae.

== Species ==
Species within the genus Jaspidella include:

- Jaspidella blanesi (Ford, 1898)
- Jaspidella carminae Petuch, 1992
- Jaspidella jaspidea (Gmelin, 1791)
- Jaspidella mirris Olsson, 1956
