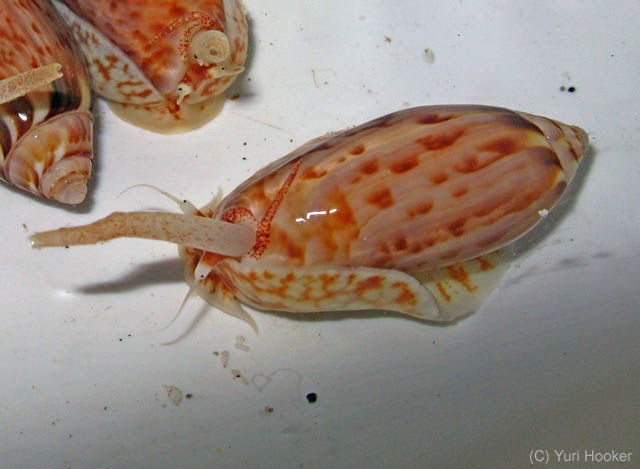
- Live Felicioliva kaleontina
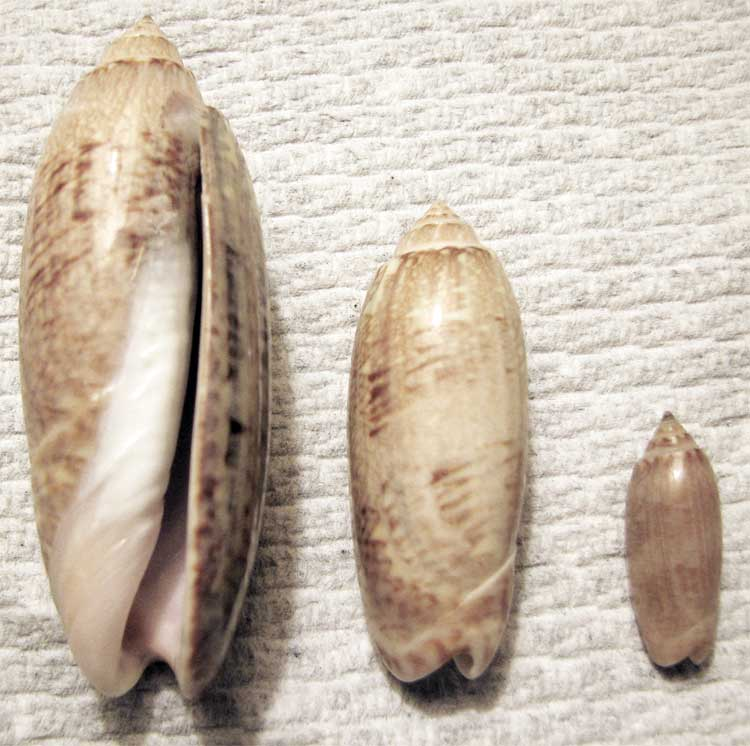
- A growth series of three shells of the lettered olive, in the family Olividae

Scientific classification
- Domain: Eukaryota
- Kingdom: Animalia
- Phylum: Mollusca
- Class: Gastropoda
- Subclass: Caenogastropoda
- Order: Neogastropoda
- Superfamily: Olivoidea; Latreille, 1825

Genera
- See text

Synonyms
- Pseudolivoidea de Gregorio, 1880

= Olivoidea =

Superfamily of gastropods

Olivoidea is a taxonomic superfamily of minute to medium-large predatory sea snails, marine gastropod mollusks in the order Neogastropoda.

== Taxonomy ==
According to the Revised Classification, Nomenclator and Typification of Gastropod Families (2017), the superfamily Olivoidea has five families:

- Family Olividae Latreille, 1825 – Olivellidae is the subfamily Olivellinae in Olividae.
- Family Ancillariidae Swainson, 1840
- Family Bellolividae Kantor, Fedosov, Puillandre, Bonillo & Bouchet, 2017
- Family Benthobiidae Kantor, Fedosov, Puillandre, Bonillo & Bouchet, 2017
- Family Pseudolividae de Gregorio, 1880

Synonyms

- Family Dactylidae H. Adams & A. Adams, 1853: synonym of Olivinae Latreille, 1825
- Subfamily Dipsaccinae P. Fischer, 1884: synonym of Ancillariidae Swainson, 1840
- Family Olivancillariidae Golikov & Starobogatov, 1975: synonym of Olivancillariinae Golikov & Starobogatov, 1975
- Family Olivellidae Troschel, 1869: synonym of Olivellinae Troschel, 1869
- Subfamily † Vanpalmeriinae Adegoke, 1977: synonym of Ancillariidae Swainson, 1840
- Family Zemiridae Iredale, 1924: synonym of Pseudolividae de Gregorio, 1880

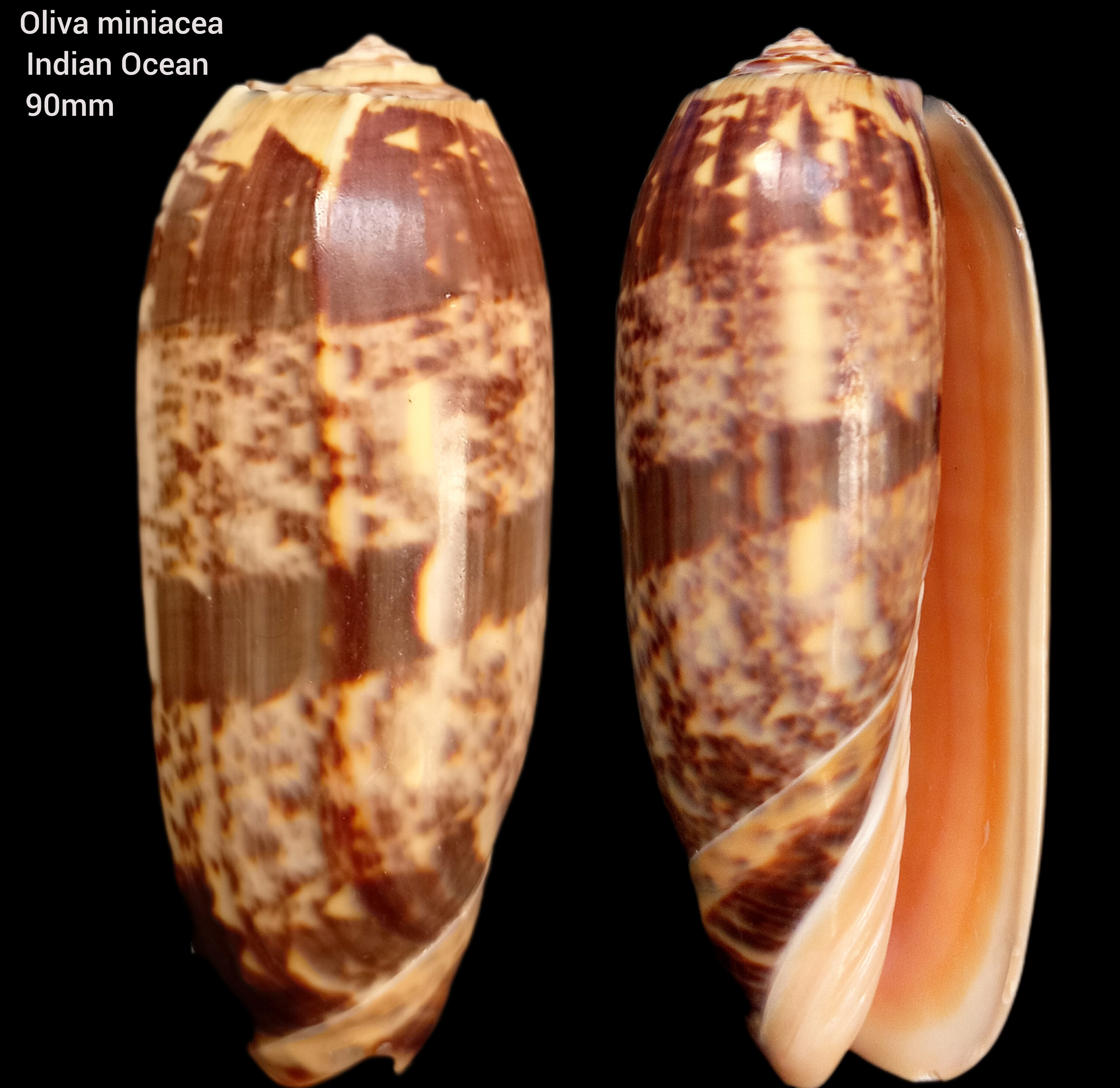
Oliva miniacea
