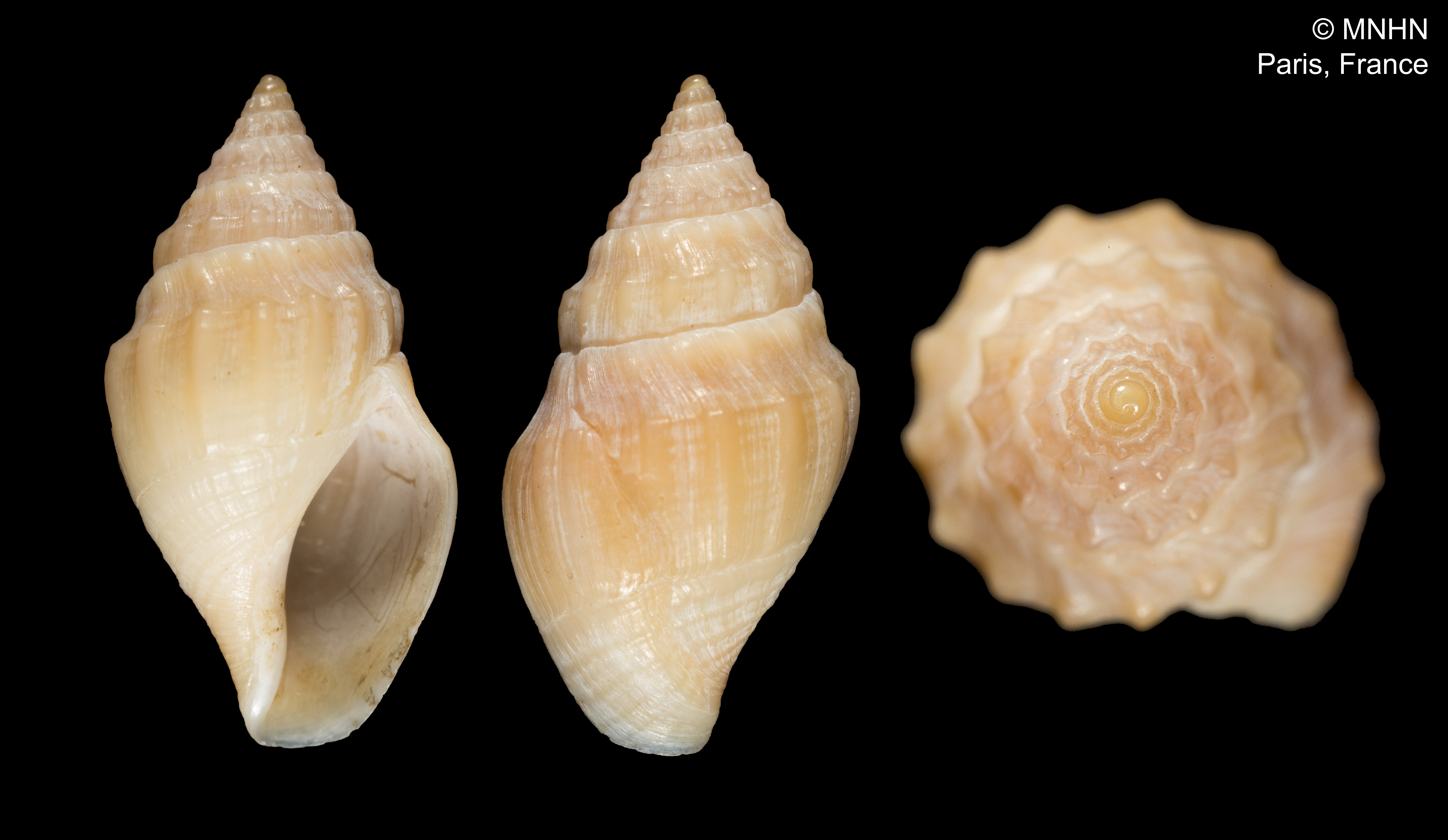
- Fusulculus crenatus

Scientific classification
- Kingdom: Animalia
- Phylum: Mollusca
- Class: Gastropoda
- Subclass: Caenogastropoda
- Order: Neogastropoda
- Superfamily: Olivoidea
- Family: Benthobiidae

Genera
- See text.

= Benthobiidae =

Family of gastropods

The Benthobiidae is a taxonomic family of sea snails, marine gastropod molluscs in the superfamily Olivoidea.

== Genera ==
Genera within the family Benthobiidae include:

- Benthobia Dall, 1889
- Fusulculus Bouchet & Vermeij, 1998

Genera brought into synonymy:

- Nux Barnard, 1960: synonym of Benthobia Dall, 1889
