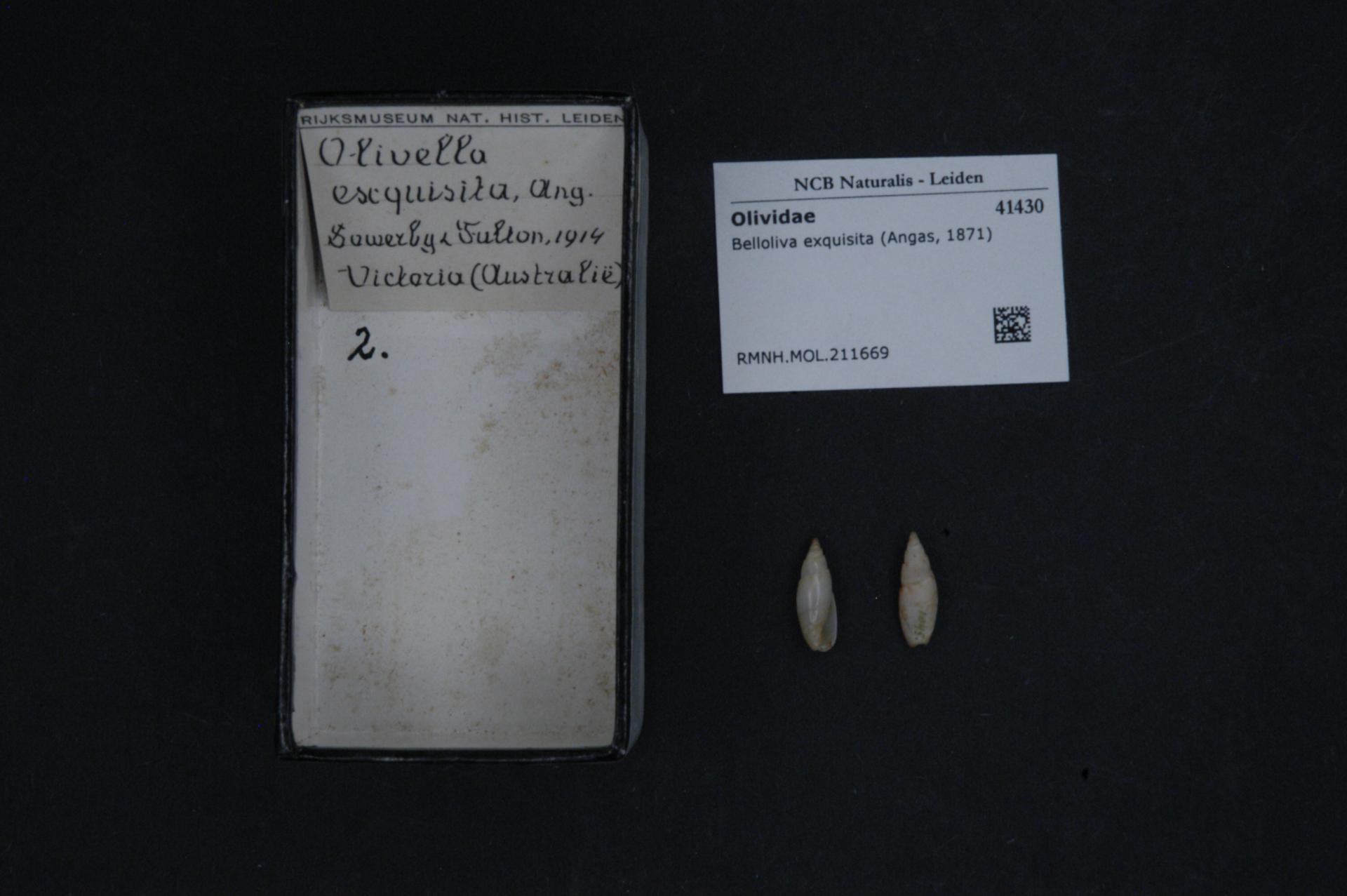
- Belloliva exquisita

Scientific classification
- Kingdom: Animalia
- Phylum: Mollusca
- Class: Gastropoda
- Subclass: Caenogastropoda
- Order: Neogastropoda
- Superfamily: Olivoidea
- Family: Bellolividae; Kantor, Fedosov, Puillandre, Bonillo & Bouchet, 2017

Genera
- See text

= Bellolividae =

Family of gastropods

The Bellolividae is a taxonomic family of sea snails, marine gastropod molluscs in the superfamily Olivoidea.

== Genera ==
Genera within the family Bellolividae include:

- Belloliva Peile, 1922
- Jaspidella Olsson, 1956
- Olivellopsis Thiele, 1929

Genera brought into synonymy

- Janaoliva Sterba & Lorenz, 2005: synonym of Olivellopsis Thiele, 1929
