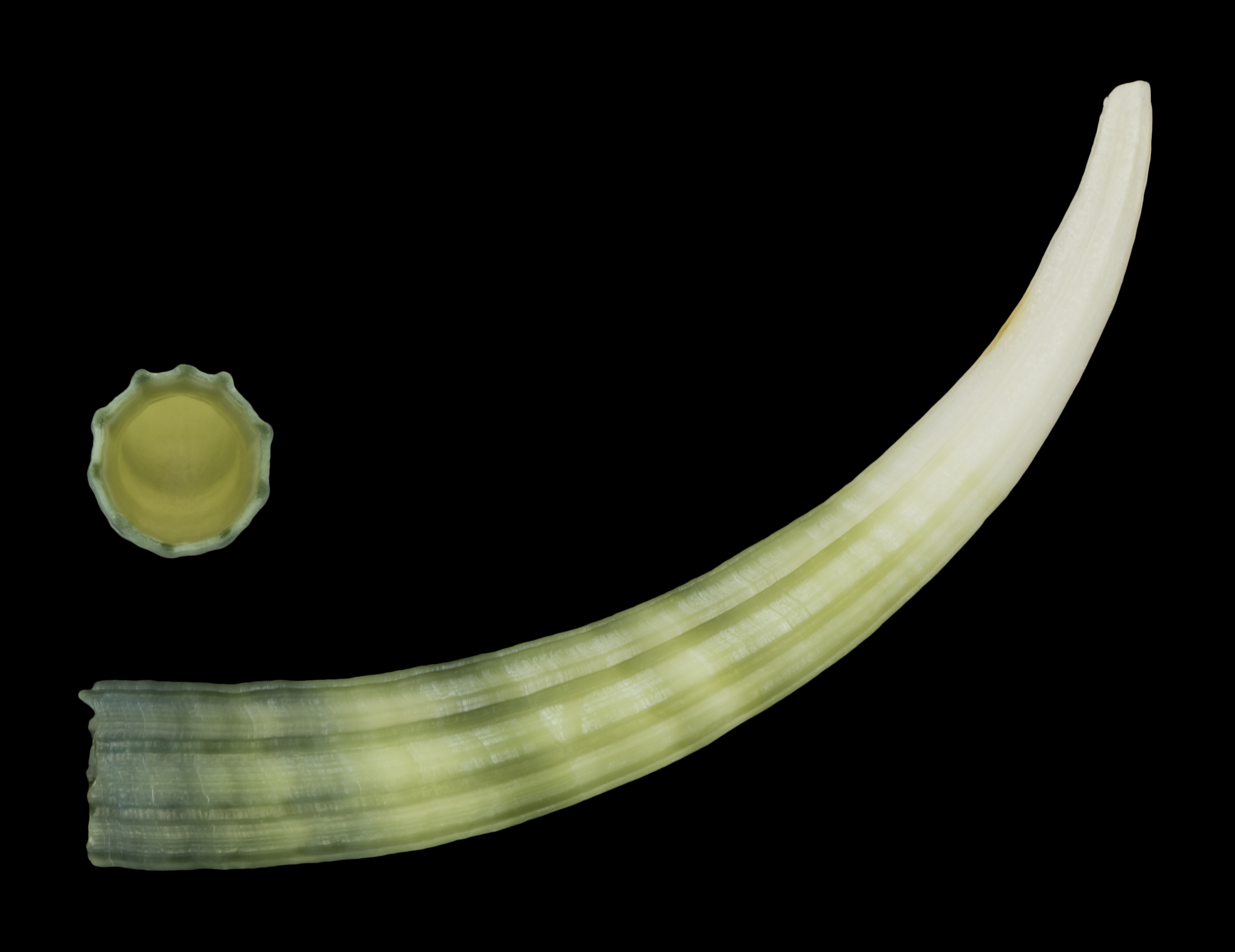

Scientific classification
- Kingdom: Animalia
- Phylum: Mollusca
- Class: Scaphopoda
- Order: Dentaliida
- Family: Dentaliidae
- Genus: Dentalium
- Species: D. elephantinum

Binomial name
- Dentalium elephantinum Linnaeus, 1758

= Dentalium elephantinum =

Species of mollusc

Dentalium elephantinum, the elephant tusk, is a species of scaphopod mollusc. Its shell is often deep green fading to white at its tip and has between eight and 17 strong ribs along its sides. Adults are about 70 mm in length with a diameter of about 11 mm at the shell aperture. It is native to Ambon Island, the Philippine Islands, and the Red Sea.
