= Dentalium longitrorsum =

Scientific classification
- Kingdom: Animalia
- Phylum: Mollusca
- Class: Scaphopoda
- Order: Dentaliida
- Family: Dentaliidae
- Genus: Dentalium
- Species: D. longitrorsum

Binomial name
- Dentalium longitrorsum Reeve, 1842

Species of mollusc

Dentalium longitrorsum is a species of tusk shell, a marine scaphopod mollusk in the family Dentaliidae.

== Description ==
The shell is a slender and long, about 100mm. It is white with a slight curve and the openings at both ends are circular.
