= Dentalium nanum =

Scientific classification
- Kingdom: Animalia
- Phylum: Mollusca
- Class: Scaphopoda
- Order: Dentaliida
- Family: Dentaliidae
- Genus: Dentalium
- Species: D. nanum

Binomial name
- Dentalium nanum Hutton, 1873

Species of mollusc

Dentalium nanum is a tusk shell of the family Dentaliidae, endemic to New Zealand waters. The Dentalium shell was traditionally used for decorative purposes by Māori, such as rings and necklaces, and has typically found at archaeological sites around the Coromandel Peninsula.
