= Fissidentalium =

Scientific classification
- Domain: Eukaryota
- Kingdom: Animalia
- Phylum: Mollusca
- Class: Scaphopoda
- Order: Dentaliida
- Family: Dentaliidae
- Genus: Fissidentalium; Fischer, 1885

Genus of molluscs

Fissidentalium is a genus of molluscs belonging to the family Dentaliidae.

The genus has cosmopolitan distribution.

== Species ==
Species:

- Species Fissidentalium actiniophorum Shimek, 1997
- Species Fissidentalium aegeum (R. B. Watson, 1879)
- Species Fissidentalium amphialum (R. B. Watson, 1879)
- Species Fissidentalium candidum (Jeffreys, 1877)
- Species Fissidentalium capillosum (Jeffreys, 1877)
- Species Fissidentalium ceras (R. B. Watson, 1879)
- Species Fissidentalium complexum (Dall, 1895)
- Species Fissidentalium concinnum (E. von Martens, 1878)
- Species Fissidentalium cornubovis (E. A. Smith, 1906)
- Species Fissidentalium edenensis Lamprell & Healy, 1998
- Species Fissidentalium elizabethae Lamprell & Healy, 1998
- Species Fissidentalium erosum Shimek & Moreno, 1996
- Species Fissidentalium eualdes (Barnard, 1963)
- Species Fissidentalium eupatrides (Melvill & Standen, 1907)
- Species Fissidentalium exasperatum (G. B. Sowerby III, 1903)
- Species Fissidentalium franklinae Lamprell & Healy, 1998
- Species Fissidentalium metivieri Scarabino, 1995
- Species Fissidentalium opacum (G. B. Sowerby I, 1828)
- Species Fissidentalium paucicostatum (R. B. Watson, 1879)
- Species Fissidentalium peruvianum (Dall, 1908)
- Species Fissidentalium platypleurum (Tomlin, 1931)
- Species Fissidentalium ponderi Lamprell & Healy, 1998
- Species Fissidentalium profundorum (E. A. Smith, 1894)
- Species Fissidentalium horikoshii Okutani, 1982
- Species Fissidentalium kawamurai Kuroda & Habe, 1961
- Species Fissidentalium laterischismum Shikama & Habe, 1963
- Species Fissidentalium levii Scarabino, 1995
- Species Fissidentalium lima Kuroda & Habe, 1963
- Species Fissidentalium magnificum (E. A. Smith, 1896)
- Species Fissidentalium malayanum (Boissevain, 1906)
- Species Fissidentalium megathyris (Dall, 1890)
- Species Fissidentalium sahlmanni Dharma & Eng, 2009
- Species Fissidentalium salpinx Tomlin, 1931
- Species Fissidentalium semivestitum (Locard, 1897)
- Species Fissidentalium serrulatum (E. A. Smith, 1906)
- Species Fissidentalium shirleyae Lamprell & Healy, 1998
- Species Fissidentalium shoplandi (Jousseaume, 1894)
- Species Fissidentalium tenuicostatum Z. Qi & X.-T. Ma, 1989
- Species Fissidentalium transversostriatum Boissevain, 1906
- Species Fissidentalium verconis Cotton & Ludbrook, 1938
- Species Fissidentalium vicdani Kosuge, 1981
- Species Fissidentalium waterhousae Lamprell & Healy, 1998
- Species Fissidentalium yokoyamai (Makiyama, 1931)
- Species Fissidentalium zelandicum (G. B. Sowerby II, 1860)
- Species Fissidentalium scamnatum (Locard, 1897) accepted as Fissidentalium capillosum (Jeffreys, 1877) (junior synonym)
- Species Fissidentalium meridionale (Pilsbry & Sharp, 1897) accepted as Fissidentalium candidum (Jeffreys, 1877) (synonym)
- Species Fissidentalium majorinum (Mabille & Rochebrune, 1889) accepted as Dentalium majorinum Mabille & Rochebrune, 1889
- Species Fissidentalium pseudohungerfordi Sahlmann, van der Beek & Wiese, 2016 accepted as Compressidentalium pseudohungerfordi (Sahlmann, van der Beek & Wiese, 2016) (original combination)
- Species Fissidentalium gaussianum (Plate, 1908) accepted as Dentalium majorinum Mabille & Rochebrune, 1889
- Species Fissidentalium georgiense (Henderson, 1920) accepted as Antalis occidentalis (Stimpson, 1851) (synonym)
- Subgenus Fissidentalium (Compressidentalium) Habe, 1963 accepted as Compressidentalium Habe, 1963
  - Species Fissidentalium (Compressidentalium) hungerfordi (Pilsbry & Sharp, 1897) accepted as Compressidentalium hungerfordi (Pilsbry & Sharp, 1897)
  - Species Fissidentalium (Compressidentalium) pseudohungerfordi Sahlmann, van der Beek & Wiese, 2016 accepted as Compressidentalium pseudohungerfordi (Sahlmann, van der Beek & Wiese, 2016) (basionym)
- Subgenus Fissidentalium (Pictodentalium) Habe, 1963 accepted as Pictodentalium (Habe, 1963)
  - Species Fissidentalium (Pictodentalium) formosum (Adams & Reeve, 1850) accepted as Pictodentalium formosum (A. Adams & Reeve, 1850)
    - Subspecies Fissidentalium (Pictodentalium) formosum harrisoni Habe, 1970 accepted as Pictodentalium formosum (A. Adams & Reeve, 1850)
- Species Fissidentalium exuberans (Locard, 1897) accepted as Fissidentalium paucicostatum (R. B. Watson, 1879) (junior synonym)
- Species Fissidentalium floridense (Henderson, 1920) accepted as Coccodentalium carduus (Dall, 1889) (synonymy)
- Species Fissidentalium formosum (A. Adams & Reeve, 1850) accepted as Pictodentalium formosum (A. Adams & Reeve, 1850)
- Species Fissidentalium ergasticum (P. Fischer, 1883) accepted as Fissidentalium capillosum (Jeffreys, 1877) (junior synonym)
- Species Fissidentalium carduum (Dall, 1889) accepted as Coccodentalium carduus (Dall, 1889)
- Species Fissidentalium carduus (Dall, 1889) accepted as Coccodentalium carduus (Dall, 1889)
