= Dentalium gouldii =

Scientific classification
- Kingdom: Animalia
- Phylum: Mollusca
- Class: Scaphopoda
- Order: Dentaliida
- Family: Dentaliidae
- Genus: Dentalium
- Species: D. gouldii

Binomial name
- Dentalium gouldii Dall, 1889

Species of mollusc

Dentalium gouldii, commonly called the Gould tuskshell, is a species of tusk shell, a marine scaphopod mollusc in the family Dentaliidae.
