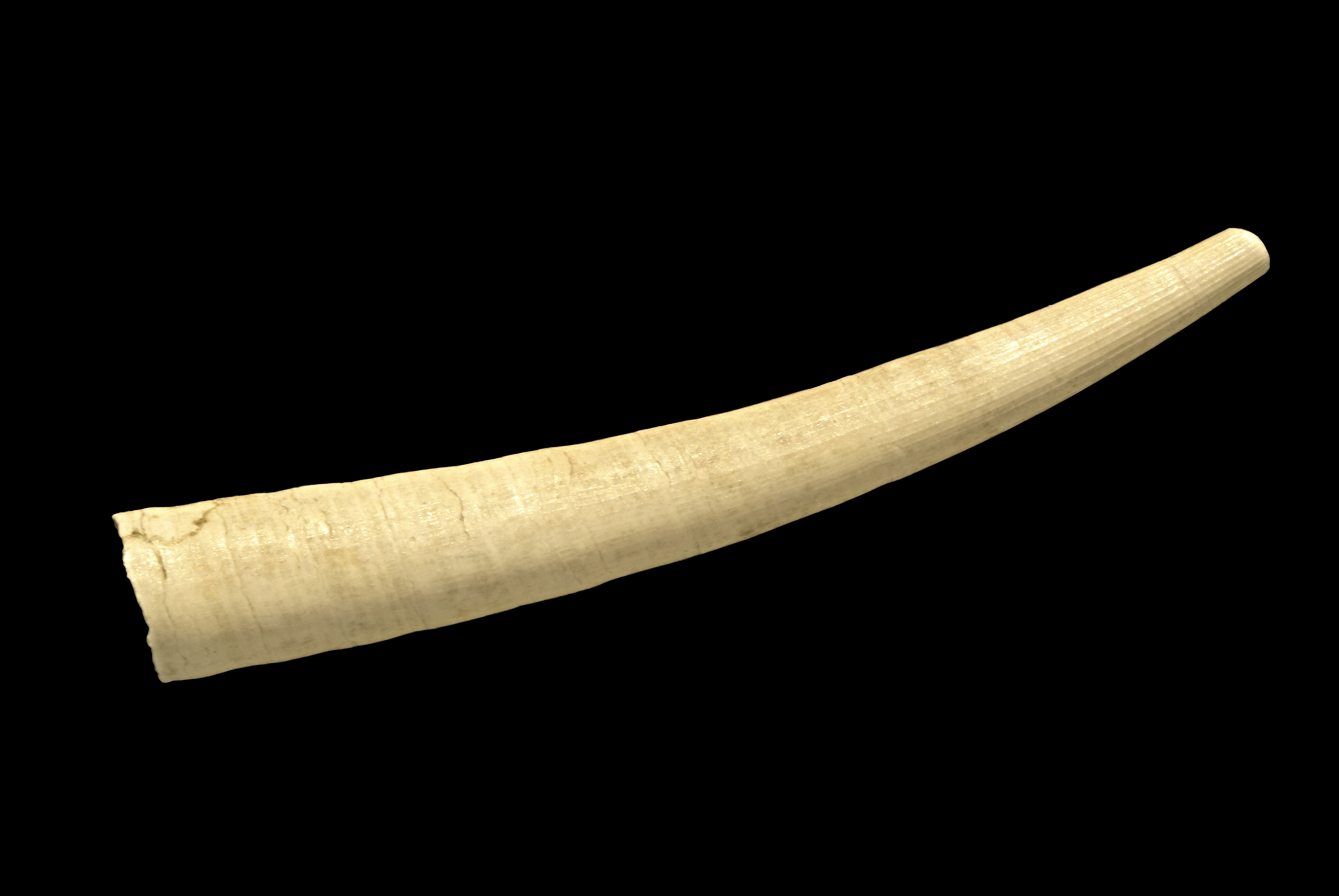

Scientific classification
- Kingdom: Animalia
- Phylum: Mollusca
- Class: Scaphopoda
- Order: Dentaliida
- Family: Dentaliidae
- Genus: Antalis
- Species: A. vulgaris

Binomial name
- Antalis vulgaris (da Costa, 1778)

Synonyms
- Dentalium vulgare (da Costa, 1778)

= Antalis vulgaris =

Species of mollusc

Antalis vulgaris, commonly known as the common tusk shell, is a species of scaphopods mainly encountered on sandy bottoms from 5 to 1000 meters depth.

== Description ==
Antalis vulgaris is a small mollusc of 3 to 6 cm length with a characteristic elephant tusk shape. Its shell is opaque white and displays closely spaced longitudinal striations on the posterior portion. The anterior aperture (thinnest end) is circular and is occluded by a septum with a central pipe bearing a circular orifice.

== Distribution ==
The common tusk shell is found from south-western United Kingdom to western Mediterranean.

=== Diet ===
The species stands vertically in soft grounds and search the sand with specific adhesive tentacles (captacula) for small benthic species such as foraminifera.

=== Reproduction ===
Separated sexes. The fecundation is external and gives rise to planktonic larvae called trochophore.

== Similar species ==
- Antalis entalis (Linnaeus, 1758) is smaller (4cm), has a pyriform-shaped anterior orifice and has no longitudinal striations.
- Fustiaria rubescens (Deshayes, 1825) is smaller (3.5cm) and has a pink coloration.
- Ditrupa arietina (O. F. Müller, 1776) is an annelid belonging to the polychaete class and living in a calcified conical tube.
