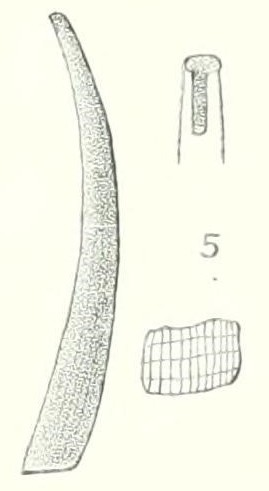
- Antalis diarrhox, 17.5 × 2.2 mm

Scientific classification
- Kingdom: Animalia
- Phylum: Mollusca
- Class: Scaphopoda
- Order: Dentaliida
- Family: Dentaliidae
- Genus: Antalis
- Species: A. diarrhox

Binomial name
- Antalis diarrhox (Watson, 1879 )

Synonyms
- Dentalium diarrhox R. B. Watson, 1879

= Antalis diarrhox =

Species of mollusc

Antalis diarrhox is a species of tusk shell, a marine scaphopod mollusk in the family Dentaliidae.

This species is endemic to New Zealand waters. It is found north east of East Cape at about 1,300 m, on the Chatham Rise at about 220 m, and in the Tasman Sea at about 610 m.
