= Eudentalium =

Scientific classification
- Kingdom: Animalia
- Phylum: Mollusca
- Class: Scaphopoda
- Order: Dentaliida
- Family: Dentaliidae
- Genus: Eudentalium; Cotton & Godfrey, 1933

Genus of molluscs

Eudentalium is a genus of molluscs belonging to the family Dentaliidae.

The species of this genus are found in Australia.

== Species ==
- Eudentalium quadricostatum (Brazier, 1877)
