= Coccodentalium =

Scientific classification
- Domain: Eukaryota
- Kingdom: Animalia
- Phylum: Mollusca
- Class: Scaphopoda
- Order: Dentaliida
- Family: Dentaliidae
- Genus: Coccodentalium; Sacco, 1896

Genus of molluscs

Coccodentalium is a genus of molluscs belonging to the family Dentaliidae.

The species of this genus are found in Europe, America and Southeastern Asia.

Species:

- Coccodentalium cancellatum (Sowerby II, 1860)
- Coccodentalium carduus (Dall, 1889)
- Coccodentalium gemmiparum (Melvill, 1909)
- Coccodentalium radula (Gmelin, 1791)
