= Graptacme =

Scientific classification
- Kingdom: Animalia
- Phylum: Mollusca
- Class: Scaphopoda
- Order: Dentaliida
- Family: Dentaliidae
- Genus: Graptacme; Pilsbry & Sharp, 1897

Genus of molluscs

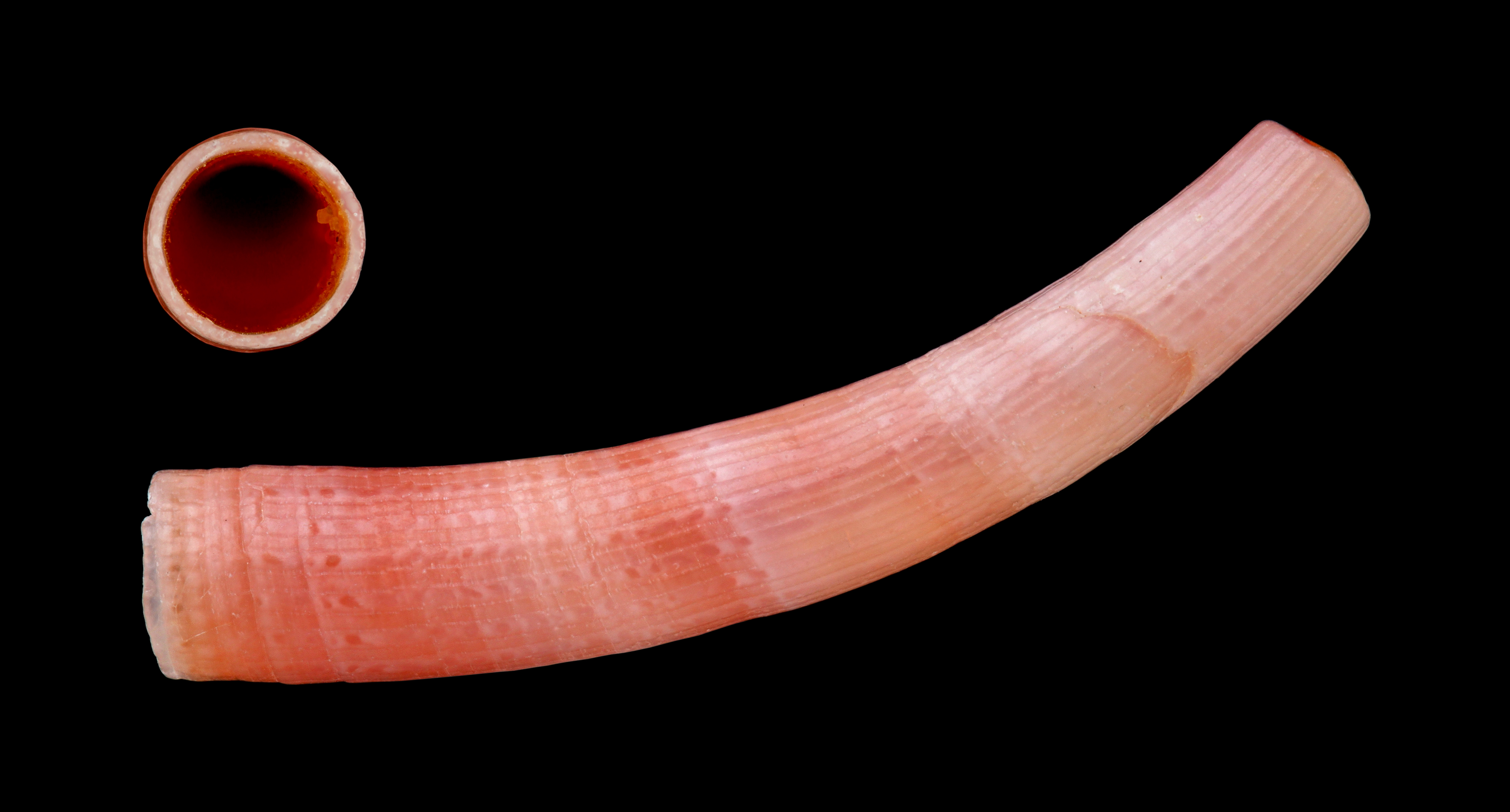
Graptacme marchadi

Graptacme is a genus of molluscs belonging to the family Dentaliidae.

The genus has almost a cosmopolitan distribution.

== Species ==
Species:

- Graptacme acutissima (R. B. Watson, 1879)
- Graptacme acutistriata G. Steiner & Kabat, 2004
- Graptacme africana (G. B. Sowerby III, 1903)
- Graptacme calamus (Dall, 1889)
- Graptacme eborea (Conrad, 1846)
- Graptacme elpis (Winckworth, 1927)
- Graptacme inversa (Deshayes, 1826)
- Graptacme lactea (Deshayes, 1826)
- Graptacme marchadi (Nicklès, 1979)
- Graptacme multistricta (Finlay & Marwick, 1937) †
- Graptacme nielseni Lamprell & Healy, 1998
- Graptacme novaehollandiae (Chenu, 1843)
- Graptacme pareorensis (Pilsbry & Sharp, 1897) †
- Graptacme perlonga (Dall, 1881)
- Graptacme secta (Deshayes, 1826)
- Graptacme semistriata (W. Turton, 1819)
- Graptacme semistriolata (Guilding, 1834)
- Graptacme splendida (G. B. Sowerby I, 1832)
- Graptacme takakoae Tsuchida & Tachi, 1999
