= Laevidentalium =

Scientific classification
- Kingdom: Animalia
- Phylum: Mollusca
- Class: Scaphopoda
- Order: Dentaliida
- Family: Laevidentaliidae
- Genus: Laevidentalium; Cossmann, 1888

Genus of molluscs

Laevidentalium is a genus of molluscs belonging to the family Laevidentaliidae.

The genus has cosmopolitan distribution.

== Species ==
Species:

- Laevidentalium abyplaine V.Scarabino & F.Scarabino, 2011
- Laevidentalium acicula† (Deshayes, 1861)
- Laevidentalium acriculum† (Tate, 1887)
- Laevidentalium ambiguum (Chenu, 1843) (nomen dubium)
- Laevidentalium australe† (Sharp & Pilsbry, 1898)
- Laevidentalium burdigalinum† (Mayer, 1864)
- Laevidentalium coruscum (Pilsbry, 1905)
- Laevidentalium cretaustralium† Stilwell, 1999
- Laevidentalium didymum (Watson, 1879)
- Laevidentalium eburneum (Linnaeus, 1767)
- Laevidentalium ensiforme (Chenu, 1842)
- Laevidentalium erectum (G.B.Sowerby II, 1860)
- Laevidentalium feruglioi† Brunet, 1995
- Laevidentalium fodinense† P.A.Maxwell, 1988
- Laevidentalium gofasi Scarabino, 1995
- Laevidentalium houbricki Scarabino, 1995
- Laevidentalium incertum† (Deshayes, 1825)
- Laevidentalium jaffaense (Cotton & Ludbrook, 1938)
- Laevidentalium largicrescens (Tate, 1899)
- Laevidentalium leptosceles (R.B.Watson, 1879)
- Laevidentalium longitrorsum (Reeve, 1842)
- Laevidentalium limatum† (Stanton, 1901)
- Laevidentalium lubricatum (G.B.Sowerby II, 1860)
- Laevidentalium marshae Lamprell & Healy, 1998
- Laevidentalium martyi Lamprell & Healy, 1998
- Laevidentalium morganianum† Wilckens, 1922
- Laevidentalium nitidum† (Deshayes, 1861)
- Laevidentalium pictile† (Tate, 1899)
- Laevidentalium philippinarum (Sowerby, 1860)
- Laevidentalium rectius (Carpenter, 1864)
- Laevidentalium soliticum† (Piette, 1855)
- Laevidentalium subfissura† (Tate, 1887)
- Laevidentalium translucidum (Deshayes, 1826) (nomen dubium)
- Laevidentalium waihoraense† Emerson, 1954
- Laevidentalium wiesei Sahlmann, 2012
- Laevidentalium wilckensi† Medina & del Valle, 1985
- Laevidentalium zeidleri Lamprell & Healy, 1998
