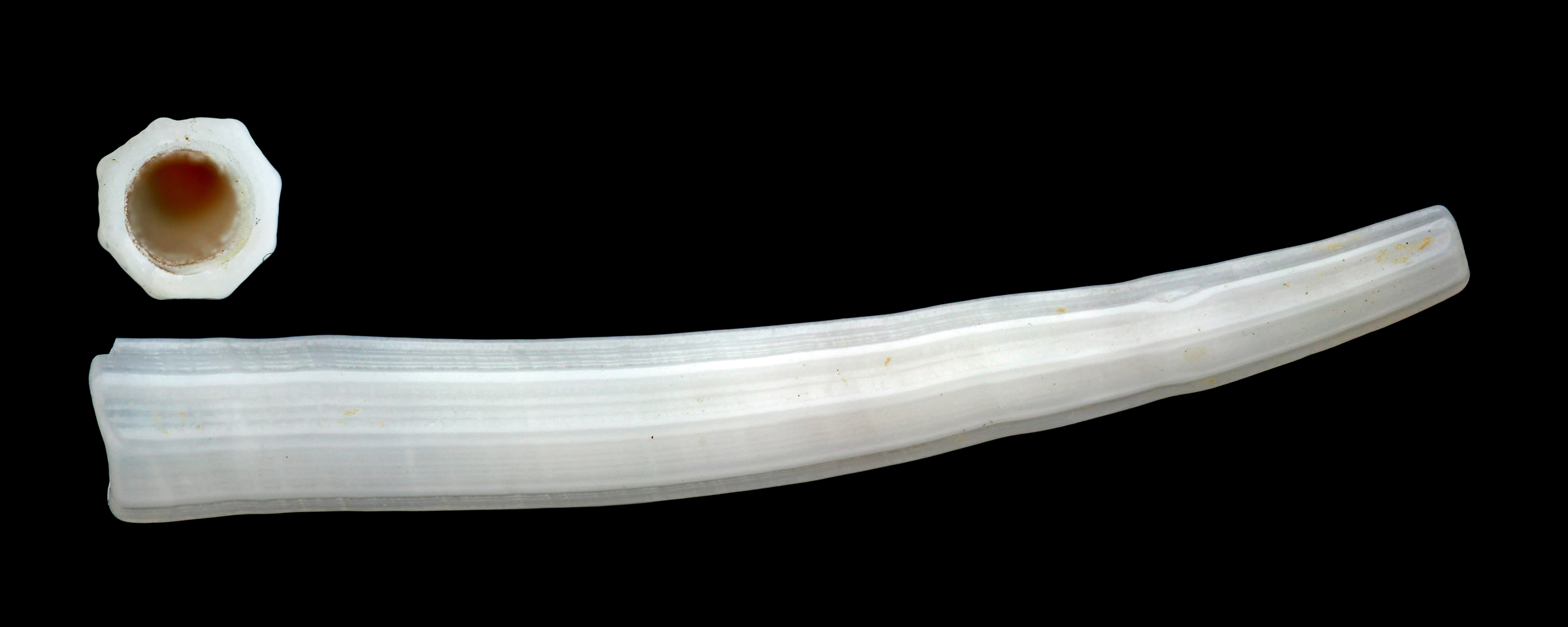
- Dentalium octangulatum Donovan, 1804

Scientific classification
- Kingdom: Animalia
- Phylum: Mollusca
- Class: Scaphopoda
- Order: Dentaliida
- Family: Dentaliidae
- Genus: Dentalium; Linnaeus, 1758

Species
- 50, see text

Synonyms
- Dentalia Perry, 1811; Dentalites Schlotheim, 1813; Dentalium (Dentalium) Linnaeus, 1758· accepted, alternate representation; Dentalium (Lentigodentalium) Habe, 1963; Dentalium (Paradentalium) Cotton & Godfrey, 1933; Lentigodentalium Habe, 1963 (a junior synonym)

= Dentalium (genus) =

Dentalium Temporal range: Silurian - Recent

Genus of molluscs

Dentalium is a large genus of tooth shells or tusk shells, marine scaphopod molluscs in the family Dentaliidae. The genus contains 50 described species and about 50 extinct species.

== Etymology ==
The scientific name of this genus comes from the Latin word dentis, meaning tooth, based on the tooth or tusk-shaped form of these molluscs.

== Description ==
The mantle of Dentalium species is entirely within the shell. The foot extends from the larger end of the shell, and is used to burrow through the substrate. They position their head down in the substrate, with the apical end of the shell (at the rear of the animal's body) projecting up into the water. These molluscs live on seafloor sediment, feeding on microscopic organisms, detritus, and foraminiferans.

The shells are conical and curved in a planispiral way, and they are usually whitish in color. Because of these characteristics, the shell somewhat resembles a miniature elephant's tusk. They are hollow and open at both ends; the opening at the larger end is the main or anterior aperture of the shell. The smaller opening is known as the apical aperture.

== Human use ==
=== South Asia ===
At Mehrgarh, a village located at the foot of the Bolan Pass in Balochistan in modern-day Pakistan, ornaments made of Dentalium shell have been found at burial sites dating back to 6000 BCE.

Excavations conducted by Jean-François Jarrige have described 'Exceptional grave deposits of Dentalium headbands found on the heads of several females… In Burial 274, the headband was made of woven rows of small dentalium and closed by two straps used as a clasp'.

=== Native Americans ===
The shells of Dentalium neohexagonum have been used by Indigenous people of the Pacific Northwest and West Coast as a form of status and currency since time immemorial. The Chumash people have also been reported using dentalium as early as circa 1000 AD, in the Morro Bay area.

=== New Zealand ===
Māori traditionally used Dentalium shells for decorative purposes, such as rings and necklaces. Most artefacts have been found around the Coromandel Peninsula, and typically earlier artefacts during the Archaic Period (1300–1500) are Dentalium solidum, while later shells are Dentalium nanum.

=== 18th-century European use ===
In pre-modern medicine, these shells were considered an excellent alkali, and apothecaries would pulverize them for use in several preparations. The shell used for this purpose was described by Joseph Pitton de Tournefort in London in the 18th century as being "of a tubular, or conical form, about 3 inches (7.62 cm) long; of a shining, greenish white; hollow; light, and divided lengthwise by parallel lines, running from top to bottom. It is about the thickness of a feather, and bears some resemblance to a canine tooth." However, it was considered at that time to be very rare, and in lieu of that, another shell was usually substituted. This was described as a multicolored shell found in the sand where the tide had fallen; this shell was not channeled, or fluted. The large green shell to which the writer first refers must have been either Dentalium elephantinum or Dentalium aprinum, both of which are large and greenish, and live in the Indo-Pacific zone. The other shell was presumably another species, possibly Dentalium entale, which is native to Great Britain.

== Species ==
Species within the genus Dentalium include:

- Dentalium aciculum Gould, 1859
- Dentalium adenense Ludbrook, 1954
- Dentalium agassizi Pilsbry and Sharp, 1897 Stained tuskshell
- Dentalium americanum Chenu, 1843 American tuskshell
- Dentalium antillarum D'Orbigny, 1842
- Dentalium aprinum Linnaeus, 1766
- Dentalium bartletti Henderson, 1920
- Dentalium calamus Dall, 1889
- Dentalium callipeplum Dall, 1889
- Dentalium callithrix Dall, 1889
- Dentalium carduum Dall, 1889
- Dentalium ceratum (Dall, 1881)
- Dentalium circumcinctum Watson, 1879
- Dentalium cheverti Sharp & Pilsbry, 1897
- Dentalium clavus A. H. Cooke, 1885
- Dentalium collinsae Lamprell & Healy, 1998
- Dentalium congoense Plate, 1908
- Dentalium cookei Sharp & Pilsbry, 1897
- Dentalium crosnieri Scarabino, 1995
- Dentalium curtum G. B. Sowerby II, 1860
- Dentalium dalli Pilsbry and Sharp, 1897
- Dentalium debitusae Scarabino, 2008
- Dentalium dentale Linnaeus, 1766 European tusk
- Dentalium didymum Watson, 1879
- Dentalium eboreum Conrad, 1846 Ivory tusk
- Dentalium ecostatum T W Kirk, 1880
- Dentalium elephantinum Linnaeus, 1758 - Elephant tusk
- Dentalium ensiculus Jeffereys, 1877
- Dentalium entale entale (Linnaeus, 1758)
- Dentalium entale stimpsoni (Henderson, 1920)
- Dentalium entale Linnaeus, 1758
- Dentalium floridense J. B. Henderson, 1920
- Dentalium formosum Adams & Reeve, 1850 Formosan tusk
- Dentalium glaucarena Dell, 1953
- Dentalium gouldii Dall, 1889 Gould tuskshell
- Dentalium grahami Lamprell & Healy, 1998
- Dentalium healyi Steiner & Kabat, 2004
- Dentalium hedleyi Lamprell & Healy, 1998
- Dentalium hillae Lamprell & Healy, 1998
- Dentalium humboldti Sahlmann & van der Beek, 2016
- Dentalium inversum Deshayes, 1825
- Dentalium laqueatum A. E. Verrill, 1885 Reticulate tuskshell
- Dentalium liodon Pilsbry and Sharp, 1897
- Dentalium longitrorsum Reeve, 1842 Elongate tusk
- Dentalium magellanicum Pilsbry & Sharp, 1897
- Dentalium majorinum Mabille & Rochebrune, 1889
- Dentalium malekulaense Scarabino, 2008
- Dentalium meridionale Pilsbry and Sharp, 1897
- Dentalium nanum Hutton, 1873
- Dentalium neohexagonum Sharp and Pilsbry, 1897 Hexagon tuskshell
- Dentalium occidentale Stimpson, 1851
- Dentalium octangulatum Donovan, 1804 Octagonal tusk
- Dentalium oerstedii Mörch, 1861
- Dentalium ophiodon Dall, 1881
- Dentalium oryx Boissevain, 1906
- Dentalium perlongum Dall, 1881
- Dentalium peitaihoense S. G. King & Ping, 1935
- Dentalium pilsbryi Rehder, 1942
- Dentalium pluricostatum Boissevain, 1906
- Dentalium poindimiense Scarabino, 2008
- Dentalium potteri Lamprell & Healy, 1998
- Dentalium pretiosum Sowerby, 1860 Indian-money tusk
- Dentalium rebeccaense Henderson, 1920
- Dentalium rectius Carpenter, 1864
- Dentalium semistriolatum Guilding, 1834 Half-scratched tusk
- Dentalium senegalense Dautzenberg, 1891 Senegal tusk
- Dentalium sowerbyi Guilding, 1834
- Dentalium stenochizum Pilsbry and Sharp, 1897
- Dentalium strigatum Gould, 1859
- Dentalium stumkatae Lamprell & Healy, 1998
- Dentalium suteri Emerson, 1954
- Dentalium taphrium Dall, 1889
- Dentalium texasianum Philippi, 1848
- Dentalium tiwhana Dell, 1953
- Dentalium tubulatum Henderson, 1920
- Dentalium vallicolens Raymond, 1904 Trench tuskshell
- Dentalium vernedei Sowerby, 1860l Vernede's tusk
- Dentalium vitreum Sars, 1851
- Dentalium vulgare da Costa, 1778 Common tusk
- Dentalium zelandicum Sowerby, 1860 New Zealand tusk

Species brought into synonymy

- Dentalium diarrhox Watson, 1879: synonym of Antalis diarrhox (R. B. Watson, 1879)

== Extinct species ==
Extinct species within the genus Dentalium include:

- †Dentalium akasakensis Hayasaka 1925
- †Dentalium alazanum Cooke 1928
- †Dentalium angsananum Martin 1922
- †Dentalium aratum Tate 1887
- †Dentalium arcotinum Forbes 1846
- †Dentalium atratum Tate 1887
- †Dentalium attenuatum Say 1824
- †Dentalium badense Partsch, 1856
- †Dentalium bifrons Tate 1887
- †Dentalium bocasense Olsson 1922
- †Dentalium caduloide Dall 1892
- †Dentalium cannaliculatum Klipstein 1843
- †Dentalium cossmannianum Pilsbry and Sharp 1897
- †Dentalium danai Meyer 1885
- †Dentalium decoratum Münster 1841
- †Dentalium denotatum Ludbrook 1956
- †Dentalium giganteum Sowerby 1846
- †Dentalium gonatodes Martin 1885
- †Dentalium hamatum Forbes 1846
- †Dentalium hanguense Cox 1930
- †Dentalium hecetaensis Rohr et al. 2006
- †Dentalium inaequale Bronn 1831
- †Dentalium indianum Girty 1911
- †Dentalium junghuhni Martin 1879
- †Dentalium kansasense Gentile 1974
- †Dentalium klipsteini Kittl 1891
- †Dentalium latisulcatum Tate 1899
- †Dentalium lombardicum Kittl 1899
- †Dentalium mancorens Olsson 1930
- †Dentalium microstria Heilprin 1880
- †Dentalium montense Briart and Cornet 1889
- †Dentalium moreanum d'Orbigny 1845
- †Dentalium neohexagonum Sharp and Pilsbry 1897
- †Dentalium neornatum Hayasaka 1925
- †Dentalium ovale Cooke 1928
- †Dentalium pseudonyma Pilsbry and Sharp 1898
- †Dentalium rimosum Bose 1906
- †Dentalium rugiferum von Koenen 1885
- †Dentalium sandbergeri Cossmann and Lambert 1884
- †Dentalium schencki Moore 1963
- †Dentalium sexangulum (Gmelin, 1790)
- †Dentalium simile Münster 1841
- †Dentalium solidum Hutton 1873
- †Dentalium sorbii King 1850
- †Dentalium speyeri Geinitz 1852
- †Dentalium sundkrogensis Schnetler 2001
- †Dentalium tenuistriatum Martin 1879
- †Dentalium tornatissimum Tate 1899
- †Dentalium triquetrum Tate 1887
- †Dentalium yasilum Olsson 1930

Fossils in the genus Dentalium are geographically widespread. This genus is very ancient, going back up to the Silurian period (age range: from 422.9 to 0.0 million years ago). It is especially represented in Cretaceous, Eocene and Miocene fossils.

== Gallery ==
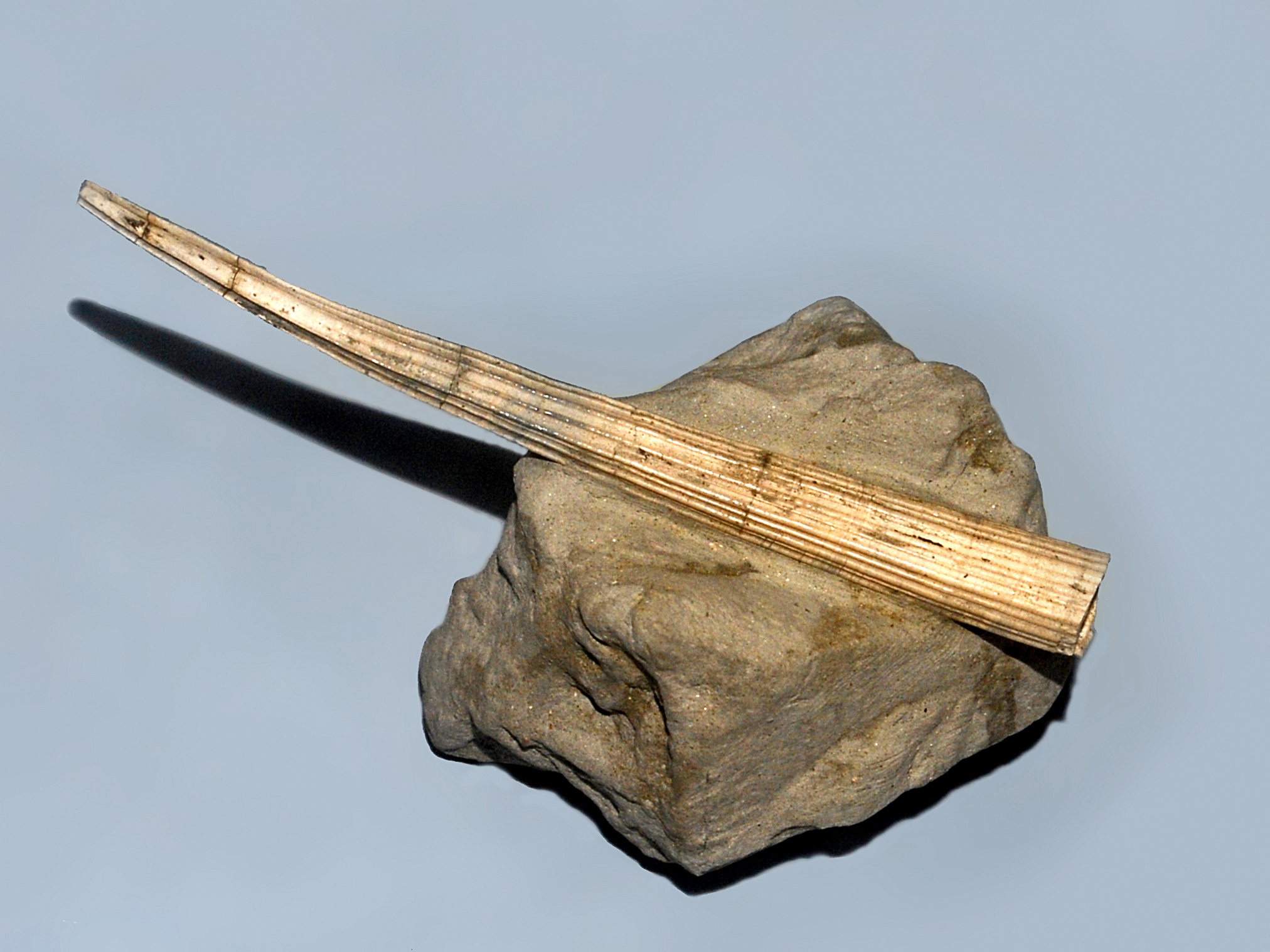
Fossil of Dentalium sexangulum. Pliocene

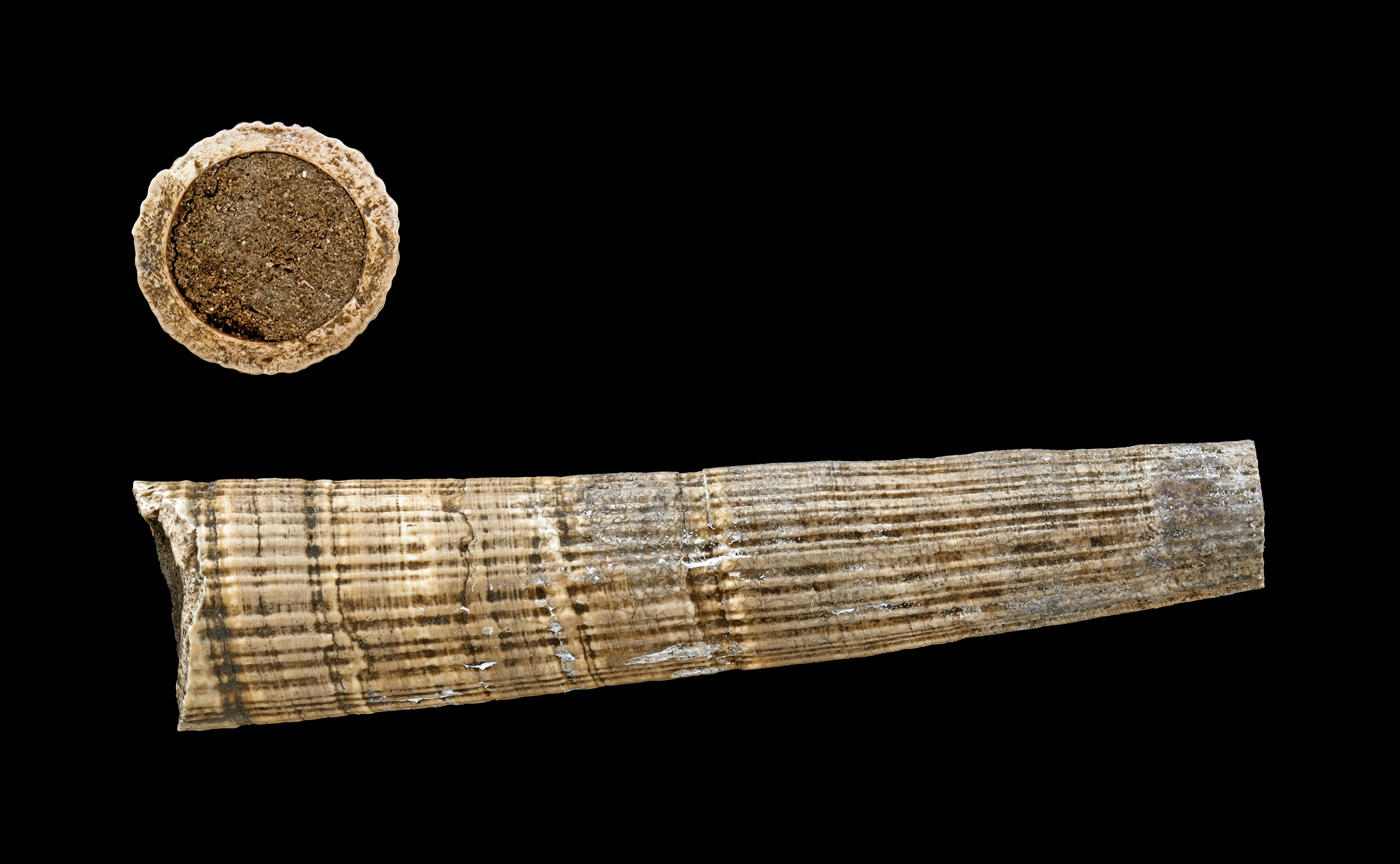
Fossil of Dentalium badense. Miocene

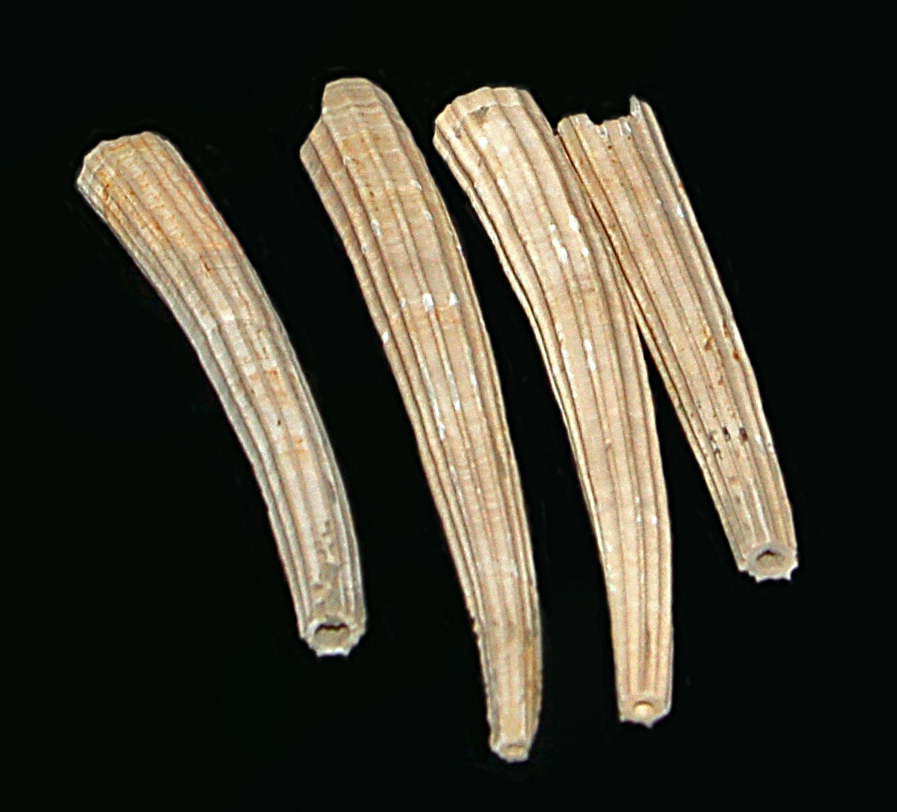
Fossils of Dentalium species. Pliocene

Top: Dentalium entale. Bottom: Dentalium vulgare

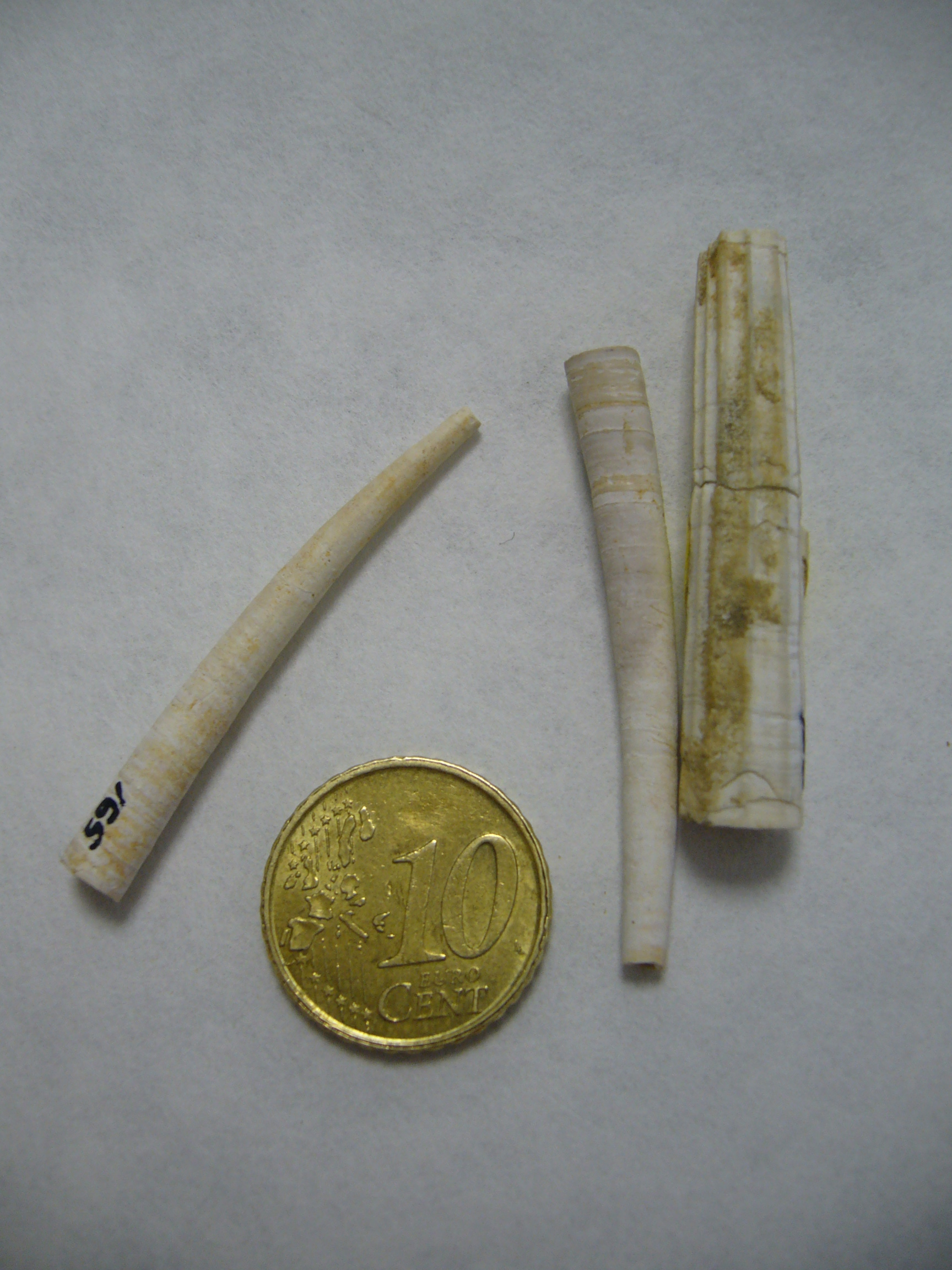
Fossils of Dentalium sp. (Pliocene) founded in Huelva
