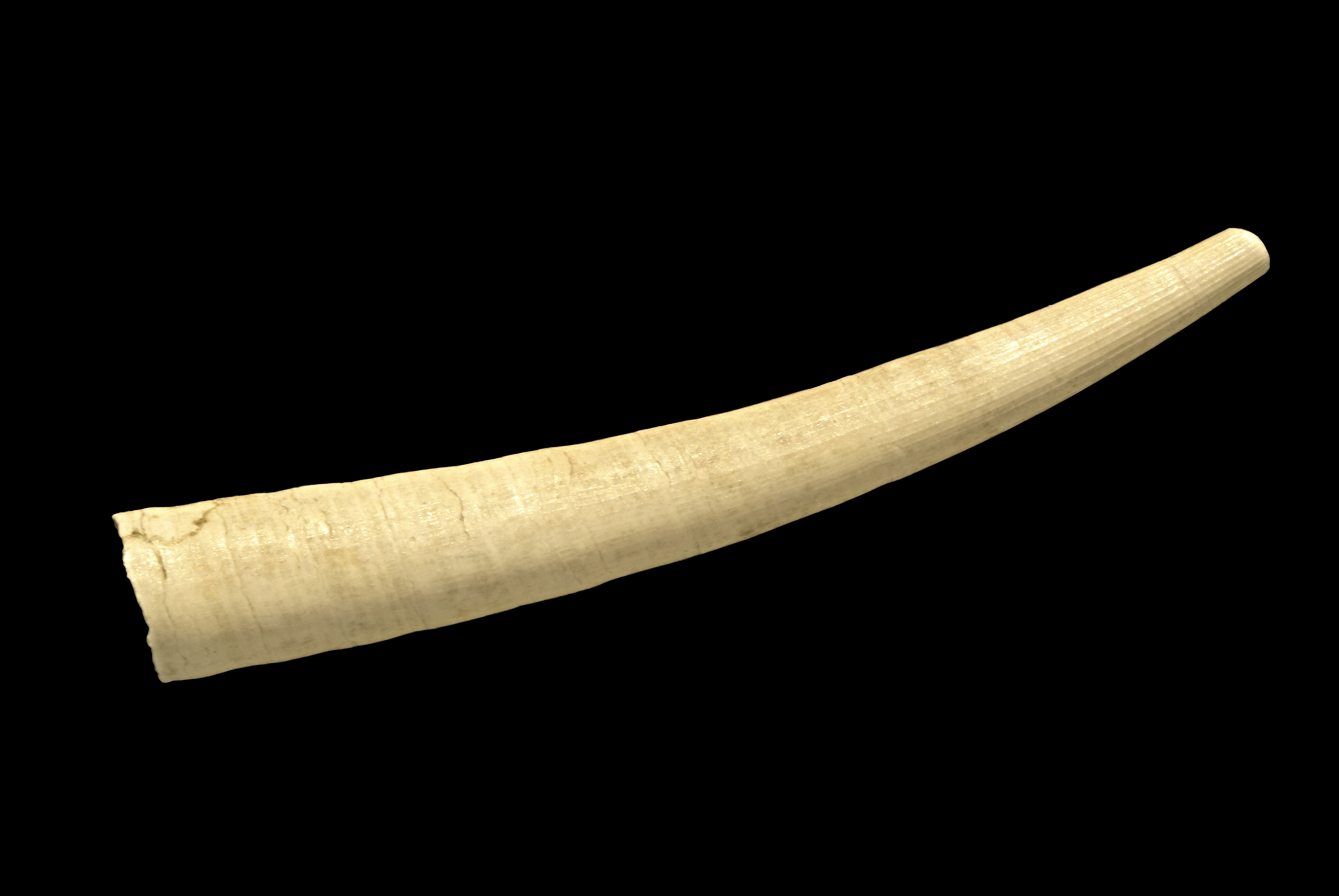
- Shell of Antalis vulgaris

Scientific classification
- Kingdom: Animalia
- Phylum: Mollusca
- Class: Scaphopoda
- Order: Dentaliida
- Family: Dentaliidae
- Genus: Antalis; JH. Adams & A. Adams, 1854

Type species
- Dentalium entalis Linnaeus, 1758

Synonyms
- Dentale da Costa, 1778 (suppressed under ICZN Opinion 361); Dentalium (Antalis) H. Adams & A. Adams, 1854; Dentalium (Entalis) Gray, 1847; Entaliopsis Newton & Harris, 1894; Entalis Gray, 1847 (invalid: junior homonym of Entalis Sowerby, 1839 [Annelida])

= Antalis =

Genus of molluscs

Antalis is a genus of tusk shells, marine scaphopod mollusks.

== Species ==
Species within the genus Antalis include:

- Antalis agilis (M. Sars in G.O. Sars, 1872)
- Antalis albatrossae Scarabino, 2008
- Antalis alis Scarabino, 2008
- Antalis antillaris (d'Orbigny, 1853)
- Antalis ariannae Caprotti, 2015
- Antalis bartletti (Henderson, 1920)
- Antalis berryi (A. G. Smith & Gordon, 1948)
- Antalis boucheti Scarabino, 1995
- Antalis caprottii Martínez-Ortí & Cádiz, 2012
- Antalis cerata (Dall, 1881)
- Antalis circumcincta (R. B. Watson, 1879)
- Antalis dentalis (Linnaeus, 1758)
- Antalis diarrhox (R. B. Watson, 1879)
- Antalis entalis (Linnaeus, 1758)
- Antalis gardineri (Melvill, 1909)
- Antalis glaucarena (Dell, 1953)
- Antalis guillei Scarabino, 1995
- Antalis inaequicostata (Dautzenberg, 1891)
- Antalis inflexa (G. B. Sowerby III, 1903)
- Antalis intesi (Nicklès, 1979)
- Antalis longitrorsa (Reeve, 1842)
- Antalis maestratii Scarabino, 2008
- Antalis marukawai (Otuka, 1933)
- Antalis nana (Hutton, 1873)
- Antalis novemcostata (Lamarck, 1818)
- Antalis occidentalis (Stimpson, 1851)
- Antalis panorma (Chenu, 1843)
- Antalis perinvoluta (Ludbrook, 1954)
- Antalis phanea (Dall, 1895)
- Antalis pilsbryi (Rehder, 1942)
- Antalis porcata (Gould, 1859)
- Antalis pretiosa (Sowerby, 1860)
- Antalis rossati (Caprotti, 1966)
- Antalis senegalensis (Dautzenberg, 1891)
- Antalis suteri (Emerson, 1954)
- Antalis taphria (Dall, 1889)
- Antalis tibana (Nomura, 1940)
- Antalis tubulata (Henderson, 1920)
- Antalis usitata (E. A. Smith, 1894)
- Antalis valdiviae (Plate, 1908)
- Antalis vulgaris (da Costa, 1778)
- Antalis weinkauffi (Dunker, 1877)

Extinct species

- Antalis nanaimoense (extinct/fossil)
- Antalis cooprei (extinct/fossil)

Taxon inquirendum

- Antalis aculeata (Sowerby, 1860)

Species brought into synonymy

- Antalis boissevainae Palmer, 1974 accepted as Antalis tibana (Nomura, 1940)
- Antalis callithrix (Dall, 1889) accepted as Pertusiconcha callithrix (Dall, 1889) (currently placed in genus Pertusiconcha)
- Antalis disparile (d'Orbigny, 1853) accepted as Paradentalium disparile (d'Orbigny, 1853)
- Antalis entale Linnaeus, 1758 accepted as Antalis entalis (Linnaeus, 1758) (wrong grammatical agreement of epithet)
- Antalis infracta (Odhner, 1931) accepted as Paradentalium infractum (Odhner, 1931)
- Antalis occidentale (Stimpson, 1851) accepted as Antalis occidentalis (Stimpson, 1851)
- Antalis vulgare (da Costa, 1778) accepted as Antalis vulgaris (da Costa, 1778) (Spelling variation)
