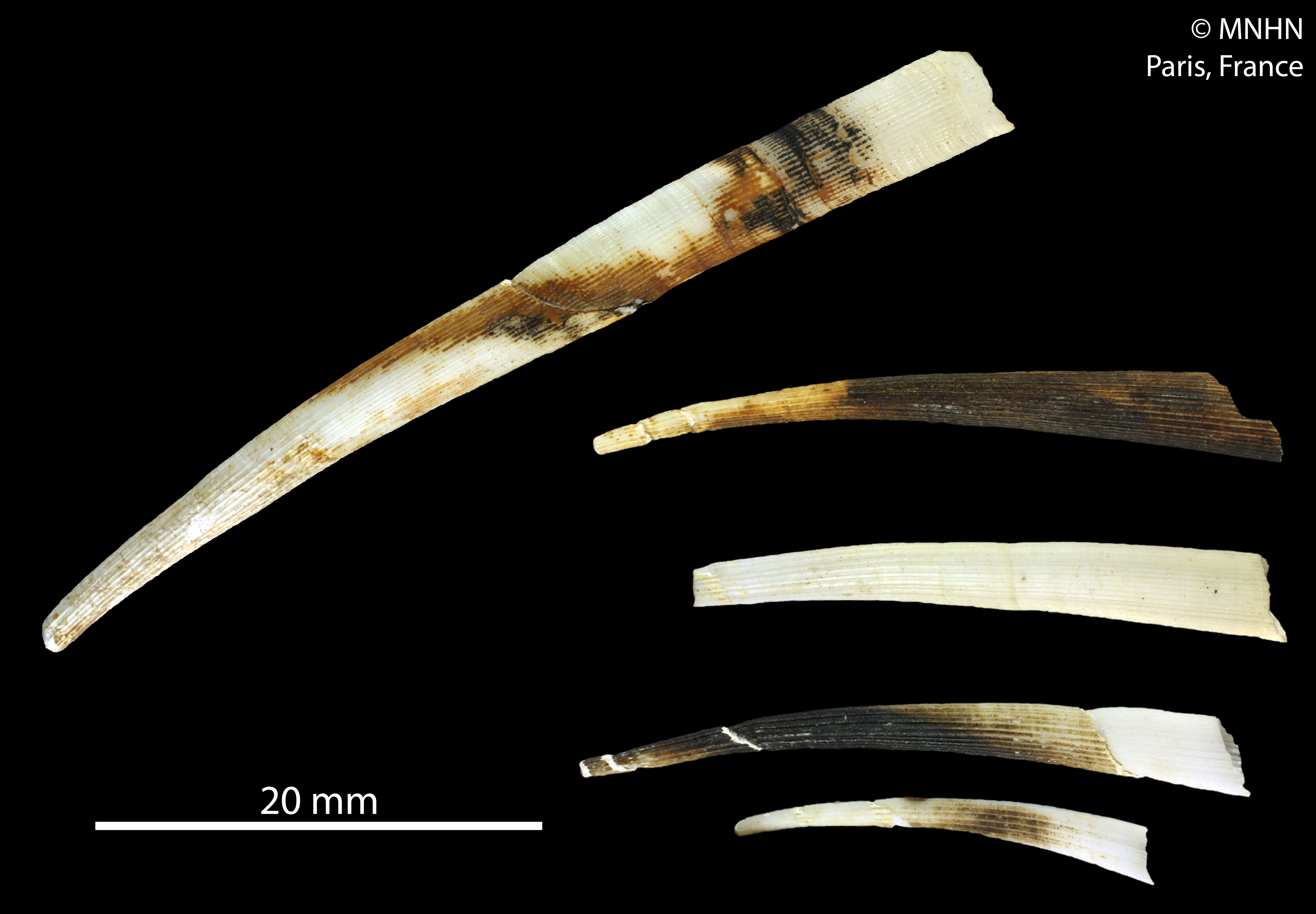
- Shell of Compressidentalium compressiusculum (specimen at MNHN, Paris)

Scientific classification
- Kingdom: Animalia
- Phylum: Mollusca
- Class: Scaphopoda
- Order: Dentaliida
- Family: Dentaliidae
- Genus: Compressidentalium; Habe, 1963

Type species
- Compressidentalium hungerfordi (Pilsbry & Sharp, 1897)

Synonyms
- Fissidentalium (Compressidentalium) Habe, 1963

= Compressidentalium =

Genus of molluscs

Compressidentalium is a genus of tusk shells, marine scaphopod mollusks.

== Species ==
Species within the genus Compressidentalium include:

- Compressidentalium ceciliae Scarabino, 1995
- Compressidentalium clathratum (Martens, 1881)
- Compressidentalium compressiusculum (Boissevain, 1906)
- Compressidentalium harasewychi Scarabino, 2008
- Compressidentalium hungerfordi (Pilsbry & Sharp, 1897)
- Compressidentalium lardum (Barnard, 1963)
- Compressidentalium legoffi Scarabino, 2008
- Compressidentalium pseudohungerfordi (Sahlmann, van der Beek & Wiese, 2016)
- Compressidentalium sedecimcostatum (Boissevain, 1906)
- Compressidentalium sibogae (Boissevain, 1906)
- Compressidentalium subcurvatum (E. A. Smith, 1906)
- Compressidentalium sumatrense (Plate, 1908)
- Compressidentalium zanzibarense (Plate, 1908)
