= D. gouldii =

D. gouldii may refer to:

- Dendrobium gouldii, an orchid species in the genus Dendrobium
- Dentalium gouldii, the Gould tuskshell, a mollusc species
- Donax gouldii, the bean clam, a species found on the Pacific coast of North America

== See also ==
- Gouldii (disambiguation)
