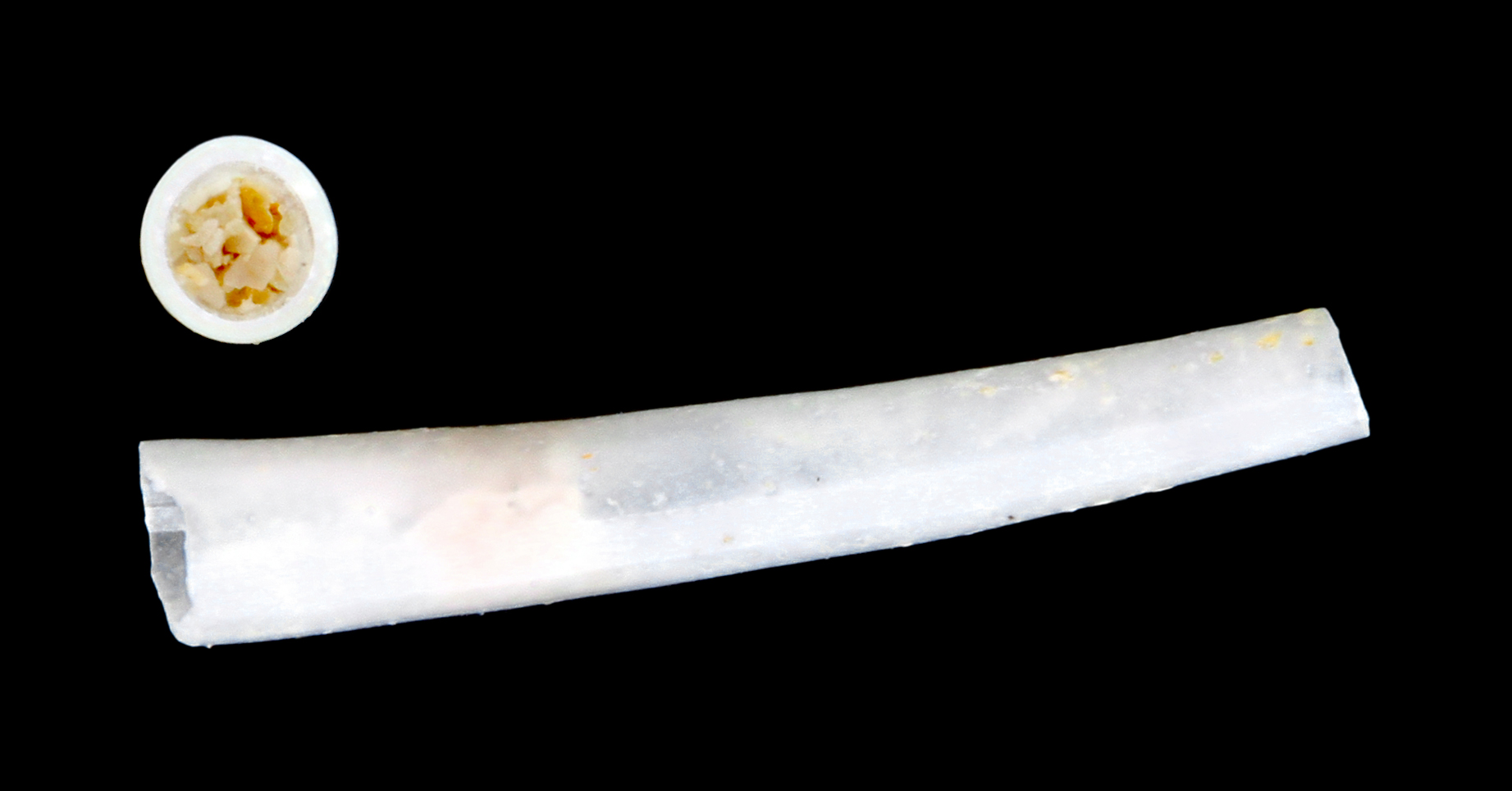
- Fustiaria subeburnea

Scientific classification
- Kingdom: Animalia
- Phylum: Mollusca
- Class: Scaphopoda
- Order: Dentaliida
- Family: Fustiariidae; Steiner, 1991
- Genus: Fustiaria; Stoliczka, 1868

Species
- See text

Synonyms
- Dentalium (Fustiaria) Stoliczka, 1868; Dentalium (Pseudantalis) Monterosato, 1884; Pseudantalis Monterosato, 1884

= Fustiaria =

Genus of molluscs

Fustiaria is a genus of scaphopods in the order Dentaliida and is the only genus comprising the family Fustiariidae, with 24 species.

== Description ==
The shells of Fustiaria are characterized as smooth, slender, circular in cross section, slightly curved, thin-walled, and virtually transparent. The central tooth of its radula (chewing organ), called a "rachis", is unusual compared with that of other Dentaliids in that it is flat on its tip rather than pointed. The space around the foot (the "pedal sinus") is divided by a thin horizontal membrane called a septum.

== Species ==
- Fustiaria caesura (Colman, 1958)
- Fustiaria crosnieri Nicklès, 1979
- Fustiaria diaphana V. Scarabino & F. Scarabino, 2010
- Fustiaria electra V. Scarabino & F. Scarabino, 2010
- Fustiaria engischista (Barnard, 1963)
- Fustiaria gruveli (Dautzenberg, 1910)
- Fustiaria langfordi (Habe, 1963)
- Fustiaria liodon (Pilsbry & Sharp, 1897)
- † Fustiaria maoria P. A. Maxwell, 1992
- Fustiaria mariae Scarabino, 2008
- Fustiaria nipponica (Yokoyama, 1922)
- Fustiaria polita (Linnaeus, 1767)
- Fustiaria rubescens (Deshayes, 1826)
- Fustiaria steineri V. Scarabino, 2008
- Fustiaria stenoschiza (Pilsbry & Sharp, 1897)
- Fustiaria tenuifissum (Pilsbry & Sharp, 1897) (taxon inquirendum)
- Fustiaria vagina Scarabino, 1995

Species brought into synonymy

- Fustiaria aequatoria (Pilsbry & Sharp, 1897) : synonym of Rhabdus aequatorius (Pilsbry & Sharp, 1897)
- Fustiaria brevicornu (Pilsbry & Sharp, 1897) : synonym of Compressidens brevicornu (Sharp & Pilsbry, 1897)
- Fustiaria dalli (Pilsbry & Sharp, 1897) : synonym of Rhabdus dalli (Pilsbry & Sharp, 1897): synonym of Rhabdus rectius (Carpenter, 1864)
- Fustiaria innumerabilis (Pilsbry & Sharp, 1897) : synonym of Episiphon innumerabile (Pilsbry & Sharp, 1897)
- Fustiaria splendida (G.B. Sowerby I, 1832) : synonym of Graptacme splendida (G. B. Sowerby I, 1832)
