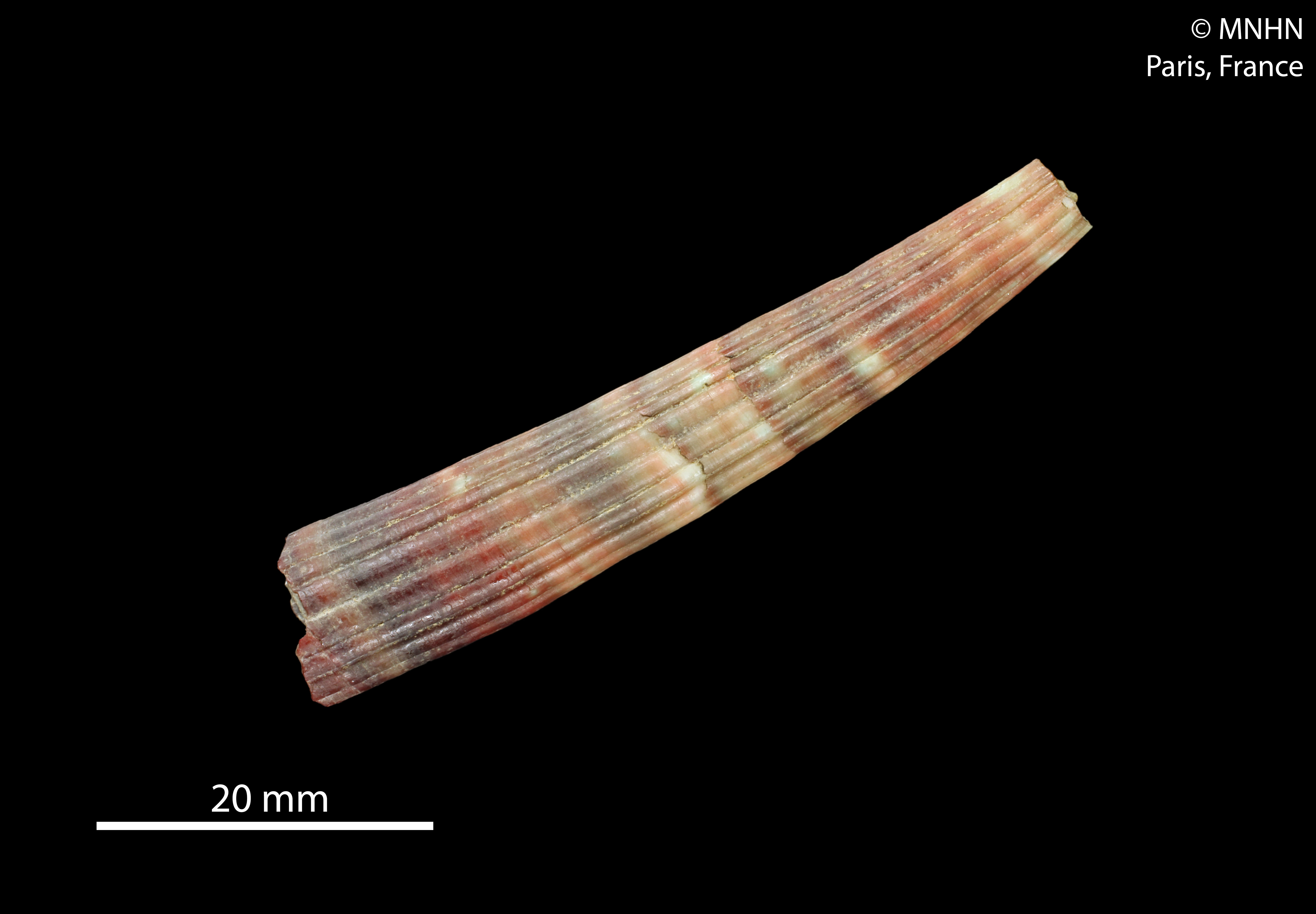
- Shell of Pictodentalium formosum (specimen at MNHN, Paris)

Scientific classification
- Domain: Eukaryota
- Kingdom: Animalia
- Phylum: Mollusca
- Class: Scaphopoda
- Order: Dentaliida
- Family: Dentaliidae
- Genus: Pictodentalium; Habe, 1963

Synonyms
- Dentalium (Pictodentalium) (Habe, 1963; Fissidentalium (Pictodentalium) (Habe, 1963

= Pictodentalium =

Genus of molluscs

Pictodentalium is a genus of molluscs belonging to the family Dentaliidae.

== Species ==
- Pictodentalium festivum (G. B. Sowerby III, 1914)
- Pictodentalium formosum (A. Adams & Reeve, 1850)
- Pictodentalium vernedei (Hanley in G. B. Sowerby II, 1860)
