= Omniglypta =

Scientific classification
- Kingdom: Animalia
- Phylum: Mollusca
- Class: Scaphopoda
- Order: Dentaliida
- Family: Omniglyptidae; Chistikov, 1975
- Genus: Omniglypta; Pilsbry, 1905
- Species: O. cerina

Binomial name
- Omniglypta cerina (Pilsbry, 1905)

Genus of molluscs

Omniglypta is a monotypic genus of molluscs belonging to the monotypic family Omniglyptidae. The only species is Omniglypta cerina.

The species is found in Japan.
