= Pinnocaris =

Pinnocaris Temporal range: Ordovician

Scientific classification
- Domain: Eukaryota
- Kingdom: Animalia
- Phylum: Mollusca
- Class: †Rostroconchia
- Order: †Ribeirioida
- Genus: †Pinnocaris; Etheridge, 1878

Extinct genus of molluscs

Pinnocaris is a genus of rostroconch mollusc known from the Cambro-Ordovician. It was once considered as a possible ancestor to the scaphopods, but this no longer seems tenable. Original descriptions from material in southern Scotland had the organism as a bivalved arthropod, but its univalved disposition has since become clear.
