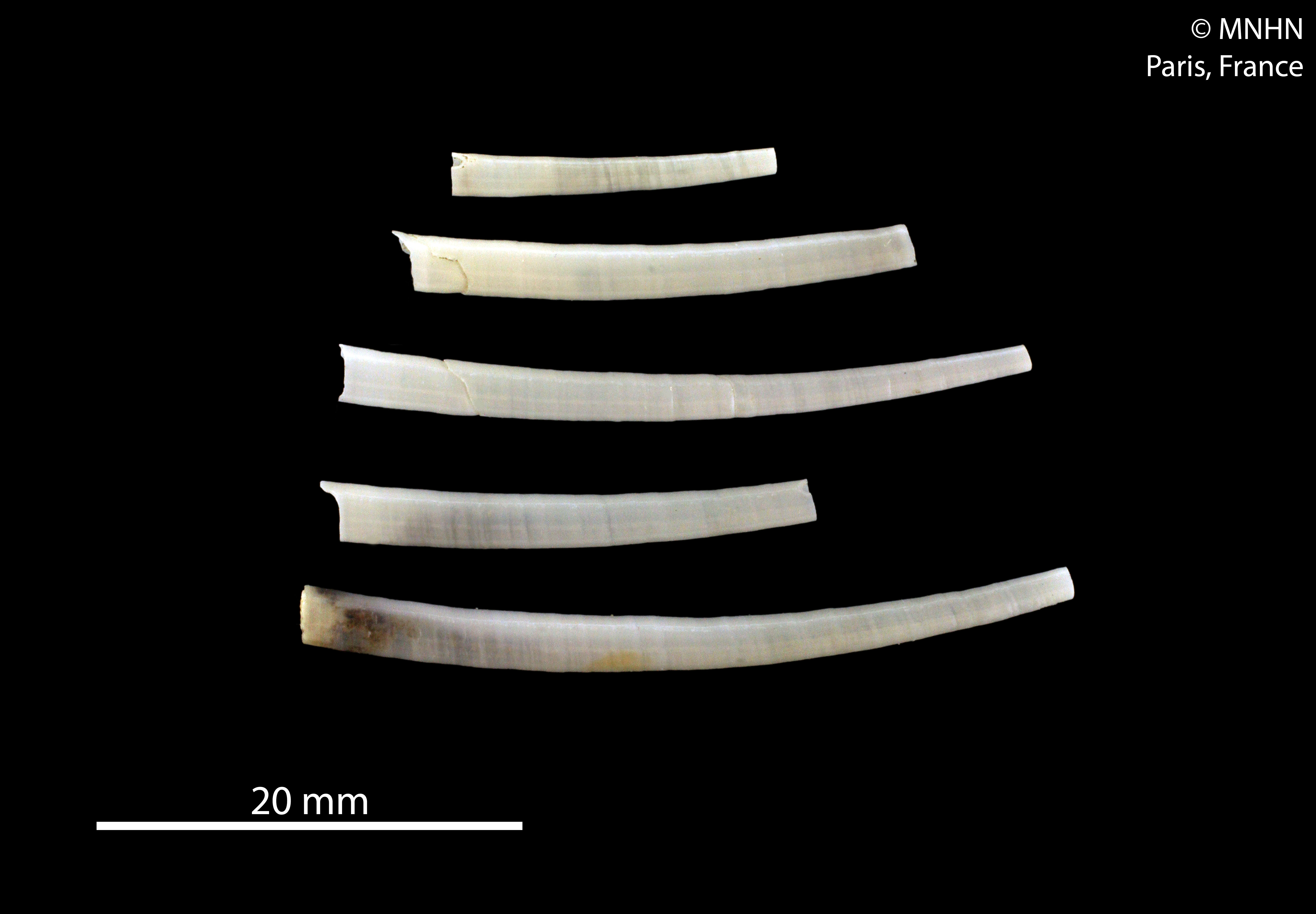
- Shell of Laevidentalium coruscum (specimen at MNHN, Paris)

Scientific classification
- Kingdom: Animalia
- Phylum: Mollusca
- Subphylum: Conchifera
- Class: Scaphopoda
- Order: Dentaliida
- Family: Laevidentaliidae; Palmer, 1974

Genera
- See text

= Laevidentaliidae =

Family of molluscs

Laevidentaliidae is a family of relatively large tusk shells, scaphopod mollusks in the order Dentaliida.

== Genera ==
- Laevidentalium Cossmann, 1888
