= Rhabdus =

- Rhabdus rectius

Scientific classification
- Kingdom: Animalia
- Phylum: Mollusca
- Class: Scaphopoda
- Order: Dentaliida
- Family: Rhabdidae; Chistikov 1975
- Genus: Rhabdus; Pilsbry & Sharp, 1897

Genus of molluscs

The Rhabdidae are scaphopod members of the same molluscan family, belonging to the order Dentaliida. It includes only one genus, Rhabdus, and five species, as follows:

- Rhabdus aequatorius (Pilsbry & Sharp, 1897)
- Rhabdus dalli (Pilsbry & Sharp, 1897)
- Rhabdus perceptus (Mabille & Rochebrune, 1889)
- Rhabdus rectius (Carpenter, 1864)
- Rhabdus toyamaense (Kuroda & Kikuchi, 1933)
