= Rhabdus rectius =

Scientific classification
- Domain: Eukaryota
- Kingdom: Animalia
- Phylum: Mollusca
- Class: Scaphopoda
- Order: Dentaliida
- Family: Rhabdidae
- Genus: Rhabdus
- Species: R. rectius

Binomial name
- Rhabdus rectius Carpenter, 1864

Species of mollusc

Rhabdus rectius, also known as a straight tusk shell, is a species of scaphopod, a small marine mollusc native to the coast of central California whose shell, like that of all the members of its order, resembles a tusk. Most members of the scaphopoda have shells that exhibit a noticeable and characteristic anterior curvature— the shell of R. rectius, however, is unusually straight, hence the Latin word "rectius" (literally, "straight") in its binomial designation. R. rectius is a generalist carnivore found in shallow silty and sandy substrates. Aside from the usual diet of foraminiferans, it also eats sediment and fecal pellets. Its thin, straight shell becomes fragile when dehydrated. Some adult specimens are more than 10 centimetres (3.9 in) long, and have a maximum diameter of about 6 mm.
