= Ronald Shimek =

American marine biologist

Ronald L. Shimek (born March 28, 1948) is an American marine biologist specializing in the study of scaphopods and turrid gastropods. His current work is on marine reef aquaria and is targeted at the reef keeping hobbyist community.

== Academic history ==
Shimek received his doctorate from the University of Washington in 1977, becoming Assistant Professor of Biology at the University of Alaska, Anchorage the same year. In 1979 he served as the Department Chair. In 1983 he became Assistant Director of the Bamfield Marine Station on Vancouver Island in British Columbia, and in 1988 became a senior postdoctoral fellow at the Harbor Branch Oceanographic Institution in Florida. In 2000 he was voted president of the Western Society of Malacologists, and between 1996 and 2003 he was an Affiliate Associate Professor of Ecology at Montana State University, retiring from there in 2003.

== Research ==
Shimek's knowledge of marine invertebrates resulted in his publication of a pocket guide in 2001 and a follow-up in 2005 which was favorably reviewed.
