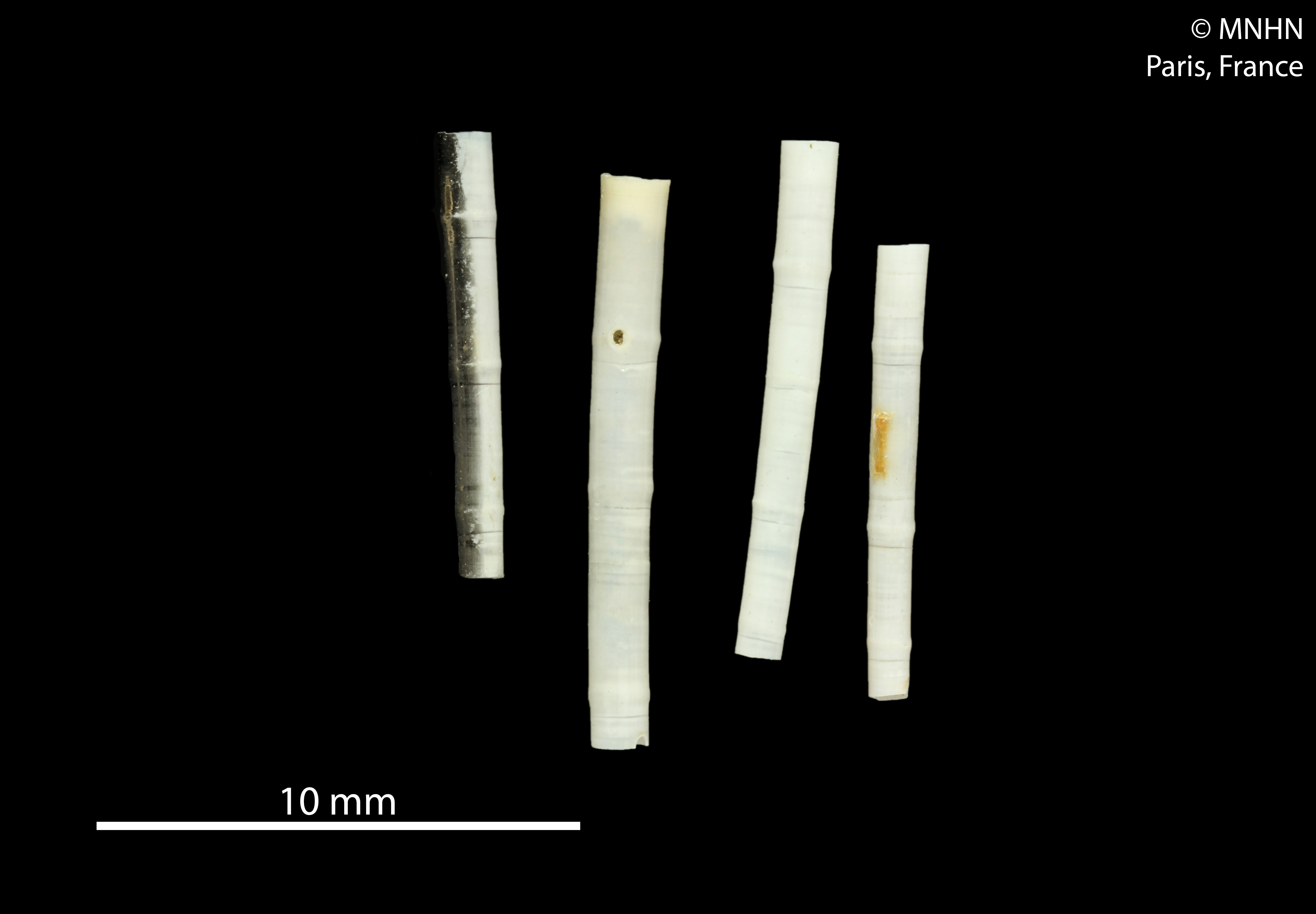
- Anulidentalium bambusa

Scientific classification
- Domain: Eukaryota
- Kingdom: Animalia
- Phylum: Mollusca
- Class: Scaphopoda
- Order: Dentaliida
- Family: Anulidentaliidae; Chistikov, 1975

= Anulidentaliidae =

Family of molluscs

Anulidentaliidae is a family of molluscs belonging to the order Dentaliida.

Genera:

- Anulidentalium Chistikov, 1975
- Epirhabdoides Steiner, 1999
