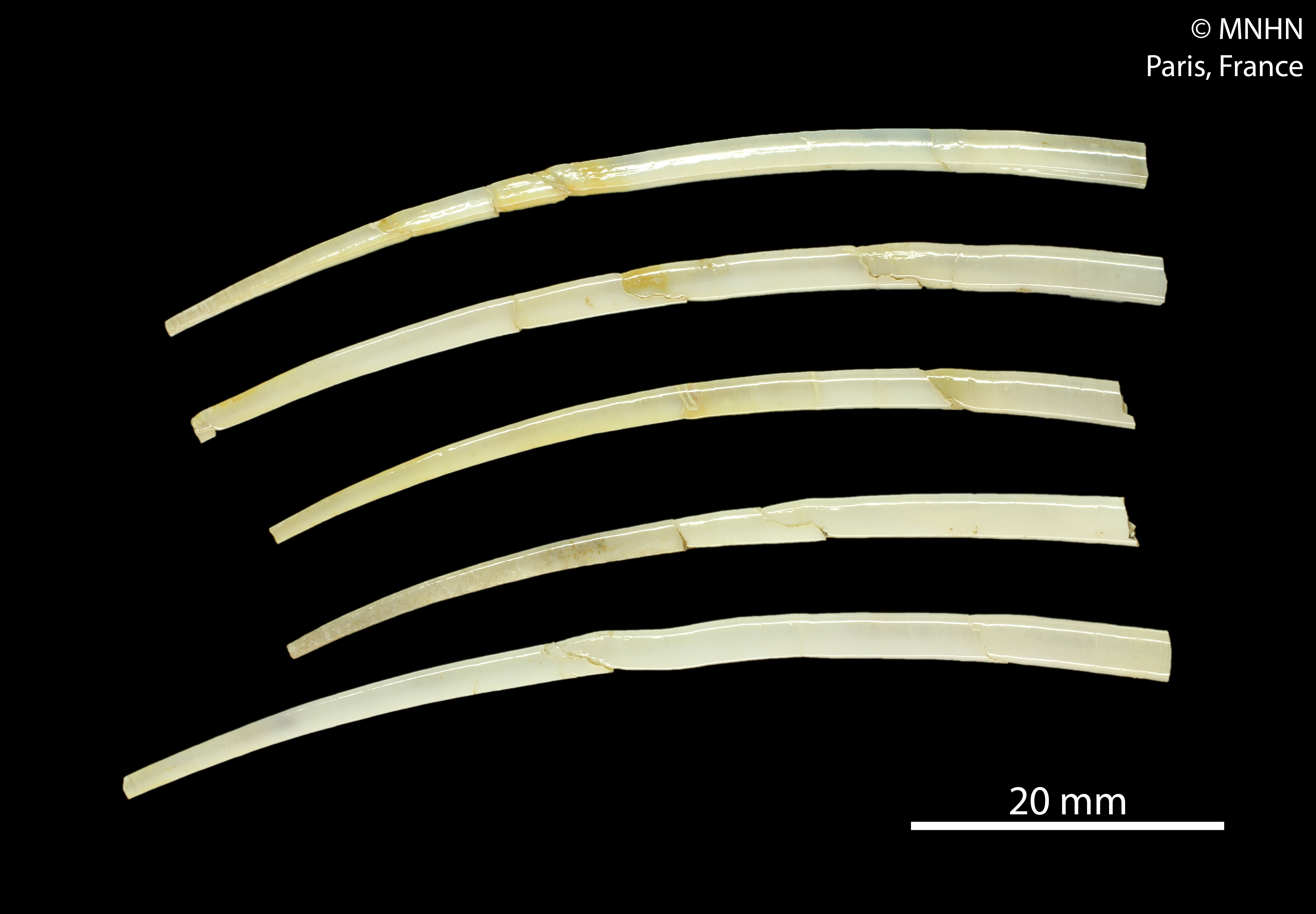
- Shell of Gadilina insolita (specimen at MNHN, Paris)

Scientific classification
- Kingdom: Animalia
- Phylum: Mollusca
- Subphylum: Conchifera
- Class: Scaphopoda
- Order: Dentaliida
- Family: Gadilinidae; Chistikov, 1975

Genera
- See text

= Gadilinidae =

Family of molluscs

Gadilinidae is a family of relatively large tusk shells, scaphopod mollusks in the order Dentaliida.

== Genera ==
- Episiphon Pilsbry & Sharp, 1897
- Gadilina Foresti, 1895
- † Lobantale Cossmann, 1888
