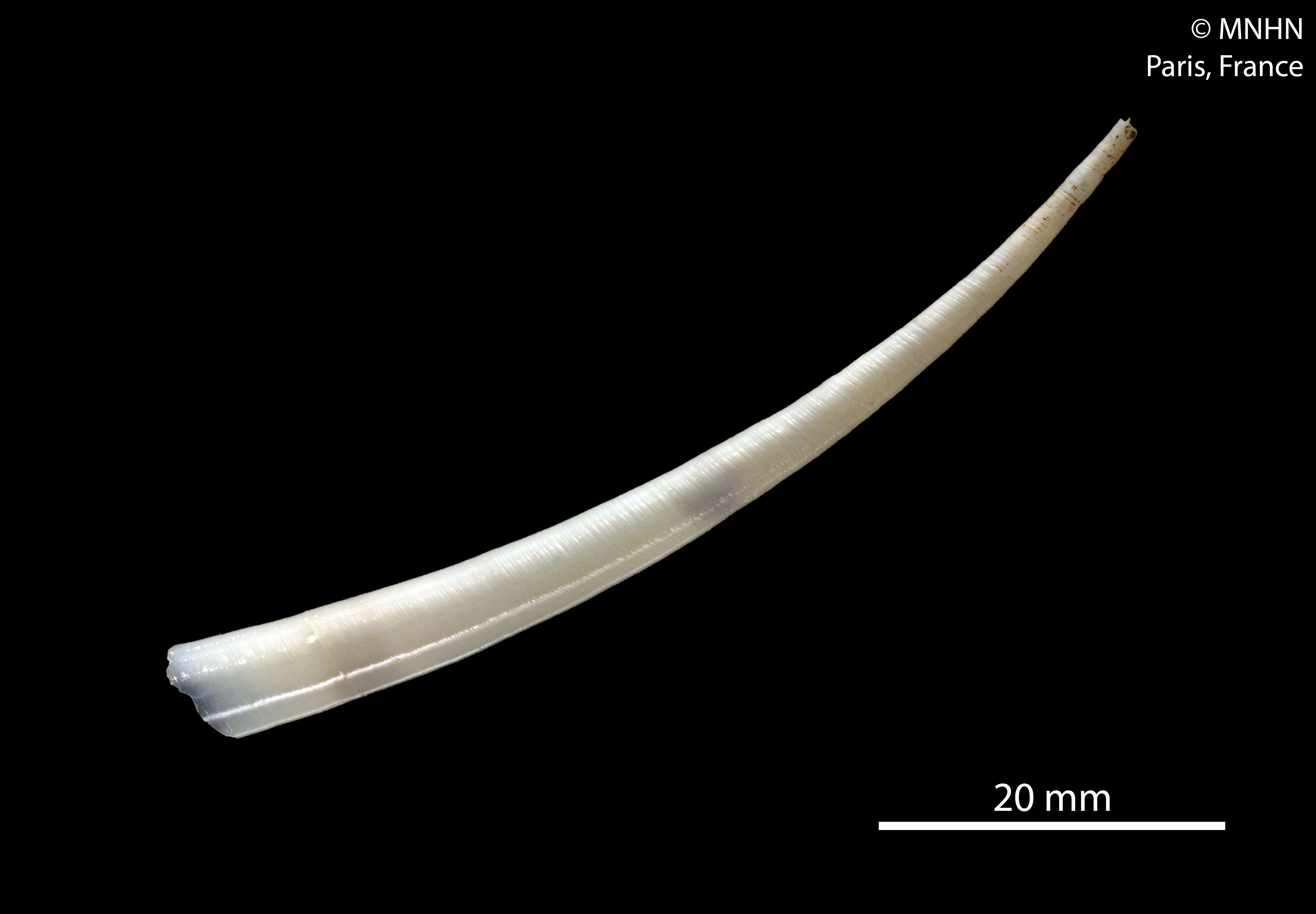
- Calliodentalium semitracheatum

Scientific classification
- Domain: Eukaryota
- Kingdom: Animalia
- Phylum: Mollusca
- Class: Scaphopoda
- Order: Dentaliida
- Family: Calliodentaliidae; Chistikov, 1975
- Genus: Calliodentalium; Habe, 1964

= Calliodentalium =

Genus of molluscs

Calliodentalium is a genus of scaphopodan molluscs. It is monotypic within the family Calliodentaliidae. It is known from the Atlantic, Indian, and Pacific Oceans.

== Species ==
There are four species:

- Calliodentalium balanoides (Plate, 1908)
- Calliodentalium callipeplum (Dall, 1889)
- Calliodentalium crocinum (Dall, 1907)
- Calliodentalium semitracheatum (Boissevain, 1906)
