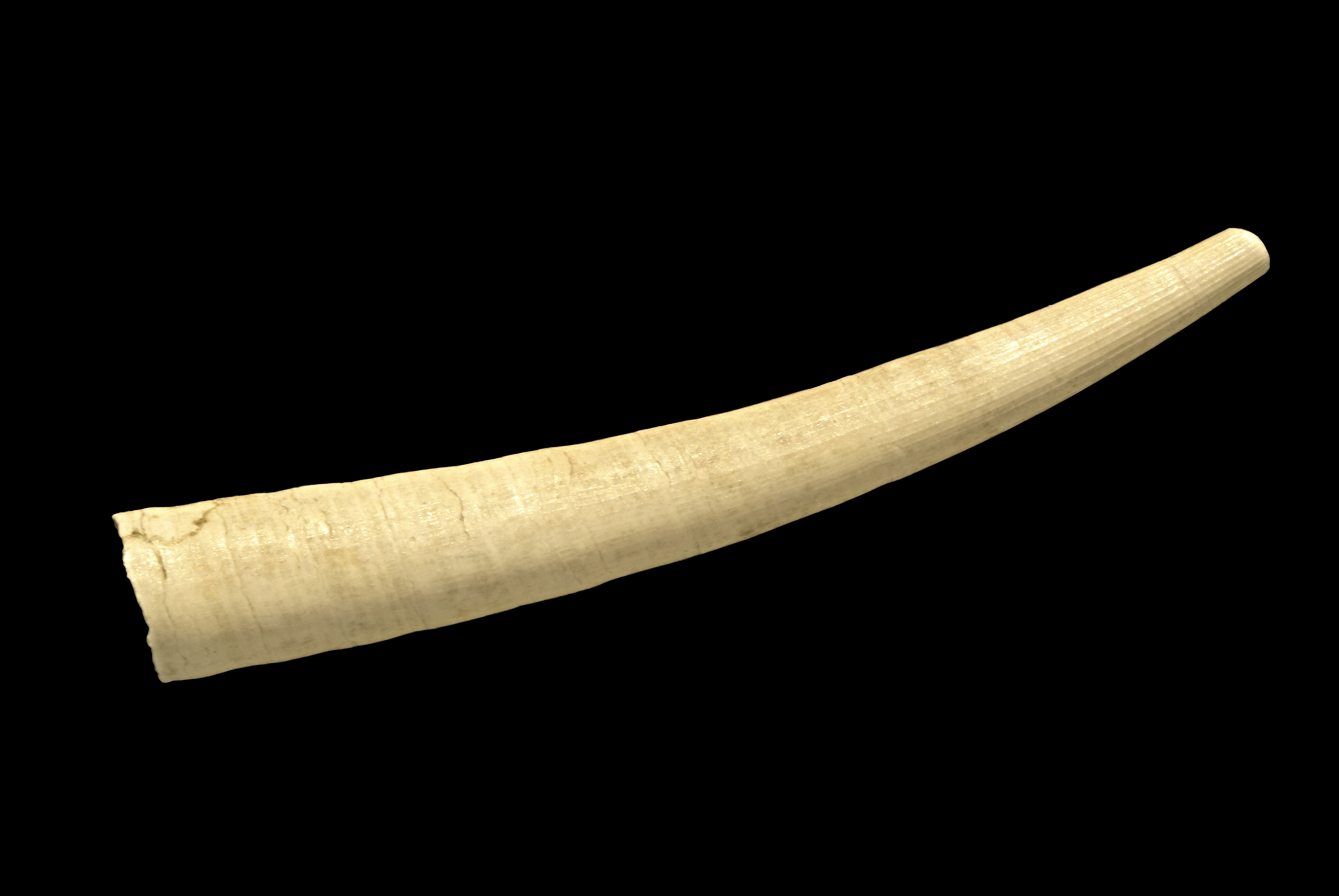
- Antalis vulgaris

Scientific classification
- Kingdom: Animalia
- Phylum: Mollusca
- Class: Scaphopoda
- Order: Dentaliida
- Family: Dentaliidae; Children, 1834

Genera
- See text

= Dentaliidae =

Family of molluscs

Dentaliidae is a family of relatively large tusk shells, scaphopod mollusks in the order Dentaliida.

== Genera ==
- Antalis H. & A. Adams, 1854
- Coccodentalium Sacco, 1896
- Compressidentalium Habe, 1963
- Dentalium Linnaeus, 1758
- Eudentalium Cotton & Godfrey, 1933
- Fissidentalium Fischer, 1885
- Graptacme Pilsbry & Sharp, 1897
- Paradentalium Cotton & Godfrey, 1933
- Pictodentalium Palmer, 1974
- Plagioglypta Pilsbry in Pilsbry & Sharp, 1897
- Schizodentalium Sowerby, 1894
- Striodentalium Habe, 1964
- Tesseracme Pilsbry & Sharp, 1897
