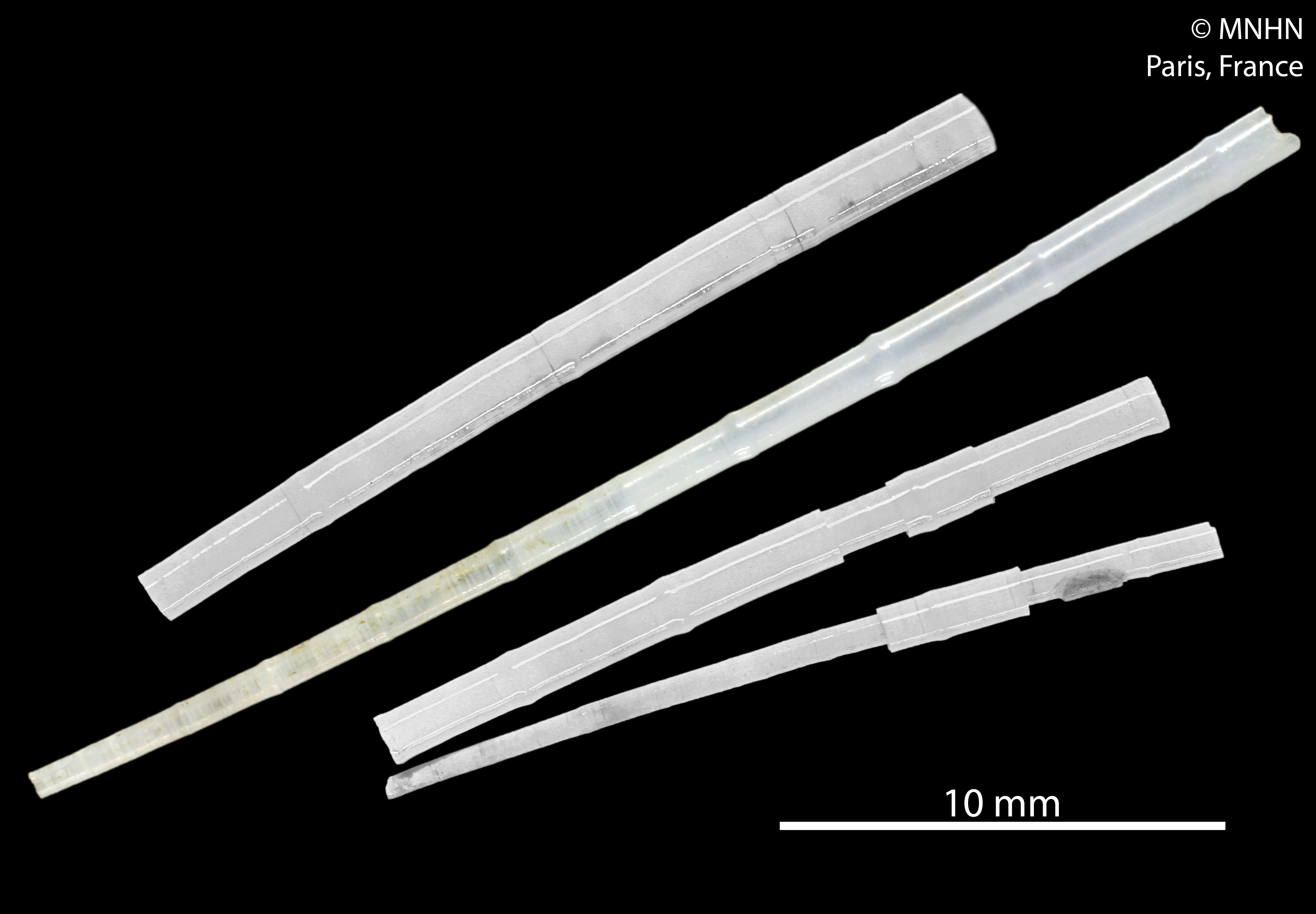

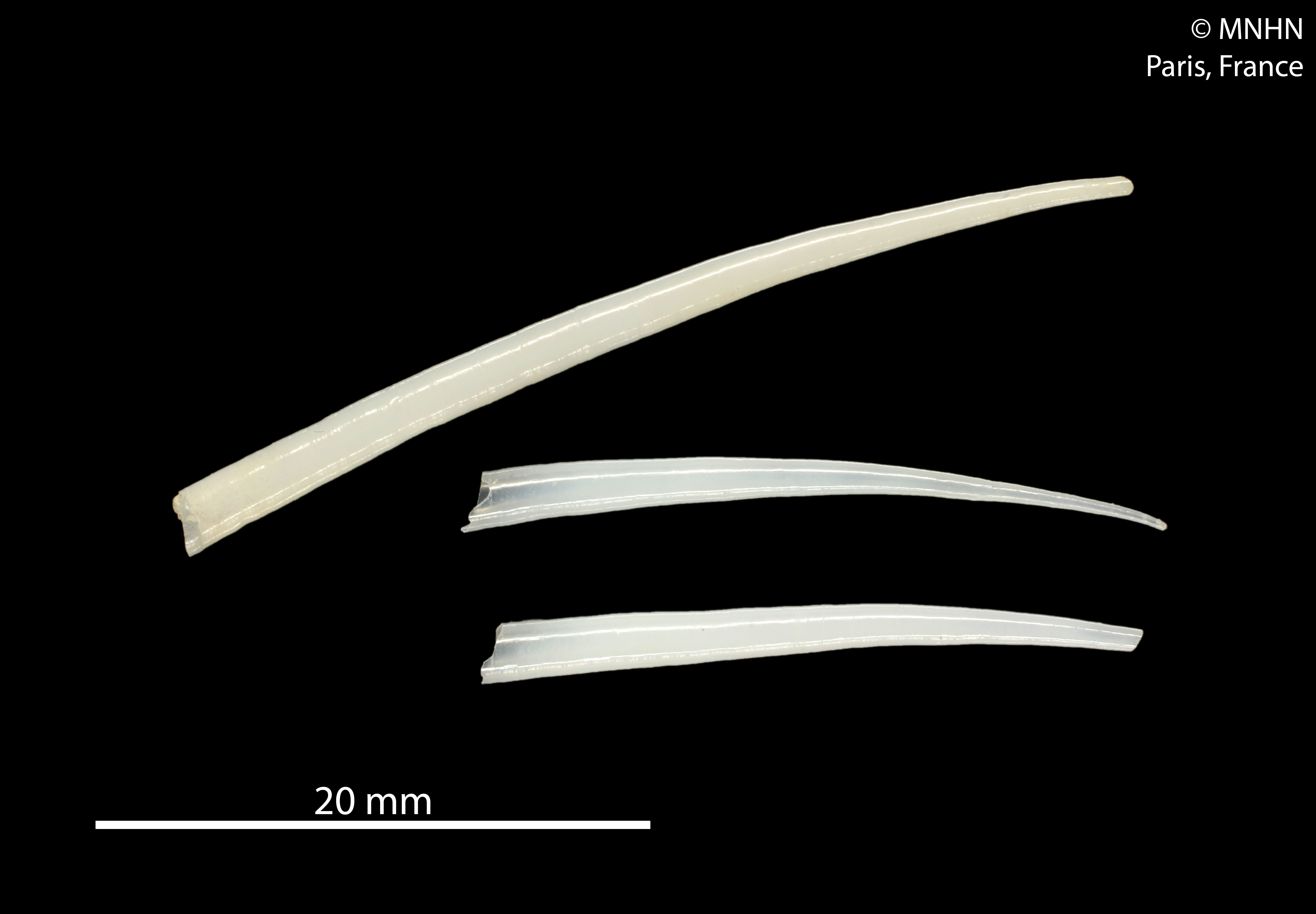
- Top: Anulidentalium bambusa, Bottom: Fustiaria langfordi

Scientific classification
- Domain: Eukaryota
- Kingdom: Animalia
- Phylum: Mollusca
- Class: Scaphopoda
- Order: Dentaliida; Starobogatov, 1974

Families
- 8 (see text)

= Dentaliida =

Dentaliida Temporal range: Tournaisian–Recent

Order of molluscs

Dentaliida is one of the two orders of scaphopod mollusks, commonly known as elephant's tusk shells. The order Dentaliida contains most of the larger scaphopods, and is distinguished from the other order (the Gadilidae) by the shape of its shell (the dentaliid shell tapers uniformly from anterior to posterior; the gadilid one has an anterior shell opening slightly smaller than the shell's widest point), the shape of the foot (the dentaliid foot is boat-shaped with a central trough; the gadilid foot is star-shaped), and the arrangement of some of their internal organs.

== Families ==
The order contains eight families:

- Anulidentaliidae
- Calliodentaliidae
- Dentaliidae
- Fustiariidae
- Gadilinidae
- Laevidentaliidae
- Omniglyptidae
- Rhabdidae
