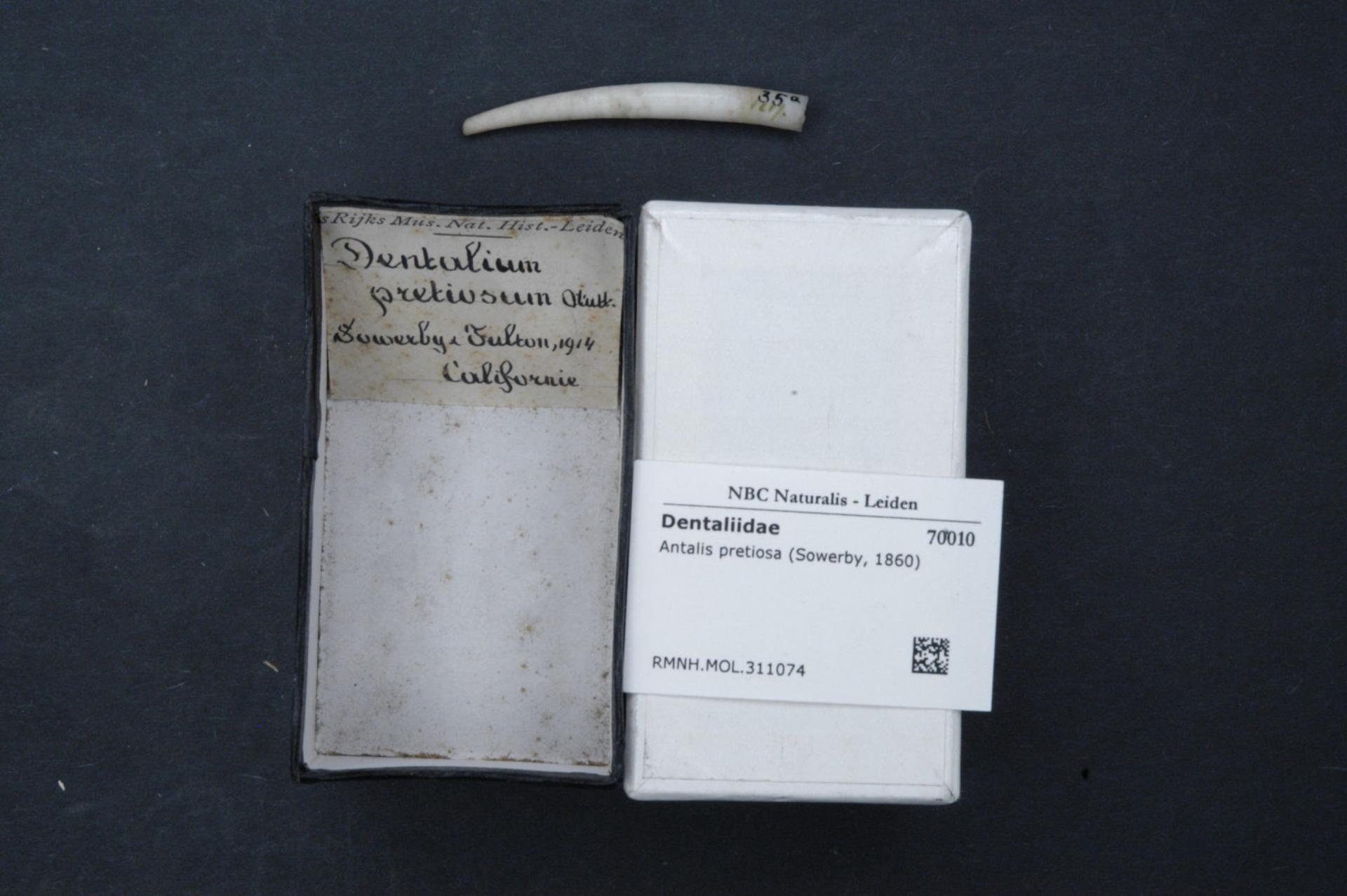

Scientific classification
- Kingdom: Animalia
- Phylum: Mollusca
- Class: Scaphopoda
- Order: Dentaliida
- Family: Dentaliidae
- Genus: Antalis
- Species: A. pretiosa

Binomial name
- Antalis pretiosa (G. B. Sowerby II, 1860)

Synonyms
- Dentalium pretiosum G.B.Sowerby II, 1860; Dentalium indianorum Carpenter, 1864

= Antalis pretiosa =

Species of mollusc

Antalis pretiosa (formerly Dentalium pretiosum), commonly known as the Wampum tuskshell or the Indian money tusk is a species of tusk shell in the family Dentaliidae. It was first described by George Brettingham Sowerby II, and named by Thomas Nuttall in 1860.

Antalis pretiosa is the primary species of shell known by the colloquial term dentalium, (Note: When dealing with historic and ethnographic sources, the term "dentalium" primarily refers to A. pretiosa but can cause confusion due to the clash in generic epiphets. R.B. Clark identified three species referred to with the term "dentalium" and used as shell money and regalia by Indigenous peoples. D. pretiosum (now Antalis pretiosa), D. neohexagonum, and D. entalis (now Antalis entalis). All sources noted here explicitly refer to A. pretiosa by name or by its synonym. Of the three species, Clark notes that D. neohexagonum was only found in strings on San Miguel Island, while A. entalis never existed in the trade prior to colonization and was never collected by Indigenous peoples. A. entalis was only collected after European traders noted the value of the shells and flooded the market with shells collected from the East Coast, which was identified as A. entalis.) a blanket term describing tusk shells utilized extensively for over 2500 years by Indigenous peoples for both regalia and currency. The shells were referred to as Hy'kwa (also haiqua (Note: Galois and Mackie note alternative spellings as such: Hiqu (Magee 1793), Ife-waw (Jewitt 1803-1805), Hyaqua (Scouler 1825), Hy-a-quoi (McLeod 1826), Jye Quoise (McLeod 1826), Hioquois (McLoughlin 1826), Hyequa (Ogden 1827), Hiaquas (A. Simpson 1828), Hyaquau (Cox 1831), Hyaquas (McLoughlin 1835), Hayaquois (McLoughlin 1835), Hay-quois (Douglas 1839), Hy-qua (Douglas 1845), Howqua (Swan 1857), Hai-qua (Mayne 1862).)) in the Chinook Jargon trade language. Trade networks carried A. pretiosa shells far beyond the Vancouver Island sites where the shells were harvested, into the Great Lakes region and as far south as Baja California.

== Description ==
The wampum tuskshell has a narrow, tubular shell. Bill Merrilees describes the shell as a "sturdy attractive shell" that resembles a miniaturized elephant tusk. The shell consists of aragonite. Its length ranges between 3.6–7.5 centimetres (1.4–3.0 in), Adults are blind. Abbott (1974) notes an average length between 51–55 millimetres (2.0–2.2 in). Adults are motile, locomotion for the adult is primarily done through the "foot". The foot is used to orient the animal within the sediment and bury it.

== Uses by humans ==
Dentalium adornments

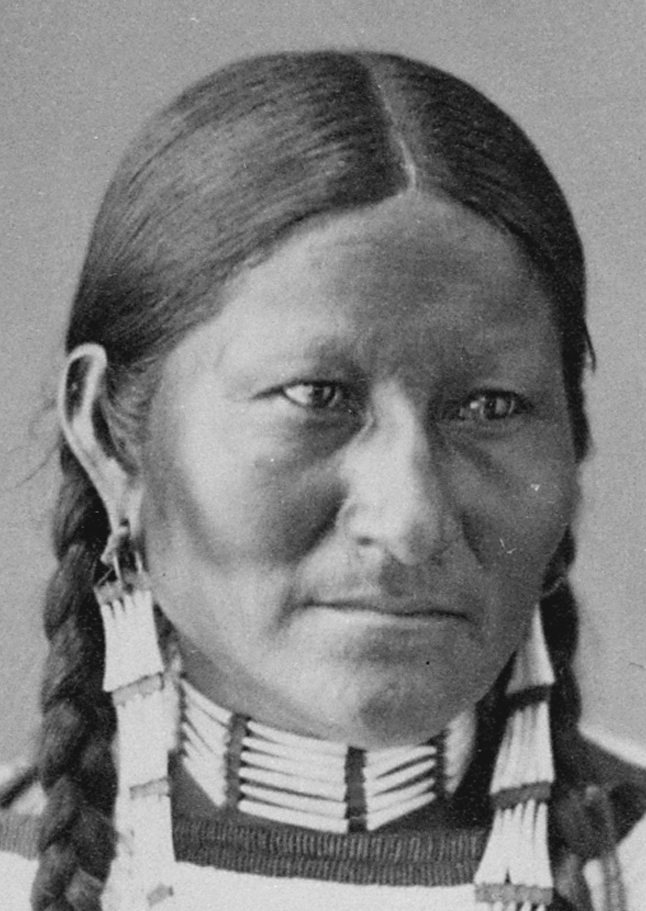
Wife of Spotted Tail, Brulé Sioux

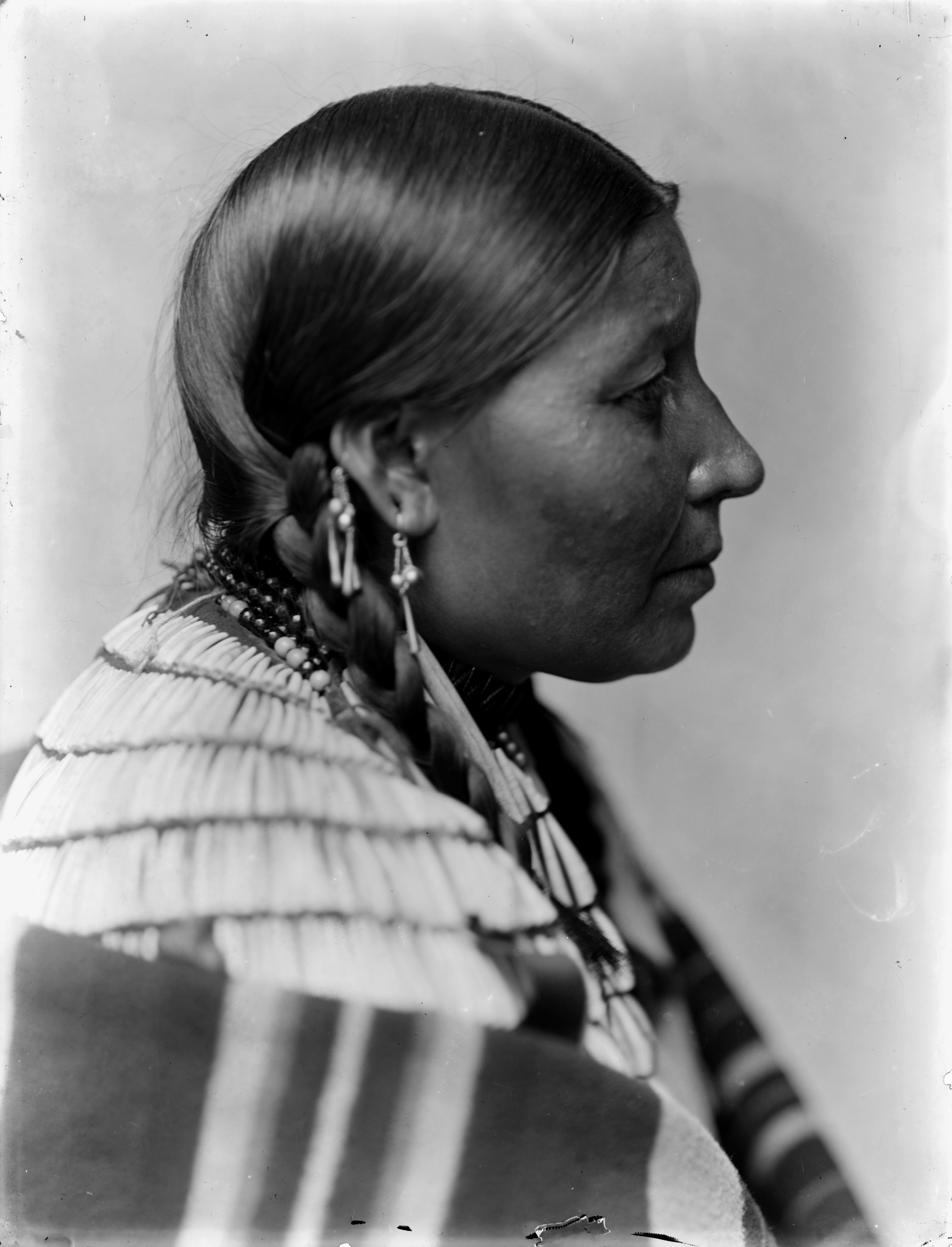
Wife of American Horse, Oglala Lakota

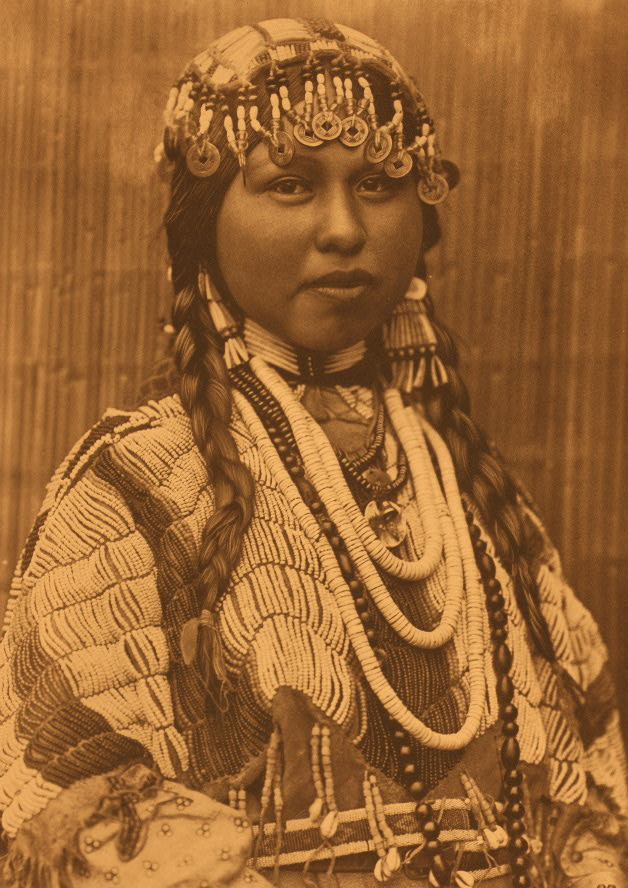
Woman in bridal garb, Wasco–Wishram

The shells of the wampum tuskshell have been in use for over 2500 years by the Indigenous peoples of North America. Three species of tusk shell are referred to with the historic and ethnographic term "dentalium", A. pretiosa, A. entalis, and D. neohexagonum. Only A. pretiosa was significantly used in trade prior to colonization. D. neohexagonum was found in several localities in San Miguel Island, California, while R.B. Clark noted A. entalis "was never collected by the Indians", only flooding the market due to demand for tusk shells in trade and introduction by European traders. Formerly in use as currency, they continue to be used in some communities for regalia.

Worn by both men and women, the shells were used as decorative material for beaded earrings, bracelets, dolls, hair adornments, hats, headdresses, necklaces, and nose pins. They served as an indicator of wealth for the wearer. Due to their natural perforations at both ends, the empty shells were ideal for use in beading.

The shells' scarcity, beauty, ease of transport, and difficulty to reproduce made it an excellent source of currency. Between the years of 1750 and 1850, the shells were sought out by both Indigenous peoples and European traders from the Hudson's Bay Company for use in trade. Value was determined by the length of a string of the shells. For traders, shells were strung and measured by the fathom (6 feet (1.8 m)), with approximately 40 shells making up a single fathom. It was traded across considerable distances north, south, and into the interior, and utilized as a currency far beyond the Pacific Northwest, being used across the Prairies and into the Great Lakes and as far south as Baja California. Ethnographic studies note the usage of dentalium shells by the Hupa, Tolowa, and Pomo in California, the Aleuts in Alaska, Western Dene groups, into the Arctic Coast with the Mackenzie Delta Inuit, the Plains Indigenous peoples including the Blackfoot and the Hidatsa, as well as into the Great Lakes Indigenous peoples with the Ojibwe and Saulteaux.

The shells were referred to as Hy'kwa (also haiqua) in the Chinook Jargon trade language. Interior tribes along the Missouri and Yellowstone Rivers referred to the shells as Iroquois shells, and had assumed an eastern origin. R.B. Clark notes that the name could have been a corruption of "haiqua". The Alutiiq referred to the shells as Aimhnaq.

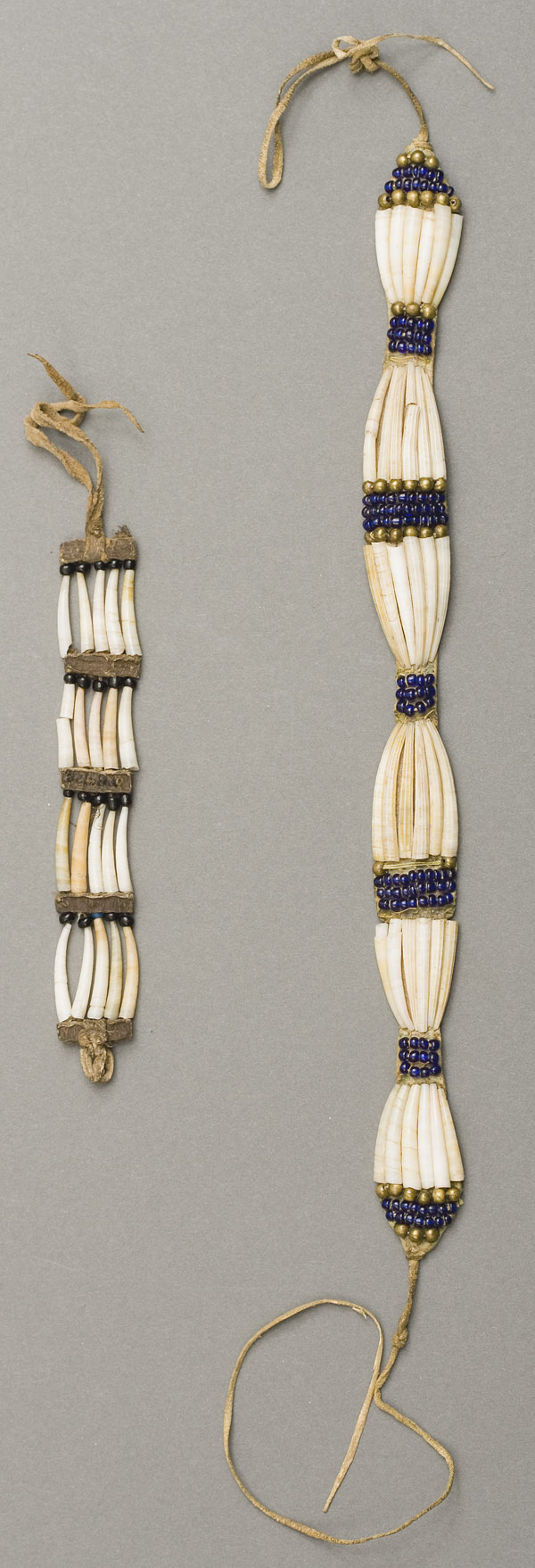
Nez Perce wawáq’aqt (choker) and necklace utilizing A. pretiosa shells with beads

=== Collection ===
Collection was done through three methods, collection through the use of an implement, collection by the use of bait, and collection off the beach. In British Columbia, the wampum tuskshell was collected by fishermen who worked from canoe using a device resembling a “great, stiff broom” which were extended by sticks to reach depths of up to 21 metres (69 ft). The head of the broom would close by means of a weighted board which was lowered, closing the head and grasping the shells. Phil Nuytten alongside Kwakwaka'wakw carver John Livingston reproduced the device in 1991 which successfully harvested the shells off Kyuquot Sound. In Alaska, G.I. Davydov, a Russian naval officer, reported that the shells were harvested by the Tlingit people off the Charlotte Islands by submerging a human corpse off the coast for several days. When the corpse was recovered, dentalium shells would be clinging to the body.

Ethnographic literature indicates that the source of the shells was limited to western Vancouver Island, between Quatsino Sound and Barkley Sound. The centres of collection occurred in the Nuu-chah-nulth communities of Checleseht, Kyuquot, and Ehattesaht, as well as the Kwakwakaʼwakw communities of Quatsino Sound and Cape Scott.

=== Archaeological history ===
Distribution of dentalium in the prehistoric period was somewhat similar to that of the ethnographic period, with prehistoric period dentalium shells having been recovered further south in California and having not been recovered in the far north. In coastal and Interior Plateau regions, the shell first occurs in sites between 5000 and 6000 years Before Present (BP). The plains have dentalium shells appear in sites at around 4000 BP. Intensive use of dentalium shell begins at 2500 BP and continued into the historic period.

The shells were recovered from primarily burial contexts, with the occasional find outside of the burial context. Shells with incised designs on the shell's surface have been recovered from British Columbia to California in addition to sites in the interior plateau.

=== Trade history ===
Dentalium trade between Europeans and Indigenous peoples began with James Cook's 1778 arrival at Yuquot, British Columbia. The site became a trading post between American, British, and Spanish traders and explorers. Trade between the Europeans and Indigenous peoples were conducted under the auspices of Maquinna, serving as a middleman who would purchase sea otter pelts in exchange for dentalium and who would then exchange those pelts for other goods. When Europeans discovered that the shells were used as money, trading was conducted directly with Nuu-chah-nulth and Kwakwakaʼwakw dentalium harvesters, and trading operations moved to the village of Nahwitti.

=== Conservation ===
The wampum tuskshell is currently listed as "Not evaluated" by the IUCN Red List, CITES, and Convention on the Conservation of Migratory Species of Wild Animals (CMS). In British Columbia it is unlisted on the British Columbia Red Blue List as well as on Committee on the Status of Endangered Wildlife in Canada (COSEWIC).

== Distribution ==
The wampum tuskshell is found on the Eastern Pacific. It is distributed from Alaska (Forrester Island), Canada, down to California and Mexico (Baja California peninsula). The maximum latitude for 55 degrees North, and the maximum longitude is -130.88 degrees. The minimum latitude is 32 degrees North, and the minimum longitude is -132.66 degrees.

=== Habitat ===
The wampum tuskshell inhabits areas of deep water in coarse, clean sand on the seabed's surface. It is found in association with sand dollars and the purple olive snail (Callianax biplicata). It is a benthic organism that occurs in depths of 2–152 metres (6.6–498.7 ft). It tolerates temperatures between 6.893–9.967 °C (44.407–49.941 °F). The concentration of dissolved oxygen in the water ranges from 4.37 to 6.534 ml/L. The concentration of dissolved nitrate in the water ranges from 7.622 to 20.476 μmol/L. The saturation of oxygen in the water ranges from 62.799 to 100.512 percent. Water phosphate concentration ranges from 0.963 to 2.1 μmol/L. The salinity that the wampum tuskshell is found in ranges from 31.942 to 32.853 psu. The water silicate concentration ranges from 14.539 to 51.234 μmol/L.

== Life history ==
As a Scaphopod, the wampum tuskshell is gonochoric, meaning each individual is either male or female. It reproduces sexually. Fertilization occurs within the mantle cavity of the organism.

The eggs hatch into free-swimming lecithotrophic trochophore larvae. This is then succeeded by shelled veligers, planktonic larvae.

Adults have a semi-infaunal lifestyle, living their lives partially buried in the sediment. They are slow-moving and feed on particulate organic matter, including algal cells, detritus, diatoms, and foraminifera, as a deposit feeder. Food is mucociliarily enmeshed using a structure known as the captacula, and then is processed using the radula.

The shells of the wampum tuskshell form the homes of the toothshell hermit crab (Orthopagurus minimus), whose straight body is unable to fit in curled marine snail shells. These crab-occupied shells were noted to often encrusted by Bryozoans or bear the drill markings as a result of moon snail predation.

== Taxonomy ==
The wampum tuskshell was first described by Thomas Nuttall in volume 3 of Thesaurus Conchyliorum by George Brettingham Sowerby II in the genus Dentalium as Dentalium pretiosum. It was moved to the genus Antalis in 2021 by Austin Hendy in A review of the Quaternary Mollusca of the Palos Verdes Peninsula. It is erroneously referred to by Antalis pretiosum in some sources.
