= Dentalium =

Dentalium may refer to:

- Dentalium (genus), a genus of tooth shells
- Dentalium shell, tusk shells used in indigenous jewelry and commerce in North America
