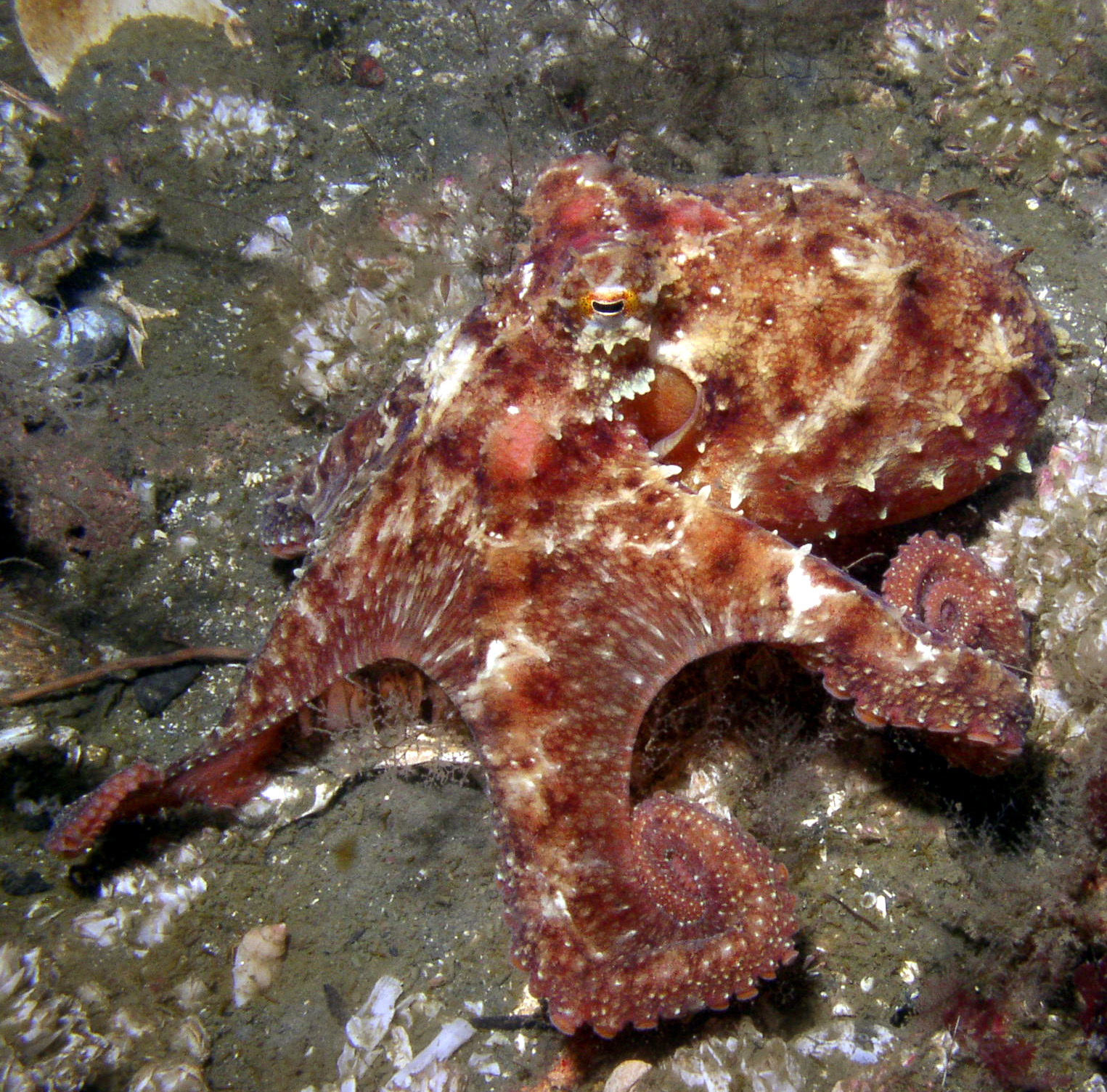

Conservation status
- Least Concern (IUCN 3.1)

Scientific classification
- Kingdom: Animalia
- Phylum: Mollusca
- Class: Cephalopoda
- Order: Octopoda
- Family: Octopodidae
- Genus: Octopus
- Species: O. rubescens

Binomial name
- Octopus rubescens Berry, 1953

Synonyms
- Octopus punctatus Gabb, 1862; Polypus hongkongensis Hoyle, 1885; Octopus dofleini Wülker, 1910; Polypus dofleini Wülker, 1910; Polypus apollyon Berry, 1912; Paroctopus apollyon Berry, 1912; Polypus gilbertianus Berry, 1912; Octopus gilbertianus Berry, 1912; Octopus pricei Berry, 1912; Octopus apollyon Berry, 1913

= East Pacific red octopus =

Species of cephalopod

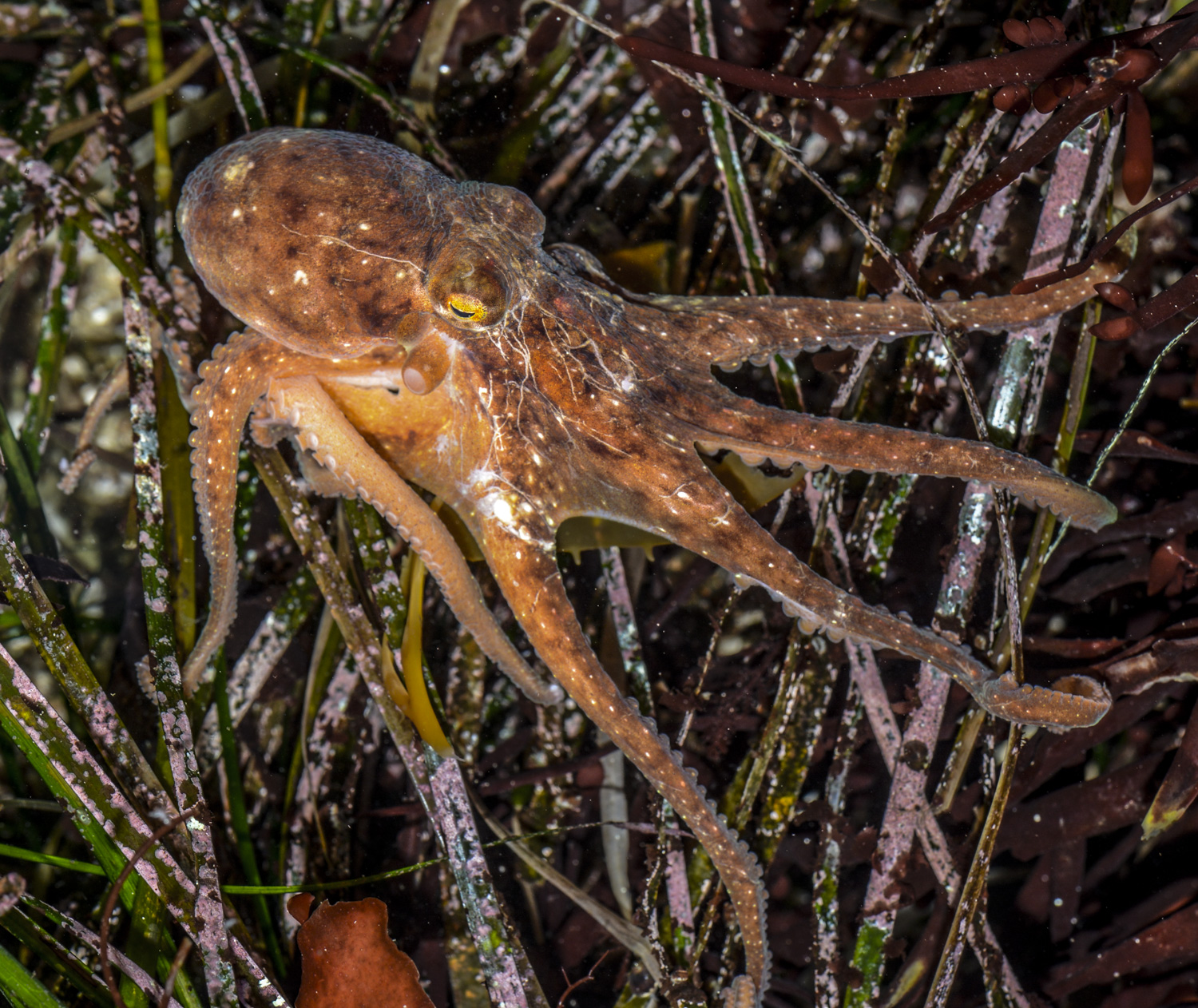
East Pacific red octopus, rescued from a gull near Los Osos, California

Octopus rubescens (commonly the East Pacific red octopus, also known as the ruby octopus, a preferred common due to the abundance of octopus species colloquially known as red octopus) is the most commonly occurring shallow-water octopus on much of the North American West Coast and a ubiquitous benthic predator in these habitats. Its range extends from the southern Gulf of California to at least the Gulf of Alaska, but may also occur in the western Pacific Ocean. O. rubescens occurs intertidally to a depth of 300 m (980 ft).

== Taxonomy ==
In the years prior to the description of this species in 1953, O. rubescens was widely considered to be a young Enteroctopus dofleini. Many early descriptions were based on a combination of O. rubescens and E. dofleini. To date, the taxonomy of this species remains somewhat unresolved. S.S. Berry's 1953 description is in truth a brief diagnosis, and considering the exceptionally wide range of the species, the animals currently covered under O. rubescens may prove to represent several subspecies or a species complex.

== Size and description ==
O. rubescens in captivity

O. rubescens generally grows to a mantle length of 8–10 cm (3.1–3.9 in), and arm length of 30–40 cm (12–16 in). Adult weight is generally 100–150 grams (3.5–5.3 oz), but animals up to 400 grams (14 oz) in weight have occasionally been observed.

Like all octopuses, O. rubescens can change its color and texture, making its appearance highly variable. Color can vary from a deep brick red, to brown, to white, or mottled mixtures of the three. It can be easily confused with small individuals of Enteroctopus dofleini in the northern end of this species' range. The two can be differentiated by the presence of three eyelash-like papillae below the eyes of O. rubescens that are absent in E. dofleini.

== Diet and foraging behavior ==
O. rubescens is a generalist predator and has been maintained on a wide variety of gastropods, bivalves, crabs, and barnacles in the lab. So far, very little quantification of its diet in the wild has been made, two studies on the subject have determined that diets within Puget Sound, Washington are dominated by gastropods, particularly Nucella lamellosa and Callianax alectona, but also composed of clams, scallops, and crabs. The planktonic larvae of O. rubescens have also been observed in the wild to consume krill. Although the captive behavior of O. rubescens led many to believe they are nocturnal foragers, a study within Puget Sound, Washington found that a localized population was likely diurnal. Recent camera trap observations within Puget Sound may also point towards a non-aggressive interspecific relationships between O. rubescens and the kelp greenling Hexagrammos decagrammus, potentially an analog to other cooperative hunting techniques observed between octopuses and fish.

As part of its feeding behavior, O. rubescens will pounce on prey and display a stereotypical sequence of color changes at the moment of capture. Following the capture of bivalve prey, it will often drill a hole through the shell to deliver venom and more easily open the shell. The octopuses will often concentrate their drill holes near the adductor muscles of the bivalve prey.

A 2011 study suggested O. rubescens may choose prey based on fat digestibility rather than on the amount of calories the octopuses are able to obtain from the food items. If this is true, the authors further argue, this would make O. rubescens a specialist predator by some measures rather than a generalist due to its specific nutrient requirements.

== Other behavior ==
O. rubescens was the first invertebrate in which individual personalities were demonstrated.

== In popular culture ==
Disney and Pixar's 2016 animated film, Finding Dory, a sequel to their 2003 film Finding Nemo, features an East Pacific red octopus named Hank, voiced by Ed O'Neill, as a prominent main character. In the film, Hank acts as a reluctant but persistent accomplice in assisting Dory in reuniting with her family, desiring her quarantine tag so he can go to an aquarium in Cleveland to live in solitude. He also suffers trauma from having lost an arm, to which Dory refers to him as a "septopus". The true reason why Hank only has seven arms is because the animators were unable to fit all eight on his model.
