= Callianax strigata =

Scientific classification
- Kingdom: Animalia
- Phylum: Mollusca
- Class: Gastropoda
- Subclass: Caenogastropoda
- Order: Neogastropoda
- Family: Olividae
- Genus: Callianax
- Species: C. strigata

Binomial name
- Callianax strigata Reeve, 1850

Synonyms
- Oliva strigata Reeve, 1850; Olivella pycna Berry, 1935; Olivella strigata (Reeve, 1850)

Species of gastropod

Callianax strigata is a species of small sea snail, marine gastropod mollusk in the family Olividae, the olives.

== Distribution ==
Lower West Coast of America - California.
