= Dentalium shell =

Material used in Native American jewelry

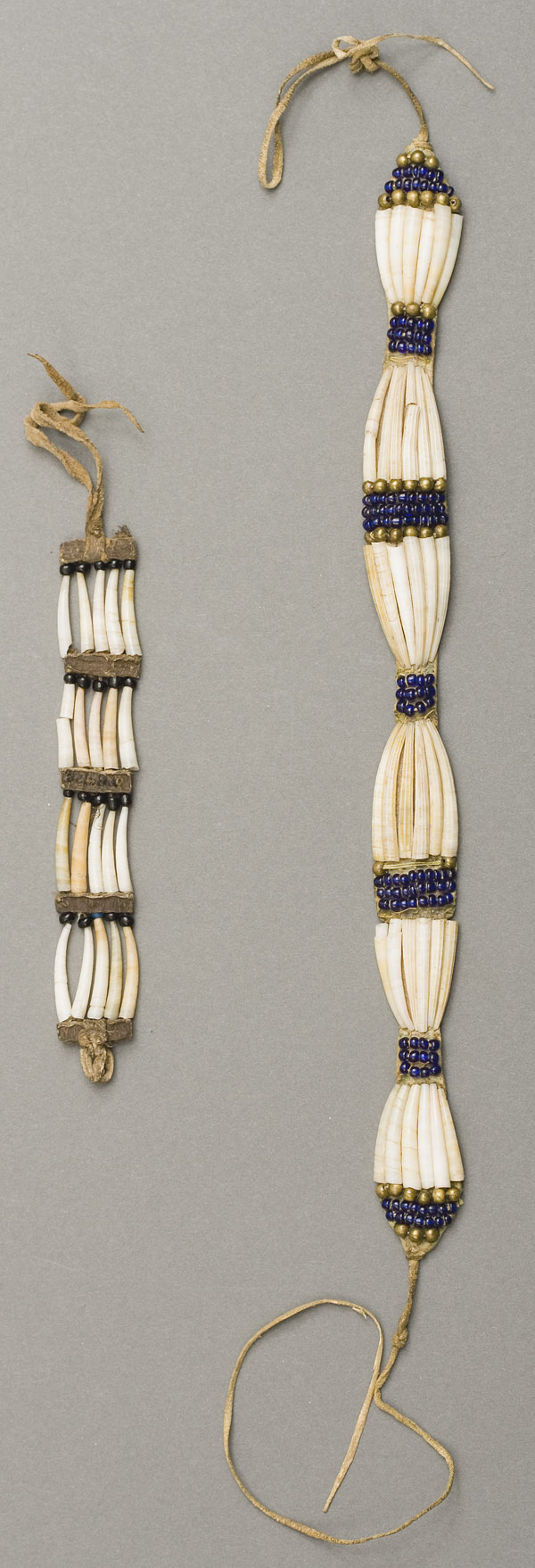
Plateau dentalium choker and bracelet, from Nez Perce National Historical Park, 19th century, made using Antalis pretiosa shells

The word dentalium, as commonly used by Native American artists and anthropologists, refers to tooth shells or tusk shells used in indigenous jewelry, adornment, and commerce in western Canada and the United States. These tusk shells are a kind of seashell, specifically the shells of scaphopod mollusks. The name "dentalium" is based on the scientific name for the genus Dentalium, but because the taxonomy has changed over time, not all of the species used are still placed in that genus; however, all of the species are certainly in the family Dentaliidae.

Dentalium shells were used by Inuit, First Nations, and Native Americans as an international trade item. This usage is found along the western coast of Canada and along the Pacific Ocean coast of the northwest United States extending southward to Southern California. Traditionally, the shells of Antalis pretiosa (previously known as Dentalium pretiosum, the precious dentalium (a species which occurs from Alaska to Baja California) were harvested from deep waters around the Pacific Northwest coast of North America, especially off the coast of Vancouver Island. Today most dentalium shells in the shell trade are smaller, more brittle, and are harvested from coasts off Asia—i.e. they are shells of Indo-Pacific species of scaphopods.

== Uses ==
=== Pacific Northwest ===
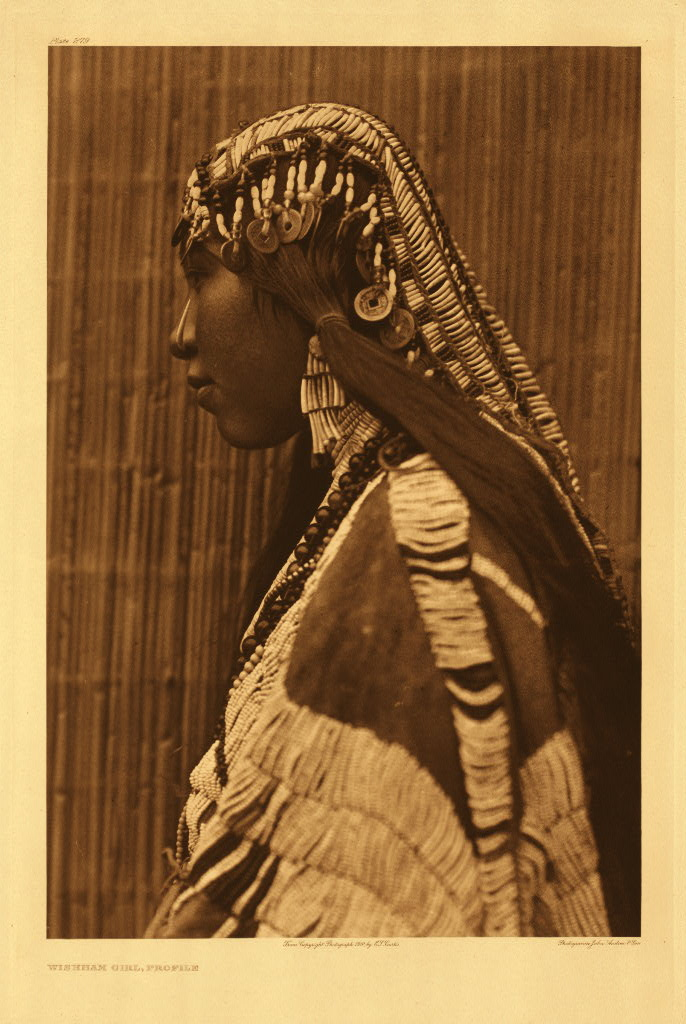
Wishram woman wearing a dentalium shell bridal headdress and earrings; photo by Edward Curtis

Peoples of the Northwest Pacific Coast would trade dentalium into the Great Plains, Great Basin, Central Canada, Northern Plateau and Alaska for other items including many foods, decorative materials, dyes, hides, macaw feathers which came from Central America, turquoise from the American Southwest, as well as many other items.

Nuu-chah-nulth people were the primary harvesters of dentalium shells. Among the Northwest Coastal tribes, the shells were valued for both trade and adornment. Young Nuu-chah-nulth girls of high status wore elaborate dentalium jewelry. When the jewelry was removed, a potlatch was held to celebrate, and the girl would be considered eligible for marriage.

Athabaskan peoples of Alaska and subarctic Canada incorporate dentalium into jewelry with glass beads. Along with iron, these items were regarded as prestigious trade goods in the 19th century.

Shells of the species Antalis pretiosa which had been gathered on the shores of Vancouver Island were first traded to the Canadian Plateau between 1000 and 1 BCE. During the 1st century CE, the shell was a common trade item in the Plateau. Some very elite women from Plateau tribes wore dentalium shells through pierced septa. Elaborate bridal headdresses from the 19th and early 20th centuries, features dentalium shells strung on hide with Chinese brass coins and glass beads. Nlaka'pamux people have included dentalium shells in their relatives' burials. The shells are sometimes given away at memorial services.

=== California ===
Dentalium shells are highly culturally significant to California tribes. Yurok oral history says that Pithváva, or "Big Dentalium," a deity, created that smaller dentalium and dictated their significance as sacred wealth. Among northern California tribes, dentalium was traditionally the most important unit of exchange – incorporated into regalia and used for gambling and commerce. The shell's length and quality determined value. Highest quality shells would be about 2.25" long, and a dozen would typically be strung together, and a 27.5" string of dentalium was the price of a redwood dugout canoe. Certain men, who became known as "Indian bankers," tattooed marks on their arms with which to measure the length of the shells. Among northern California tribes, such as the Yurok, Karuk, and Hupa, dentalium shells were stored in elk-antler purses or treasure baskets.

On the Central Coast of California, shells of Dentalium neohexagonum (a species that occurs from Monterey, California to Baja California) have been recovered from prehistoric habitation sites of the Chumash, who apparently used these shells as tubes, possibly in jewelry.

=== Great Plains ===
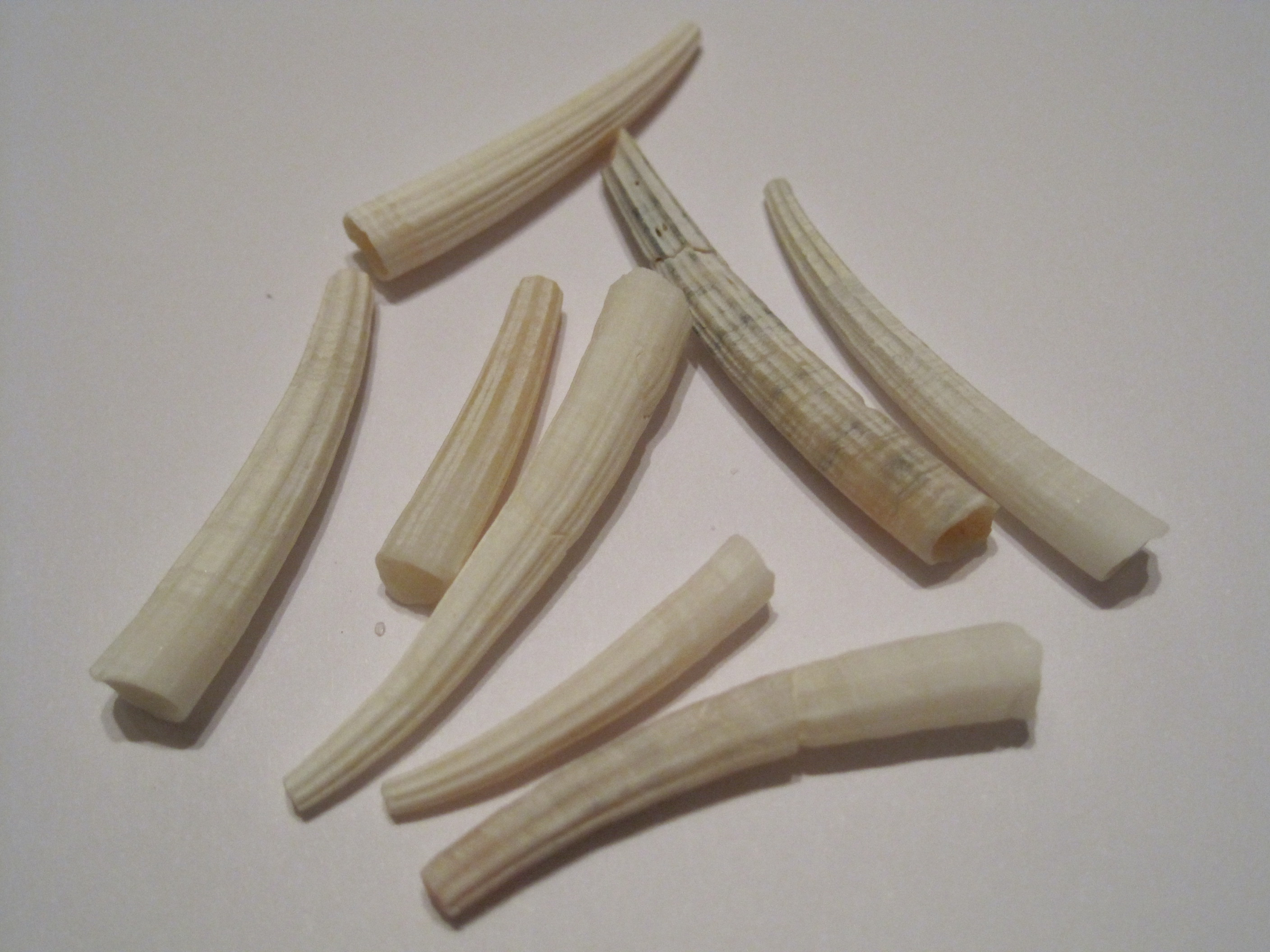
Loose dentalium shells

Among Plains Indians, dentalium shells have traditionally been associated with wealth and embellished women's capes, yokes of dresses, hair ornaments, necklaces, and long, dangling earrings.

=== Modern ===
Dentalium shells are still used today in Native American and Inuit regalia as decorations and jewelry.

=== Middle East ===
In the ancient Levant, dentalium shells were used in the ritual burials of the deceased, although uncertainty, of its significance to the dead, remains.

== See also ==
- Beadwork § Native American
- Shell money
