= Callianax =

Scientific classification
- Kingdom: Animalia
- Phylum: Mollusca
- Class: Gastropoda
- Subclass: Caenogastropoda
- Order: Neogastropoda
- Superfamily: Olivoidea
- Family: Olividae
- Subfamily: Olivellinae
- Genus: Callianax; H. Adams & A. Adams, 1853

Type species
- Oliva biplicata G. B. Sowerby I, 1825

Synonyms
- Olivella (Callianax) H. Adams & A. Adams, 1853 (original rank)

Genus of gastropods

Callianax is a genus of small predatory sea snails, marine gastropod molluscs in the subfamily Olivellinae of the family Olividae, the olives.

== Description ==
The shell is not polished. The acute spire is produced with the suture channelled. The aperture is wide and effuse in front. The callus of the inner lip is thick and defined. The columella is simple, or with a few plaits anteriorly.

== Species ==
- Callianax alectona (Duclos, 1835)
- Callianax biplicata (G. B. Sowerby I, 1825)
- Callianax diegensis (Oldroyd, 1921)
- Callianax strigata (Reeve, 1850)
