= Native American trade =

Trade among Indigenous people of North America

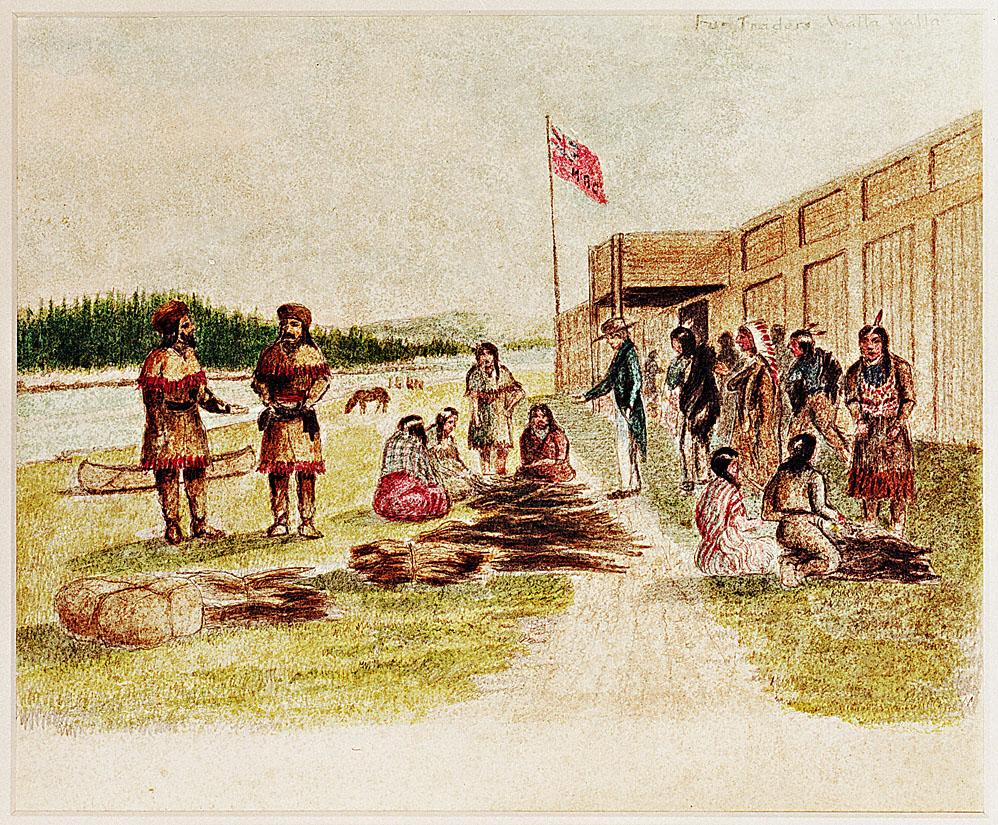
Fur trading at Fort Nez Percés in 1841.

Native American trade refers to trade among the Indigenous people of North America and with European settlers. Trade with Europeans began before the colonial period, continuing through the 19th century and declining around 1937.

The term Native American Trade in this context describes the people involved in the trade. The products involved varied by region and era. In most of Canada, the term is synonymous with the fur trade, since fur for making beaver hats was by far the most valuable product of the trade, from the European point of view. Demand for other products resulted in trade in those items: Europeans asked for deerskin on the southeast coast of the United States, buffalo skins and meat, and pemmican on the Great Plains. In turn, Native American demand influenced the trade of goods brought by Europeans.

Economic contact between Native Americans and European colonists began in the early stages of European settlement. From the 17th century to the 19th century, the English and French mainly traded for animal pelts and fur with Native Americans. In the late 1700s, Spanish explorers started settling in southern California and initiated the establishment of missions. These missions served as focal points for interactions between Native Americans and Spanish settlers, encompassing cultural exchanges, political negotiations, trade activities, and economic developments. Evidence of these exchanges and developments were kept by the Spanish who maintained detailed ledgers documenting items that were traded in Santa Barbara between them and the Chumash that lived in the missions. Eventually, wars, the dwindling of Native American populations, and the westward expansion of the United States led to the confinement of tribes to reservations and the end of this kind of economic relations between Indians and European Americans.

Other economic relations continued, especially in the alcohol trade around many reservations, and for Native American arts and crafts that are now shown for everyone to see. Today, many Native Americans satisfy a different kind of demand with the associated trades of their gaming casinos on reservations. These have been developed as entertainment and conference resorts, serving a wide market of customers, and generating very little revenues for tribes to use for economic development, as well as welfare and education of their people.

The first explorers to conduct trade with Native Americans were Giovanni da Verrazzano and Jacques Cartier in the 1520s–1540s. Verrazzano noted in his book, "If we wanted to trade with them for some of their things, they would come to the seashore on some rocks where the breakers were most violent while we remained on the little boat, and they sent us what they wanted to give on a rope, continually shouting to us not to approach the land." As visits from Europeans became more frequent and some Europeans began to settle in North America, Natives began to establish regular trade relations with these new colonists. The ideal locations for fur trading were near harbors where ships could come in.

== Trade between Native tribes ==
During the pre-Columbian era, Native American tribes often traded between themselves and outside bands. Throughout the Americas, Native American tribes had been trading for thousands of years using different material goods and/or currency.

=== Shell beads ===
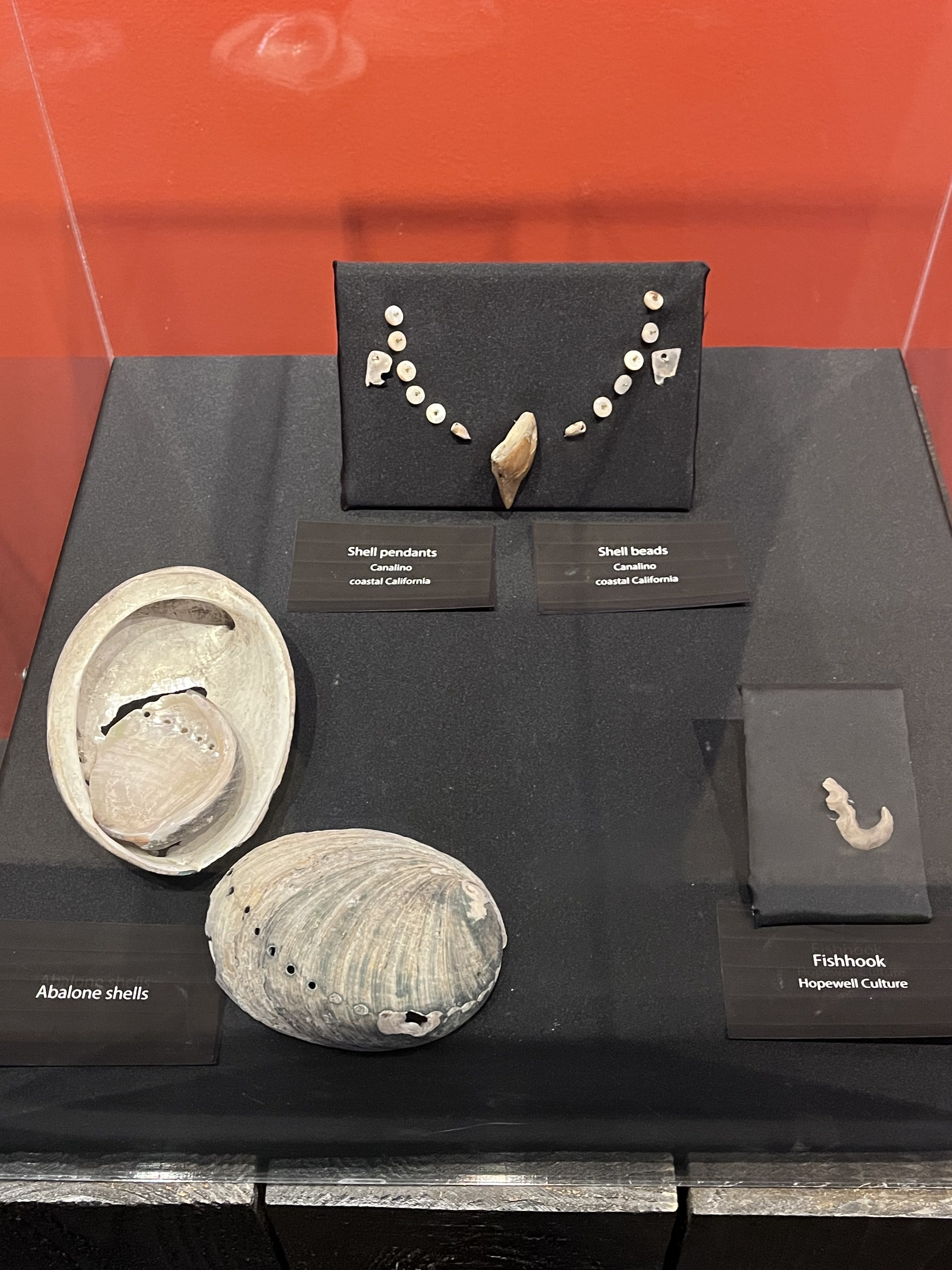
Shell beads and pendants from coastal California in the Sacred Earth Exhibit at the San Bernardino County Museum

Shell beads (also referred to as shell money) have been used for around 9,000–10,000 years in the Americas, both pre-contact and post-contact. It was most commonly used as a form of trade, either as a material to be exchanged, or as a form of currency.

The Olivella biplicata, or the purple olive shell was used during the early Holocene period, around 200–1835 CE, spanning around 1,500 years. Typically used by the Chumash (located in the central and southern coastal regions of California), it was crafted and shaped into 160 different variations of shell beads, which were used as a form of currency and status. Some examples of these variant styles include; needle-drilled disks, lipped beads, cupped beads, thin rectangles (pendant), thin rectangles (sequin). Made in the Santa Barbara Channel, they were distributed throughout Chumash territory and was used throughout different areas as currency, allowing for trade between different bands, making its way up California, the Great Basin, and in Western North America.

The Cahuilla (located in Palm springs) used beads traded from the Serrano (who had received them from the Gabrieleno/Tongva) to create their own form of shell bead currency. Specific lengths were assigned for different amounts of money. An example of this is a "witchu", a string of shell beads from the forehead to the ground, then multiplied by 4 equal to 50 United States cents. Another example is the "napanaa", measured by wrapping around the wrists and fingers, equal to 20 cents.

=== Basketry ===
Trade played a central role in spreading basket designs among California tribes through active exchange networks involving ceremonial events, visits, and intermarriages. This facilitated the advertising of design styles across neighboring communities, resulting in highly similar systems among tribes in close proximity. This uniformity in basket weaving shows a strong trade network, contrasting with the variability observed in tribes like the Pomo, who lived in more isolated communities in northern California. However, tribes such as the Yurok, Karuk, and Hupa, located along the northwestern California coast and in the Klamath Mountains, exhibited nearly identical basketry.

The intertribal commerce of Native American tribes across California and adjacent regions was characterized by the exchange of baskets as valuable commodities. Tribes engaged in the exchange of baskets to obtain goods, forge alliances, and foster social connections. For instance, the Yokuts tribes, located in the Central Valley and Sierra Nevada foothills, engaged in extensive trade networks with neighboring tribes such as Miwok, Coast Miwok, and Tubatulabal. Similarly, the Salinan people, residing along the Central Coast of California, participated in basket trade with the Yokuts and Chumash tribes from the coastal regions. Tribes engaged in trade also obtained a variety of goods in return. These included natural resources such as obsidian, fish, salt, acorns, pine nuts, and manzanita berries.

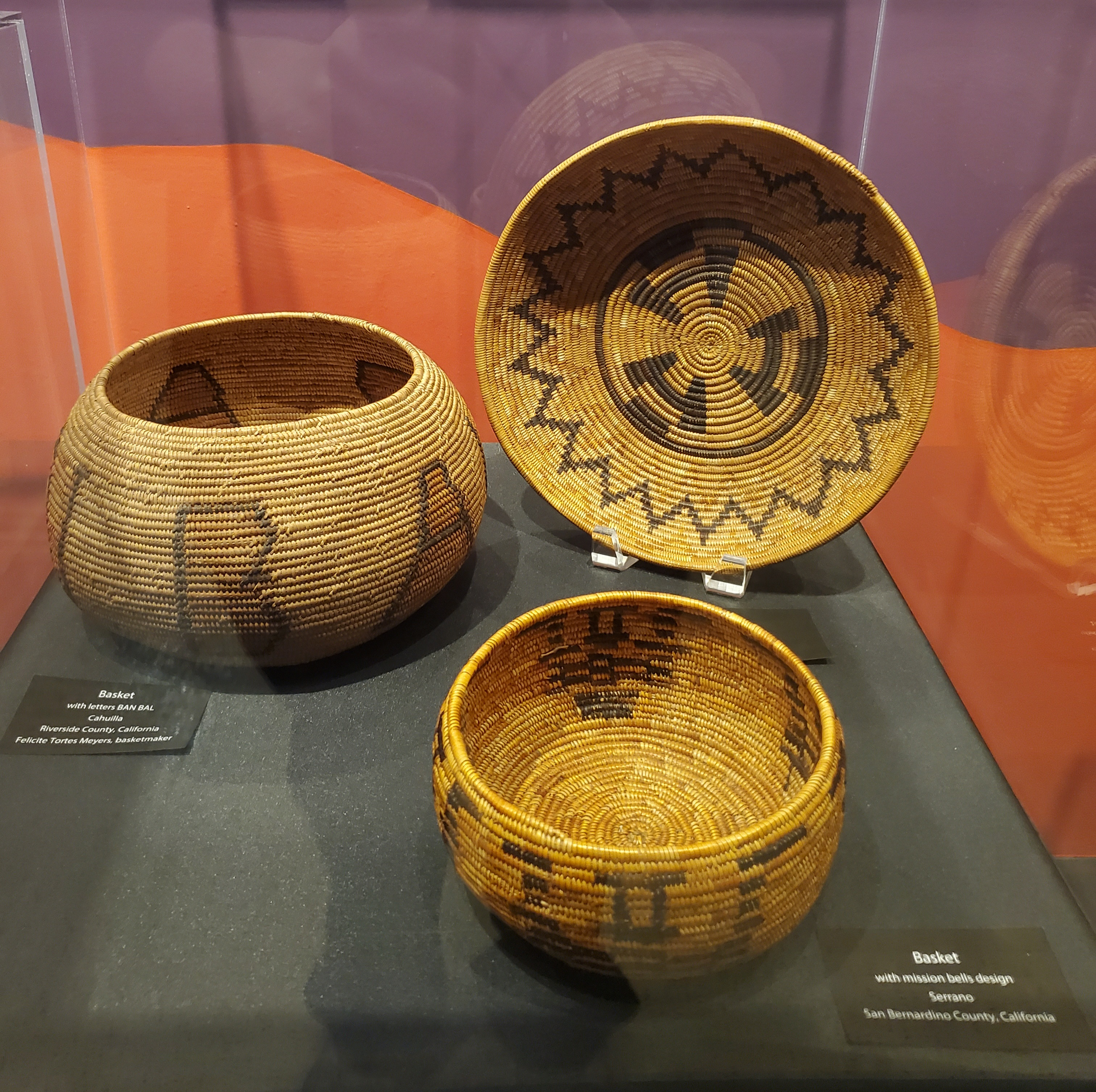
Maidu coiled baskets were discovered from the North Fork of the Willamette River in Oregon. This particular basket, from the San Bernardino County Museum, exhibits similar coiling techniques and craftsmanship of Maidu artisans.

Maidu baskets originate primarily from northeastern California, the native territory of the Maidu people. The Maidu are indigenous to the Sierra Nevada foothills and adjacent valleys, including areas such as the Sacramento Valley, the northern Sierra Nevada, and the Cascade Range. The Maidu had access to a variety of natural resources, influencing the materials used in their basketry. These baskets are crafted using traditional techniques passed down through generations and are made from locally sourced materials such as willow, maple, redbud, and ferns, abundant in the surrounding forests and valleys. Maidu's skill in crafting high-quality baskets made them desirable trade partners, attracting interest from other tribes seeking their goods. Additionally, engaging in trade allowed the Maidu to acquire resources not readily available in their own territory. Trade served as a means of fostering alliances and maintaining social connections with neighboring groups, contributing to the cohesion and stability of the region. Through trade, the Maidu could also access items of ceremonial significance or prestige, enhancing their cultural practices and status within the broader network of Native American tribes in the region.

=== Fur trade in California ===
Rabbit skin blankets were a textile category that was often traded among California groups. Great Basin and other desert groups fringing California, with a good supply of hares and cottontails, were important sources for trade. The Surprise Valley Northern Paiute traded them to the Central and Southern Miwok but also received them, especially from the Tübatulabal.

== Great Plains trading networks ==
The trading networks encountered by the first Europeans on the Great Plains were built on a number of trading centers acting as hubs in an advanced system of exchange over great distances. The primary centers were found at the villages of the Mandan, Hidatsa, and Arikara, with a surplus of agricultural produce that could be exchanged. Secondary centers were found at the villages of the Pawnee, Kansa, and Osage on the central great plains, and at the Caddo villages on the southern plains. The "Dakota rendezvous" was an important annual trading fair among the Sioux. European demand for fur changed the relations of the plains, increased the occurrence of war, and displaced several Indian nations that were forced away by the Sioux coming from the east. On the northern plains, European trade lay in the hands of the Hudson's Bay Company, although most of the territory belonged to France, and later Spain. European trade on the central plains was controlled by French merchants, first from New Orleans, later from St. Louis. From the mid-1700s, the Comanche became an increasingly important military and commercial factor on the southern plains, forcing the Apaches into the mountains, and exchanging goods and spoils with the Southwestern trading networks hubs in New Mexico.

== Trade with early European settlers ==
=== Plymouth and Jamestown ===
To set up a thriving colony, settlers in the New World needed the five factors of production that contribute to the creation of wealth: land (natural resources), labor, capital, entrepreneurship, and knowledge. Often, trading with Native Americans resulted in colonists gaining needed knowledge and natural resources. Examples of this can be seen in the English settlements of Plymouth Bay and Jamestown. Massasoit, a sachem of the Wampanoag people, and Squanto, a Patuxet who acted as a diplomat, helped the Pilgrims of Plymouth Bay establish their colony by teaching them skills in cultivating this land and hunting. In return for weapons and tools, these Native Americans provided the colonists with important natural resources, including food. In 1621, Massasoit established one of the earliest trading pacts between Europeans and Natives by signing a treaty with the Plymouth Colony to engage in peaceful trade. However, as the colonial population in New England began to increase, the Wampanoag became uneasy about being displaced by the colonists. Gradually, tensions escalated, leading to King Philip's War, an armed conflict between the Pilgrims and the Native Americans in the area. The war ended with the defeat of the Native tribe, causing a serious fracture amongst relations between the Pilgrims and Native Americans.

Relations between settlers in the Jamestown area and Native Americans ended similarly. Initially, the Powhatan aided the English settlers with food and clothing, helping them survive the early difficult years. However, relations between the two groups deteriorated after three years, resulting in a war.

=== Fur trading posts ===
Fur trading was one of the main economic activities in Northern America from the late 16th century to the mid-19th century. At the time, the demand for fur was surging in Europe as it was used to make cloth and fancy hats. Data collected from England in the 18th century highlights that the years from 1746 to 1763 saw an increase of 12 shillings per pelt. It has been calculated that over 20 million beaver hats were exported from England alone from 1700 to 1770. Both trading partners, Native Americans, and Europeans, provided the other a comparative advantage in the fur trade industry. The opportunity cost of hunting beavers in Europe was extremely high: by the seventeenth and eighteenth centuries, the Eurasian beaver was near extinction in England and France. On the other hand, traders and trappers thought the wildlife in the New World was essentially limitless. Native Americans made use of the trade goods received, particularly knives, axes, and guns. The fur trade provided a stable source of income for many Native Americans until the mid-19th century when changing fashion trends in Europe and a decline in the beaver population in North America brought about a collapse in demand for fur.

=== Obsidian ===
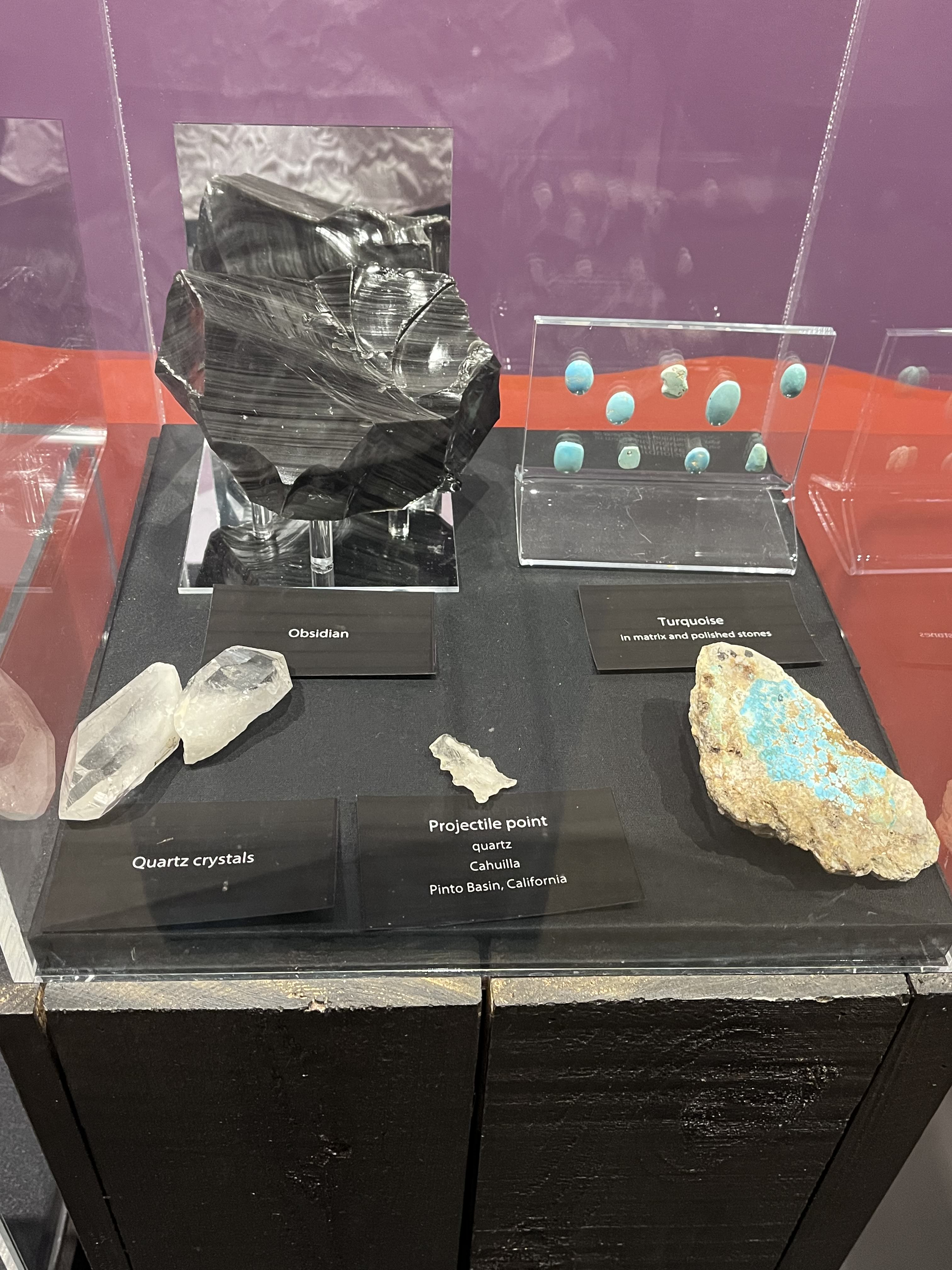
An example of obsidian in the Sacred Earth Exhibit at the San Bernardino County Museum

Archeological evidence from missions in northern California conclude that Native Americans rerouted obsidian exchange networks through Spanish missions such as Mission San José which existed from 1797 into the 1840s. Mission San José was located in Ohlone territory, where stone tool technologies were prevalent. Despite the constraints of colonialism, Native Americans who lived at the mission were able to trade obsidian through direct geological sources such as the Cascade Range in modern-day northern California and Oregon or through evolving trade networks, which involved interactions with other tribes, as well as the Spaniards.

=== Trade with the Spaniards ===
Trading between Spanish settlers and Native Americans was rare and occurred in parts of New Mexico and California. The Spaniards mainly intended to spread the Christian faith to Natives and to establish the encomienda system. The most significant effect of trading with the Spanish was the introduction of the horse to the Ute in New Mexico. Gradually, horses bred and their use was adopted across the Great Plains, dramatically altering the lifestyles and customs of many Native American tribes. Many Natives switched from a hunter-gatherer economy to a nomadic lifestyle after they began using horses for transportation. They had a greater range for hunting bison and trading with other tribes. Native Americans used obsidian for thousands of years pre-contact with Europeans. As Native Americans began to settle at centralized mission establishments, they brought in obsidian items such as projectile points. The maintenance of resources such as obsidian originated from far distances such as Napa Valley, CA indicates that indigenous stone tools were traded with people at Spanish missions.

=== Ceramic trade within Spanish missions ===
The majority of imported ceramics arrived in Alta California, via annual supply ships from the Naval Department of San Blas. San Blas was established in 1768 for the express purpose of facilitating the Manila galleon trade and serving as a supply depot for colonial settlements in Alta California. Local ceramics were produced within each mission community rather than vessels obtained in trade from autonomous Indigenous potters. The San Diego presidio, table service at the four missions San Carlos, San Antonio, San Juan Bautista, and Santa Clara likely included both locally produced wares and imported wares because several typical tableware forms such as cups and plates are not present in ware assemblages.

=== Relationship between Europeans and Natives ===
It took time for Europeans and Native Americans to learn the customs of the other side. When Europeans first encountered a tribe, they would often be offered fur, food, or other items as gifts. The Europeans did not understand they were supposed to take on an alliance with the natives, including helping them against their enemies. Native American tribes regularly practice gift-giving as part of their social relations. Because the Europeans did not (or most of them), they were considered to be rude, and savage.

After observing that Europeans wanted to trade goods for the skins and other items, Native Americans entered into that. Both sides became involved in the conflicts of the other. In New France, Carolina, Virginia, New England, and New Netherland, the Europeans became drawn into the endemic warfare of their trading partners. As Native Americans were pressed into alliances by the Europeans for Queen Anne's War, the Seven Years' War, the Nine Years' War, and other standing competitions among the European powers of France, Great Britain, and Spain, with whom they were dealing in North America, they felt drawn into the Europeans' endemic warfare.

== Late 18th century to present ==
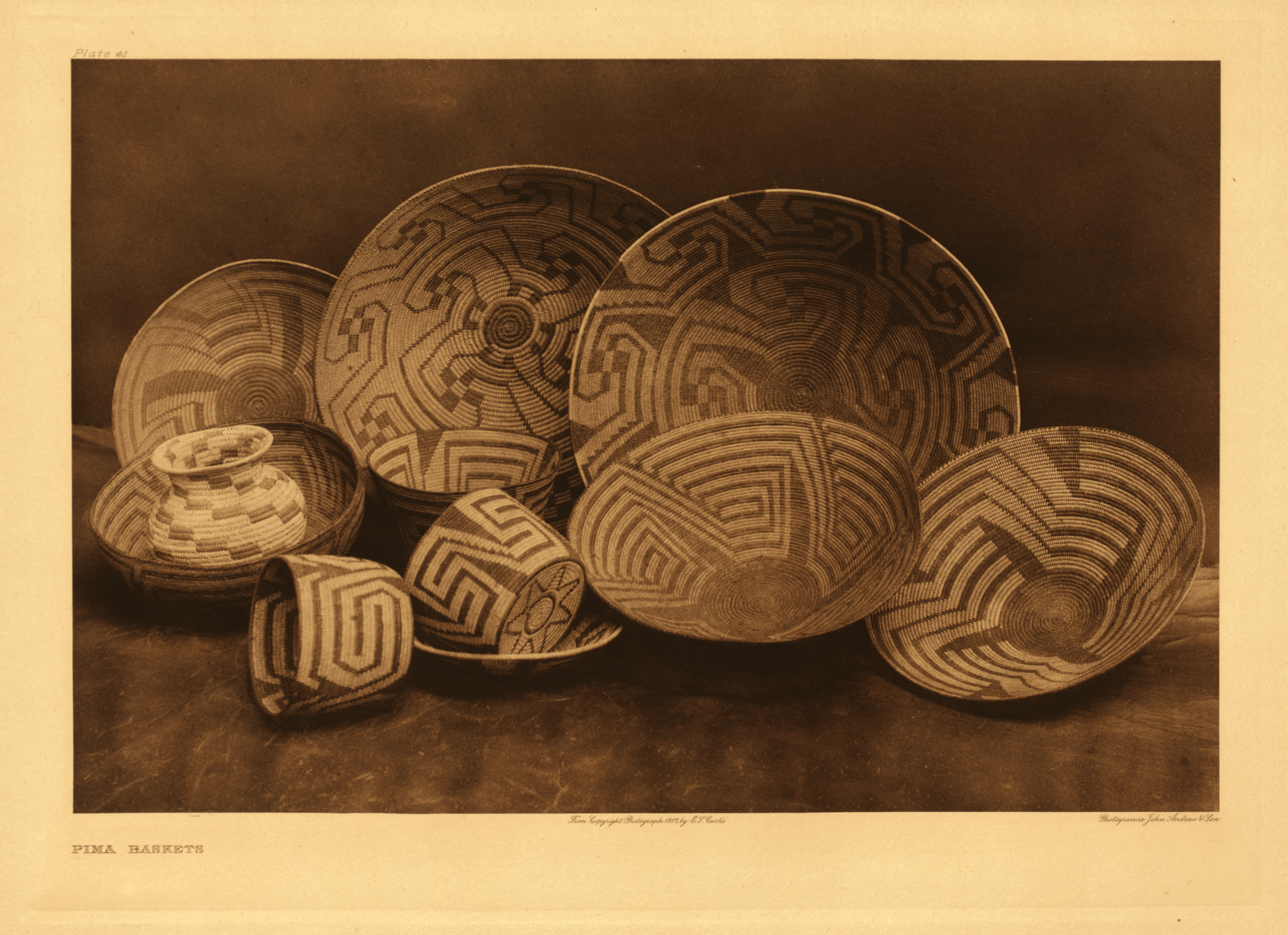
Practical within their own cultures, decorative baskets were also important trade items for many tribes. Photo: Edward Curtis.

After the United States became independent, it enacted legislation to regulate trading with the Indians/Native Americans, under the Indian Intercourse Act, first passed on July 22, 1790. Later the Bureau of Indian Affairs, which was then part of the War Department, issued licenses to traders in the Native Territory. Under removal, the largest tribes from the Southeast and north of Ohio were moved west of the Mississippi River. By 1834, Native territory had been designated as what was then most of the United States west of the Mississippi, primarily what became Arkansas, Kansas, and Oklahoma. Territories of the upper West were still occupied by native tribes as well. Mountain men and traders from Mexico freely operated there independently of the US.

After the formation of the United States, the commerce clause of the Constitution gave Congress the power to "regulate Commerce with foreign Nations, and among the several States, and with the Native tribes." In the 19th century, the American government passed legislation to support the relocation of tribes to reservations to extinguish their title to lands that could be sold to European Americans. The Indian Removal Act of 1830 forced tribes such as the Cherokee and the Choctaw to move out of their homelands. Resistance by Native Americans to relocate resulted in conflicts such as the Second Seminole War, that caused the deaths of 3,000 Native Americans. Forcing tribes to relocate and to adjust to isolated reservations often unsuitable for the subsistence farming they were encouraged to undertake, made many of them dependent on the U.S. government for annuities and supplies. They had difficulty trying to develop economic systems of their own.

As outlined by Kalt and Cornell in their book, What Can Tribes Do? Strategies and Institutions in American Native Economic Development, on reservations, tribes lacked access to capital, were assigned to areas with poor natural resources (or had their resources stolen or kept from their control), and did not possess skilled labor.

Today, many programs, such as the Harvard Project on American Indian Economic Development, exist to foster conditions that will help reservations become independent and financially stable communities. Since the late 20th century, many tribes have established gaming casinos. The most successful ones use part of the revenues for the economic development of their nations, as well as for welfare and education for all their tribal members.
