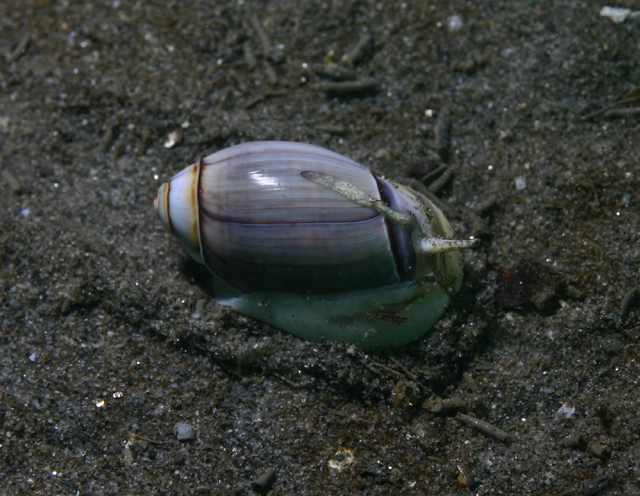

Scientific classification
- Kingdom: Animalia
- Phylum: Mollusca
- Class: Gastropoda
- Subclass: Caenogastropoda
- Order: Neogastropoda
- Family: Olividae
- Genus: Callianax
- Species: C. biplicata

Binomial name
- Callianax biplicata Sowerby I, 1825

Synonyms
- Oliva biplicata G. B. Sowerby I, 1825; Olivella biplicata (G. B. Sowerby I, 1825); † Olivella biplicata angelena T. Oldroyd, 1918; Olivella biplicata fucana Oldroyd, 1921; Olivella biplicata lapillus Vanatta, 1915; Olivella biplicata parva Oldroyd, 1921

= Callianax biplicata =

Species of gastropod

Callianax biplicata, common names the purple dwarf olive, purple olive shell, or purple olivella is a species of small predatory sea snail, a marine gastropod mollusc in the family Olividae, the olives.

== Distribution ==
Callianax biplicata snails are found in the Eastern Pacific Ocean coasts from British Columbia, Canada to Baja California, Mexico.

== Habitat ==
This species is common on sandy substrates intertidally and subtidally, in bays and the outer coast.

== Life habits ==
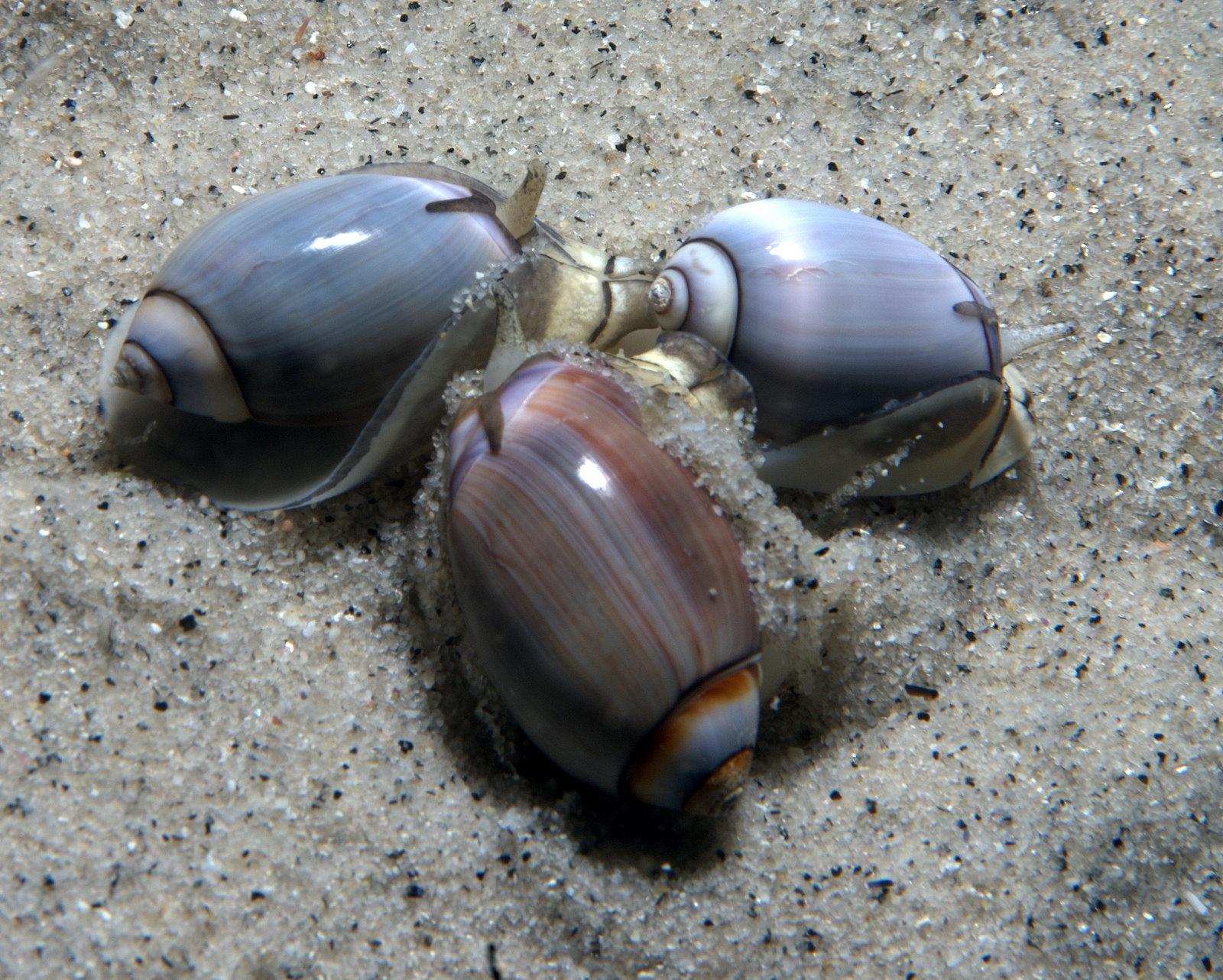
Three specimen of Callianax biplicata.

These snails are carnivorous or omnivorous sand-burrowers.

== Shell description ==
This shell of this species is quite solid, and large for an Olivella, with adult shells ranging from 20 mm to 27 mm in length, about one inch. The shell is smooth, shiny, and is an elongated oval in shape. The shell is often some shade of greyish purple, but it can also be whitish, tan, or dark brown. On the darker color forms there is often some rich yellow above the suture on the spire.

At the anterior end of the long narrow aperture there is a siphonal notch, from which the siphon of the living animal protrudes.

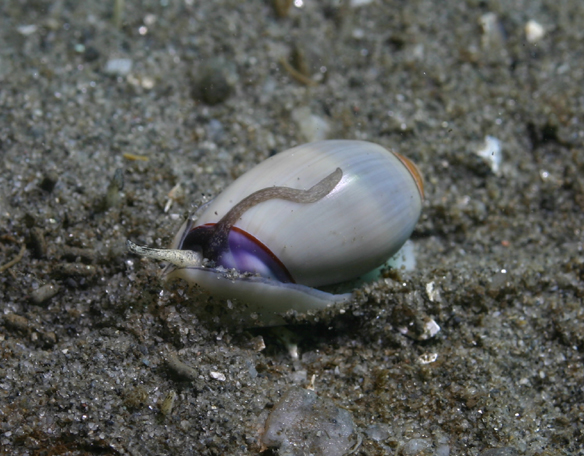
Callianax biplicata, a pale individual

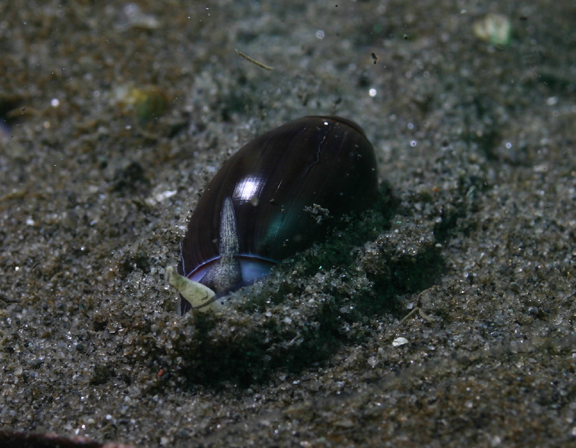
Callianax biplicata, the dark morph

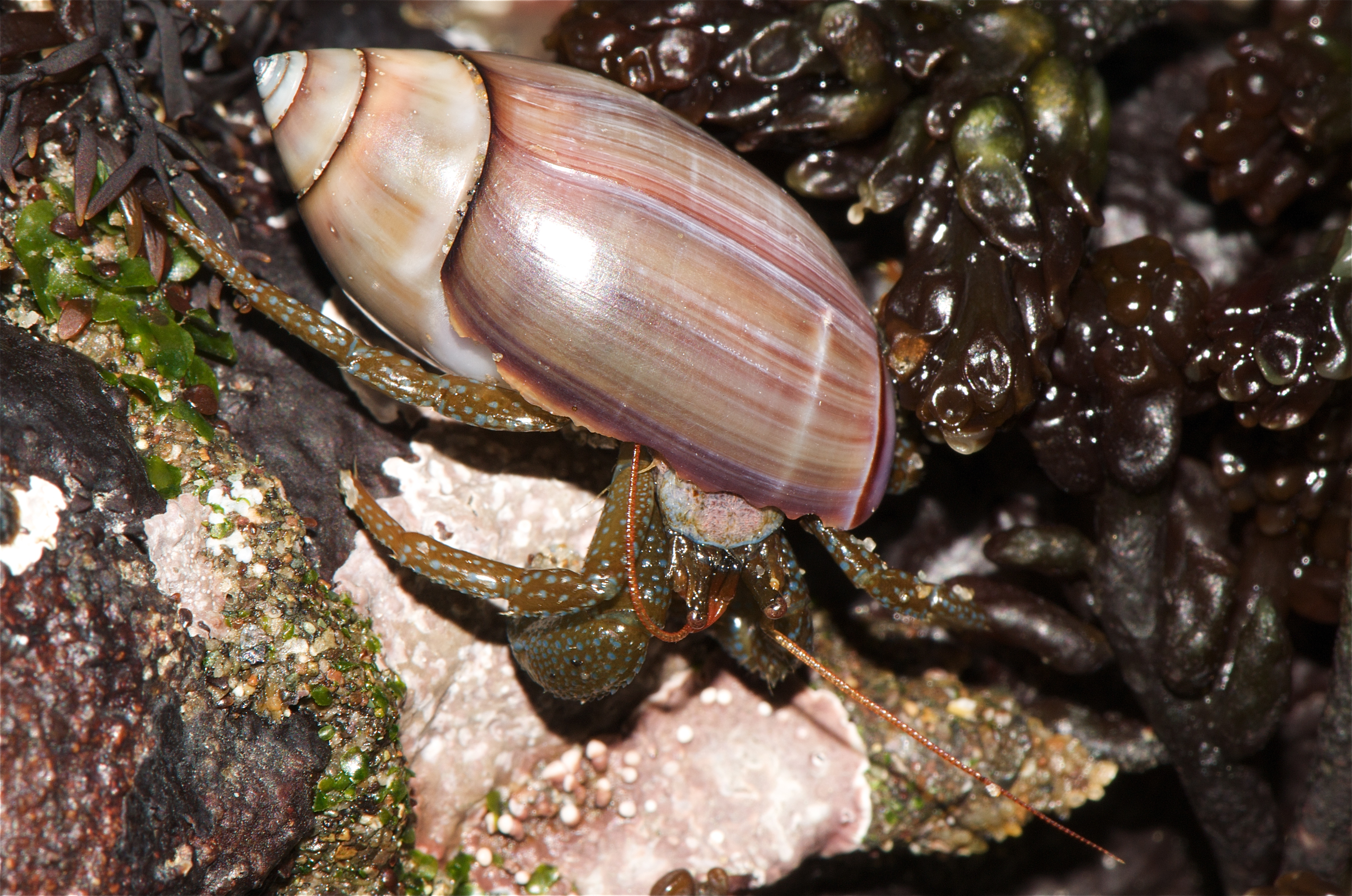
'Hermit crab using the shell of Callianax biplicata

== Human use ==
Native people of central and southern California used the shell of this species to make decorative beads for at least the last 9,000 years. Such beads have been discovered in archaeological contexts as far inland as Idaho and Arizona. Within the past 1,000 years these beads began to be manufactured in large quantities on southern California's Santa Barbara Channel Islands, indicating that they were used for shell money in Native American trade. The historic Chumash people called them anchum.
