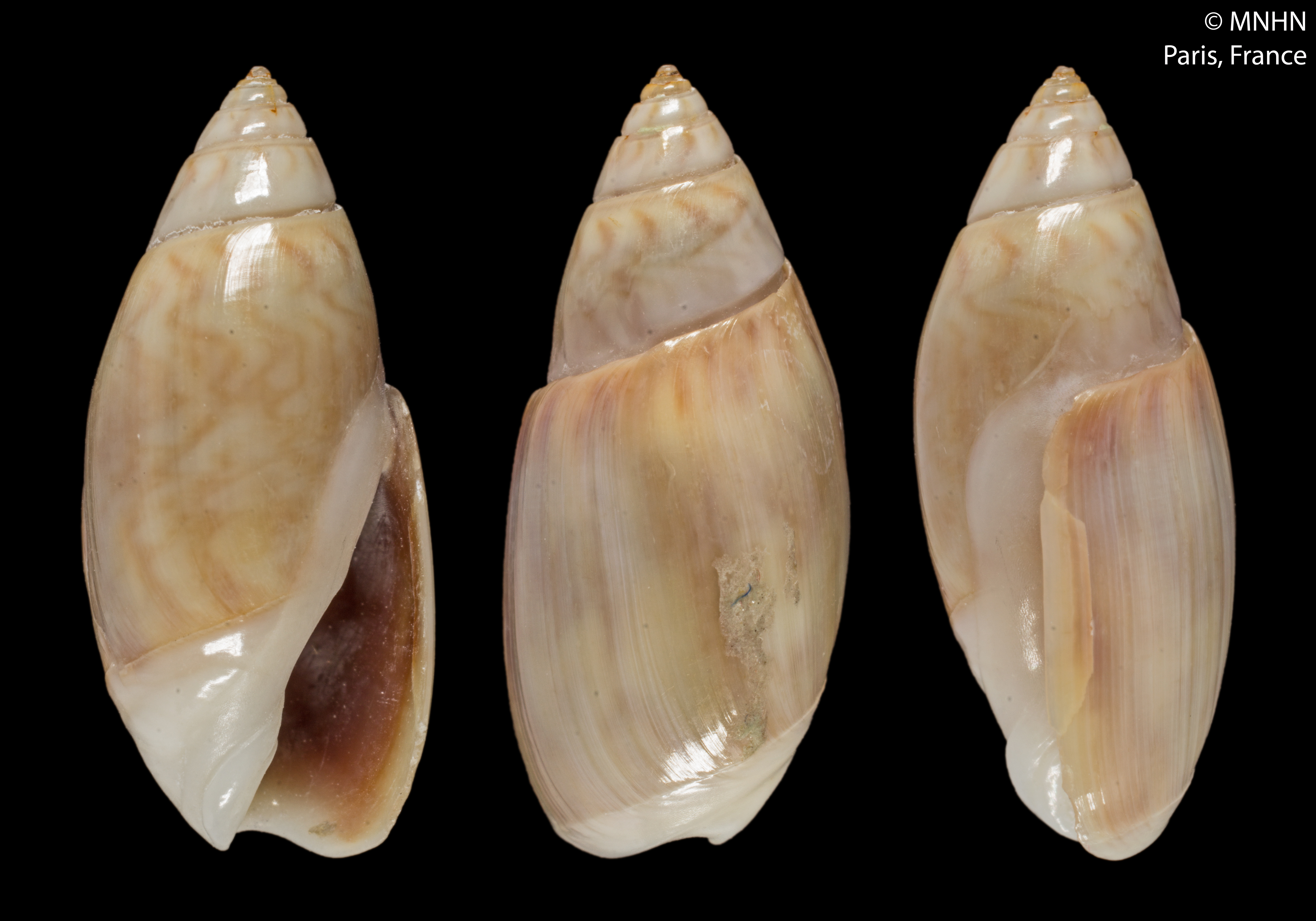
- Shell of Callianax alectona (syntype at MNHN, Paris)

Scientific classification
- Kingdom: Animalia
- Phylum: Mollusca
- Class: Gastropoda
- Subclass: Caenogastropoda
- Order: Neogastropoda
- Family: Olividae
- Genus: Callianax
- Species: C. alectona

Binomial name
- Callianax alectona (Duclos, 1835)

Synonyms
- Oliva alectona Duclos, 1835 (original combination); Oliva anazora var. porteri Dall, 1910; Olivella alectona (Duclos, 1835); Olivella baetica Carpenter, 1864; Olivella boetica [sic] (misspelling due to incorrect reading of "æ" in italic font, resembling "œ" in Carpenter's paper. ); Olivella boetica mexicana Oldroyd, 1921

= Callianax alectona =

Species of gastropod

Callianax alectona is a species of small sea snail, marine gastropod mollusk in the family Olividae, the olives.

== Distribution ==
This species occurs in the Pacific Ocean off California.
