= Dentalium neohexagonum =

Scientific classification
- Kingdom: Animalia
- Phylum: Mollusca
- Class: Scaphopoda
- Order: Dentaliida
- Family: Dentaliidae
- Genus: Dentalium
- Species: D. neohexagonum

Binomial name
- Dentalium neohexagonum Sharp and Pilsbry, 1897

Species of mollusc

Dentalium neohexagonum is a species of tusk shell, a marine scaphopod mollusk in the family Dentaliidae. As the Latin name implies, the cross section of this shell is hexagonal; hence its common name is six-sided tusk shell.

This species occurs along the central and southern California coast of the Pacific Ocean. The shells of this species are known to have been used by the Chumash people at least as early as circa 1000 AD, in the Morro Bay area. They were used as shell money rather than food.

== See also ==
- Chumash people
