= Gadila =

Gadila may refer to:

- MV Gadila, an Anglo Saxon Royal Dutch/Shell oil tankers converted to become a Merchant Aircraft Carrier
- Gadila (mollusc), a tusk shell genus in the family Gadilidae
