= Cadulus teliger =

Scientific classification
- Kingdom: Animalia
- Phylum: Mollusca
- Class: Scaphopoda
- Order: Gadilida
- Family: Gadilidae
- Genus: Cadulus
- Species: C. teliger

Binomial name
- Cadulus teliger Finlay, 1927

Species of mollusc

Cadulus teliger is a species of small tusk shell, a marine scaphopod mollusk in the family Gadilidae. This species is endemic to New Zealand waters. It can be found from the Three Kings Islands to the Chatham Islands, at depths of between 15 and 360 m, and lives off the Auckland Islands at depths of approximately 170 m.
