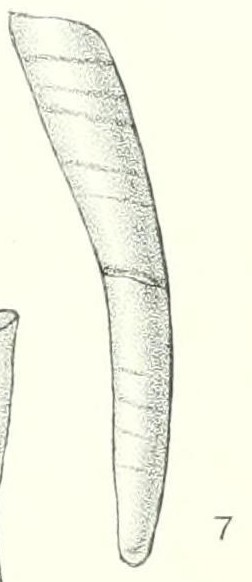
- illustration of Cadulus delicatulus, 12 × 1.7 mm

Scientific classification
- Kingdom: Animalia
- Phylum: Mollusca
- Class: Scaphopoda
- Order: Gadilida
- Family: Gadilidae
- Genus: Cadulus
- Species: C. delicatulus

Binomial name
- Cadulus delicatulus Suter, 1913

= Cadulus delicatulus =

Species of mollusc

Cadulus delicatulus is a species of small tusk shell, a marine scaphopod mollusk in the family Gadilidae. This species is endemic to New Zealand.

It can be found from Northland to Fiordland, including the Chatham Rise and Chatham Islands. It lives at depths of between 35 and 600 metres (115 and 1,969 ft), and in the Milford Sound area between 180 and 200 metres (590 and 660 ft).
