= Costentalina elegans =

Scientific classification
- Kingdom: Animalia
- Phylum: Mollusca
- Class: Scaphopoda
- Order: Gadilida
- Family: Entalinidae
- Genus: Costentalina
- Species: C. elegans

Binomial name
- Costentalina elegans Chistikov, 1982

Species of mollusc

Costentalina elegans is a species of medium-sized tusk shell, a marine scaphopod mollusc in the family Entalinidae. It is found in Australia and the Indian Ocean. It is an abyssal species and lives at a depth of 5100 to 5800 m.
