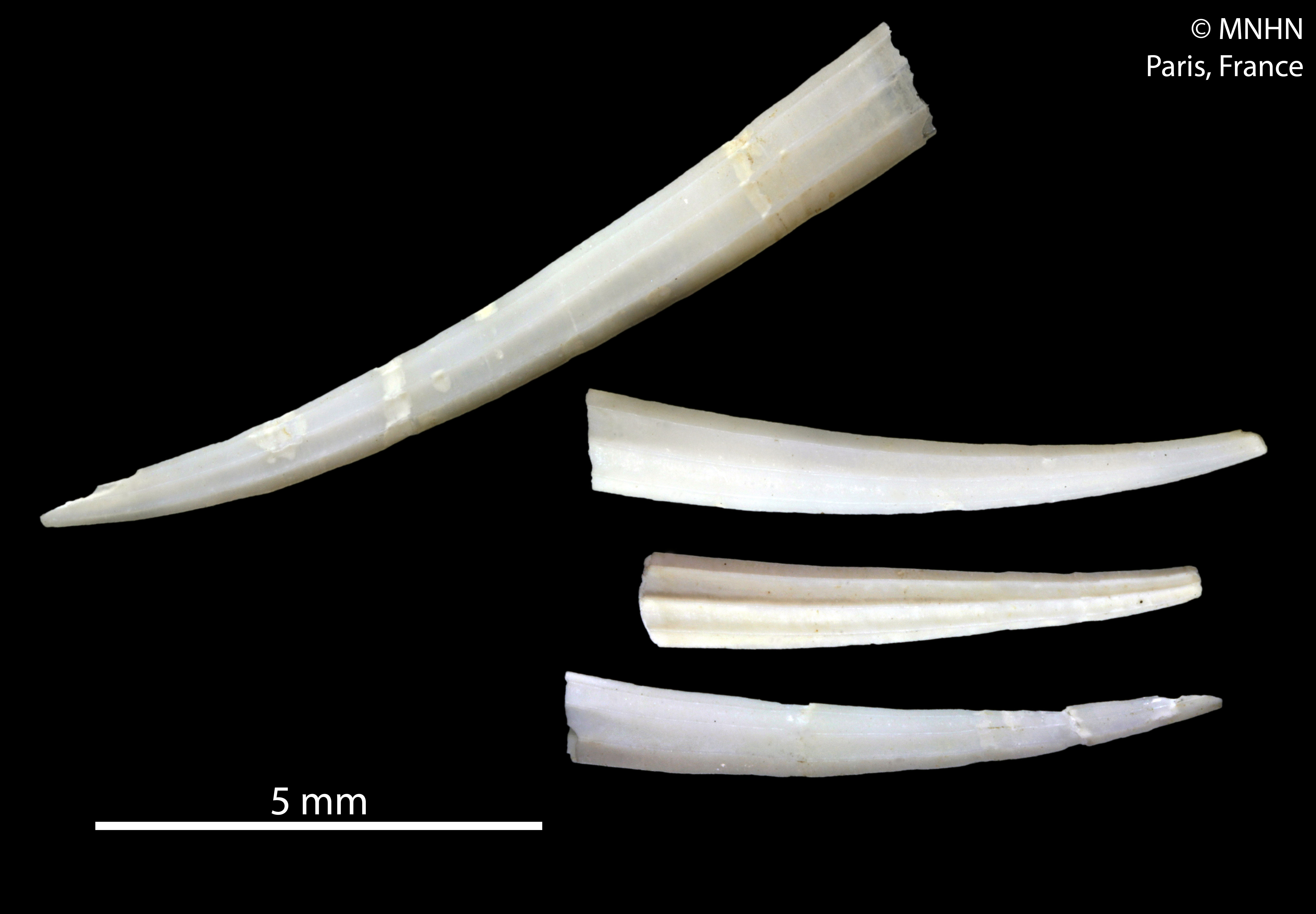
- Shell of Costentalina tuscarorae (specimen at MNHN, Paris)

Scientific classification
- Kingdom: Animalia
- Phylum: Mollusca
- Class: Scaphopoda
- Order: Gadilida
- Suborder: Entalimorpha
- Family: Entalinidae
- Subfamily: Heteroschismoidinae
- Genus: Costentalina; Chistikov, 1982

Type species
- Costentalina elegans Chistikov, 1982

= Costentalina =

Genus of molluscs

Costentalina is a genus of medium-sized tusk shells, marine scaphopod molluscs in the family Entalinidae.

== Species ==
- Costentalina caymanica Chistikov, 1982
- Costentalina elegans Chistikov, 1982
- Costentalina indica Chistikov, 1982
- Costentalina leptoconcha Chistikov, 1982
- Costentalina pacifica Chistikov, 1982
- Costentalina tuscarorae Chistikov, 1982
- Costentalina vemae Scarabino, 1986
