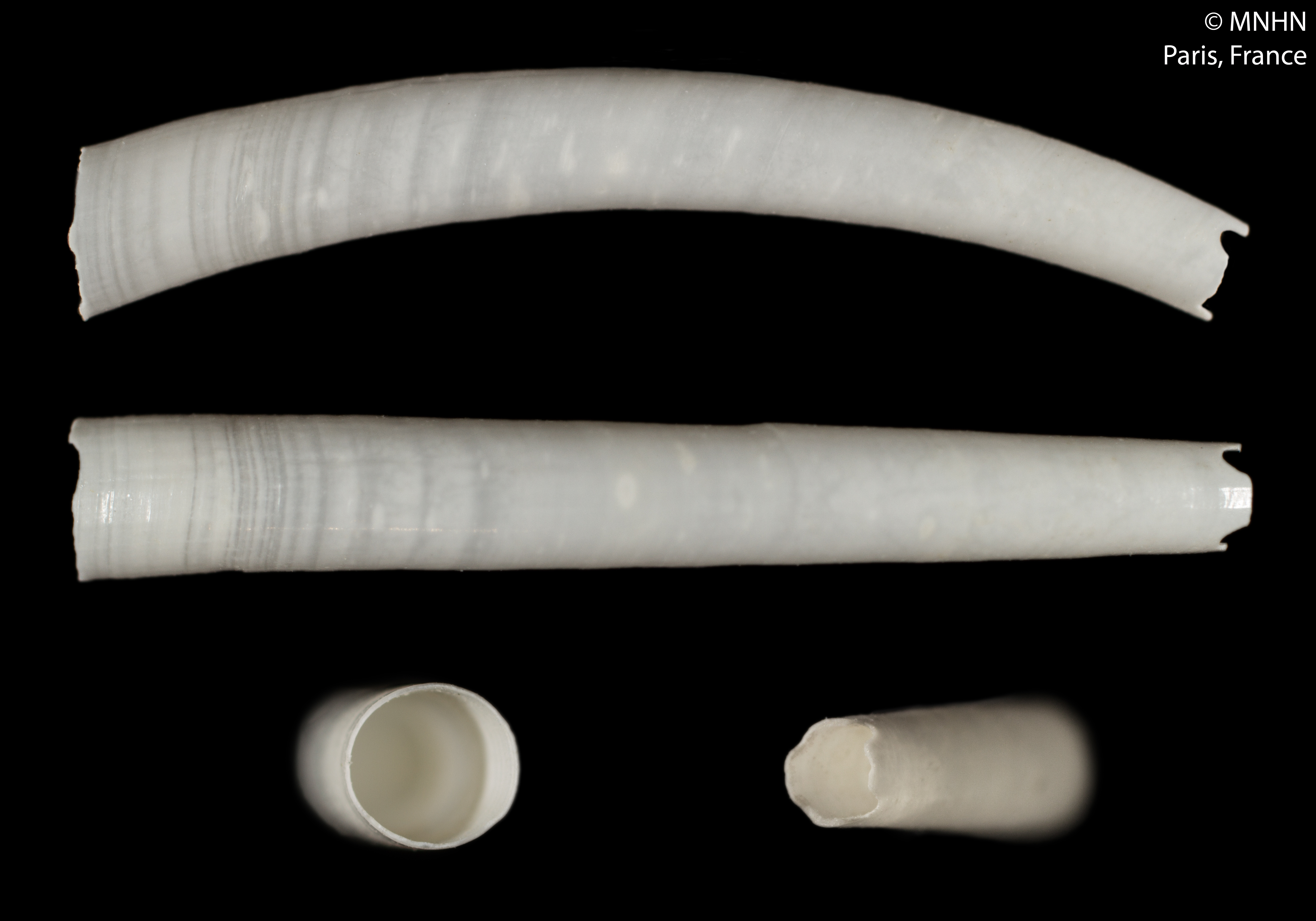
- Shell of Siphonodentalium laubieri (holotype at MNHN, Paris)

Scientific classification
- Kingdom: Animalia
- Phylum: Mollusca
- Class: Scaphopoda
- Order: Gadilida
- Family: Gadilidae
- Genus: Siphonodentalium; M. Sars, 1859

Species
- see text.

Synonyms
- Siphodentalium Monterosato, 1874 (unjustified emendation)

= Siphonodentalium =

Genus of molluscs

Siphonodentalium is a genus of small tusk shells in the family Gadilidae.

== Species ==
- Siphonodentalium australasiae Boissevain, 1906
- Siphonodentalium booceras (Tomlin, 1926)
- Siphonodentalium colubridens (R. B. Watson, 1879)
- Siphonodentalium coronatum V. Scarabino & F. Scarabino, 2011
- Siphonodentalium dalli (Pilsbry & Sharp, 1898)
- Siphonodentalium delicatulum (Suter, 1913)
- Siphonodentalium hexaschistum (Boissevain, 1906)
- Siphonodentalium isaotakii Habe, 1953
- Siphonodentalium jaeckeli Scarabino, 1995
- Siphonodentalium japonicum Habe, 1960
- Siphonodentalium laubieri Bouchet & Warén, 1979
- Siphonodentalium lobatum (G. B. Sowerby II, 1860)
- Siphonodentalium longilobatum (Boissevain, 1906)
- Siphonodentalium magnum (Boissevain, 1906)
- Siphonodentalium minutum Z.-Y. Qi, X.-T. Ma & J.-L. Zhang, 1998
- Siphonodentalium okudai Habe, 1953
- † Siphonodentalium parisiense (Deshayes, 1861)
- Siphonodentalium promontorii (Barnard, 1963)
- Siphonodentalium summa (Okutani, 1964)

Synonyms

- Siphonodentalium affine Sars M., 1865: synonym of Pulsellum affine (M. Sars, 1865)
- † Siphonodentalium bouryi Cossmann, 1888: synonym of † Dischides bouryi (Cossmann, 1888)( superseded combination)
- Siphonodentalium bushae (Henderson, 1920): synonym of Pulsellum bushae (J. B. Henderson, 1920) (original combination)
- Siphonodentalium dichelum R. B. Watson, 1879: synonym of Dischides dichelus (R. B. Watson, 1879) (original combination)
- Siphonodentalium eboracense R. B. Watson, 1879: synonym of Pulsellum eboracense (R. B. Watson, 1879) (original combination)
- Siphonodentalium galatheae Knudsen, 1964: synonym of Striopulsellum galatheae (Knudsen, 1964) (original combination)
- Siphonodentalium kikuchii Kuroda & Habe, 1952: synonym of Compressidens kikuchii (Kuroda & Habe, 1952) (original combination)
- Siphonodentalium lofotense M. Sars, 1865: synonym of Pulsellum lofotense (M. Sars, 1865) (original combination)
- † Siphonodentalium meyeri Cossmann, 1888: synonym of † Polyschides meyeri (Cossmann, 1888) (unaccepted > superseded combination)
- Siphonodentalium minimum Plate, 1909: synonym of Striopulsellum minimum (Plate, 1909) (original combination)
- Siphonodentalium occidentale Henderson, 1920: synonym of Pulsellum occidentale (Henderson, 1920)
- Siphonodentalium olivi: synonym of Polyschides olivi (Scacchi, 1835)
- Siphonodentalium pentagonum M. Sars, 1865: synonym of Entalina tetragona (Brocchi, 1814)
- Siphonodentalium platamodes R. B. Watson, 1879: synonym of Entalina platamodes (R. B. Watson, 1879) (original combination)
- Siphonodentalium prionotum R. B. Watson, 1879: synonym of Dischides prionotus (R. B. Watson, 1879) (original combination)
- Siphonodentalium quadridentatum Dall, 1881: synonym of Polyschides tetraschistus (R. B. Watson, 1879)
- Siphonodentalium quadrifissatum (Pilsbry & Sharp, 1898): synonym of Polyschides quadrifissatus (Pilsbry & Sharp, 1898)
- Siphonodentalium striatinum Henderson, 1920: synonym of Striopulsellum striatinum (Henderson, 1920)
- Siphonodentalium subfusiforme Sars M., 1865: synonym of Cadulus subfusiformis (M. Sars, 1865)
- Siphonodentalium teres Jeffreys, 1883: synonym of Pulsellum teres (Jeffreys, 1883)
- Siphonodentalium tetraschistum R. B. Watson, 1879: synonym of Polyschides tetraschistus (R. B. Watson, 1879) (original combination)
- Siphonodentalium verrilli Henderson, 1920: synonym of Pulsellum verrilli (Henderson, 1920)
