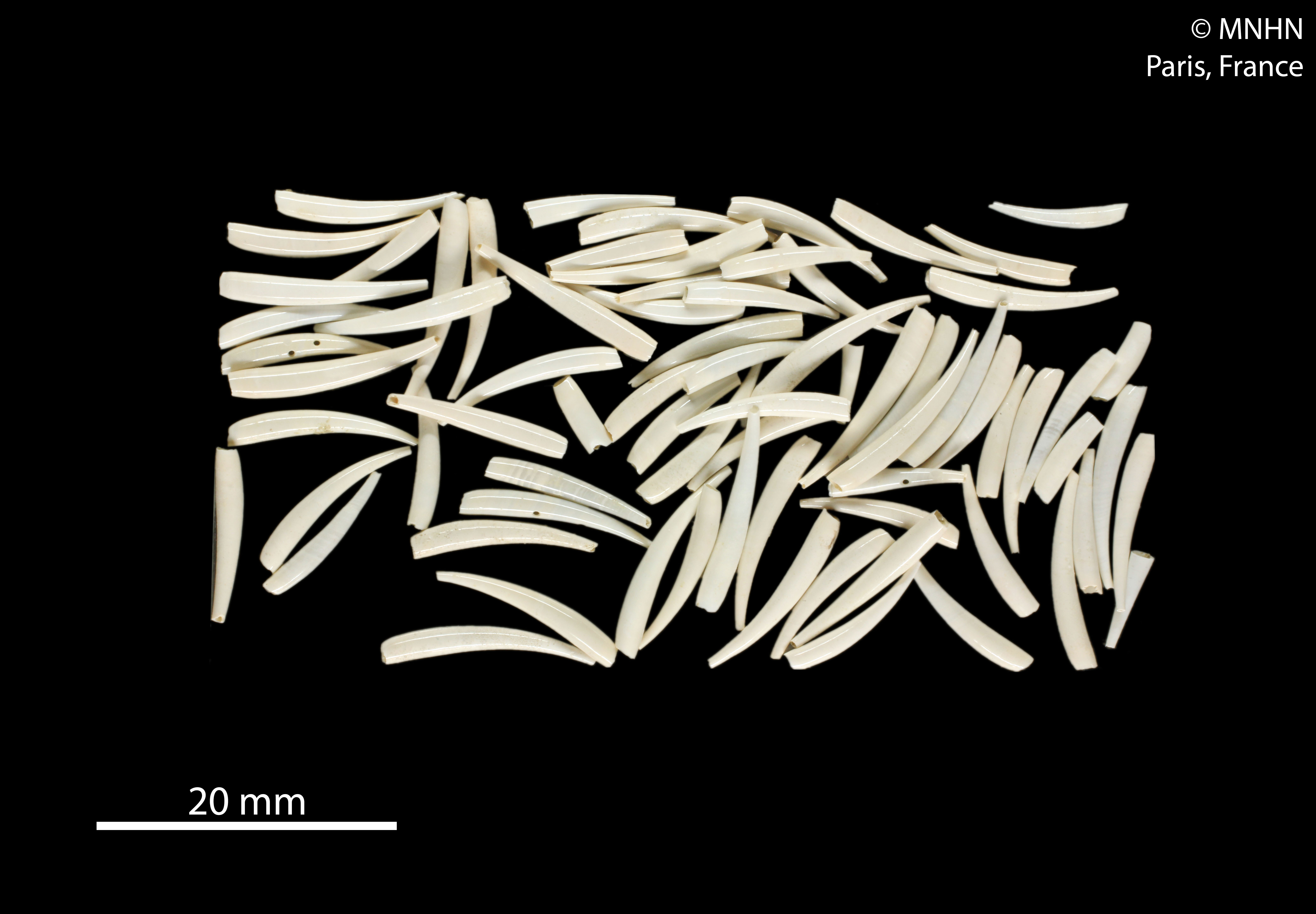
- Polyschides pelamidae (specimens at MNHN, Paris)

Scientific classification
- Kingdom: Animalia
- Phylum: Mollusca
- Class: Scaphopoda
- Order: Gadilida
- Suborder: Gadilimorpha
- Family: Gadilidae
- Genus: Polyschides; Pilsbry & Sharp, 1898

Synonyms
- Cadulus (Platyschides) Henderson, 1920; Cadulus (Polyschides) Pilsbry & Sharp, 1898 (original rank); Platyschides Henderson, 1920

= Polyschides =

Genus of molluscs

Polyschides is a genus of gadilid tusk shell (scaphopod).

== Species ==
- Polyschides andersoni Lamprell & Healy, 1998
- Polyschides arnaudi Scarabino, 1995
- Polyschides arnoensis Maxwell, 1992 †
- Polyschides carolinensis (Bush, 1885)
- Polyschides cayrei Scarabino, 2008
- Polyschides cuspidatus (Nicklès, 1979)
- Polyschides fausta Kuroda, Habe & Oyama, 1971
- Polyschides foweyensis (Henderson, 1920)
- Polyschides gibbosus (Verco, 1911)
- Polyschides grandis (Verrill, 1884)
- Polyschides kaiyomaruae Okutani, 1975
- Polyschides kapuaensis Maxwell, 1992 †
- Polyschides miamiensis (Henderson, 1920)
- Polyschides nedallisoni (Emerson, 1978)
- Polyschides nitidus (Henderson, 1920)
- Polyschides noronhensis Simone, 2009
- Polyschides olivi (Scacchi, 1835)
- Polyschides pelamidae Chistikov, 1979
- Polyschides portoricensis (Henderson, 1920)
- Polyschides quadrifissatus (Pilsbry & Sharp, 1898)
- Polyschides rushii (Pilsbry & Sharp, 1898)
- Polyschides sakuraii (Kuroda & Habe in Habe, 1961)
- Polyschides spectabilis (A. E. Verrill, 1885)
- Polyschides sutherlandi Lamprell & Healy, 1998
- Polyschides tetraschistus (Watson, 1879)
- Polyschides tetrodon (Pilsbry & Sharp, 1898)
- Polyschides vietnamicus Chistikov, 1979
- Polyschides wareni Scarabino, 2008
- Polyschides xavante Caetano & Absalão, 2005

Synonyms

- Polyschides agassizii (Dall, 1881): synonym of Gadila agassizii (Dall, 1881)
- Polyschides bushiae (Dall, 1889): synonym of Gadila bushii (Dall, 1889)
- Polyschides californicus (Pilsbry & Sharp, 1898): synonym of Cadulus californicus Pilsbry & Sharp, 1898
- Polyschides elongatus (Henderson, 1920): synonym of Gadila elongata (Henderson, 1920)
- Polyschides pandionis (Verrill & S. Smith [in Verrill], 1880): synonym of Gadila pandionis (A. E. Verrill & S. Smith, 1880)
- Polyschides pelamide [sic]: synonym of Polyschides pelamidae Chistikov, 1979 (misspelling)
- Polyschides poculum (Dall, 1889): synonym of Gadila pocula (Dall, 1889)
- Polyschides poculus (Dall, 1889): synonym of Gadila pocula (Dall, 1889) (new combination)
- Polyschides summa Okutani, 1964: synonym of Siphonodentalium summa (Okutani, 1964) (original combination)
- Polyschides tetraschistum (R. B. Watson, 1879): synonym of Polyschides tetraschistus (R. B. Watson, 1879)
- Polyschides tolmiei (Dall, 1897): synonym of Gadila tolmiei (Dall, 1897)
