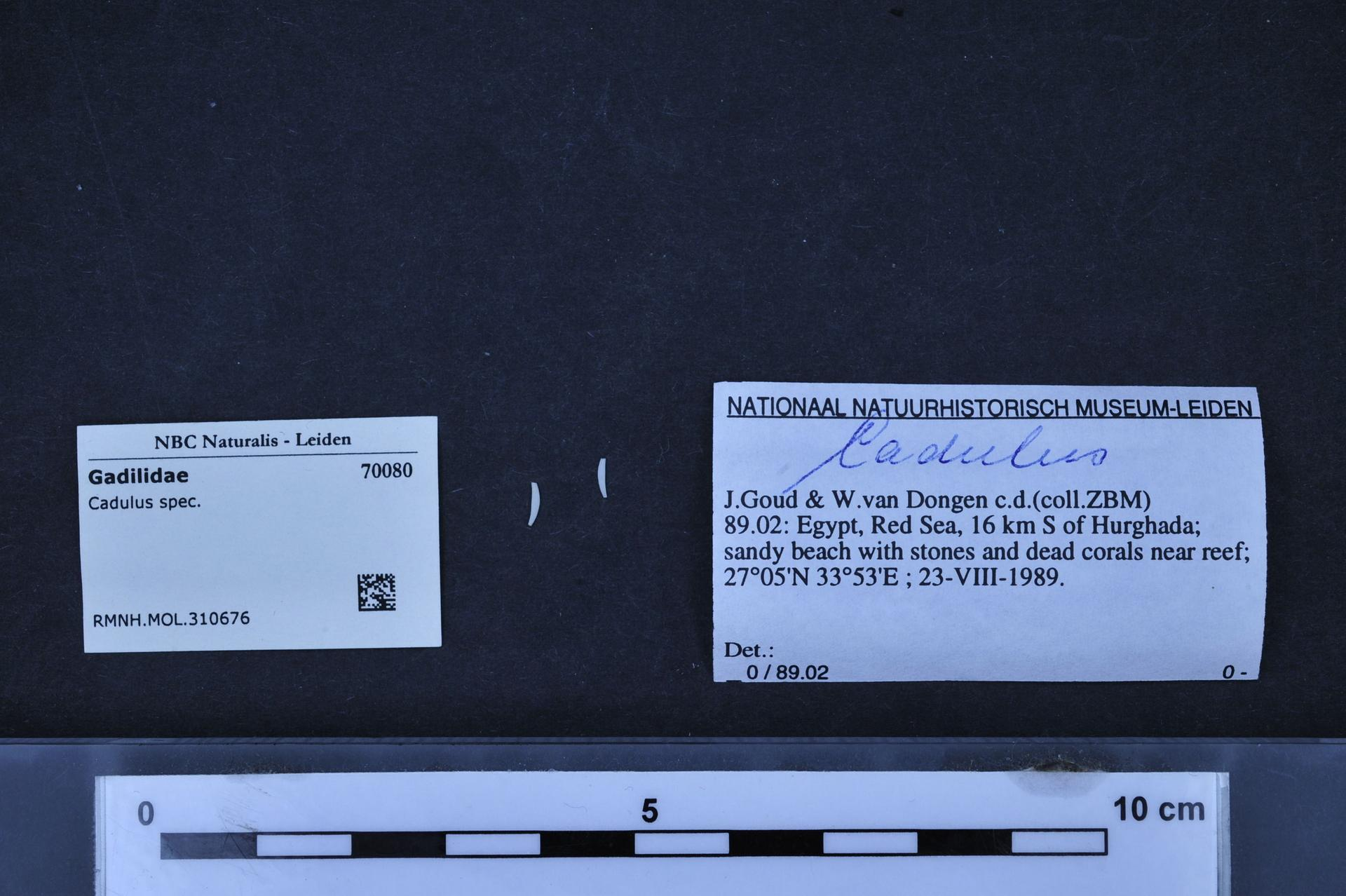
- Cadulus sp.

Scientific classification
- Kingdom: Animalia
- Phylum: Mollusca
- Class: Scaphopoda
- Order: Gadilida
- Family: Gadilidae
- Genus: Cadulus; Philippi, 1844

Species
- 52, see text.

= Cadulus =

Genus of molluscs

Cadulus is a large genus of small tusk shells in the family Gadilidae. It contains over fifty-one described species.

== Species ==
- Cadulus acus Dall, 1889
- Cadulus aequalis Dall, 1881
- Cadulus agassizii Dall, 1881
- Cadulus albicomatus Dall, 1890
- Cadulus amiantus Dall, 1889
- Cadulus amphora Jeffreys, 1883
- Cadulus ampullaceus Watson, 1879
- Cadulus aratus Hedley, 1899
- Cadulus arctus Henderson, 1920
- Cadulus artatus Locard, 1897
- Cadulus atlanticus Henderson, 1920
- Cadulus attenuatus Monterosato, 1875
- Cadulus austinclarki Emerson, 1951
- Cadulus californicus (Pilsbry and Sharp, 1898)
- Cadulus campylus Melvill, 1906
- Cadulus catharus Henderson, 1920
- Cadulus chuni Jaeckel, 1932
- Cadulus colliverae Lamprell & Healy, 1998
- Cadulus congruens Watson, 1879
- Cadulus cucurbitus Dall, 1881
- Cadulus curtus Watson, 1879
- Cadulus cyathoides Jaeckel, 1932
- Cadulus cylindratus Jeffereys, 1877
- Cadulus delicatulus Suter, 1913
- Cadulus deschampsi Scarabino, 2008
- Cadulus deverdensis Scarabino, 2008
- Cadulus eliezeri Caetano, Scarabino & Absalão, 2006
- Cadulus euloides Melvill & Standen, 1901
- Cadulus exiguus Watson, 1879
- Cadulus florenciae Scarabino, 1995
- Cadulus foweyensis Henderson, 1920
- Cadulus gibbus Jeffreys, 1883
- Cadulus glans Scarabino, 1995
- Cadulus gracilis Jeffreys, 1877
- Cadulus greenlawi Dall, 1889
- Cadulus iota Henderson, 1920
- Cadulus jeffreysi (Monterosato, 1875)
- Cadulus labeyriei Scarabino, 1995
- Cadulus lemniscoides Scarabino, 2008
- Cadulus loyaltyensis Scarabino, 2008
- Cadulus lunulus Dall, 1881
- Cadulus macleani Emerson, 1978
- Cadulus mayori (J. B. Henderson, 1920)
- Cadulus miamiensis J. B. Henderson, 1920
- Cadulus minusculus Dall, 1889
- Cadulus monterosatoi Locard, 1897
- Cadulus nerta Caetano, Scarabino & Absalão, 2006
- Cadulus obesus Watson, 1879
- Cadulus occiduus Verco, 1911
- Cadulus ovulum (Philippi, 1844)
- Cadulus parvus J. B. Henderson, 1920
- Cadulus platei Jaeckel, 1932
- Cadulus platensis Henderson, 1920
- Cadulus podagrinus Henderson, 1920
- Cadulus propinquus Sars G.O., 1878
- Cadulus providensis Henderson, 1920
- Cadulus quadridentatus Dall, 1881
- Cadulus quadrifissatus (Pilsbry and Sharp, 1898)
- Cadulus rastridens Watson, 1879
- Cadulus regularis Henderson, 1920
- Cadulus rocroii Scarabino, 2008
- Cadulus rossoi Nicklès, 1979
- Cadulus rudmani Lamprell & Healy, 1998
- Cadulus scarabinoi Steiner & Kabat, 2004
- † Cadulus scarabinorum Roco-Villablanca, Rivadeneira and Nielsen, 2026
- Cadulus siberutensis Jaeckel, 1932
- Cadulus simillimus Watson, 1879
- Cadulus sofiae Scarabino, 1995
- Cadulus stearnsii (Pilsbry and Sharp, 1898)
- Cadulus subfusiformis (M. Sars, 1865)
- Cadulus teliger Finlay, 1927
- Cadulus tersus Henderson, 1920
- Cadulus tetraschistus (Watson, 1879)
- Cadulus tetrodon Pilsbry and Sharp, 1898
- Cadulus thielei Plate, 1908
- Cadulus tolmiei (Dall, 1897)
- Cadulus transitorius (J. B. Henderson, 1920) - inflated toothshell
- Cadulus tumidosus Jeffreys, 1877
- Cadulus unilobatus V. Scarabino & F. Scarabino, 2011
- Cadulus valdiviae Jaeckel, 1932
- Cadulus vincentianus Cotton & Godfrey, 1940
- Cadulus watsoni Dall, 1881
- Cadulus woodhousae Lamprell & Healy, 1998

Species brought into synonymy

- Cadulus aberrans Whiteaves, 1887 - aberrant toothshell: synonym of Gadila aberrans (Whiteaves, 1887)
- Cadulus booceras Tomlin, 1926: synonym of Siphonodentalium booceras (Tomlin, 1926)
- Cadulus carolinensis Bush, 1885: synonym of Polyschides carolinensis (Bush, 1885)
- Cadulus domingensis (d'Orbigny in Mörch, 1863): synonym of Gadila dominguensis (d'Orbigny, 1853)
- Cadulus carolinensis Bush, 1885: synonym of Polyschides carolinensis (Bush, 1885)
- Cadulus colubridens Watson, 1879: synonym of Siphonodentalium colubridens (R. B. Watson, 1879)
- Cadulus elongatus J. B. Henderson, 1920: synonym of Gadila elongata (Henderson, 1920)
- Cadulus fusiformis Pilsbry and Sharp, 1898: synonym of Gadila aberrans (Whiteaves, 1887)
- Cadulus grandis A. E. Verrill, 1884: synonym of Polyschides grandis (Verrill, 1884)
- Cadulus halius Henderson, 1920: synonym of Cadulus podagrinus Henderson, 1920
- Cadulus hepburni (Dall, 1897): synonym of Gadila aberrans (Whiteaves, 1887)
- Cadulus laevis (Brazier, 1877): synonym of Ditrupa gracillima Grube, 1878
- Cadulus martini Scarabino, 1995: synonym of Cadulus scarabinoi Steiner & Kabat, 2004
- Cadulus nitentior Arnold, 1903 †: synonym of Gadila aberrans (Whiteaves, 1887)
- Cadulus nitidus: synonym of Polyschides nitidus (Henderson, 1920)
- Cadulus pandionis (A. E. Verrill and S. Smith, 1880): synonym of Gadila pandionis (Verrill & Smith, 1880)
- Cadulus perpusillus (Sowerby, 1832): synonym of Gadila perpusilla (Sowerby in Broderip & Sowerby, 1832)
- Cadulus peruvianus Dall, 1908: synonym of Gadila peruviana (Dall, 1908)
- Cadulus poculum Dall, 1889: synonym of Gadila pocula (Dall, 1889)
- Cadulus rushii Pilsbry and Sharp, 1898: synonym of Polyschides rushii (Pilsbry & Sharp, 1898)
- Cadulus simpsoni Henderson, 1920: synonym of Gadila simpsoni Henderson, 1920
- Cadulus spectabilis A. E. Verrill, 1885: synonym of Polyschides spectabilis (A. E. Verrill, 1885)
- Cadulus strangulatus Locard, 1897: synonym of Gadila strangulata (Locard, 1897)
- Cadulus striatus Pilsbry and Sharp, 1898: synonym of Gadila striata (Pilsbry & Sharp, 1898)
- Cadulus subtilis Plate, 1908: synonym of Ditrupa gracillima Grube, 1878
- Cadulus verrilli Henderson, 1920: synonym of Gadila verrilli (Henderson, 1920)
- Cadulus viperidens Melvill & Standen, 1896: synonym of Dischides viperidens (Melvill & Standen, 1896)
