= Bathycadulus =

Scientific classification
- Kingdom: Animalia
- Phylum: Mollusca
- Class: Scaphopoda
- Order: Gadilida
- Family: Gadilidae
- Genus: Bathycadulus; Scarabino, 1995

Genus of molluscs

Bathycadulus is a genus of molluscs belonging to the family Gadilidae.

The species of this genus are found in Europe, Southern Africa and Australia.

Species:

- Bathycadulus fabrizioi Scarabino, 1995
- Bathycadulus hendersoni Scarabino, Caetano & Carranza, 2011
- Bathycadulus queirosi Scarabino, Caetano & Carranza, 2011
- Bathycadulus segonzaci Scarabino, Caetano & Carranza, 2011
