= Wemersoniellidae =

Scientific classification
- Kingdom: Animalia
- Phylum: Mollusca
- Class: Scaphopoda
- Order: Gadilida
- Family: Wemersoniellidae; Scarabino, 1986

Family of molluscs

Wemersoniellidae is a family of molluscs belonging to the order Gadilida, which contains small tusk shells.

This family has six species known to be extant, which are in two genera that the family encompasses.

== Description ==
Wemersoniellidae have been described as having amounts of frontal epithelium papillae and of subepithelial gland cells that are numerous compared to other mollusk families.

Compared to the mollusk families Dentaliida and Entalinidae, Wemersoniellidae have an additional set of muscles that control retraction of their pedal. In Wemersoniellidae, and all members of the family Gadilida, the elongation movement of the foot is completely hydraulic and has no muscle-based component, as it does in the family Dentaliida. Correspondingly, the other muscles controlling the pedals in Wemersoniellidae are reduced.

Genera:

- Chistikovia Scarabino, 1995
- Wemersoniella Scarabino, 1986
