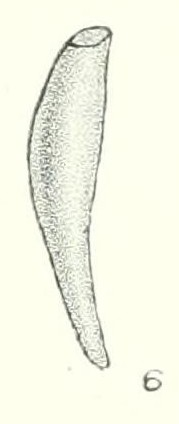
- illustration of Siphonodentalium colubridens, 15 × 2.5 mm.

Scientific classification
- Kingdom: Animalia
- Phylum: Mollusca
- Class: Scaphopoda
- Order: Gadilida
- Family: Gadilidae
- Genus: Siphonodentalium
- Species: S. colubridens

Binomial name
- Siphonodentalium colubridens Watson, 1879

Synonyms
- Cadulus colubridens R. B. Watson, 1879

= Siphonodentalium colubridens =

Species of mollusc

Siphonodentalium colubridens is a tusk shell or scaphopod in the family Gadilidae of the order Dentaliida.

This species was described from only one specimen collected in 1874 by the H.M.S. Challenger expedition. The original description and a drawing was published in 1879 by Robert Boog Watson, a Scottish malacologist who reported on the Scaphopoda and Gastropoda of the Challenger expedition. The specimen was collected at a depth of about 1300 m in ocean waters east of North Island, New Zealand.

The species is described as having a smooth, white shell, with a swelling below the anterior aperture and a length of 15 mm.
