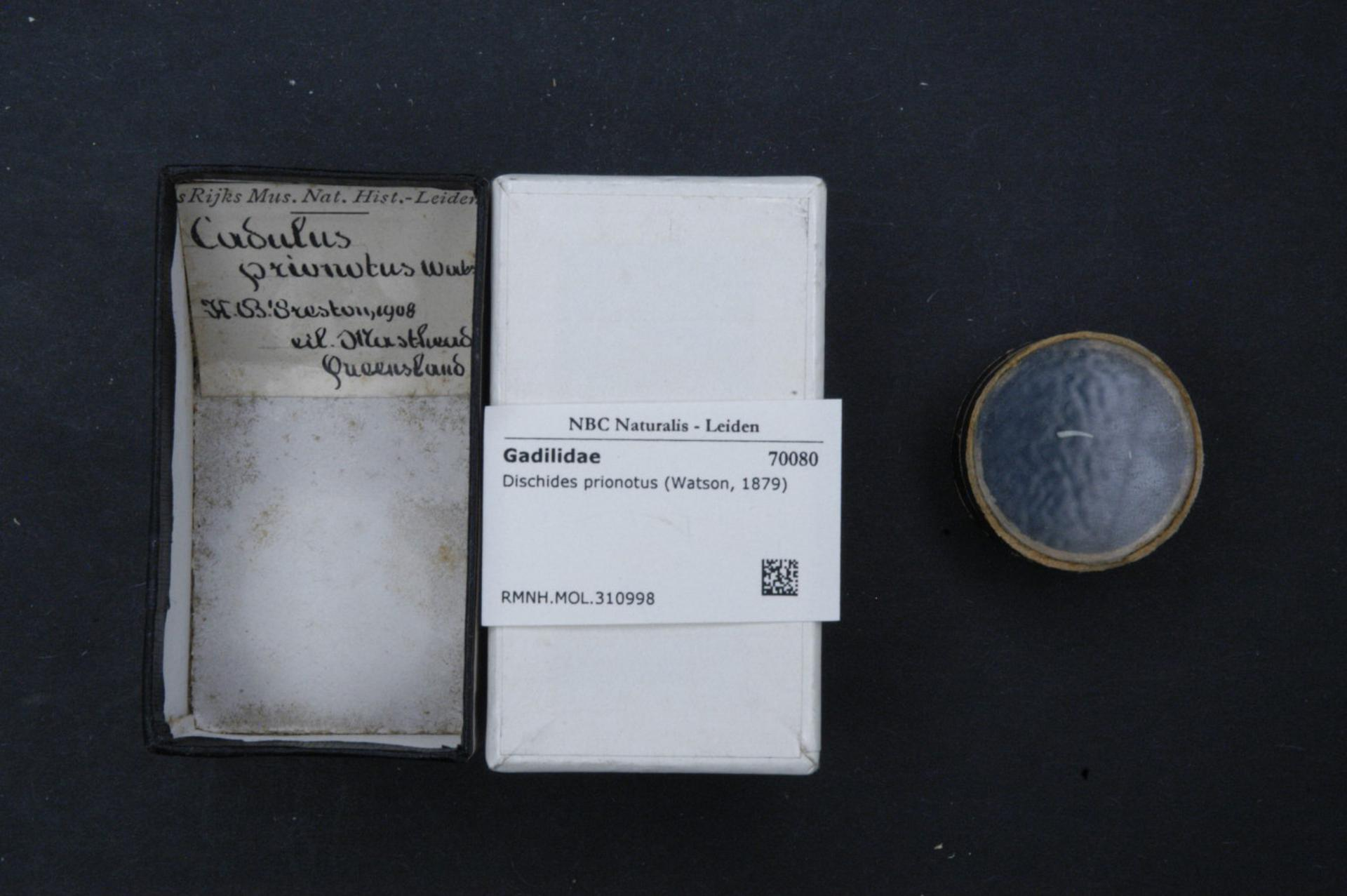
- Dischides prionotus (Watson, 1879)

Scientific classification
- Kingdom: Animalia
- Phylum: Mollusca
- Class: Scaphopoda
- Order: Gadilida
- Family: Gadilidae
- Genus: Dischides; Jeffreys, 1867

= Dischides =

Genus of molluscs

Dischides is a genus of molluscs belonging to the family Gadilidae.

The species of this genus are found in Eurasia, Northern Africa and Australia.

== Species ==
Species:

- Dischides atlantideus (Nicklès, 1955)
- Dischides belcheri Pilsbry & Sharp, 1898
- Dischides belenae Scarabino, 2008
- Dischides celeciai Scarabino, 2008
- Dischides dartevellei (Nicklès, 1979)
- Dischides dichelus (R.B.Watson, 1879)
- Dischides hintoni Lamprell & Healy, 1998
- Dischides leloeuffi (Nicklès, 1979)
- Dischides minutus (H.Adams, 1872)
- Dischides montrouzieri Scarabino, 2008
- Dischides ovalis (Boissevain, 1906)
- Dischides politus (S.Wood, 1842)
- Dischides prionotus (R.B.Watson, 1879)
- Dischides splendens Raines, 2002
- Dischides viperidens (Melvill & Standen, 1896)
- Dischides yateensis Scarabino, 1955
