= Gadila (mollusc) =

Scientific classification
- Kingdom: Animalia
- Phylum: Mollusca
- Class: Scaphopoda
- Order: Gadilida
- Family: Gadilidae
- Genus: Gadila; J.E.Gray, 1847

Type species
- Gadila gadus Montague

Species
- see text.

Synonyms
- Cadulus

Genus of molluscs

Gadila is a genus of small tusk shells, which are marine scaphopod molluscs in the family Gadilidae.

== Description ==
Shell decidedly curved; more or less swollen near the middle or toward the aperture; more tapering toward the apex; apical orifice not contracted by a callous ring; or with such callous ring, weak and far within. Edges not slit.

— Pilsbry and Sharp, original genus description

== Species ==
Species within the genus Gadila include:

- Gadila brasiliensis
- Gadila dominguensis
- Gadila elongatus Henderson, 1920
- Gadila fusiformis Pilsbry and Sharp, 1898, the fusiform toothshell
- Gadila gadus Montague, 1803
- Gadila hepburni Dall, 1897, the Hepburn toothshell
- Gadila mayori Henderson, 1920, the Mayor toothshell
- Gadila olivii Scacchi, 1835
- Gadila pandionis
- Gadila simpsoni
- Gadila subfusiformes M. Sars, 1850
