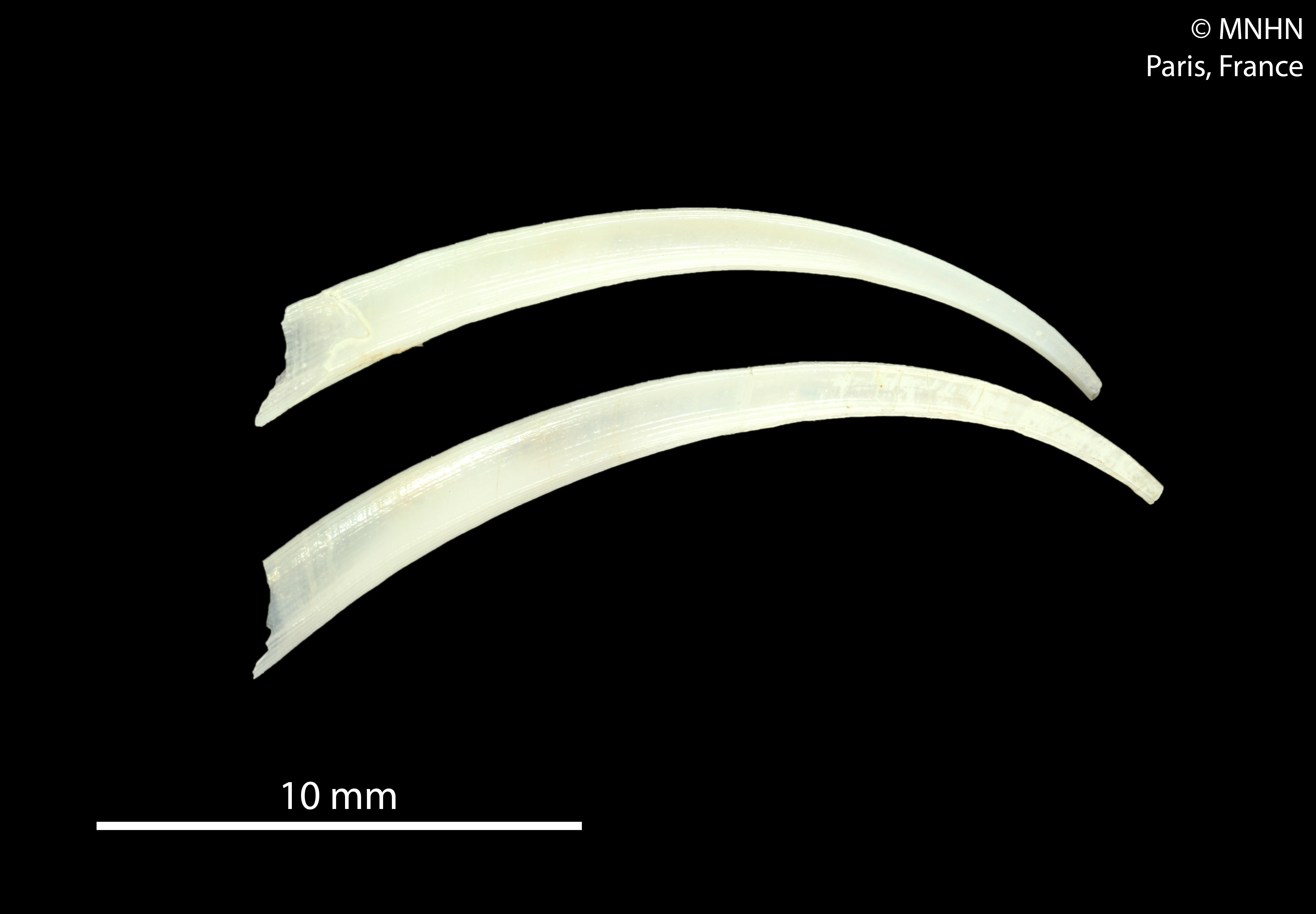
- Shell of Entalina mirifica (specimen at MNHN, Paris)

Scientific classification
- Kingdom: Animalia
- Phylum: Mollusca
- Class: Scaphopoda
- Order: Gadilida
- Suborder: Entalimorpha
- Family: Entalinidae; Chistikov, 1979

Subfamilies
- Bathoxiphinae; Entalininae; Heteroschismoidinae

= Entalinidae =

Family of molluscs

Entalinidae is a family of tusk shells, marine scaphopod mollusks in the order Gadilida.

== Genera ==
- Bathoxiphus Pilsbry & Sharp, 1897
- Costentalina Chistikov, 1982
- Entalina Monterosato, 1872
- Entalinopsis Habe, 1957
- Heteroschismoides Ludbrook, 1960
- Pertusiconcha Chistikov, 1982
- Rhomboxiphus Chistikov, 1983
- Solenoxiphus Chistikov, 1983
- Spadentalina Habe, 1963
