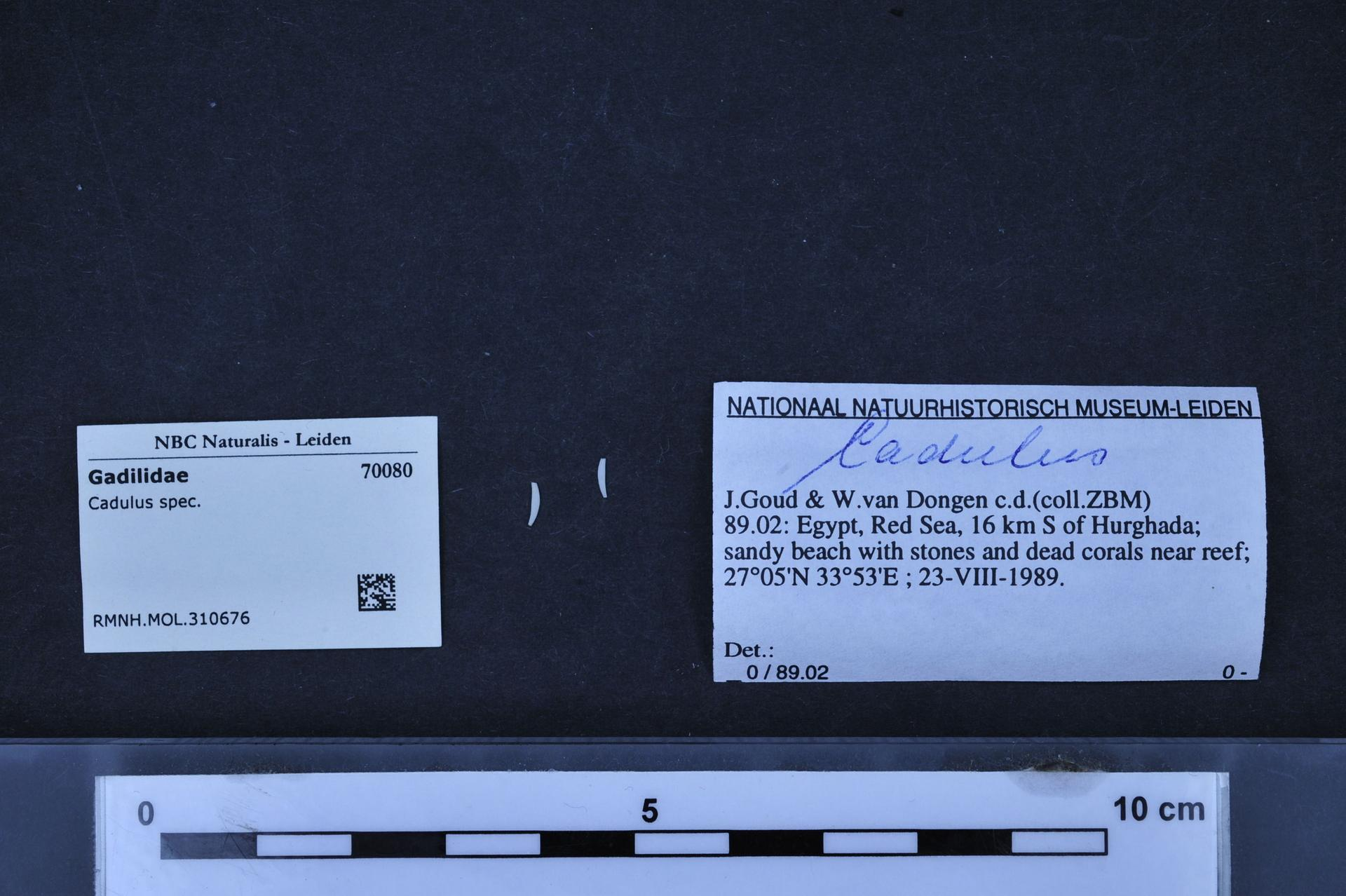
- Cadulus sp.

Scientific classification
- Kingdom: Animalia
- Phylum: Mollusca
- Class: Scaphopoda
- Order: Gadilida
- Suborder: Gadilimorpha
- Family: Gadilidae; Stoliczka, 1868

Genera
- See text

Synonyms
- Siphonodentaliidae Tryon, 1884

= Gadilidae =

Family of molluscs

Gadilidae is a family of tusk shells in the order Gadilida.

== Genera ==
- Bathycadulus Scarabino, 1995
- Cadulus Philippi, 1844
- Dischides Jeffreys, 1867
- Gadila Gray, 1847
- Polyschides Pilsbry & Sharp, 1898
- Sagamicadulus Sakurai & Shimazu, 1963
- Siphonodentalium M. Sars, 1859
- Striocadulus Emerson, 1962
