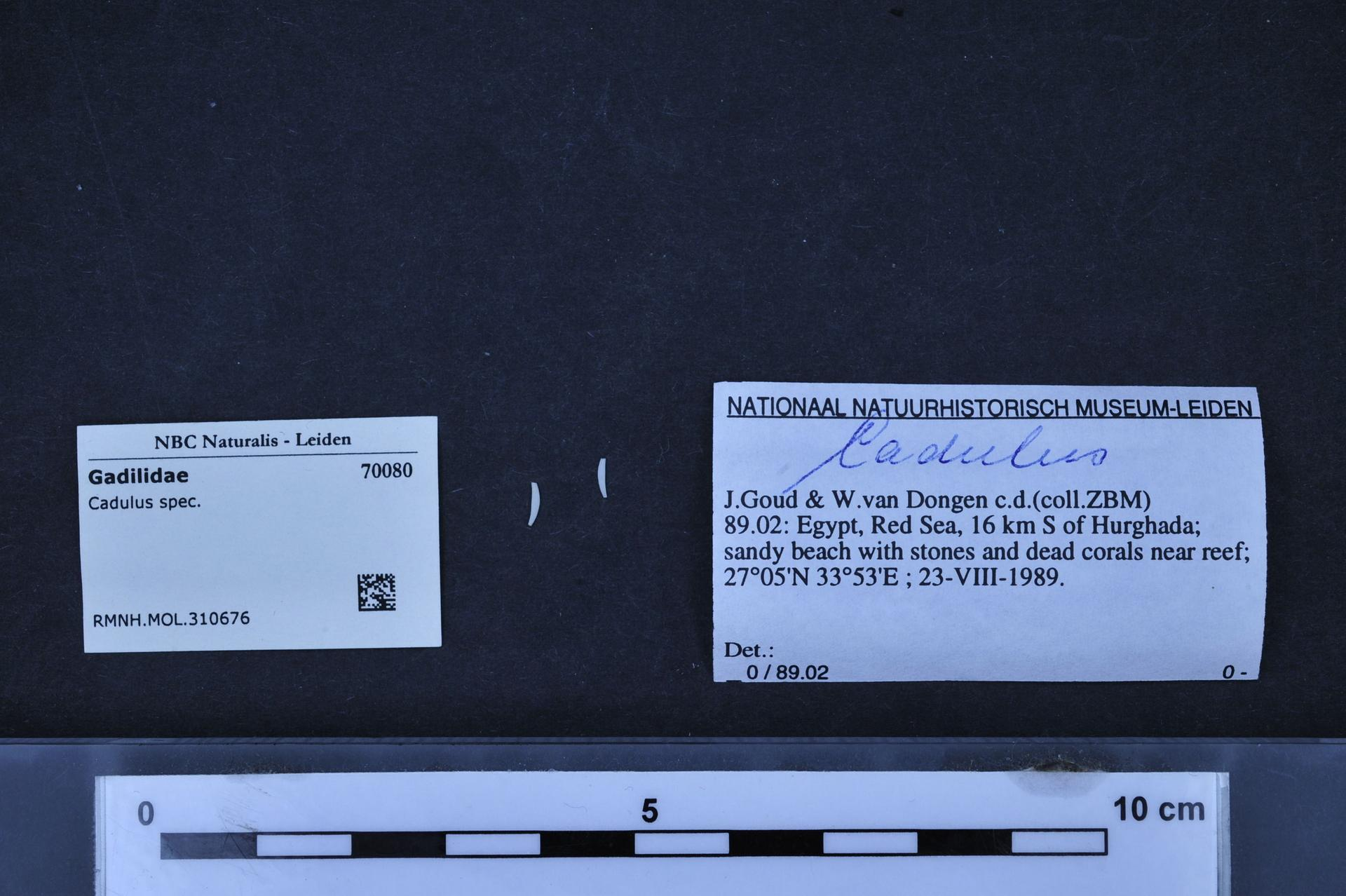
- Cadulus sp.

Scientific classification
- Kingdom: Animalia
- Phylum: Mollusca
- Class: Scaphopoda
- Order: Gadilida; Starobogatov, 1974

Families
- See text

= Gadilida =

Order of molluscs

Gadilida is an order of very small tusk shells, marine scaphopod molluscs.

The species within the Gadilida are usually very much smaller than those within the other order of scaphopods, the Dentaliida.

== Families ==
Families within the order Gadilida:

- Entalinidae Chistikov, 1979
- Gadilidae Stoliczka, 1868
- Pulsellidae Scarabino in Boss, 1982
- Wemersoniellidae Scarabino, 1986
- Unassigned:
  - Boissevainia V. Scarabino & F. Scarabino, 2010
  - Compressidens Pilsbry & Sharp, 1897
  - Megaentalina Habe, 1963
